= Queens directories =

Directories of the Borough of Queens, New York City

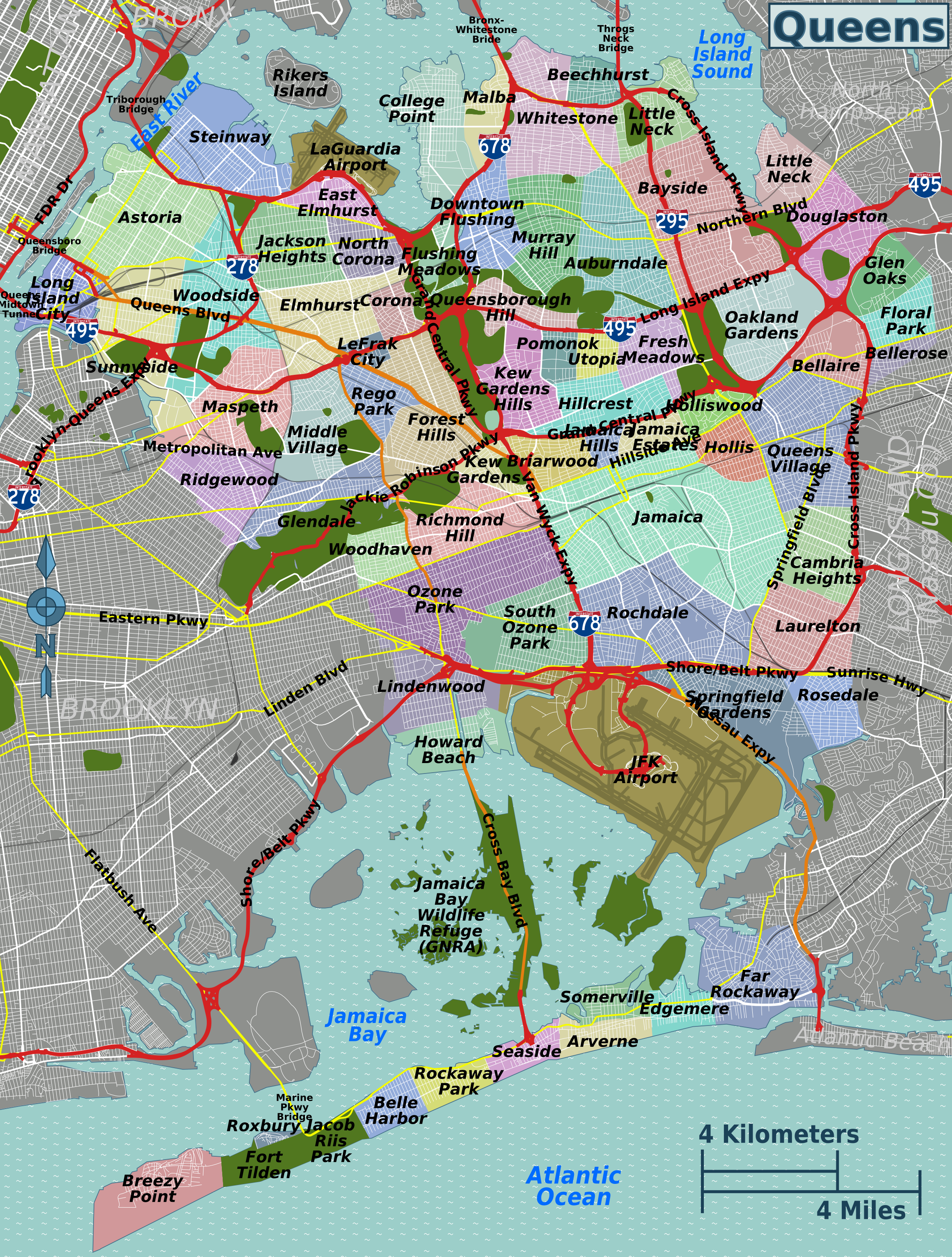
Map of Queens

Queens Directories – of New York City – were, before 1898, an assortment of village directories, Queens County directories, Long Island Directories, and add-ins or partial inclusions to New York City directories. In 1898, 30% of the western part of the old Queens County was absorbed into New York City. Before 1898, Nassau County covered the eastern 70% of the old Queens County. The older, larger Queens County was mostly agricultural, and within it were several towns, villages, and hamlets. In the mid- to late-19th century, cemeteries constituted one of the larger industries in Queens, Kings (Brooklyn), and Westchester (north of The Bronx) Counties. As of 1898, Queens County, New York, and the Borough of Queens, New York City, geographically, have been the same. Both Queens and Brooklyn are on Long Island. (this article includes selected bibliography and selected timelines that help identify people of Queens throughout its history)

== Timeline and highlights ==
=== Pre-consolidation (before 1898) towns, villages, and communities ===
Pre-consolidation (before 1898) towns, villages, and communities
Year	Topic	Notes
	Long Island	A Native American name for Long Island is Paumanok, meaning "The Island that Pays Tribute". Long Island was known as "Nassau Island" during the Colonial Dutch era, and later, the "Island of Stirling" after the Earl of Stirling (c. 1567–1640) acquired it, with other lands in North America exceeding ten million acres in 1621 and 1625 from Charles I. However, The Duke of York (who became James II), bought back the land for seven thousand pounds, but failed to pay the debt to Charles I. Ownership, namely for Long Island, reverted to the Earl of Stirling, although, the Plymouth Colony claimed it. King Charles, on April 22, 1636, instructed the Plymouth Colony to give Long Island to the Earl of Stirling. On April 20, 1637, the Earl of Stirling gave James Farret power of attorney to sell his land on Long Island. In 1641, James Farret, on behalf of the Stirling Estate, sold most of the eastern portion to the New Haven and Connecticut Colonies. (see Robins Island) Farret was allowed to choose 12,000 acres (49 km2) for his personal use. He chose Shelter Island. Grantees on behalf of the New Haven and Connecticut Colonies: Saybrook Colony: 1. George Fenwick (1603–1657) of Seabrook Port, Esquire; Connecticut Colony: 2. John Haynes (1594–1653); 3. Samuel Wyllys ‡; 4. Edward Hopkins (1600–1657) of Hartford; New Haven Colony: 5. Theophilus Eaton (1591–1658); 6. Stephen Goodyeare (1598–1658); 7. Thomas Gregson (1611–1647); –––––––––––––––––––– ‡ "Samuel Wyllys" might be a transcription error. George Wyllys (1590–1645), who had a son named Samuel Wyllys (1632–1709), was a founder of the Connecticut Colony.
1645:	Flushing	The original Flushing patent was signed October 10, 1645. The grantees of the original 1645 Flushing patent conveyed by Willem Kieft were: 1. Thomas Farrington (c. 1614 – c. 1646); 2. John Townsend (1608–1668), 3. Thomas Applegate (c. 1604 – c. 1662); 4. Thomas Beddard; 5. Lawrence Dutch (Laurens Duyts; c. 1612 – c. 1667–68); 6. John Lawrence (1618–1699); 7. William Lawrence (1622–1680); 8. William Thorne (1606–1670); 9. Henry Sautell; 10. William Pigeon; 11. Michael Milliard; 12. Robert Firman; 13. John Hicks (c. 1614–1672); 14. Edward Hart; 15. Thomas Stiles; 16. Thomas Saull; 17. John Marston; 18. Robert Field (1605–1672)
1652:	Elmhurst	Elmhurst, Queens, chartered in 1652 as Middelburgh (aka Middelburg) by settlers, English Puritans, from nearby Maspat (today's Maspeth). The name changed to Hastings when the British took over New Netherland in 1664, then New Towne (Newtown) in 1665. In 1896, two years before Queens County was incorporated into the Greater City of New York, the town was renamed Elmhurst. The namechange was influenced by Cord J. Meyer (1854–1910), who owned and developed real estate in the village.
1683:	Province of New York	On November 1, 1683, the British colony of New York – aka Province of New York – was organized as twelve counties. Queens, one of the twelve, included current Nassau County.
1683:	New York City wards	New York City was divided into wards between 1683 and 1938. These were used for the election of various municipal offices, and would later be used to define the boundaries of larger electoral districts. Prior to the formation of the so-called City of Greater New York in 1898, what is now New York City comprised multiple municipalities that had different histories with wards. (see Wards of New York City)
1785	New-York Manumission Society	The New-York Manumission Society, an abolitionist advocacy group, was founded in 1785. New York State, on February 22, 1788, passed "An Act Concerning Slaves," that authorized a slave owner to free any slave in a procedure called "manumit." The procedure required the owner to procure from the Overseers of the Poor a certificate certifying that the slave is under the age of fifty years, and of sufficient ability to provide for themself, and the certificate shall be registered in the Clerks office of the town.
1799	Gradual Emancipation Act of New York	New York, in 1799, passed a Gradual Emancipation Act, a law that freed no living slave; but after the date of passage, children born to slave mothers were required to work for the mother's master as indentured servants until age 28 (men) and 25 (women). The last slaves were freed of this obligation on July 4, 1827 – 28 years after 1799. African Americans celebrated with a parade. (see History of slavery in New York & § Slavery in New York).
1836:	College Point	In 1836, about 33 years before being incorporated as College Point, Rev. William Augustus Muhlenberg (1796–1877), an Episcopal Priest, began working to establish St. Paul's College and Grammar School to train priests. The college opened in 1839 and closed in 1847. Before 1836, William Lawrence (1622–1680), a slave owner, had owned nearly 900 acres – all of Tew's Neck – as grantee of a patent from the Dutch in 1645. Tew's Neck had been named for Michael Tew, the first settler. Eliphalet Stratton (1745–1831), in 1789, purchased 320 acres from the descendants of William Lawrence and established the village of Strattonport. In 1851, one of Stratton's daughters, as trustee, sold 141 acres – south of 15th Avenue – to real estate developers John A. Flammer (related to John G. Flammer; né Johann Gottlieb Flammer; 1807–1886) and Peter W. Longley, who established Flammersburg. Stratton's daughter retained the balance of one hundred and eighty acres for the Stratton family. Flammer and Longley subdivided the property into 80 building lots. By 1856, the three subdivisions – Strattonport, Flammersburg, and College Point – were commonly referred to as College Point. College Point was incorporated in 1867 or 1870. At the time, because many residents had immigrated from Germany, College Point was sometimes referred to as the "Little Heidelberg". Flammer was one of the original directors of the Third Avenue Railway and, in 1869, one of the original incorporators of The West Side Bank at 464 Eighth Avenue in Manhattan.
1837:	Panic of 1837	
1837:	Village of Flushing	Village of Flushing was incorporated on April 15, 1837.
1861–1865:	Civil War	No major battle occurred on Long Island during the Civil War. But, the State of New York lost suffered an estimated 39,000 deaths, more than any other state, Union of Confederate. William Andrew Boyd (1850–1918) published a directory in 1864 that included Astoria, Flushing, Jamaica, and Newtown. (see § Boyd's directory, below)
1865:	Blissville	Blissville was named for Neziah Bliss (1790–1876), who, with Eliphalet Nott (1773–1866), in 1837, purchased what then was the Hunter farm, which included Hunters Point. Blissville also included Francis Duryea's farm. One of Neziah Bliss' sons, Archibald Meserole Bliss (1836–1923), became a U.S. Congressman.
1870:	Long Island City	Captain Levy Hayden, superintendent of a marine railway formerly at Hunters Point, predicted, as early as 1853, that the area around Hunters Point would become a city. He even proposed that it be named "Long Island City." Thomas H. Todd (1835–1901), who, on October 20, 1865, published the first issue a newspaper bearing the name The Long Island City Star. Long Island City, on May 4, 1870, incorporated as a city from the merger of the Village of Astoria and the hamlets of Ravenswood, Hunters Point, Blissville, Sunnyside, Dutch Kills, Steinway, Bowery Bay, and Middleton – all separating from the Town of Newtown. At the time of its incorporation, Long Island City had between 12,000 and 15,000 residents. When it consolidated with New York City in 1898, it was 27 years, 7 months, and 28 days old.
1882:	Ozone Park	As in "fresh air," not "ozone layer." Benjamin W. Hitchcock and Charles C. Denton, who bought farmland and created building lots after a railroad opened in 1880 from Long Island City to Howard Beach. They decided to call their development Ozone Park to promote the idea of cool, clean breezes blowing in from the Atlantic Ocean. Fresh air is one of the meanings of ozone
1886:	Bowery Bay Beach	Bowery Bay Beach, later named North Beach, opened in 1886 on the shores of Bowery and Flushing Bays. It was known as the "Coney Island of Queens."
1889:	Murray Hill	Murray Hill in Queens, geologically, has no hill. Albeit, its namesake is from William King Murray (1839–1918), a Flushing horticulturist and nurseryman who, with Robert Bowne Parsons (1821–1898) (also a horticulturalist and nurseryman), sold property in the late 1880s to a real estate development firm headed by Frederick William Dunton (1851–1931). Dunton, by way of his mother, Lois Dunton (née Corbin; 1819–1893), was a nephew of Austin Corbin (1827–1996), President of the LIRR from 1881 until his death. On November 2, 1898, Robert Bowne Parsons was struck and killed instantly by a westbound LIRR train at Newtown while attempting to cross the track to catch a departing eastbound train home to Flushing. The original Murray Hill neighborhood in Manhattan is the namesake of Robert Murray (1721–1786), a New York City merchant and shipping tycoon and wife, Mary Lindley (maiden; 1726–1782). William King Murray, by way of his mother, Mary Ann King Murray (née Mary Ann King; 1790–1872), was a nephew of Joseph Harris King (1811–1887), who was married to Anna Lawrence Bloodgood (1810–1843), daughter of James Bloodgood (1781–1826),("Inscriptions" → St. George's Episcopal Church Yard, Vol. 4. 1912. p. 85. → § Families and genealogy) a widely-known horticulturist and nurseryman from Flushing.
1890:	Trow Settlement	John Libby was, in 1890, one of the four buyers of the block between 28th and 29th Streets and 14th and 15th Avenues in Beechhurst. This block was originally settled by employees of the Trow City Directory Company (see Jonathan Leavitt and John Fowler Trow) and was called for many years the "Trow Settlement." The house which was originally the Libby home, on the corner of 14th Avenue and 28thy Street, was later owned by Mrs. Charlotte Phayre.
1893:	Panic of 1893	
1897:	Consolidation authorized	The New York City borough of Queens was authorized May 4, 1897, by a vote of the New York State Legislature after an 1894 referendum on consolidation. The eastern 280 square miles (730 km^{2}) of Queens that became Nassau County was partitioned January 1, 1899. Queens Borough was established on January 1, 1898.
1898:	Consolidation occurred	On January 1, 1898, New York City absorbed East Bronx, Brooklyn, western Queens County, and Staten Island. From western Queens, all of Flushing, Jamaica, Long Island City, and Newtown, as well as the Rockaway Peninsula portion of Hempstead was included. The rest of Hempstead and the Towns of North Hempstead and Oyster Bay split from Queens County to form Nassau County in 1899. Prior to consolidation, Lloyd Neck, which was then part of the Town of Oyster Bay and had earlier been known as Queens Village, seceded from Queens County and became part of the Town of Huntington in Suffolk County in 1885.

=== Selected name origins ===
Selected name origins
Year	Origin of name
Hunters Point	Dominie's Hoek – named after Everardus Bogardus, dominie of New Netherlands – was divided into Hunters Point and Ravenswood. Jacob Bennett (died 1817), a descendant of Jan Bogardus and of one of the settlers of Dominie's Hoek, acquired sole ownership of the tract in 1767. The land, an extensive farm, upon Bogardus' death, passed to his daughter and son-in-law, Anne and George Hunter.
Jamaica	The "Jameco" tribe – or "Yam-may-ko" or "Yamecah" – in the Algonquin language, translates to "place of beaver," whence, as chronicled by some, Jamaica derived its name. The Jameco natives lived on the northern shore of what became known as Jamaica Bay and along Beaver Stream and Beaver Pond, which was filled in 1906. (Google Map aerial view of site of the former Beaver Pond)

=== Post-consolidation (after 1898) neighborhoods ===
Post-consolidation (after 1898) neighborhoods
1901:	Auburndale	Auburndale, east of Flushing, was originally 90 of a 117-acre farm of Thomas Seaman Willets (1853–1909), whose family had owned it since 1745. Willets, in 1901, sold it to the New England Development Company (New England Development & Improvement Company), a syndicate of East Coast investors that developed several residential projects in the Eastern U.S. The company subdivided Willets' farm into lots and streets and renamed it Auburndale. The LIRR opened a station there in May 1901 and named it Auburndale Station. The original Auburndale station was moved and converted into a church that survived until 1973. The name comes from Auburndale, Massachusetts, a suburb of Boston, and home of Lewis Henry Green (1868–1941), who then was President of the company.
1909:	Jackson Heights	Jackson Heights, until 1909, was known as Trains Meadow.
1925:	Rego Park	Rego Park and Middle Village was settled by Dutch farmers in 1653 as Whitepot, then part of Newtown. "Rego" is a portmanteau of "Real Good Construction Company" that began developing the area in 1925.
1970:	Flushing	Flushing is host to one of three large Asian American communities in the New York City. The other two are Chinatown on the Lower East Side of Manhattan and Sunset Park in Brooklyn. Outside of New York City, but within its metropolitan area, Bergen County, New Jersey – on the other side of Manhattan, just across the Hudson River – has the second largest concentration, per capita, of Asian Americans in New Jersey. Manhattan's Chinatown, the city's oldest Asian American neighborhood, began to flourish around 1870. Flushing, the second oldest, began to flourish in the 1970s, with the first wave of immigrants from Taiwan. Sunset Park, the newest in Queens, began to flourish as an Asian community in 1990. The city is home to about twelve Asian communities, including one in Corona, one in Whitestone, and one in Eastern Queens. Other city neighborhoods with emerging Asian communities include East Harlem, Manhattan. Outside of New York City, but within the city's metropolitan area, Edison, New Jersey, has a sizable Asian community. Bensonhurst, Brooklyn, is reputed to have the largest China-born population in New York City, but the neighborhood is not so densely populated as the Asian neighborhoods of those of Manhattan, Flushing, and Sunset Park.

=== Printers, publishers, and compilers of Queens directories ===
Printers, publishers, and compilers of Queens directories
1791–1795:	The New-York Directory and Register published – William Duncan (–1795) (compiler); John McComb (1763–1853) (cartographer); Cornelius Tiebout (1777–1832) (engraver); T. & J. Swords (printer) (§ Duncan's directory) Thomas Swords (1763–1843) and James Swords (1765–1846), Albany-born brothers, founded and ran the firm in New York City from 1788 to 1832, when Thomas retired. A daughter of Thomas Swords, Elizabeth Davidson Swords (1804–1833), on June 8, 1824, in Manhattan, married John Evers (1797–1884), an artist and one of the founders of the National Academy of Design.
1873:	Frederick William Beers (1839–1933), the cartographer who supervised the work of Atlas of Long Island, was one of several Beers family publishers who, after the Civil War, published state and county atlases. Frederick's father, James Botsford Beers (1811–1901), and uncle, Daniel Glover Beers (1841–1913), had their own publishing companies. Distinctive features of the Atlas of Long Island include notations of property owners, buildings, businesses, and statistical information.
1876:	Edward Augustus Whitney (1843–1917), surveyor of the Map of Long Island City. He was a cousin of Josiah Dwight Whitney, Jr. (1819–1896).
1878:	The first Queens telephone directory was issued 1878, by Bell Telephone Company of New York. It was printed on cardboard and could fit in a vest pocket. It listed 271 names.
1888:	Hugh A. Curtin (1843–1911) – no direct relationship to Dennis Curtin – was accused by Trow's company of plagiarism, and was tried in U.S. District Court before Judge Emile Henry Lacombe (1846–1924) just prior to publishing an 1888 edition of a Business Directory of New York, Brooklyn, and Newark.

== The evolution of Queens intra- and interconnectivity through transit ==
=== Bridges and tunnels ===
==== Dutch Kills ====
Dutch Kills bridges
1893:	Dutch Kills Swing Bridge, in Long Island City, is a single freight track of the Long Island Railroad. Designed as a swing bridge, it is now fixed into place. It opened in 1893. It crosses the Dutch Kills. It originally carried three tracks, but now only one.
1908:	Borden Avenue Bridge – a retractable bridge in the Long Island City carrying vehicular and pedestrian traffic across Dutch Kills, a tidal waterway that is a tributary of Newtown Creek – opened March 25, 1908. The main span is 84 feet (26 metres) long, and retracts by sliding on rail.
1910:	Hunters Point Avenue Bridge, 500 feet (150 metres) long, carries Hunters Point Avenue. It opened in 1910.
1910:	Cabin M Bridge – 1 track of the Montauk Cutoff – is a deck plate girder bridge (bascule design) over Dutch Kills Creek on the Long Island Railroad. Scherzer Rolling Lift Bridge Company of Chicago built it in 1910. Today, there is another abandoned track on the bridge. "Cabin M" was the name of a bygone train control tower. (Google Map aerial view of Hunters Point) (see Montauk Cutoff photos at Wikimedia Commons)
	DB Cabin Bridge – 1 track of the Montauk Branch – originally built to carry three tracks. "DB Cabin" was the name of a bygone tower that operated the bridge, south of the tracks on the west side of Dutch Kills.

==== East River bridges ====
East River bridges
1883:	The Brooklyn Bridge opened May 24, 1883, spanning the East River between Brooklyn and Lower Manhattan. It was the first bridge that connected Brooklyn to Manhattan – in a neighborhood that eventually became known as Two Bridges.
1909:	The Queensboro Bridge (aka 59th Street Bridge) – a Cantilever bridge – connecting Long Island City with the Upper East Side (passing over Roosevelt Island) – opened March 30, 1909. The bridge's upper level originally had two pedestrian walkways and two elevated railway tracks, which connected a spur of the IRT Second Avenue Elevated Line in Manhattan with the Queensboro Plaza station (opened November 16, 1916), and continued on to the Astoria–Ditmars Boulevard station (opened February 1, 1917).
1909:	The Manhattan Bridge opened December 31, 1909, spanning the East River between Brooklyn and Lower Manhattan. It is the second bridge that belongs to the neighborhood name, "Two Bridges".
1917:	The Hell Gate Bridge, for rail transit, opened March 9, 1917. The bridge, originally four tracks, now two, one for Amtrak's Northeast Corridor and one for freight across the Hell Gate, a strait of the East River, between Astoria in Queens, and Randalls and Wards Islands in Manhattan, connecting Manhattan, Bronx, and Queens.
1936:	The Triboro Bridge, connecting Manhattan, Bronx, and Queens, opened July 11, 1936.
1939:	The Bronx–Whitestone Bridge opened April 29, 1939.
1955:	The Roosevelt Island Bridge – connecting Roosevelt Island with Long Island City – opened May 18, 1955.
1961:	The Throgs Neck Bridge – carrying six lanes of Interstate 295 (I-295) over the East River where it meets the Long Island Sound, connecting Throggs Neck in the Bronx with Bay Terrace, Queens – opened January 11, 1961.

==== East River tunnels ====
East River tunnels
1910:	The East River Tunnels, which opened September 8, 1910 – four single-track railroad tunnels that extend from the eastern end of Penn Station under 32nd and 33rd Streets in Manhattan, crossing the East River to Long Island City. The tracks carry Long Island Rail Road and Amtrak, to and from Penn Station and points to the north and east. The tracks also carry New Jersey Transit trains deadheading to Sunnyside Yard. They are part of Amtrak's Northeast Corridor, used by trains traveling between New York City and New England via the Hell Gate Bridge.
1915:	The Steinway Tunnel, which opened June 13, 1915, is a pair of tunnels carrying the IRT Flushing Line (7 and <7> trains) of the New York City Subway under the East River between 42nd Street in Manhattan and 51st Avenue in Long Island City, Queens. It was originally designed and built as an interurban trolley tunnel (with a narrow loading gauge and height), with stations near the current Hunters Point Avenue and Grand Central stations.
1940:	The Queens–Midtown Tunnel – under the East River, connecting the East Side of Midtown Manhattan to Long Island City – opened November 15, 1940.
In development:	East Side Access

==== Newtown Creek bridges ====
Newtown Creek bridges
1830s:	Penny Bridge, crossing Newtown Creek, connection Newtown with Bushwick, named for the price of a pedestrian to cross. It was torn down in 1939 following the completion of the nearby Kosciuszko Bridge.
1852:	In 1852, Neziah Bliss opened the first drawbridge, which was called the Blissville Bridge, crossing Newtown Creek, connecting Greenpoint, Brooklyn, with Blissville, Queens. Functionally, it is near, on the on same site as the first drawbridge built in the 1850s by Neziah Bliss. This bridge helped Greenpoint flourish as an industrial community.
1902:	Grand Street Bridge – a through-truss swing bridge over Newtown Creek, that links Grand Street and Grand Avenue via a two-lane, height-restricted roadway, connecting Brooklyn and Queens – opened 1902.
1933:	The Metropolitan Avenue Bridge – a drawbridge crossing English Kills (a tributary of Newtown Creek), connecting Manhattan, Bronx, and Queens – opened March 27, 1933.
1939:	The Pulaski Bridge – crossing Newtown Creek and connecting Long Island City to Greenpoint, Brooklyn – opened September 10, 1954.
1987:	The Greenpoint Avenue Bridge (aka J. J. Byrne Memorial Bridge) – carries Greenpoint Avenue across Newtown Creek, connecting Blissville, Queens, with Greenpoint – opened 1987. The bridge was named after James J. Byrne (1865–1930), who, from September 1926 until his death March 14, 1930, served as the Brooklyn Borough President. He had previously been Brooklyn Commissioner of Public Works.
2017:	The Kosciuszko Bridge – connecting Greenpoint in Brooklyn to Maspeth in Queens – opened April 2017.

==== Flushing River bridges, causeways, and trestles ====
Flushing River bridges and causeways
1938:	Long Island Rail Road's Port Washington Branch trestle
1938:	Porpoise Bridge – a closed-spandrel arch bridge for vehicles crossing Flushing Creek on Meridian Road – was built as a tidal gate for Flushing Creek. (Google Map aerial view of the Porpoise Bridge in Flushing Meadows).

==== Jamaica Bay bridges ====
Jamaica Bay bridges
1970:	Cross Bay Veterans Memorial Bridge – a toll bridge that carries Cross Bay Boulevard across Jamaica Bay in Queens, between Broad Channel and the Rockaway Peninsula – opened May 28, 1970.
1988:	Joseph P. Addabbo Memorial Bridge – a six-lane bride that carries Cross Bay Boulevard across Jamaica Bay in Queens, New York City, between Howard Beach and Broad Channel – opened October 25, 1988.
1956:	North Channel Swing Bridge (not actually a movable bridge – carrying the A train – opened 1956–1958.) Howard Beach to Broad Channel.
1956:	Beach Channel Drawbridge – a rapid transit line of the IND Division of the New York City Subway, operating in Queens, branches from the IND Fulton Street Line at Rockaway Boulevard, extending over the Jamaica Bay, into the Rockaways. It opened 1956–1958.
	102nd Street Bridge – connecting Hamilton Beach at Russell Street with Howard Beach, also known as "Lenihan's Bridge".
	Hawtree Creek Bridge – 163rd Avenue and 99th Street in Howard Beach across to Hamilton Beach at Rau Court and Davenport Court.

==== Rockaway Inlet Bridge ====
Rockaway Inlet bridge
1937:	The Marine Parkway–Gil Hodges Memorial Bridge – a vertical-lift bridge, crossing the Rockaway Inlet, connecting the Rockaway Peninsula in Queens, with Flatbush Avenue to Floyd Bennett Field, Belt Parkway, and the Marine Park neighborhood in Brooklyn – opened July 3, 1937.

=== Long Island directories that include Queens communities ===
Long Island directories that include Queens communities
Year	Title	Printer	Compiler(s)	Google Books	HathiTrust	Internet Archive	Other
1878–1879	Lain's Directory of Long Island – Including a Business Directory of Brooklyn, Long Island City, and the Towns of Kings County, Bath, Bay Ridge, Canarsie, Coney Island, East New York, Flatbush, Flatlands, Fort Hamilton, Gravesend, Guntherville, New Utrecht, Parkville, Sheepshead Bay, and Unionville; Together With a General Directory of Amityville, Babylon, Bay Ridge, Bay Side, Breslau, Bridgehampton, College Point, East Hampton, East Williamsburgh, Farmingdale, Flatbush, Flushing, Fort Hamilton, Freeport, Garden City, Glen Cove, Greenport, Hempstead, Hicksville, Huntington, Islip, Jamaica, Jericho, Locust Valley, Maspeth, Mattituck, Mineola, Newtown, Northport, Oyster Bay, Parkville, Patchogue, Pearsalls, Port Jefferson, Queens, Riverhead, Rockaway, Rockville Centre, Roslyn, Sag Harbor, Sayville, Shelter Island, Southampton, Southold, Springfield, Stoney Brook, Valley Stream, West Hampton, Whitestone, Winfield, Woodhaven, Woodsburgh	Lain & Company (publisher)	George Theodore Lain (1844–1893) (compiler)			Part 1. Allen County; Part 2. Allen County; Part 2. Allen County	

=== Boyd's directory ===
Boyd's directory
Year	Title	Printer	Compiler(s)	Google Books	HathiTrust	Internet Archive	Other
1864	Boyd's Directory of Astoria, East New York, Flatbush, Flushing, Glen Cove, Greenport, Hempstead, Huntington, Jamaica, Newtown, Patchogue, Port Jefferson, Riverhead, Sag Harbor, and Setuaket, Long Island – With a Business Directory of Patrons to the Work – And An Appendix of Much General Information, 1864–5	William Andrew Boyd (1850–1918) (publisher); J.F. Morris & Co. (Joseph F. Morris; born Nov 1853 Rhode Island) (printer)	William Andrew Boyd (1850–1918) (compiler)				Patty Fagan.. (transcriber); Ancestry.com.

=== Duncan's directory ===
Duncan's directory
Year	Title	Printer	Compiler(s)	Google Books	HathiTrust	Internet Archive	Other
1794	The New-York Directory and Register for the Year 1794 – Illustrated With a New and Accurate Plan of the City and Part of Long-Island, Exactly Laid Down Agreeably to the Latest Survey ...	T. & J. Swords (printer)	William Duncan (compiler)		Columbia University	Columbia University	

=== Curtin's Long Island directories ===
Curtin's Long Island directories
Year	Title	Printer	Compiler(s)	Google Books	HathiTrust	Internet Archive	Other
1865–1866	Curtin's Directory of Astoria, East New York, Flatbush, Flushing, Glen Cove, Greenport, Hempstead, Huntington, Jamaica, Newtown, Patchogue, Port Jefferson, Riverhead, Sag Harbor, and Setauket, Long Island – With a Business Directory of Patrons of the Work, And An Appendix Containing Important Information, 1865–66	Dennis P. Curtin (publisher)					Ancestry.com.
1867–1868	Curtin's Directory of Astoria, East New York, Flatbush, Flushing, Glen Cove, Greenport, Hempstead, Huntington, Jamaica, Newtown, Patchogue, Port Jefferson, Riverhead, Rockaway, Roslyn, Sag Harbor, and Setauket, Long Island – With a Business Directory of Patrons of the Work, 1867–8 (2nd ed.)	Dennis P. Curtin (publisher)					Ancestry.com.
1868–1869	Curtin's Directory of Astoria, Babylon, Bath, Canarsie, Coldspring, College Point, Cypress Hill, East New York, Farmingdale, Flatbush, Flushing, Glen Cove, Greenpoint, Greenport, Hempstead, Huntington, Islip, Jamaica, Long Island City, Newtown, New Lotts, New Utrecht, Orient, Oyster Bay, Patchogue, Port Jefferson, River Head, Rockaway, Roslyn, Sag Harbor, Southold, Stonybrook and Woodhaven, Long Island. With a Business Directory of Patrons of the Work. 1868–9 (3rd ed.)	Dennis P. Curtin (publisher)					Ancestry.com.
1871–1872	Curtin's Directory of Amityville, Babylon, Breslau, College Point, East New York, Flatbush, Flushing, Glen Cove, Gravesend, Greenpoint, Hempstead, Huntington, Islip, Jamaica, Long Island City, Newtown, New Utrecht, Oyster Bay, Patchogue, Port Jefferson, Riverhead, Rockaway, Roslyn, Sag Harbor, Sayville, Southold, Stonybrook, Whitestone and Woodhaven, Long Island – With a Business Directory of Patrons of the Work, 1871–72 (6th ed.)	Dennis P. Curtin (publisher)					Ancestry.com.
1872–1873	Curtin's Brooklyn Business Directory – Together With General Directory of Amityville, Babylon, Breslau, College Point, East New York, Flatbush, Flushing, Glen Cove, Gravesend, Greenpoint, Hempstead, Huntington, Islip, Jamaica, Long Island City, Newtown, New Utrecht, Oyster Bay, Patchogue, Port Jefferson, Riverhead, Rockaway, Roslyn, Sag Harbor, Sayville, Southold, Stonybrook, Whitestone and Woodhaven, Long Island, 1872–3 (7th ed.)	Dennis P. Curtin (publisher)				Long Island Historical Society; Allen County	
1873–1874	Curtin's Brooklyn Business Directory – Together With General Directory of Amityville, Babylon, Breslau, College Point, East New York, Flatbush, Flushing, Glen Cove, Gravesend, Greenpoint, Hempstead, Huntington, Islip, Jamaica, Long Island City, Newtown, New Utrecht, Oyster Bay, Patchogue, Port Jefferson, Riverhead, Rockaway, Roslyn, Sag Harbor, Sayville, Southold, Stonybrook, Whitestone and Woodhaven, Long Island, 1873–4 (9th ed.)	Dennis P. Curtin (publisher)				Long Island Historical Society	

=== Flushing directories ===
Flushing directories
Year	Title	Printer	Compiler(s)	Google Books	HathiTrust	Internet Archive	Other
1885–1886	Boyd's Flushing Directory, 1885–6 – Containing a General Directory of Flushing, Together With a Complete Business and Farmers' Directory of the North Side Division L.I.R.R. for the Years 1885–6	William Andrew Boyd (1850–1918) (publisher); J.F. Morris & Co. (Joseph F. Morris; born Nov 1853 Rhode Island) (printer)	William Andrew Boyd (1850–1918) (compiler)			Allen County	
1890–1891	Flushing Village Directory, 1890–91 – Containing a Correct Compilation of the Residents of Flushing, N.Y., Together With a Business and Official Directory, Corporations Societies, Lodges, Etc.	The Flushing Journal (Charles W. Smith; 1845–1913) (publisher)				Allen County	
1891–1892	Flushing Directory, Containing a General Directory of Flushing – Together With a Complete Business Directory for the Years 1891–92	Boyd's Directory Company (William Andrew Boyd; 1850–1918) (publisher)	Boyd's Directory Company (William Andrew Boyd; 1880–1918) (compiler)			Allen County	

=== Trow's Queens business and residential directories ===
Trow's Queens business and residential directories
Year	Title	Printer	Compiler(s)	Google Books	HathiTrust	Internet Archive	Other
1898	Trow's Business and Residential Directory of the Borough of Queens, City of New York – Classified Under Business Headings and Fully Indexed – Also Arranged in Alphabetical Order of Names. Also a Register of the Borough Government (Vol. 1)	The Trow Directory, Printing & Bookbinding Co. (publisher)				Allen County	FamilySearch. FamilySearch. LCCN 01-31573
1899	Trow's Business and Residential Directory of the Borough of Queens, City of New York – Classified Under Business Headings and Fully Indexed – Also Arranged in Alphabetical Order of Names. Also a Register of the Borough Government (Vol. 2)	The Trow Directory, Printing & Bookbinding Co. (publisher)			Harvard		LCCN 01-31573

=== Trow's Queens business directories ===
Trow's Queens business directories
Year	Title	Printer	Compiler(s)	Google Books	HathiTrust	Internet Archive	Other
1899	Trow's Business Directory of the Borough of Queens, City of New York – Classified Under Business Headings and Fully Indexed – Also a Register of the Borough Government (Vol. 2)	The Trow Directory, Printing & Bookbinding Co. (publisher)		Harvard	Harvard		
1904	Trow Business Directory of the Borough of Queens, City of New York – Classified Under Business Headings and Fully Indexed. Also Residential Directory of Flushing, Jamaica, Long Island City, and Richmond Hill (Vol. 6)	The Trow Directory, Printing & Bookbinding Co. (publisher)				Allen County	
1909–1910	Trow Business Directory of the Borough of Queens, City of New York – Classified Under Business Headings and Fully Indexed. Also Red Residential Directory of Flushing, Jamaica, Long Island City and Richmond Hill, 1909–1910 (Vol. 9)	The Trow Directory, Printing & Bookbinding Co. (publisher)					FamilySearch. (image 206); FamilySearch. (image 198) (NYPL)
1912	Trow Business Directory of the Borough of Queens, City of New York – Also Residential Directory of Flushing, Jamaica, Long Island City, and Richmond Hill (Vol. 10)	The Trow Directory, Printing & Bookbinding Co. (publisher)					Ancestry.com. (Newark Public Library); Family Search. (image 322); Family Search. (image 314) (NYPL); OCLC 1226742505

=== Trow's Brooklyn and Queens business directories ===
Trow's Brooklyn and Queens business directories
Year	Title	Printer	Compiler(s)	Google Books	HathiTrust	Internet Archive	Other
1903	Trow Business Directory of the Boroughs of Brooklyn and Queens, City of New York – Arranged Under Business Classifications by Boroughs and Fully Indexed – Also Contains a Brooklyn Street Directory (Vol. 6)	The Trow Directory, Printing & Bookbinding Co. (publisher)				Allen County	LCCN 99-1769
1904	Trow Business Directory of the Boroughs of Brooklyn and Queens, City of New York – Arranged Under Business Classifications by Boroughs and Fully Indexed – Also Contains a Brooklyn Street Directory (Vol. 7)	The Trow Directory, Printing & Bookbinding Co. (publisher)				Allen County	
1907	Trow Business Directory of the Boroughs of Brooklyn and Queens, City of New York – Arranged Under Business Classifications by Boroughs and Fully Indexed – Also Contains a Brooklyn Street Directory (Vol. 10)	The Trow Directory, Printing & Bookbinding Co. (publisher)				Allen County	
1908	Trow Business Directory of the Boroughs of Brooklyn and Queens, City of New York – Arranged Under Business Classifications by Boroughs and Fully Indexed – Also Contains a Brooklyn Street Directory (Vol. 11)	The Trow Directory, Printing & Bookbinding Co. (publisher)				Allen County	

=== Brooklyn business directories that include Queens communities ===
Brooklyn business directories that include Queens communities
Year	Title	Printer	Compiler(s)	Google Books	HathiTrust	Internet Archive	Other
1890–1891	Lain's Business Directory of Brooklyn, Kings County, Long Island City, Jamaica, Far Rockaway, Flushing, College Point, Hempstead, Newtown and Whitestone, for 1890–91	Lain & Company (publisher)	George Theodore Lain (1844–1893) (compiler)	University of Wisconsin	University of Wisconsin		

=== Queens business registers ===
Queens business registers
Year	Title	Printer	Compiler(s)	Google Books	HathiTrust	Internet Archive	Other
1899	Register of the Borough of Queens – Containing Asylums and Homes, Banks, Benefit Societies, Churches, Clubs, Day Nurseries, Dispensaries, Hospitals, Ferries, Fraternal Societies, Libraries, Medical Colleges, Institutions, and Societies, Societies, Trade Associations	The Trow Directory, Printing & Bookbinding Co. (publisher)		Google Books			

=== Copartnership directories: Brooklyn and Queens ===
Copartnership directories: Brooklyn and Queens
Year	Title	Printer	Compiler(s)	Google Books	HathiTrust	Internet Archive	Other
1913–1914	Corporation and Copartnership Directory of the Boroughs of Brooklyn and Queens, City of New York	Brooklyn Directory Co. (publisher)	Brooklyn Directory Co. (compiler)			Allen County Public Library	
1922	Polk's 1922 Copartnership and Corporation Directory – Boroughs of Brooklyn and Queens	R.L. Polk & Co. (publisher)	R.L. Polk & Co. (compiler)			Allen County Public Library (part 1); Allen County Public Library (part 2)	

=== Polk's directories: Queens and Richmond ===
Polk's directories: Queens and Richmond
Year	Title	Printer	Compiler(s)	Google Books	HathiTrust	Internet Archive	Other
1933–1934	Polk's New York City Directory (Boroughs of Queens and Richmond) – Containing an Alphabetical Directory of Business Concerns and Private Citizens, With Wives' First Names Shown and Street and Avenue Guide and Much Information of Miscellaneous Character; Also a Buyers' Guide and Complete Classified Business Directory, 1933–4 (Vol. 1)	R.L. Polk & Co., Inc. (publisher)	Brooklyn Directory Co. (compiler)				NYPL; NYPL

=== Telephone directories ===
Telephone directories
Year	Title	Printer	Compiler(s)	Google Books	HathiTrust	Internet Archive	Other
1895	National Telephone Directory (October 1895) "New York". pp. 184–354. "Astoria". pp. 187–188. "Far Rockaway". pp. 243–244. "Flushing". pp. 245–246. "Jamaica". p. 248. "Long Island City". pp. 250–251.	American Telephone and Telegraph Company (publisher); H.D. Winton Printing & Publishing Co. (Henry D. Winton; 1848–1917) (printer)		NYPL			
1909	New York City (Including All Boroughs) Telephone Directory (October 14, 1909)	New York Telephone Company (publisher)				Brooklyn Public Library	
1910	New York City (Including All Boroughs) Telephone Directory → "Brooklyn and Queens" p. 437 (February 3, 1910)	New York Telephone Company (publisher)				Brooklyn Public Library	
1914	New York City (Including All Boroughs) Telephone Directory (October 15, 1914)	New York Telephone Company (publisher)				Brooklyn Public Library	
1915	New York City (Including All Boroughs) Telephone Directory (May 6, 1915)	New York Telephone Company (publisher)				Brooklyn Public Library	
1917	New York City (Including All Boroughs) Telephone Directory (February 1, 1917)	New York Telephone Company (publisher)				Brooklyn Public Library	
1917	New York City (Including All Boroughs) Telephone Directory (October 11, 1917)	New York Telephone Company (publisher)				Brooklyn Public Library	
1920	New York City (Including All Boroughs) Telephone Directory (February 4, 1920)	New York Telephone Company (publisher)				Brooklyn Public Library	
1924	Brooklyn, Queens, Staten Island – New York City Telephone Directory (October 3, 1924)	New York Telephone Company (publisher)				Brooklyn Public Library	
1925	Brooklyn, Queens, Staten Island – New York City Telephone Directory (May 6, 1925)	New York Telephone Company (publisher)				Brooklyn Public Library	
1925	Brooklyn, Queens, Staten Island – New York City Telephone Directory (October 7, 1925)	New York Telephone Company (publisher)				Brooklyn Public Library	
1926	Brooklyn, Queens, Staten Island – New York City Telephone Directory (May 5, 1926)	New York Telephone Company (publisher)				Brooklyn Public Library	
1927	Brooklyn, Queens, Staten Island – New York City Telephone Directory (May 5, 1927)	New York Telephone Company (publisher)				Brooklyn Public Library	
1927–1928	Donnelley's Red Book Classified Telephone Directory – Queens (Winter, December–June, 1927–1928)	The Reuben H. Donnelley Corporation (publisher)				Brooklyn Public Library	
1928	Brooklyn, Queens, Staten Island – New York City Telephone Directory (May 5, 1928)	New York Telephone Company (publisher)				Brooklyn Public Library	
1928	Donnelley's Red Book Classified Telephone Directory – Queens (Summer, June–December, 1928)	The Reuben H. Donnelley Corporation (publisher)				Brooklyn Public Library	
1939	Queens – New York City – Telephone Directory (Winter 1939–40)	New York Telephone Company (publisher)					NYPL

=== Social welfare agencies ===
Social welfare agencies
Year	Title	Printer	Compiler(s)	Google Books	HathiTrust	Internet Archive	Other
1934	Directory of Social Agencies and Resources in the Borough of Queens	Queensboro Council for Social Welfare (publisher)					OCLC 921147971, 1102180731

=== Early censuses ===
Early Censuses
Year	Title	Printer	Compiler(s)	Google Books	HathiTrust	Internet Archive	Other
1790	Heads of Families at the First Census of the United States Taken Taken in the Year 1790 – "New York" – "Queens County" (pp. 149–158)	Department of Commerce and Labor, Bureau of the Census (publisher); Government Printing Office (printed 1908)		Stanford		Cornell	LCCN 07-35273; OCLC 2080540 (all editions) census.gov

=== Churches ===
Churches
Year	Title	Printer	Compiler(s)	Google Books	HathiTrust	Internet Archive	Other
1880	Antiquities of the Parish Church, Jamaica (Including Newtown and Flushing) Illustrated From Letters of the Missionaries, and Other Authentic Documents, With a Continuation of the History of Grace Church to the Present Time	Charles Welling (publisher)	Henry Onderdonk, Jr. (1804–1886)			Allen County Public Library	
1897	History of St. George's Parish, Flushing, Long Island	Saint George's Sword and Shield (publisher); Flushing Evening Journal (printer)	J. Carpenter Smith, S.T.D. (1847–1897)	Harvard; Harvard	Harvard; Harvard	Allen County Public Library; Harvard	
1958	The Parish Under God (St. Luke's Episcopal Church, Forest Hills)		Stanley Charles Rayfield (1901–1983)			Allen County Public Library	

=== Cemeteries ===
Cemeteries
Year	Title	Printer	Compiler(s)	Google Books	HathiTrust	Internet Archive	Other
1881	The Cemeteries of New York, and How to Reach Them	G.H. Burton (George H. Burton; 1847–1915) (printer)	Selden C. Judson (Selden C. Judson; 1842–1920)		Library of Congress	Library of Congress	
1895	The Leonard Manual of the Cemeteries of New York and Vicinity	J.H. Leonard (John Henry Leonard) (publisher)	J.H. Leonard (John Henry Leonard) (compiler)		Library of Congress	Library of Congress	
1901	The Leonard Manual of the Cemeteries of New York and Vicinity	J.H. Leonard (John Henry Leonard) (publisher)	J.H. Leonard (John Henry Leonard) (compiler)		Library of Congress	Library of Congress	
1987	Permanent New Yorkers – A Biographical Guide to the Cemeteries of New York	Chelsea Green Publishing Company (publisher)	Judi Culbertson (née Charlotte Judi Chaffee; born 1941) & Tom Randall (Thomas Joseph Randall; born 1945)			Culbertson, Judi; Randall, Tom (1987). Sausalito Public Library. Chelsea Green Publishing Company. ISBN 9780930031114.	

=== Maps ===
Maps
Year	Title	Printer	Compiler(s)	Google Books	HathiTrust	Internet Archive	Other
1852	Map of Newtown, Long Island – Designed to Exhibit the Localities Referred to in the 'Annals of Newtown', compiled by J. Riker, Jr., 1852	James Riker, Jr. (publisher)					NYPL
1872	Map of Kings County, With Parts of Westchester, Queens, New York & Richmond Counties – Showing Farm Lines, Soundings, &c.	M. Dripps (Matthew Dripps; 1812–1896) (publisher)					Library of Congress
1874	Map of Long Island City, Queens Co. N.Y., Showing Farm Lines, &c., &c. – Reduced From the Commissioners New City Map	M. Dripps (publisher)					Library of Congress; Brooklyn Public Library
1876	Map of Long Island City, Queens Co., N.Y (includes changes in street names)	E. Whitney (publisher)	E. Whitney (surveyor)				Library of Congress
1886	New Nap of Kings and Queens Counties, New York – From Actual Surveys	J.B. Beers & Co. (James Botsford Beers; 1811–1901) (publisher)					NYPL
1894	Map of the Village of Flushing, Queens County, New York	G.A. Roullier (Gustave Augustus Roullier; 1849–1910) (publisher)	G.A. Roullier & Robert A. Welcke (Robert Alexander Welcke; 1848–1936) (surveyors)				Library of Congress

=== Atlases ===
Atlases
Year	Title	Printer	Compiler(s)	Google Books	HathiTrust	Internet Archive	Other
1891	Atlas of Queens County, Long Island, New York	Chester Wolverton (1851–1908) (publisher)	Chester Wolverton (supervising editor)				NYPL; LCCN 2011-594401
1901	Atlas of the Borough of Queens, City of New York – Complete in Three Volumes: Vol. 1. "Fourth and Fifth Wards. Jamaica and Rockaway"; Vol. 2. "Third Ward. Flushing"; Vol. 3. "First and Second Wards. Long Island City and Newtown"	E. Belcher Hyde (publisher)	Hugo Ullitz, C.E. (supervising editor)				NYPL
1909	Atlas of the City of New York, Borough of Queens, Long Island City, Newtown, Flushing, Jamaica, Far Rockaway	G.W. Bromley & Co. (George W. Bromley) (publisher)					NYPL
1913	Atlas of the Borough of Queens, City of New York – Complete in Three Volumes: Vol. 1. "Westerly Part of Jamaica – Part of Ward 4"	E. Belcher Hyde (publisher)	Hugo Ullitz, C.E. (supervising editor)				NYPL
1915	Atlas of the Borough of Queens, City of New York: Vol. 2A. "Newtown – Ward 2"	E. Belcher Hyde (publisher)	Hugo Ullitz, C.E. (supervising editor)				NYPL
1918	Atlas of the Borough of Queens, City of New York – Complete in Three Volumes: Vol. 1A. "Easterly Part of Jamaica – Part of Ward 4"	E. Belcher Hyde (publisher)	Hugo Ullitz, C.E. (supervising editor)				NYPL
1919	Atlas of the Borough of Queens, City of New York: Vol. 2. "Long Island City – Ward 2"	E. Belcher Hyde (publisher)	Hugo Ullitz, C.E. (supervising editor)				NYPL
2016	Nonstop Metropolis: A New York City Atlas (historical perspective essays)	University of California Press (publisher)	Rebecca Solnit; Joshua Jelly-Schapiro (editors); Molly Roy (cartographer)	Google Books (limited preview); Google Books (limited preview)			LCCN 2016-15756

=== Birth, death, marriage records ===
Birth, death, marriage records
Year	Title	Printer	Compiler(s)	Google Books	HathiTrust	Internet Archive	Other
1913	Baptismal Record of the Reformed Dutch Church at Newtown, Long Island, New York, 1736 to 1846. Marriages by Rev. Garretson at Newtown from 1835 to 1846		Josephine C. Frost (Mrs. Samuel Knapp Frost) (transcriber)		Library of Congress	Library of Congress	LCCN 14-12730

=== History ===
History
Year	Title	Printer	Compiler(s)	Google Books	HathiTrust	Internet Archive	Other
1845	A History of Long Island, From Its First Settlement by Europeans, to the Year 1845, With Special Reference to Its Ecclesiastical Concerns	Robert Carter (publisher); Henry Ludwig (Heinrich Ludwig; 1805–1877) (printer)	Nathaniel Scudder Prime (1785–1856)	Harvard; Stanford	Harvard	Library of Congress	
1846	Documents and Letters Intended to Illustrate the Revolutionary Incidents of Queens County; With Connecting Narratives, Explanatory Notes, and Additions	Leavitt, Trow and Company (printer)	Henry Onderdonk, Jr. (1804–1886)	Harvard; Indiana University; British Library; NYPL; NYPL	Harvard; Harvard; Columbia; NYPL; NYPL; Library of Congress	Harvard; Columbia; NYPL; Library of Congress	
1846	History of New Netherland; or New York Under the Dutch (the appendix includes a list of land patents issued by the Dutch from 1630–1664. Vol. 2 (2nd ed.). pp. 581–593.)	D. Appleton & Company (publisher)	Edmund Bailey O'Callaghan, M.D. (1897–1880)	V. 1. UC San Diego (1846); V. 2. UC Riverside (1848); V. 1 (2nd ed). Michigan (1855); V. 2 (2nd ed). Stanford (1855)			
1847	A Sketch of the History of the Presbyterian Church, in Jamaica, L.I. (see First Presbyterian Church in Jamaica)	Leavitt, Trow and Company (printer)	James Madison MacDonald (1812–1876)	NYPL	NYPL	Library of Congress	
1852	The Annals of Newtown, in Queens County, New-York: Containing Its History From Its First Settlement, Together With Many Interesting Facts Concerning the Adjacent Towns; Also, a Particular Account of Numerous Long Island Families Now Spread Over This and Various Other States of the Union	D. Fanshaw (Daniel Fanshaw; 1788–1860) (publisher)	James Riker, Jr. (1822–1889)	Princeton	Library of Congress; Columbia; Princeton	Princeton	
1862	Two Centuries in the History of the Presbyterian Church, Jamaica, L.I.; The Oldest Existing Church, of the Presbyterian Name, in America. (see First Presbyterian Church in Jamaica)	Robert Carter & Brothers (Robert Carter; 1807–1889) (printer)	James Madison MacDonald (1812–1876)	Wisconsin Historical Society	Wisconsin Historical Society	Princeton	LCCN 06-42198
1882	History of Queens County, New York: With Illustrations, Portraits, and Sketches of Prominent Families and Individuals	W.W. Munsell & Co. (William Watkins Munsell; 1850–1919) (publisher); George Macnamara (1845–1931) (printer)			Columbia University	Columbia University	LCCN 01-14233
1882	New York by Sunlight and Gaslight – A Work Descriptive of the Great American Metropolis; Its High and Low Life; Its Splendors and Miseries; Its Virtues and Vices; Its Gorgeous Places and Dark Homes of Poverty and Crime; Its Public Men, Politicians, Adventurers; Its Charities, Frauds, Mysteries, Etc. Etc.	Union Publishing House (publisher); Charles L. Snyder (president)	James Dabney McCabe (1842–1883)	University of Chicago		Columbia University	
1885	Bayles' Long Island Handbook, 1885	Ritchard Mather Bayles (1846–1930) (publisher); Budget Steam Print (printer)	Ritchard Mather Bayles (1846–1930)	Harvard	Harvard	Harvard	
1896	Early Long Island – A Colonial Study	G.P. Putnam's Sons (publisher); The Knickerbocker Press (printer)	Martha Bockée Flint (1841–1900)	NYPL	Library of Congress	Cornell University	LCCN 01-28287
1896	History of Long Island City, New York. A Record of Its Early Settlement and Corporate Progress. Sketches of the Villages That Were Absorbed in the Growth of the Present Municipality. Its Business, Finance, Manufactures, and Form of Government, With Some Notice of the Men Who Built the City	Long Island Star Publishing Company (publisher)	Joel Smith Kelsey (1848–1924)		Library of Congress	Library of Congress; Allen County Public Library	
1897	Prominent Families of New York – Being An Account In Biographical Form of Individuals and Families Distinguished as Representatives of Social, Professional and Civic Life of New York City	The Historical Company	Nicoll & Roy Company (printer & binder)		Library of Congress	Library of Congress	
1898	Prominent Families of New York, Index	The Historical Company	Nicoll & Roy Company (printer & binder)	Harvard		Allen County Public Library	
1898	Prominent Families of New York – Being An Account In Biographical Form of Individuals and Families Distinguished as Representatives of Social, Professional and Civic Life of New York City (Revised ed.)	The Historical Company	Nicoll & Roy Company (printer & binder)	University of Iowa		Cornell	
1899	History of the Town of Flushing, Long Island, New York	J. H. Ridenour (John Henry Ridenour; 1858–1928) (publisher)	Rev. Henry Davey Waller (1852–1925)		Cornell; Library of Congress	Allen County Public Library; Library of Congress	
1908	Illustrated History of the Borough of Queens, New York City	F. T. Smiley Publishing Co. (publisher) (Frederick Thomas Smiley; 1857–1910) (Jerome Chester Smiley; 1882–1968) (George W. Flaacke)	George Hugo August Eugen von Skal (1854–1924); For the Flushing Journal	Library of Congress	Library of Congress	Library of Congress	
1909	Historical Guide to the City of New York. Part 4: "Borough of Queens"	Frederick A. Stokes Company (publisher)	City History Club of New York; Frank Bergen Kelley (1867–1934) (compiler)	New York Public Library		Library of Congress	
1911	Civic Bibliography for Greater New York (Russell Sage Foundation)	New York Research Council, Charities Publication Committee (publisher)	James Bronson Reynolds (1861–1924) (editor)	Harvard			
1913	Historical Guide to the City of New York. "Part 4: "Borough of Queens" (rev. ed.)	Frederick A. Stokes Company (publisher)	City History Club of New York; Frank Bergen Kelley (1867–1934) (compiler); Edward Hagaman Hall (1858–1936) (editor)			Library of Congress	
1913	Queens Borough – Being a descriptive and illustrated book of the Borough of Queens setting forth its many advantages and possibilities as a section wherein to live, to work and to succeed	The Manufacturing and Industrial Committee of the Chamber of Commerce of the Borough of New York (publisher); Brooklyn Eagle Press (printer)	Walter Irving Willis (1882–1937) (compiler & editor)		Library of Commerce		
1913	The Refugees of 1776 From Long Island to Connecticut	J.B. Lyon & Co. (James B. Lyon; 1858–1924) (printer)	Frederic Gregory Mather (1844–1925)	UC Berkeley; University of Michigan			
1914	Records of the Town of Jamaica, 1656–1751	Long Island Historical Society (publisher)	Josephine C. Frost (Mrs. Samuel Knapp Frost) (née Josephine Crossette Mayou; 1864–1942) (editor)	Vol. 1. University of Minnesota; Vol. 2. University of Minnesota; Vol. 3. University of Minnesota	Vol. 1. University of Minnesota; Vol. 2. University of Minnesota; Vol. 3. University of Minnesota	Vol. 1. NYPL; Vol. 2. NYPL; Vol. 3. Library of Congress	
1914	The Origin and History of Grace Church, Jamaica, New York	The Shakespeare Press; Registered trade name of Charles H. Cochrane (publisher)	Horatio Oliver Ladd (1839–1832)	University of Wisconsin – Madison	Library of Congress	Princeton Seminary	
1915	Memorandum With Respect to Proposed Legislation Which Would Sever and Disjoin the Fifth Ward, Borough of Queens From the City of New York: And Erect Said Fifth Ward Into a New City, to Be Known as Rockaway City					University of California	
1915	Queens Borough – The Borough of Homes and Industry – A descriptive and illustrated book setting forth its wonderful growth and development in commerce, industry and homes during the past few years; and its many attractions, advantages and possibilities as a section wherein to live, to work and to succeed	The Manufacturing and Industrial Committee of the Chamber of Commerce of the Borough of New York (publisher); Long Island Star Publishing Company (printer)	Walter Irving Willis (1882–1937) (compiler & editor)		Library of Commerce		
1917	History of the Rockaways, From the Year 1885 to 1917 – Being a complete record and review of events of historical importance during that period in the Rockaway peninsula, comprising the villages of Hewlett, Woodmere, Cedarhurst, Lawrence, Inwood, Far Rockaway, Arverne, Rockaway Beach, Belle Harbor, Neponsit and Rockaway Point	Bellot's Histories, Inc. (publisher)	Alfred Henry Bellot (1882–1965)	Wisconsin Historic Society; Dalcassian Publishing (limited preview)		Brooklyn Public Library; Cornell University	
1918	History of the Rockaways, From the Year 1885 to 1917 – Being a complete record and review of events of historical importance during that period in the Rockaway peninsula, comprising the villages of Hewlett, Woodmere, Cedarhurst, Lawrence, Inwood, Far Rockaway, Arverne, Rockaway Beach, Belle Harbor, Neponsit and Rockaway Point (2nd ed.)	Bellot's Histories, Inc. (publisher)	Alfred Henry Bellot (1882–1965)	Wisconsin Historic Society		Library of Congress	
1920	Queens Borough, New York City, 1910–1920 – The Borough of Homes and Industry – A descriptive and illustrated book setting forth its wonderful growth and development in commerce, industry and homes during the past ten years, 1910 to 1920; a prediction of even greater growth during the next ten years, 1920 to 1930; and a statement of its many advantages, attractions and possibilities as a section wherein to live, to work and to succeed	Chamber of Commerce of the Borough of New York (publisher); Long Island Star Publishing Company (printer)	Walter Irving Willis (1882–1937) (compiler & editor)	Harvard	Harvard; Library of Congress	Prelinger Library	
1923	Landmarks of New York – An Historical Guide to the Metropolis	City History Club of New York (publisher)	Arthur Everett Peterson, PhD (1871–1943) (editor)	UC Berkeley	UC Berkeley		
1924	Keskachauge – Or the First White Settlement on Long Island''	G.P. Putnam's Sons (publisher)	Frederick Van Wyck (1853–1936)	Wisconsin Historical Society			
1924	Landmarks of New York – An Historical Guide to the Metropolis	City History Club of New York (publisher)	Arthur Everett Peterson, PhD (1871–1943) (editor)	New York Public Library	New York Public Library		
1925	Guide Book to the Noted Places on Long Island, Historical and Otherwise (No. 1) Landmarks on the Montauk Highway – and Long Island Directory With Map		Eugene Louis Armbruster (1865–1943)				New York Heritage; LCCN 26-11518; OCLC 987917756 (all editions)
1925	The Boroughs of Brooklyn and Queens Counties of Nassau and Suffolk Long Island, New York, 1609–1924	Lewis Historical Publishing Company, Inc. (publisher)	Henry "Harry" Isham Hazelton (1867–1938)	Vol. 1. Columbia; Vol. 2. Wisconsin; Vol. 3. Columbia; Vol. 4. Wisconsin; Vol. 6. Wisconsin; Vol. 7. Columbia		Vol. 1. Allen County; Vol. 3. Allen County; Vol. 4. Allen County; Vol. 5. Allen County; Vol. 7. Allen County	
1950	New York and Queens County Railway and the Steinway Lines, 1867–1939.		Vincent Francis Seyfried (1918–2012); William Asadorian			Columbia University	
1952	The History of Little Neck	Little Neck Community Association (publisher); William James & Co. (printer)				Allen County Public Library	
1960	Indian Affairs in Colonial New York: The Seventeenth Century	Cornell University Press (1st ed.; 1960); University of Nebraska Press (1997 re-print)	Allen W. Trelease (1928–2011)	Google Books (1997 re-print) (limited preview)			
1990	A Bibliography of New York State Communities (3rd ed.) "Empire State Historical Publication Series, 51"	Ira J. Friedman, Inc. (1968) (a division of Kennikat Press owned by Cornell Jaray) (Note: Ira J. Friedman (born 18 July 1894 Manhattan), the namesake of a Long Island Publisher, was a bookseller and father-in-law of Cornell Jaray (1922–2014), head of Ira J. Friedman, Inc., of Port Washington, New York.); Heritage Books (1988); Heritage Books (1990)	Harold Robert Nestler (1921–2015)			Internet Archive. Heritage Books. 1990. ISBN 9781556133305.	LCCN 68-18353; LCCN 89-122427; LCCN 90-203751
1991	Old Queens, N.Y. – In Early Photographs	Dover Publications	Vincent Francis Seyfried (1918–2012); William Asadorian	Google Books (limited preview)			
1995	Elmhurst – From Town Seat to Mega-Suburb	Vincent Francis Seyfried (1918–2012) (publisher)	Vincent Francis Seyfried (1918–2012)			Internet Archive	
2004	Long Island City – Images of America	Arcadia Publishing	Greater Astoria Historical Society; Thomas Jackson; Richard Melnick	Google Books (2004) (limited preview) Google Books (2007) (limited preview); Google Books (2010) (limited preview)			
2006	Forgotten New York – Views of a Lost Metropolis; "Queens"	Collins	Kevin Walsh (founder of Forgotten NY)			Boston Public Library. Collins. September 26, 2006. ISBN 9780060754006.	
2007	The Rockaways – Postcard History Series	Arcadia Publishing	Emil Robert Lucev, Jr. (1933–2018)	Google Books (limited preview)			
2011	Fresh Meadows – Images of America	Arcadia Publishing	Fred Cantor; Debra Davidson	Google Books (2011) (limited preview)			
2011	Jamaica Station – Images of Rail	Arcadia Publishing	David D. Morrison	Google Books (limited preview)			
2013	Forgotten Queens – Images of America	Arcadia Publishing	Kevin Walsh (founder of Forgotten NY)	Google Books (limited preview)			
2015	Jewish Communities of the Five Towns and The Rockaways – Images of America	Arcadia Publishing		Google Books (limited preview)			
2018	法拉盛故事 (in Chinese) [Flushing Story]	I Wing Press Inc. (Xinye Qiu; Flushing)	[Paul] Xinye Qiu (born 1962)& SinoVision (Chinese: 邱辛晔, 美国中文电视)	Google Books (limited preview)			OCLC 1066256353
2018	法拉盛傳 – 新華人拓展史 (in Chinese) [Flushing – a Biography, The Rise of a New Chinese Community in the United States]	I Wing Press Inc. (Xinye Qiu; Flushing)	Wei-Nian Luo (born 1960) [Paul] Xinye Zhu Qiu (born 1962) (authors)	Google Books (limited preview)			OCLC 1136563208 (all editions)
2020	The Queens Nobody Knows – An Urban Walking Guide	Princeton University Press	William Benno Helmreich (1945–2020)	Google Books (limited preview); Google Books (limited preview)			
2021	Douglaston–Little Neck – Images of America	Arcadia Publishing	Jason D. Antos	Google Books (limited preview)			

=== Slavery in New York ===
Slavery in New York
Year	Title	Printer	Compiler(s)	Google Books	HathiTrust	Internet Archive	Other
Current	New York Slavery Records Index – Records of Enslaved Persons and Slave Holders in New York from 1525 though the Civil War	John Jay College of Criminal Justice (publisher)					John Jay College

=== Families and genealogy ===
Families and genealogy
Year	Title	Printer	Compiler(s)	Google Books	HathiTrust	Internet Archive	Other
1895	Long Island Genealogies – Families of Albertson, Andrews, Bedell, Birdsall, Bowne, Carman, Carr, Clowes, Cock, Cornelius, Covert, Dean, Doughty, Duryea, Feke, Frost, Haff, Hallock, Haydock, Hicks, Hopkins, Jackson, Jones, Keese, Ketcham, Kirby, Liones, Marvin, Merritt, Moore, Mott, Oakley, Onderdonck, Pearsall, Post, Powell, Prior, Robbins, Rodman, Rowland, Rushmore, Sands, Scudder, Seaman, Searing, Smith, Strickland, Titus, Townsend, Underhill, Valentine, Vanderdonk, Weeks, Whitman, Whitson, Willets, Williams, Willis, Wright, and Other Families – Being Kindred Descendants of Thomas Powell, of Bethpage, L.I., 1688 → re: "Last Will and Testament of Thomas Powell Sen Late of Bethpage"	Joel Munsell's Sons (publisher)	Mary Powell Bunker (née Mary Powell Seaman; 1820–1906) (compiler & editor)	Harvard	Cornell	Marygrove College	LCCN 03-13311; OCLC 841579522 (all editions)
1906	Thomas Jones – Fort Neck, Queens County, Long Island, 1695 – and His Descendants – The Floyd-Jones Family – With Connections From the Year 1066	J. Grant Senia Press (John Grant Senia; 1865–1943) (printer)	Thomas Floyd-Jones (1841–1919) (compiler & editor)		Library of Congress	Library of Congress	LCCN 31-33664; OCLC 16290471 (all editions); OCLC 21177711 (all editions)
1907	The Jones Family of Long Island – Descendants of Major Thomas Jones (1665–1726) and Allied Families	Tobias A. Wright (publisher)	John Henry Jones (1851–1905) (compiler & editor)		Library of Congress	Library of Congress	LCCN 07-29105; OCLC 14640340 (all editions)
1912	"Long Island Cemetery Inscriptions" (Vol. 4). "Dutch Reformed Church Yard, Newtown" (pp. 1–24)		Josephine C. Frost (Mrs. Samuel Knapp Frost) (née Josephine Crossette Mayou; 1864–1942)				NYPL; OCLC 39094908; LCCN 12-23351
1912	"Long Island Cemetery Inscriptions" (Vol. 4). "St. James Episcopal Church Yard at Newtown" (pp. 26–43)		Josephine C. Frost				NYPL; OCLC 39094908; LCCN 12-23351
1912	"Long Island Cemetery Inscriptions" (Vol. 4). "Presbyterian Church Yard at Newtown" (pp. 44–75)		Josephine C. Frost				NYPL; OCLC 39094908; LCCN 12-23351
1912	"Long Island Cemetery Inscriptions" (Vol. 4). "Cornell Burying Ground at Rockaway" (pp. 76–77)		Josephine C. Frost				NYPL; OCLC 39094908; LCCN 12-23351
1912	"Long Island Cemetery Inscriptions" (Vol. 4). "St. George's Episcopal Church Yard at Flushing" (pp. 78–95)		Josephine C. Frost				NYPL; OCLC 39094908; LCCN 12-23351
1914	Genealogical and Family History of Southern New York and the Hudson River Valley – A Record of the Achievements of Her People in the Making of a Commonwealth and the Building of a Nation	Lewis Historical Publishing Company (publisher)	Cuyler Reynolds (1866–1934) (compiler & editor) (brother of Marcus T. Reynolds)	Vol. 3 – Harvard		Vol. 3 – Library of Congress	
1919	Genealogies of Long Island Families – a collection of genealogies relating to the following Long Island families: Dickerson, Mitchill, Wickham, Carman, Raynor, Rushmore, Satterly, Hawkins, Arthur Smith, Mills, Howard, Lush, Greene	Charles J. Werner (publisher)	Charles Jolly Werner (1887–1951); Benjamin Franklin Thompson (1784–1849) (compilers)	Wisconsin Historical Society	Wisconsin Historical Society; Cornell University; Library of Congress	Library of Congress; Cornell University; Allen County Public Library	
1934	Early Settlers of New York State – Their Ancestors and Descendants (monthly magazine) (Vol. 4; No. 1. July 1934	Thomas James Foley (1893–1949) (publisher)	Janet Wethy Foley (née Lutie L. Wethy; 1887–1962) (wife of publisher)	Heritage Books (limited preview)		Allen County Public Library	
1935	Catalogue of American Genealogies in the Library of the Long Island Historical Society	Long Island Historical Society (now the Center for Brooklyn History) (publisher)	Emma Toedteberg (1857–1936) (directing editor)		University of Michigan		LCCN 36-10110; OCLC 3031719 (all editions)
1939	Colonial Families of Long Island and Connecticut – Being the Ancestry and Kindred of Herbert Seversmith (Vol. 2; "Bushnell to Fordham")		Herbert Furman Seversmith, PhD, F.A.S.G. (1904–1967); Kenn Stryker–Rodda, Litt.D., F.A.S.G. (1903–1990)			Boston Public Library. 1939.	
1948	Bowne Family of Flushing, Long Island	William Byrd Press, Inc. (printer)	Edith King Wilson (née Edith R. King; 1876–1967) (compiler)		Wisconsin Historical Society	Boston Public Library	
1962	Long Island Genealogical Source Material	National Genealogical Society (publisher)	Herbert Furman Seversmith, PhD (1904–1967) (compiler)			Allen County Public Library	
1987	Long Island Source Records – From the New York Genealogical and Biographical Record	Clearfield Company, Inc. (2001 re-print)	Henry B. Hoff, J.D., FASG, Fellow, GBS (born 1946) (compiler)	Google Books (2001 re-print) (limited preview)			Archive.org.

=== Real estate ===
Real estate
Year	Title	Printer	Compiler(s)	Google Books	HathiTrust	Internet Archive	Other
1919	Real Estate Record and Builders Guide (Vol. 104, no. 4, whole no. 2680; July 26, 1919). "Predicts Population of 3,000,000 for Queens Borough – Greatest Building Development of Homes, Industrial Buildings and Stores Ever Known in the City, Says Walter I. Willis."	The Record and Guide Company; Franklin T. Miller, President (publisher)		University of Illinois			
1923	Mortgage Investments in Queens	Chamber of Commerce of the Borough of Queens (publisher)	Walter Irving Willis (1882–1937) (compiler & editor)	Columbia University			

=== State directories that include Queens ===
State directories that include Queens
Year	Title	Printer	Compiler(s)	Google Books	HathiTrust	Internet Archive	Other
1850	The New York Mercantile Union Business Directory, Containing a New Map of New York City and State, and a Business Directory, Showing the Name, Location and Business of Mercantile Firms, Manufacturing Establishments, Professional Men, Artists, Corporations, Banking, Moneyed and Literary Institutions, Courts, Public Officers, and All the Various Miscellaneous Departments, Which Contribute to the Business, Wealth and Prosperity of the State to Which Is Appended, a Short Advertising Register Many of the Principal Mercantile Houses and Manufacturing Establishments of New York and Other Cities. Carefully Collected and Arranged for 1850–51. To Be Revised and Continued	S.W. Benedict (Seth Williston Benedict; 1803–1869) (stereotyper & printer)	Samuel French, L. C. & H. L. Pratt, 293 Broadway (New York); J. B. Henshaw, 161 William Street (New York); J. C. Jones (Albany); Geo. M. Howell (Binghamton)	Harvard; Stanford	Columbia	Harvard; Columbia	
1912	First Annual Industrial Directory of New York State, 1912	John Williams (1865–1944) (Commissioner of Labor); New York State Department of Labor (publisher)	John Williams (compiler)	UC Berkeley; Michigan; Stanford			

- Pratt in Doggett's 1845 directory: Pratt & Co., daguerreotypes, 293 Broadway

=== National directories that include Queens ===
National directories that include Queens
Year	Title	Printer	Compiler(s)	Google Books	HathiTrust	Internet Archive	Other
1878	Sadliers' Catholic Directory, Almanac and Ordo – For the Year of our Lord 1878: With a Full Report of the Various Dioceses in the United States, British America, Ireland, and Australia; "Diocese of Brooklyn"; pp. 187–193	B. & J. Sadlier & Co. (publisher)		Penn State			

== Map gallery ==
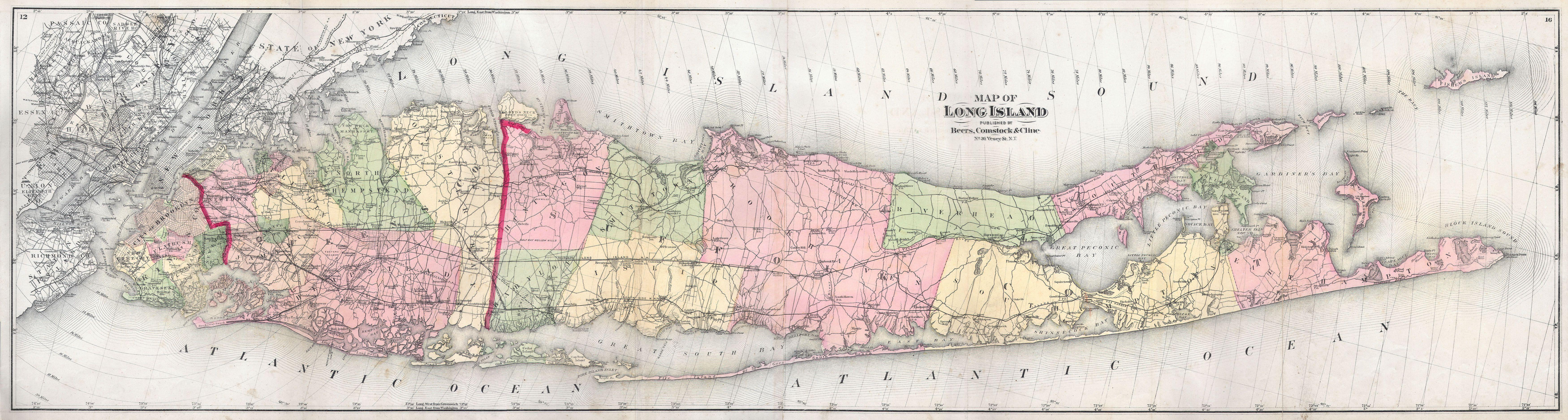
(1873)
1859 Map of Kings and Queens Counties, pre-consolidation, when the City of Brooklyn had already annexed Williamsburg and Bushwick, and Long Island City had not yet incorporated
Maps of Queens neighborhoods, villages, and towns

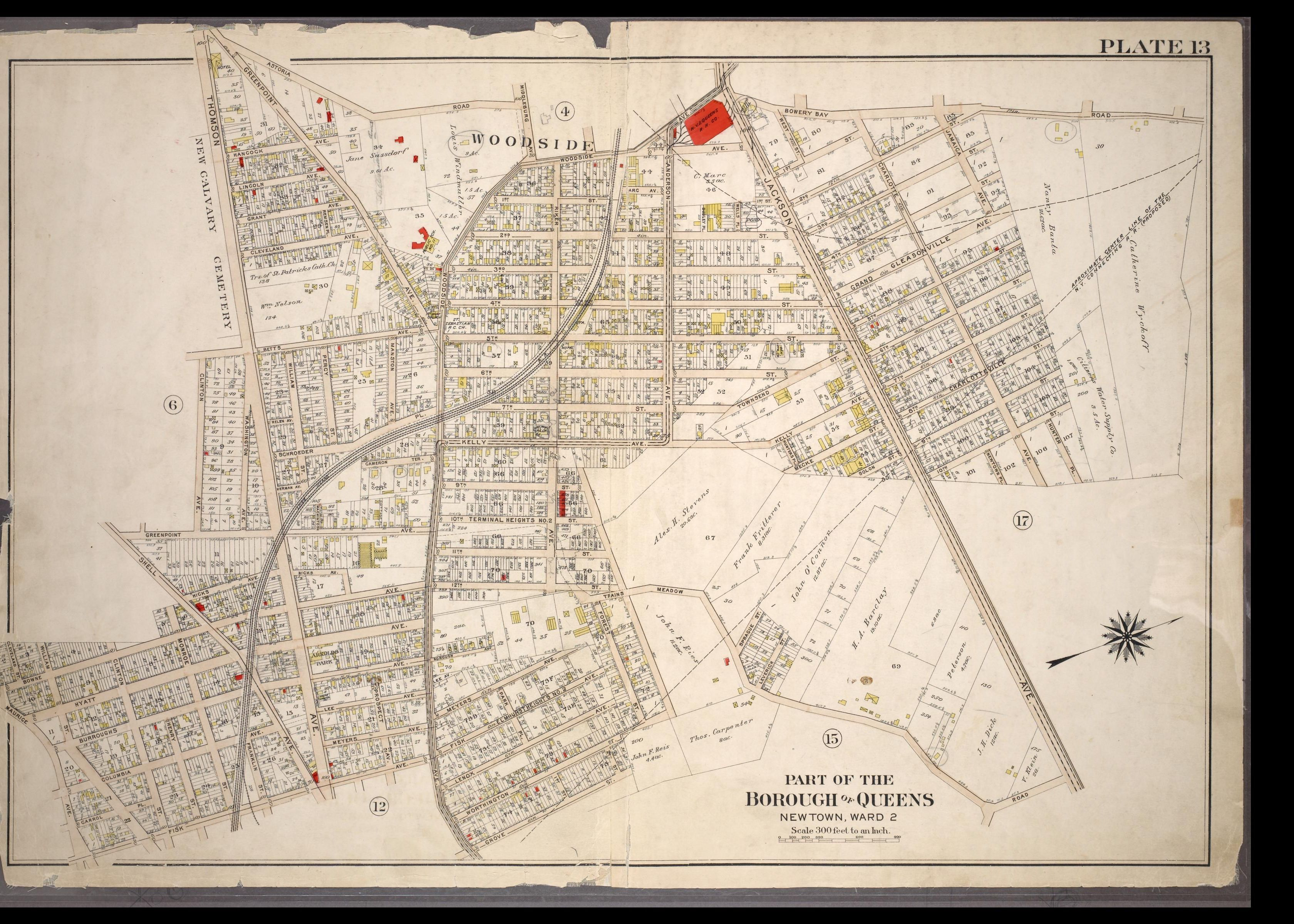
Borough of Queens
(1909)

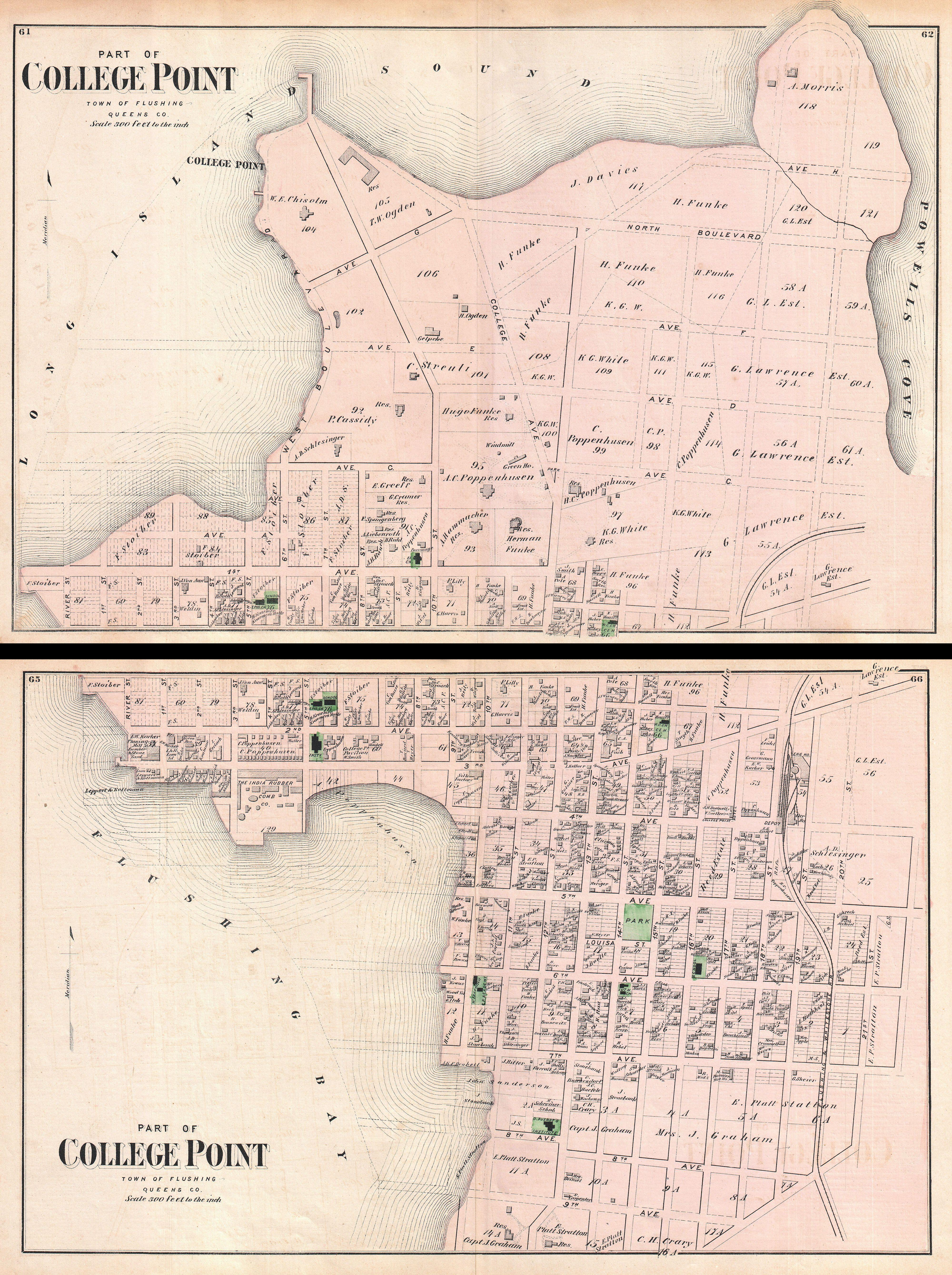
College Point, Queens
(1873)

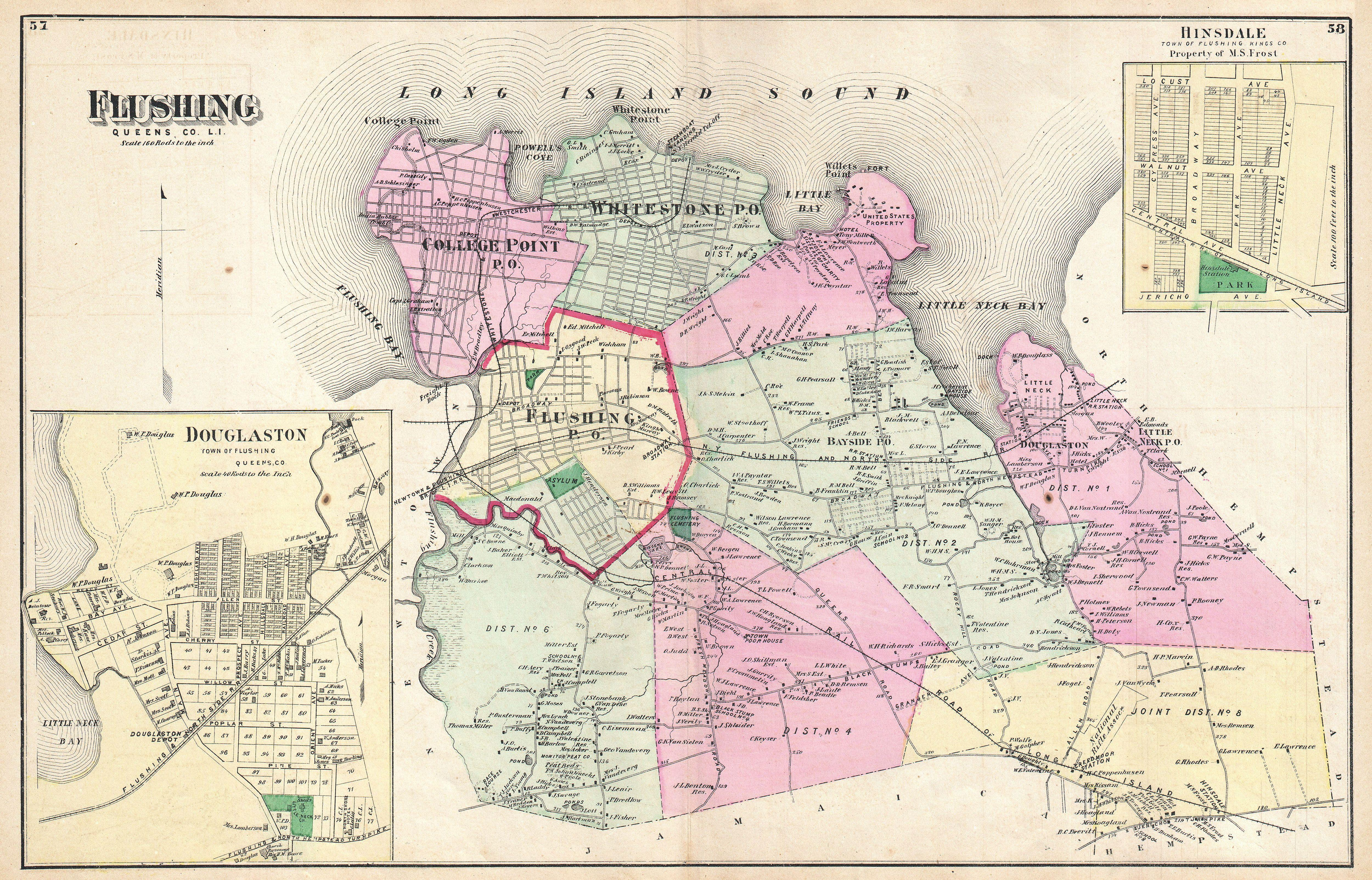
Flushing, College Point, Whitestone, Bayside, Douglaston–Little Neck
(1873)

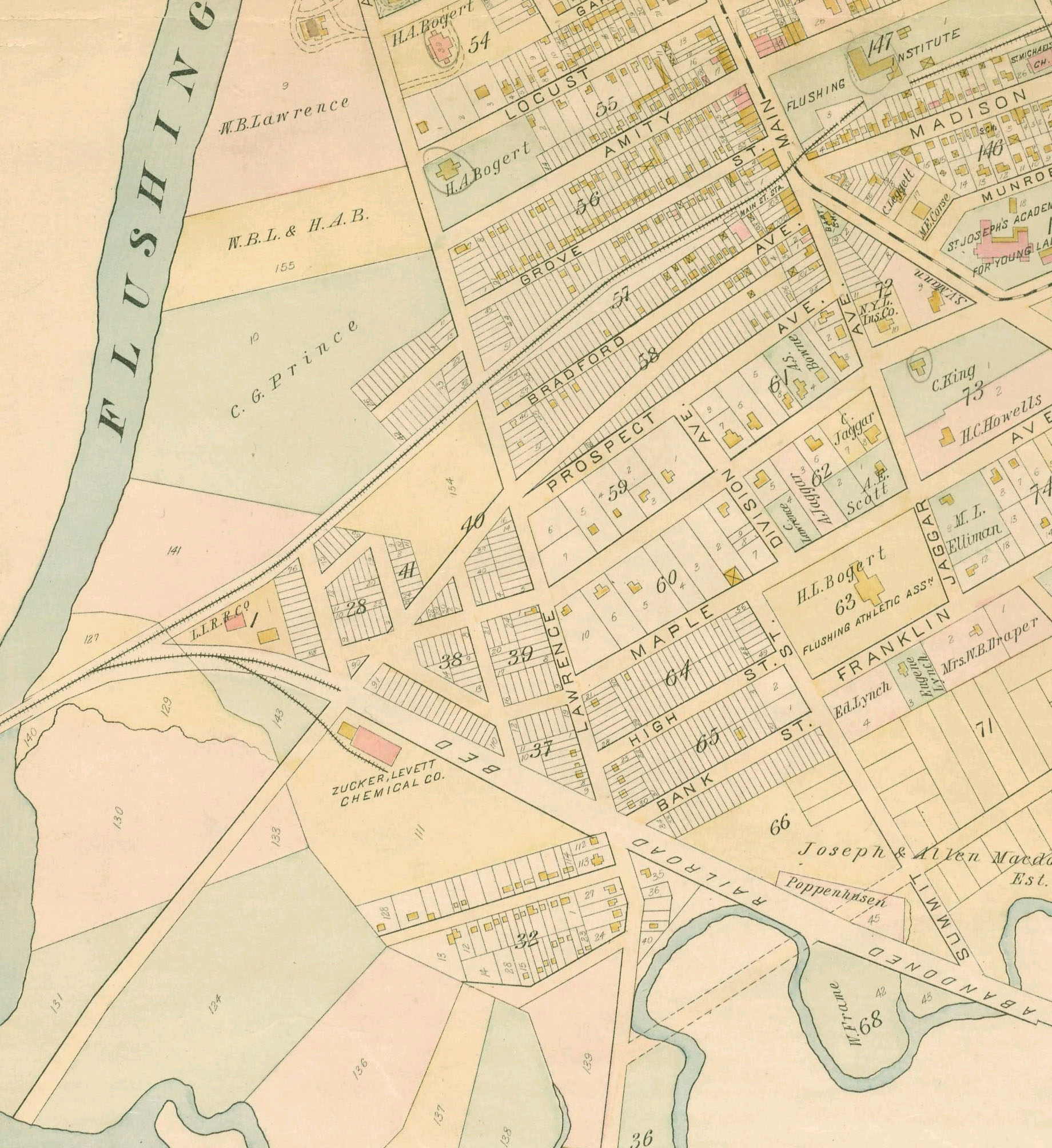
Flushing
(1891)

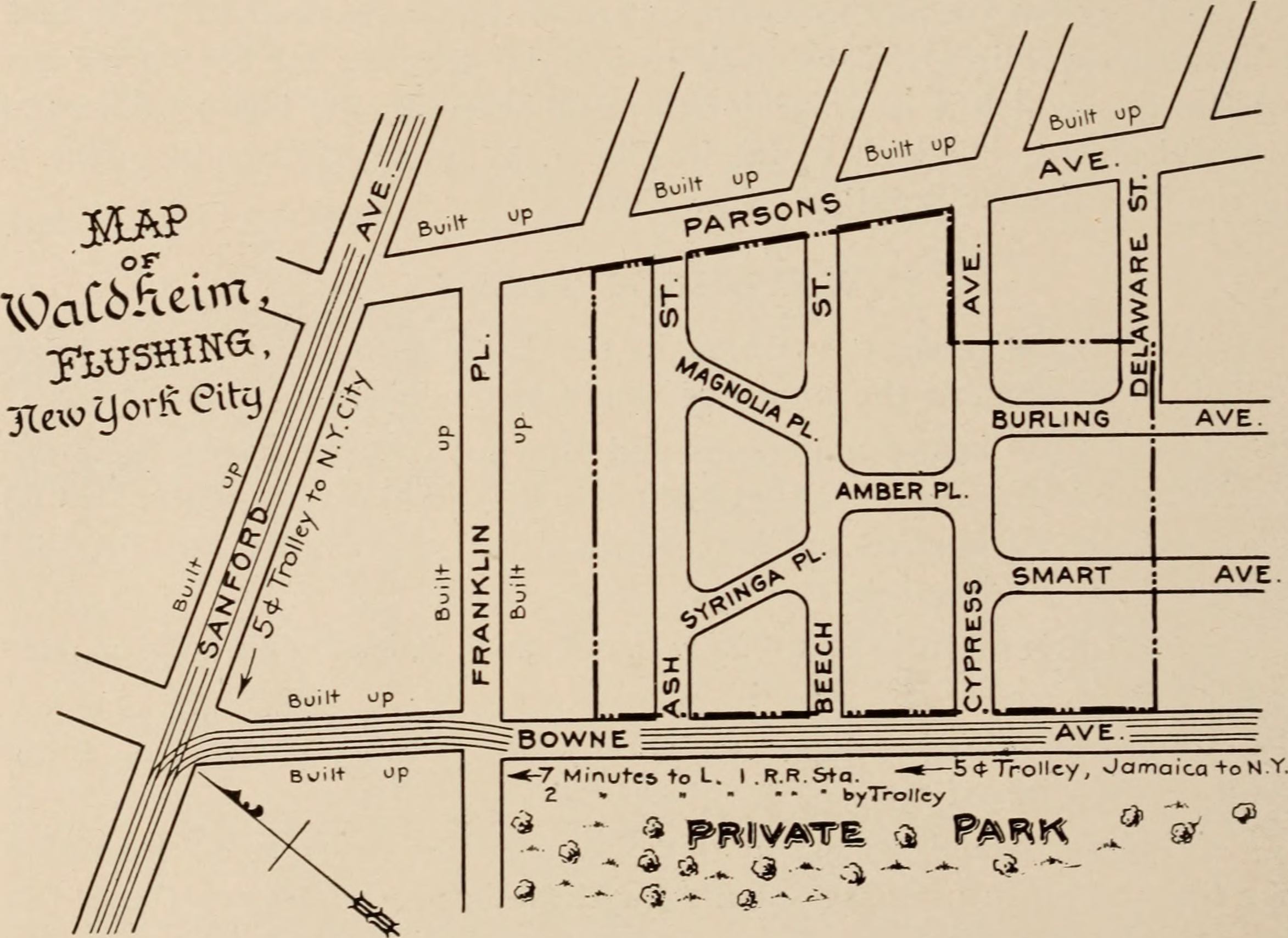
Waldheim
(1917)

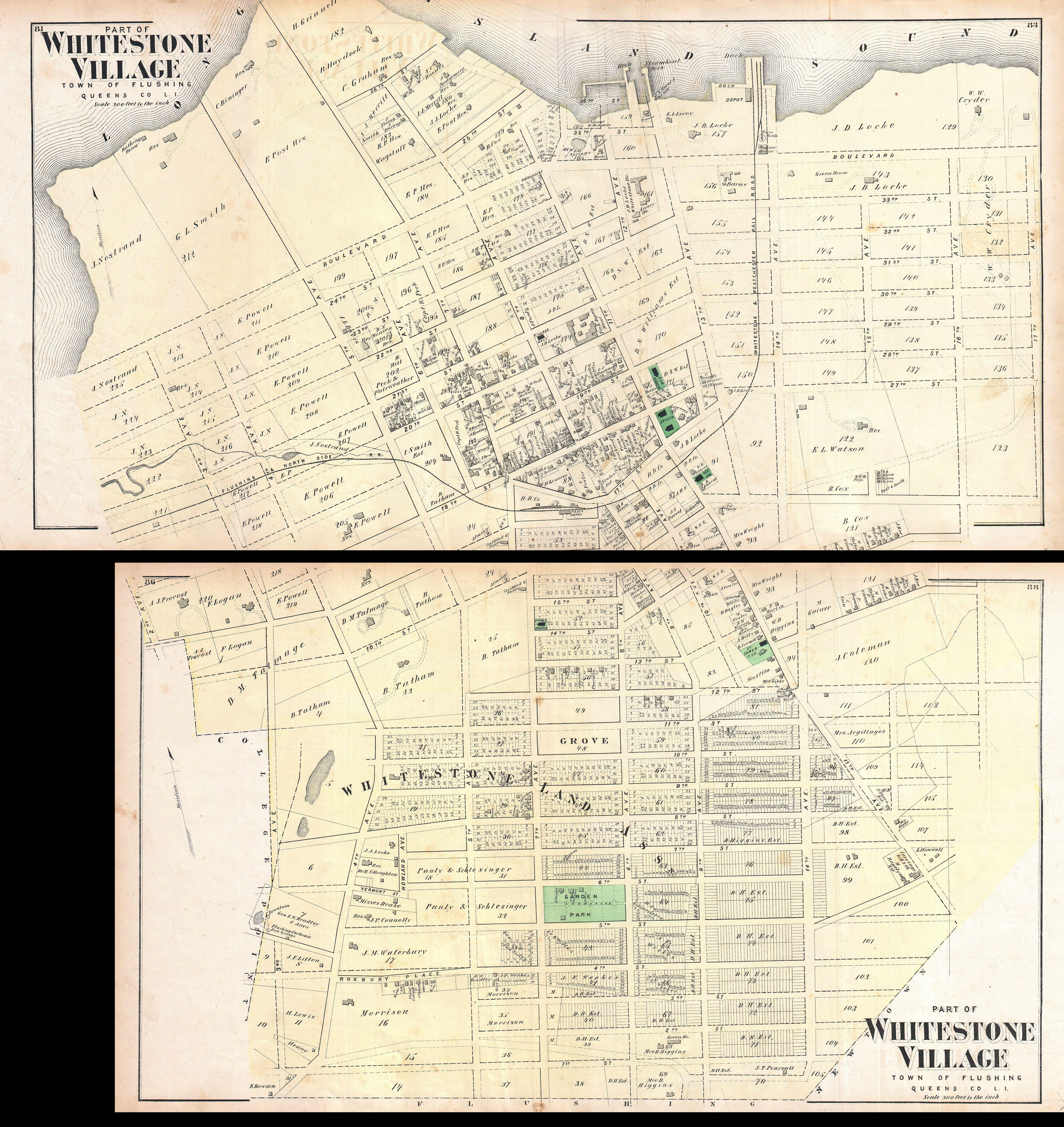
Whitestone Village
(1873)

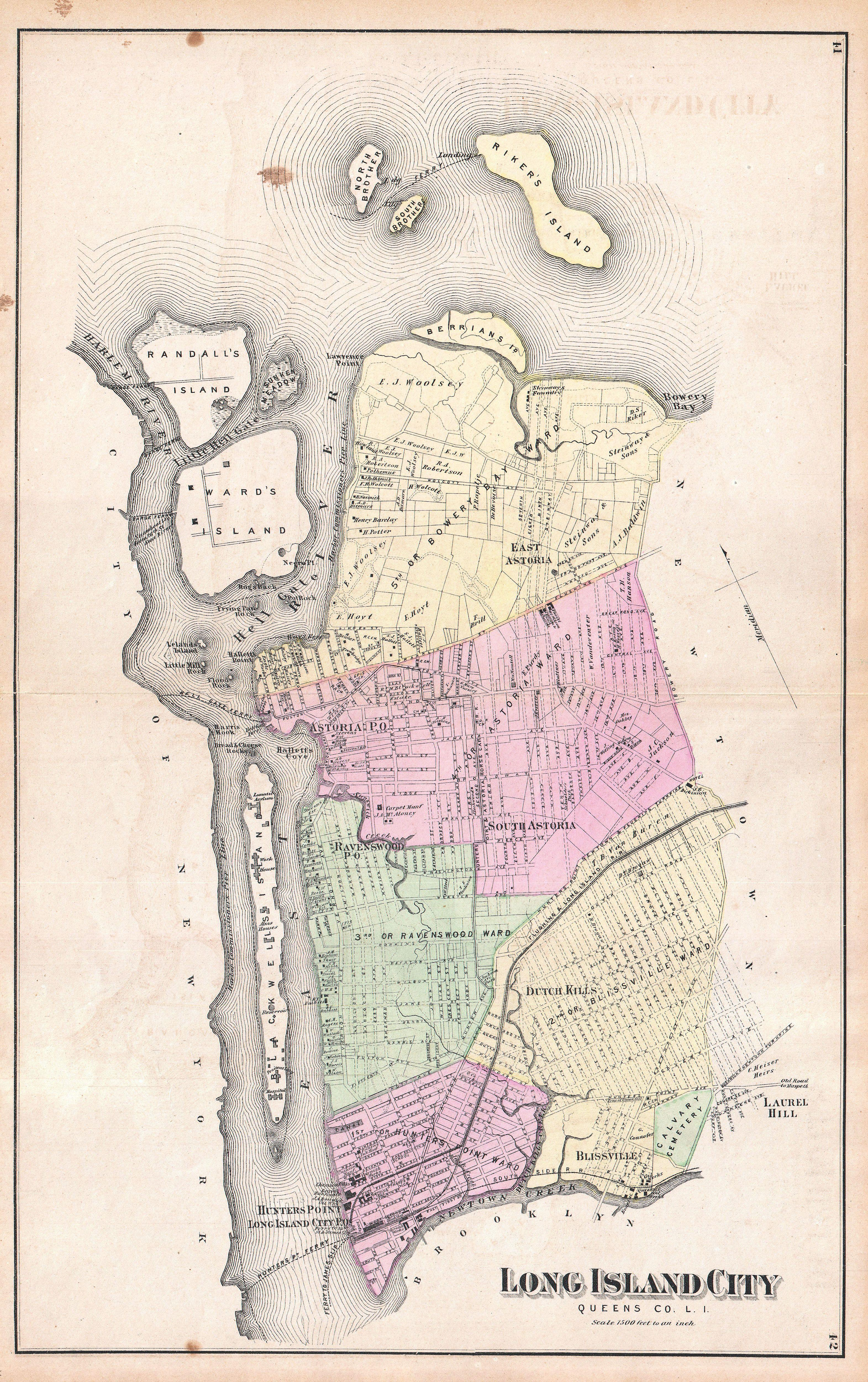
Astoria and Long Island City
(1873)

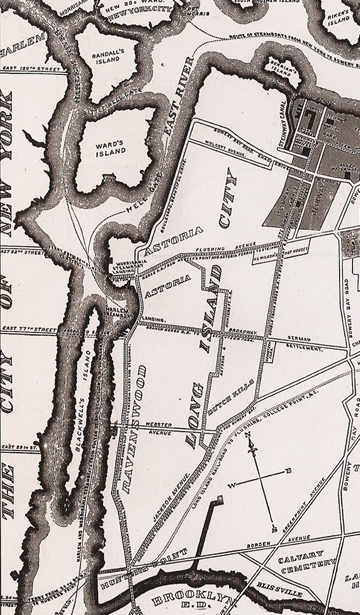
Long Island City
(1896)

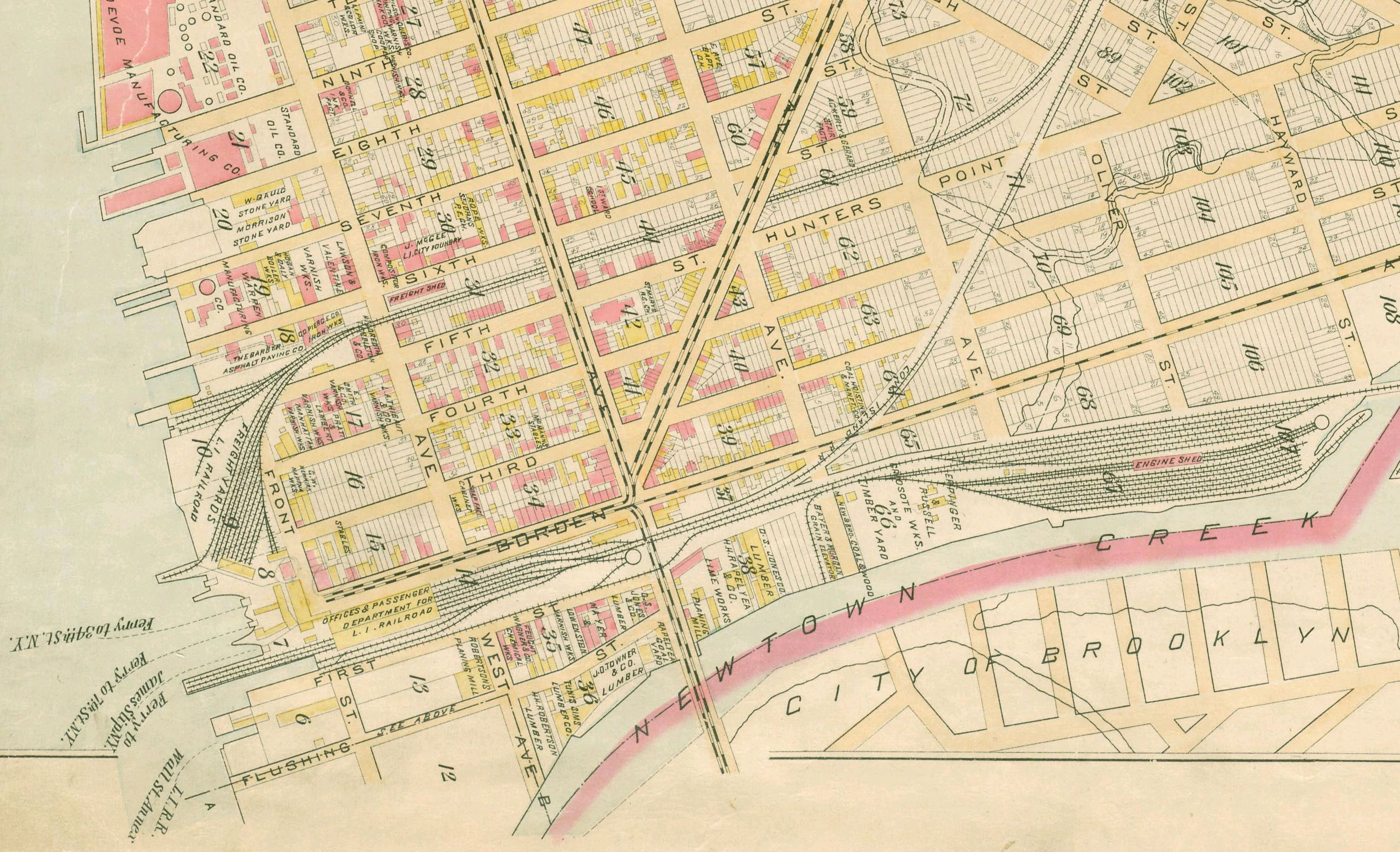
Hunters Point
(1891)

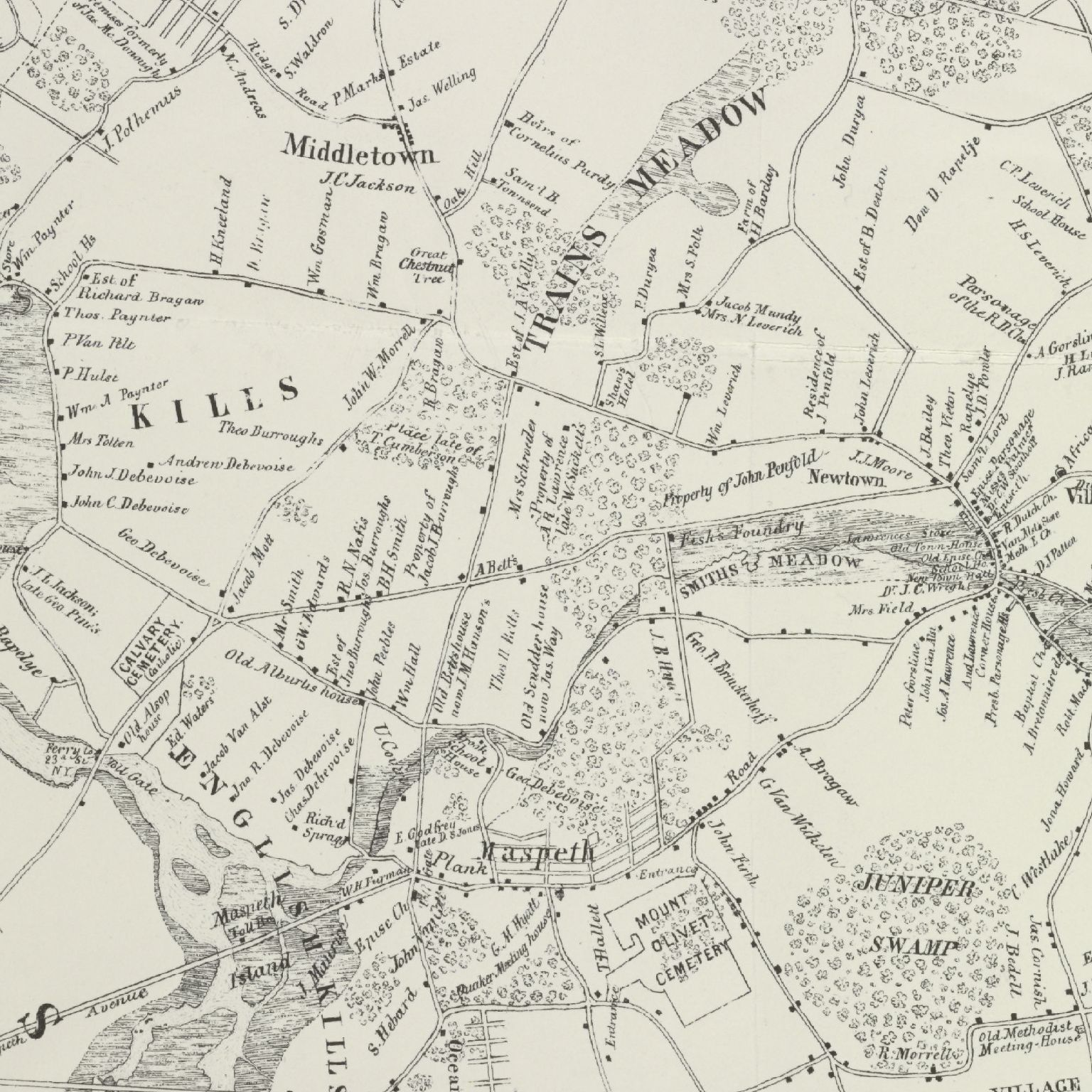
Newtown
(Elmhurst)
(1852)

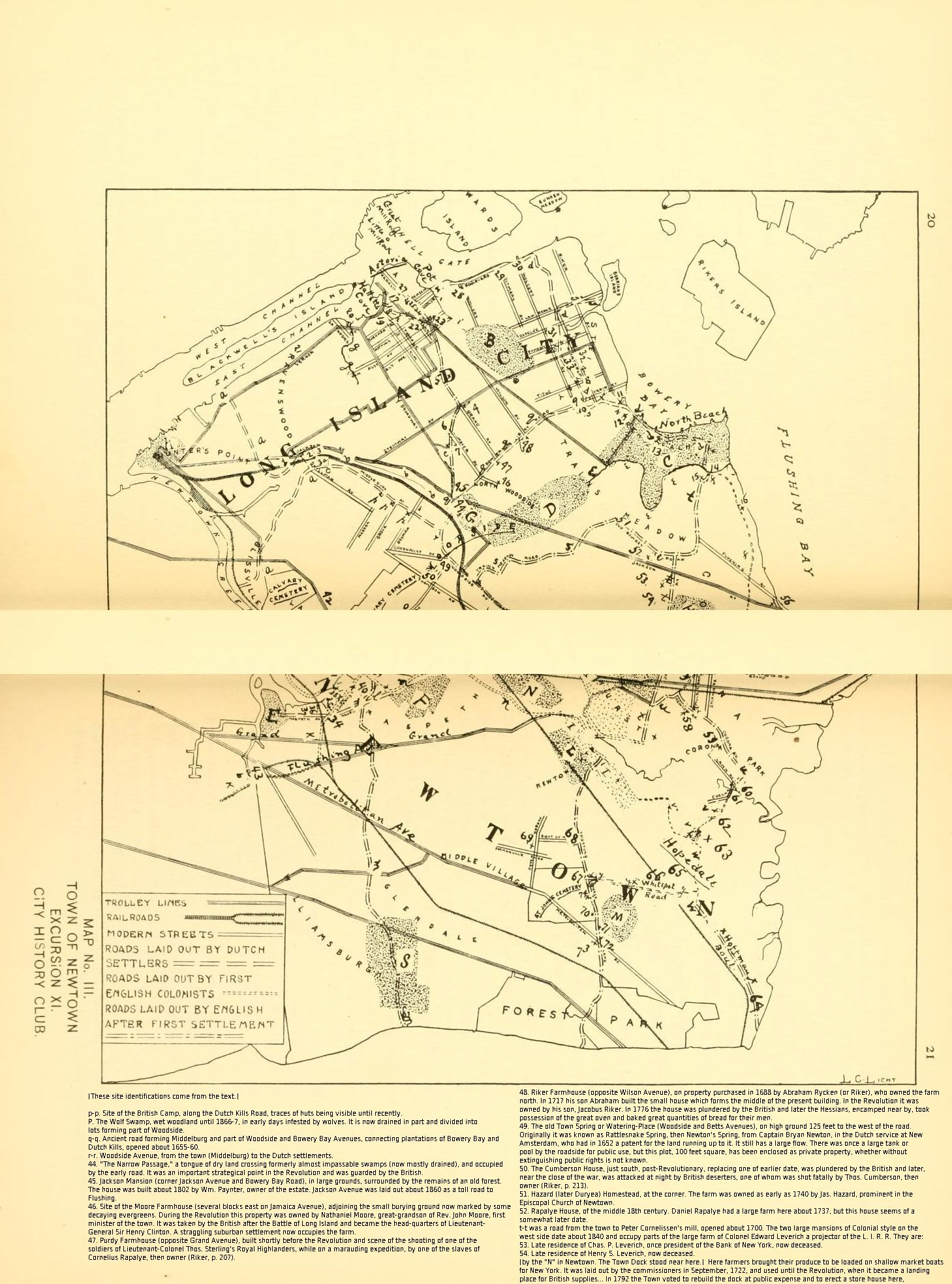
Newtown
(Elmhurst)
(1908)

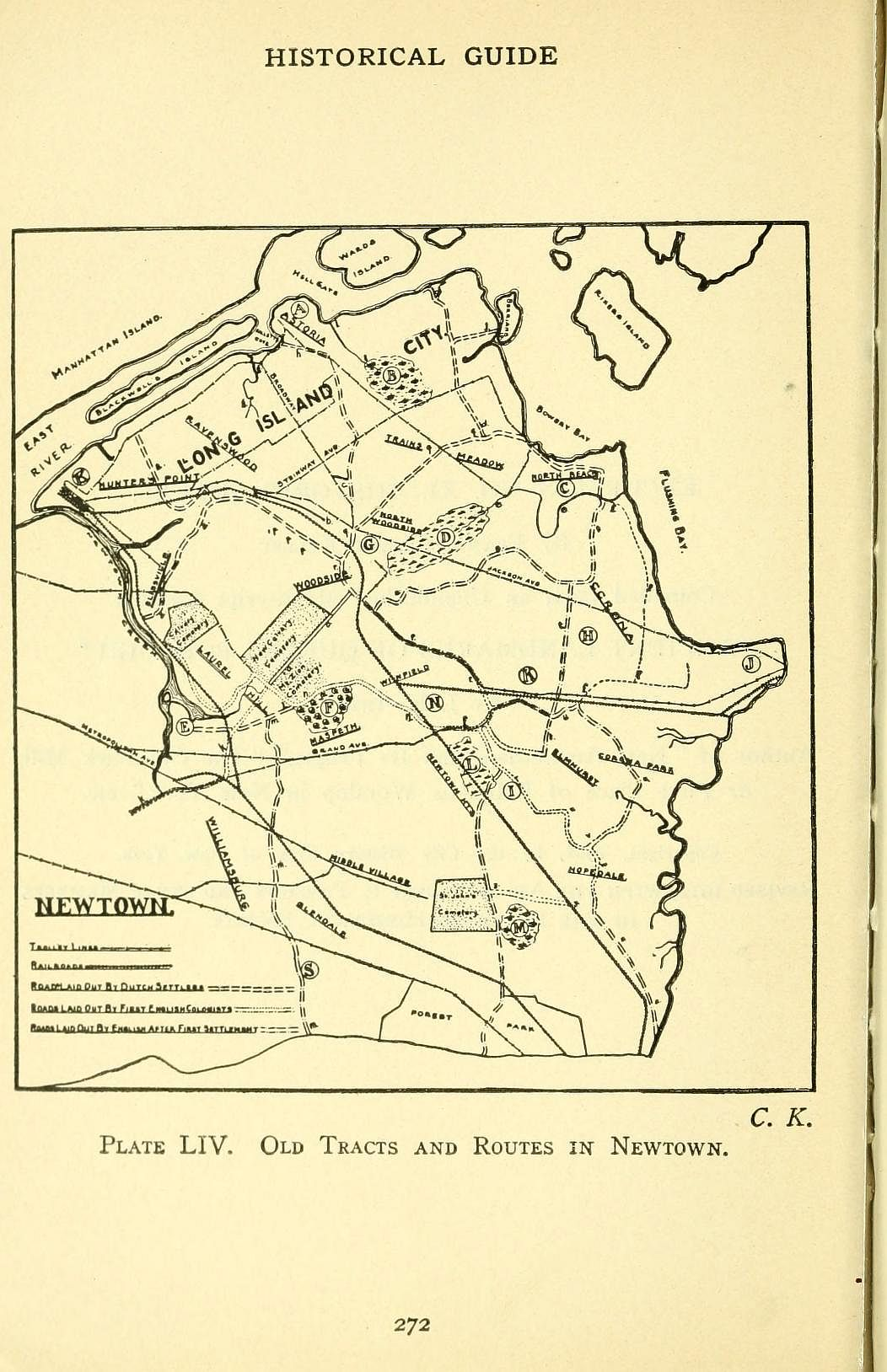
Newtown
(Elmhurst
(1910)

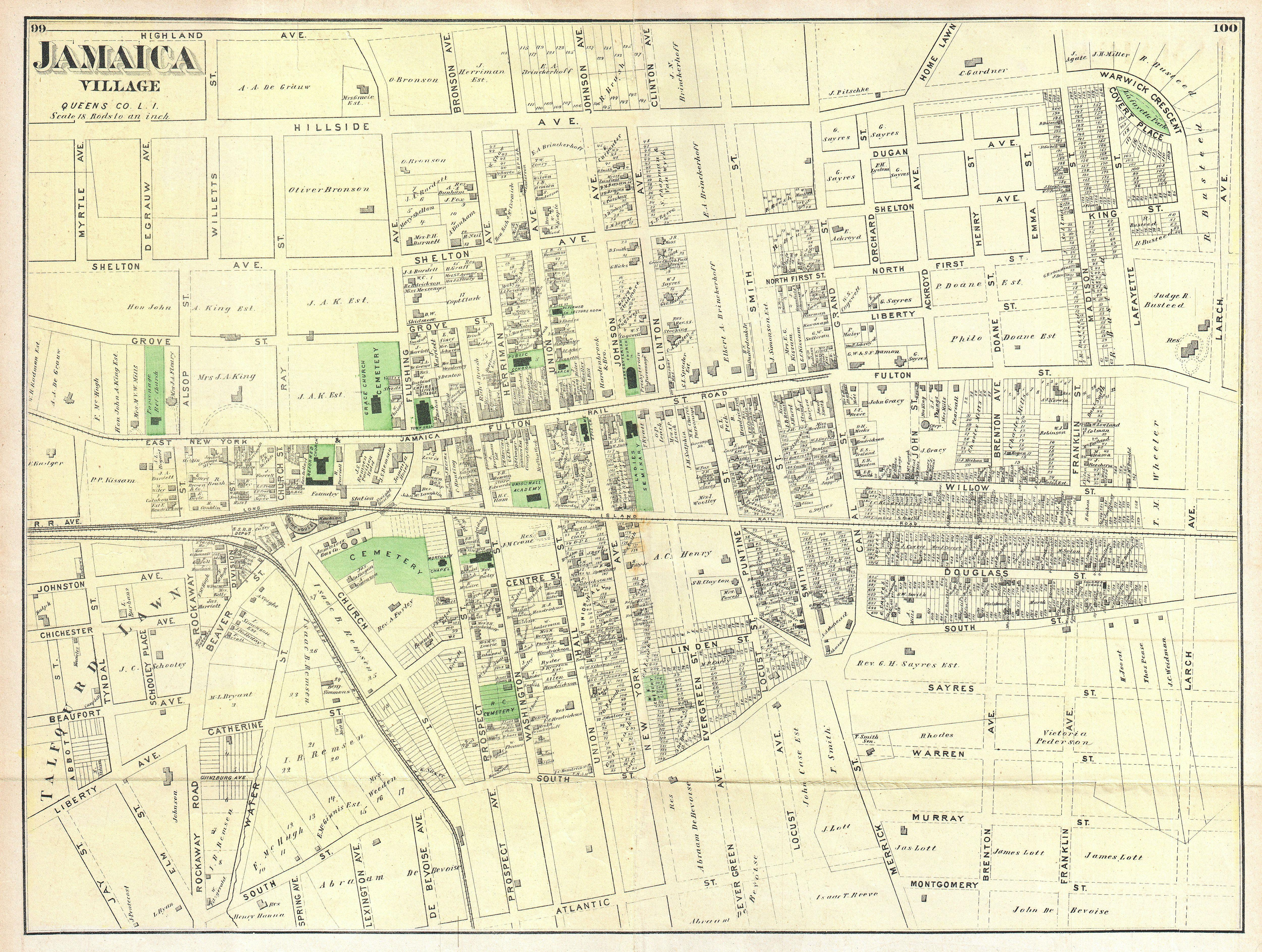
Jamaica Village
(1873)

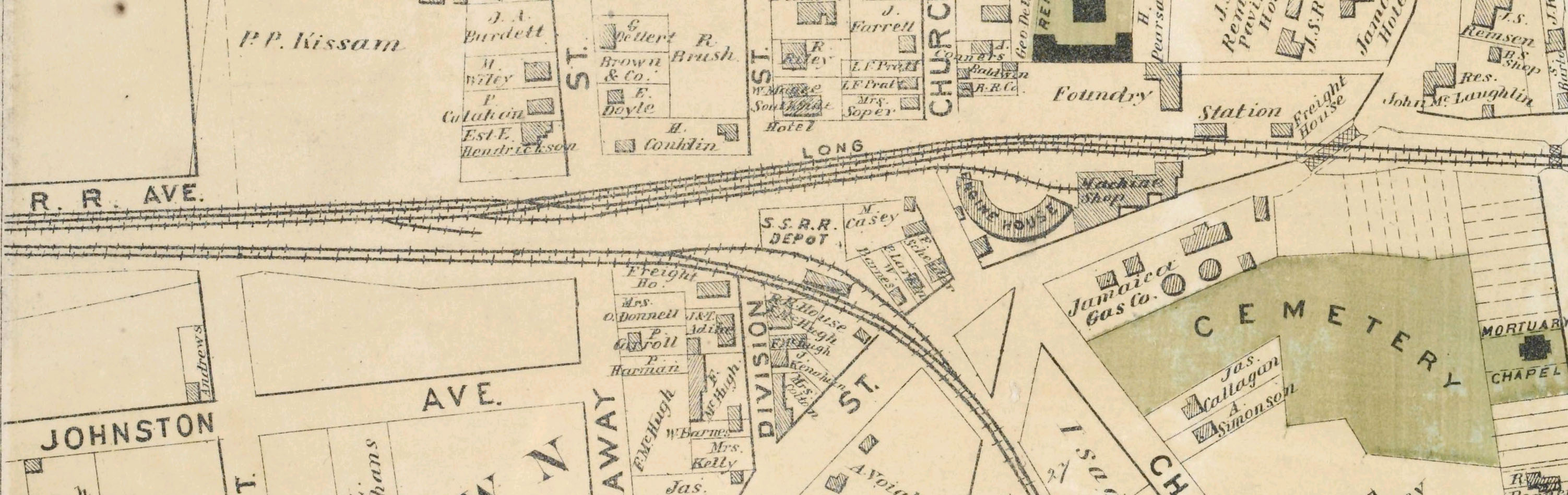
Jamaica railroad stations
(1873)

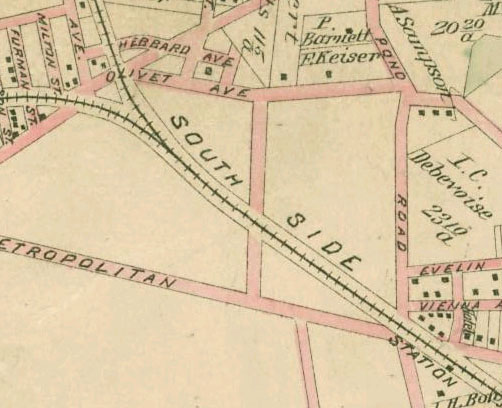
Fresh Pond
(1891)

JFK Airport
(2016)

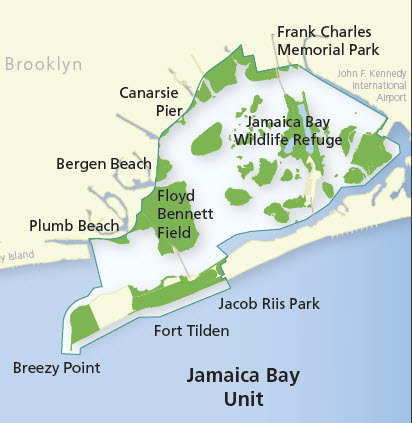
Jamaica Bay Wildlife Refuge
(2010)

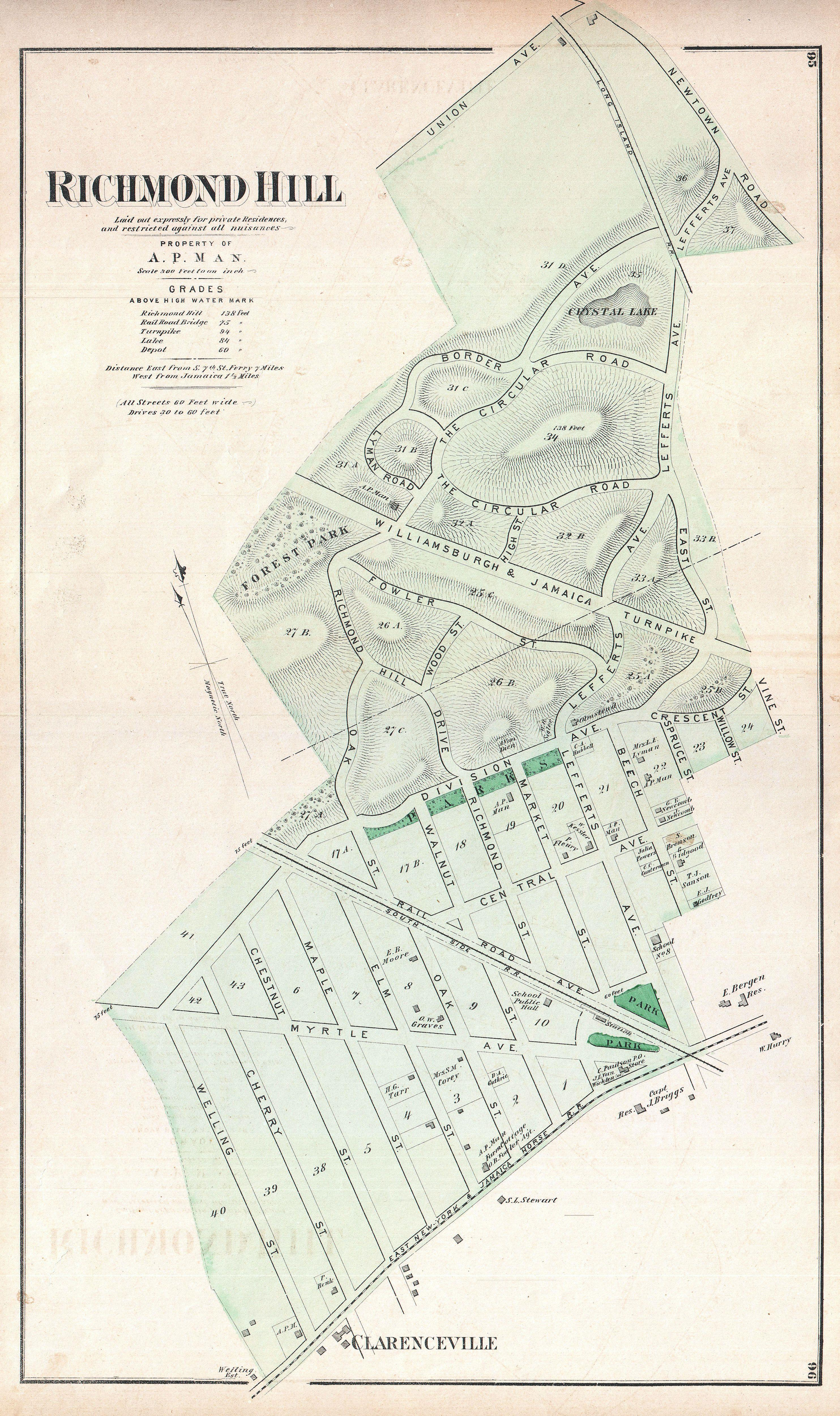
Richmond Hill
(1873)

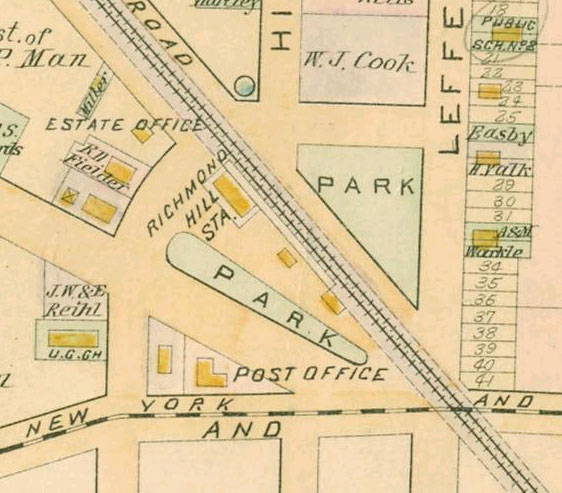
Richmond Hill Station
(1891)

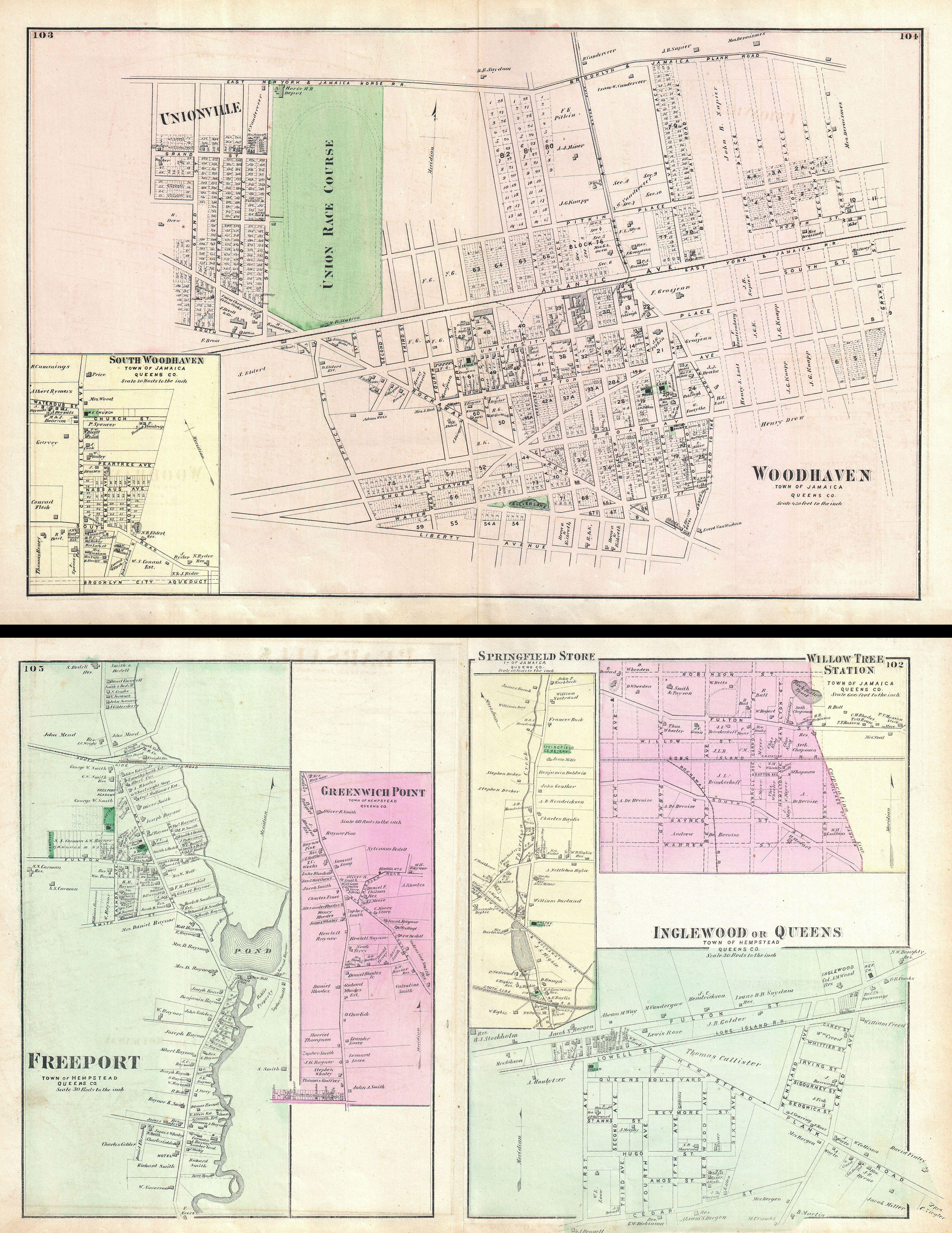
Woodhaven
(1873)

Edgemere
(1907)

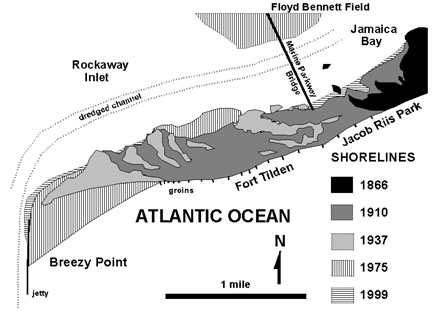
Breezy Point
(n.d.)

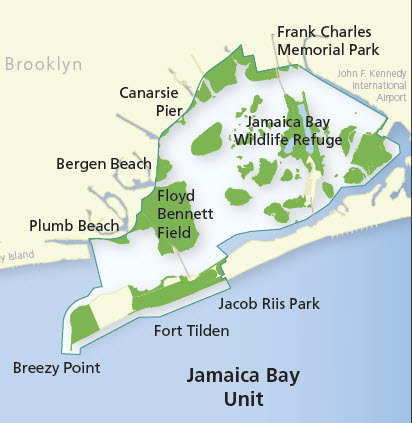
Jamaica Bay Unit
(2010)

== Neighborhoods, neighborhood microcosms – including selected ethnic enclaves ==
Because neighborhoods are unincorporated communities, the boundaries and gradations of recognizability vary.

Northwestern Queens
1. Astoria
  1. Astoria Heights
  2. Ditmars
    1. Steinway
  3. Little Egypt
  4. Norwood Gardens
  5. Ravenswood
2. Jackson Heights
  1. Jackson Heights Historic District
  2. Jackson Heights Business District
3. Long Island City
  1. Blissville
  2. Hunters Point
    1. MoMA PS1
    2. Gantry Plaza State Park
  3. Dutch Kills
  4. Queensbridge
  5. Queensview
  6. Queens West
    1. Hunter's Point South
  7. Queens Plaza
    1. Queens Plaza Park
4. Sunnyside
  1. Sunnyside Gardens
    1. Phipps Gardens
  2. Sunnyside Yard
Northeastern Queens
5. Bayside
  1. Bayside Gables
  2. Bay Terrace
  3. Bayside Hills
  4. Fort Totten
  5. Oakland Gardens
  6. Lawrence Cemetery
6. Bellerose
7. College Point
8. Douglaston–Little Neck
  1. Douglaston
    1. Douglas Bay
    2. Douglas Manor
    3. Douglaston Hill
    4. Douglaston Park
    5. Winchester Estates
    6. Douglaston Historic District
    7. Douglaston Hill Historic District
  2. Little Neck
    1. Pines
    2. Little Neck Hills
    3. Westmorland
9. Flushing
  1. Flushing Chinatown
  2. Auburndale
  3. Broadway-Flushing (formerly known as Little Taipei, Little Taiwan, and Mandarin Town)
    1. Bowne Park
  4. Chinatown
  5. Downtown Flushing
  6. Kew Gardens Hills
  7. Linden Hill
  8. Murray Hill (aka East Flushing)
    1. Koreatown
    2. Kissena Corridor Park (on the south border of Murray Hill)
  9. Willets Point (aka The Iron Triangle)
10. Flushing Meadows–Corona Park
  1. Shea Stadium
  2. Citi Field
  3. 1939 New York World's Fair
  4. USTA Billie Jean King National Tennis Center
  5. 1964 New York World's Fair
  6. New York Hall of Science
  7. Flushing Meadows Natatorium
  8. Corona Ash Dumps (1920s)
11. Pomonok
  1. Electchester
  2. Queensboro Hill
12. Floral Park, Queens
13. Fresh Meadows
  1. Hillcrest
  2. Utopia
14. Glen Oaks
  1. North Shore Towers
  2. Queens County Farm Museum
15. Whitestone
  1. Beechhurst
  2. Clearview
  3. Malba
Central Queens
16. Briarwood
17. Corona
  1. LeFrak City
  2. North Corona
  3. Willets Point
18. East Elmhurst
  1. Lent Homestead and Cemetery
  2. LaGuardia Airport
19. Elmhurst
  1. Chinese enclave
  2. Elmhurst Park
20. Forest Hills
  1. Forest Hills Gardens (housing development)
    1. West Side Tennis Club
  2. Forest Hills Co-op
21. Glendale
22. Kew Gardens
  1. Kew Bolmer
23. Maspeth
  1. Mount Olivet Cemetery
24. Middle Village
  1. Juniper Park
    1. Juniper Valley Park
  2. Remsen Cemetery
25. Rego Park
26. Ridgewood
  1. Wyckoff Heights
  2. Fresh Pond
  3. Fresh Pond–Traffic Historic District
27. Woodside
  1. Little Manila
  2. Boulevard Gardens
  3. Moore-Jackson Cemetery
Southeastern Queens
28. Brookville (aka Springfield Gardens)
29. Cambria Heights
30. Hollis
  1. Holliswood
31. Jamaica
  1. Jamaica Estates
  2. Jamaica Hills
  3. Rochdale Village
  4. John F. Kennedy International Airport
  5. Prospect Cemetery
32. Laurelton
33. Meadowmere
34. Queens Village
  1. Bellaire
  2. Hollis Hills
35. Rosedale
  1. Warnerville
36. St. Albans
37. South Jamaica
  1. Baislely Park
  2. South Jamaica Houses
Southwestern Queens
38. The Hole
39. Howard Beach
  1. Hamilton Beach
  2. Howard Park
  3. Lindenwood
  4. Old Howard Beach
  5. Ramblersville
  6. Rockwood Park
  7. Jamaica Bay Wildlife Refuge (south of Howard Beach)
40. Ozone Park
  1. Centreville
  2. South Ozone Park
    1. Aqueduct Racetrack
  3. Tudor Village
41. Richmond Hill
  1. Little Pubjab
42. Woodhaven
The Rockaways
43. Rockaway Peninsula
  1. Far Rockaway
  2. Wavecrest
  3. Bayswater
  4. Edgemere
    1. Edgemere Landfill
  5. Arverne
  6. Somerville
  7. Hammels
  8. Rockaway Beach
  9. Seaside
  10. Rockaway Park
  11. Belle Harbor
  12. Neponsit
  13. Breezy Point
  14. Roxbury
  15. Broad Channel (adjacent to the Rockaways)

== Bygone Queens communities, community names, and pieces of land ==
Northwestern Queens
1. Astoria
  1. Astoria Village ★ (Astoria, Queens § Early settlement)
  2. Hallet's Cove ★ (also spelled Hallett's Cove) (Astoria, Queens § Early settlement)
  3. Steinway Village ★
2. Jackson Heights
  1. Trainsmeadow (Trains Meadow) ★
3. Long Island City
  1. Arleigh Gardens ★
  2. Norwood Gardens ★
  3. The German Settlement ★ (beginning 1870s)
Northeastern Queens
4. College Point
  1. Tew's Neck ★
  2. Lawrence's Neck ★
  3. Flammersburg ★
  4. Strattonport ★
5. Flushing
  1. Waldheim ★
  2. Hinsdale ★
  3. Flushing Highlands neighborhoods
    1. Bowne Park ★
    2. Ingleside ★
    3. Flushing Park ★
6. Whitestone
  1. Beechhurst
    1. Trow Settlement ★
Central Queens
8. Elmhurst (Newtown)
  1. Middelburgh ★ (1652–1664)
  2. New Towne ★ (1665–1896)
  3. Steinway ★ (hamlet) (merged in 1870 with Long Island City)
  4. Bowery Bay ★ (hamlet) (merged in 1870 with Long Island City)
  5. Middleton ★ (hamlet) (merged in 1870 with Long Island City)
  6. Mussel Island ★
9. West Maspeth
  1. Melvina ★ (hamlet)
10. Laurel Hill / West Maspeth
  1. Berlinville ★ (established 1870s)
11. Woodside
  1. Winfield ★
12. Ridgewood
  1. Linden Hill ★
13. Middle Village
  1. Whitepot ★
Southeastern Queens
14. Hollis
  1. Holliswood
    1. Terrace Heights ★
15. Jamaica
  1. Springfield ★
16. Queens Village
  1. Creedmoor ★
Southwestern Queens
17. Howard Beach
  1. Ramblersville ★ (1916 became Howard Beach)
The Rockaways
18. Rockaway, Queens
  1. Somerville ★ (now called Arverne)
19. Far Rockaway
  1. Wave Crest ★

––––––––––––––––––––

- The Village of Creedmoor (now part of Queens Village and Glen Oaks), was, essentially, an elaborate, internationally acclaimed rifle range that was, before 1872, part of a farm owned and operated by Bernardus Hendrickson Creed (1811–1889). In July 1872, the State of New York, on behalf of the National Rifle Association of America (NRA), for $26,250 (equivalent to $705,469 in 2025), purchased 70 acres of level land from Creed, and, on June 21, 1873, opened an outdoor firing range with assistance of (i) the U.S. War Department (Army Corps of Engineers), (ii) the State of New York under the auspices of the New York Army National Guard, and (iii) the City of New York. Its name was selected by newspaper man, Col. Henry G. Shaw (né Henry Glenville Shaw; 1843–1907). He initially named it Creed's Moor, a geographical reference, and the name eventually became Creedmoor Rifle Range. The Central Railroad of Long Island – on a line that ran from Long Island City to Bethpage – opened its Creedmoor branch January 8, 1873. Creedmoor's international match, first held in 1874, was the forerunner of the Palma trophy competition. In 1892, as a result of declining public interest and mounting noise complaints from the growing neighborhood, the NRA deeded its land back to the state. In 1908, the State Legislature dedicated the land for use by the Long Island State Hospital. In 1912, the property became the Farm Colony of Brooklyn State Hospital, which eventually became the Creedmoor Psychiatric Center, located south of the interchange of Grand Central and the Cross Island Parkways. (see Google Map aerial view of the Creedmoor Psychiatric Center) After 1960, parts of the property – the Cornell Farmhouse or the Creedmoor Farmhouse Complex or the Jacob Adriance Farmhouse – became part of the Queens County Farm Museum. (see Google Map aerial view of Queens County Farm)
- Mussel Island – no occupants ever – was a small and marshy piece of land at the junction of Maspeth Creek and Newtown Creek. (Google Map aerial view the location of the former Mussel Island, at the confluence of Newtown and Maspeth Creeks)

== Selected Queens directories not found online ==
- Boyd, William Andrew (1865). Boyd's Directory of Astoria, East New York, Flatbush, Flushing, Glen Cove, Greenport, Hempstead, Huntington, Jamaica, Newtown, Patchogue, Port Jefferson, Riverhead, Sag Harbor, and Setauket, Long Island – With a Business Directory of Patrons to the Work – And An Appendix of Much General Information, 1864–5. William Andrew Boyd (1850–1818) (publisher) → J.F. Morris & Co. (Joseph F. Morris; born Nov 1853 Rhode Island) (printer). LCCN 18-16812; OCLC 475459351 (all editions).
1. Fagan, Patricia Eileen. Transcribed and posted online. See Fagan's website → "City Directories for Queens"
2. Accessible via Family History Center – FHC 1930448.
3. Queens Central Library, Jamaica.
- Curtin's Directories. New York, N.Y.: Dennis P. Curtin (publisher). LCCN x18016812; OCLC 1181263688 (all editions).
1. Curtin's Directory of Astoria, East New York, Flatbush, Flushing, Glen Cove, Greenport, Hempstead, Huntington, Jamaica, Newtown, Patchogue, Port Jefferson, Riverhead, Sag Harbor, and Setauket, Long Island – With a Business Directory of Patrons of the Work, and an Appendix Containing Important Information, 1865–66. OCLC 80672825, 820330043, 123496599, 83859702, 475935412.
2. Curtin's Directory of Astoria, East New York, Flatbush, Flushing, Glen Cove, Greenport, Hempstead, Huntington, Jamaica, Newtown, Patchogue, Port Jefferson, Riverhead, Rockaway, Roslyn, Sag Harbor, and Setauket, Long Island – With a Business Directory of Patrons of the Work, 1867–8. OCLC 79464867.
3. Curtin's Directory of Astoria, Babylon, Bath, Canarsie, Coldspring, College Point, Cypress Hill, East New York, Farmingdale, Flatbush, Flushing, Glen Cove, Greenpoint, Greenport, Hempstead, Huntington, Islip, Jamaica, Long Island City, Newtown, New Lotts, New Utrecht, Orient, Oyster Bay, Patchogue, Port Jefferson, River Head, Rockaway, Roslyn, Sag Harbor, Southold, Stonybrook and Woodhaven, Long Island. With a Business Directory of Patrons of the Work. 1868–9.
4. Curtin's Directory of Astoria, East New York, Flatbush, Flushing, Glen Cove, Greenport, Hempstead, Huntington, Jamaica, Newtown, Patchogue, Port Jefferson, Riverhead, Sag Harbor & Setauket, Long Island – With a Business Directory of Patrons of ... .
5. Curtin's Brooklyn Business Directory – Together With General Directory of Amityville, Babylon, Breslau, College Point, East New York, Flatbush, Flushing, Glen Cove, Gravesend, Greenpoint, Hempstead, Huntington, Islip, Jamaica, Long Island City, Newtown, New Utrecht, Oyster Bay, Patchogue, Port Jefferson, Riverhead, Rockaway, Roslyn, Sag Harbor, Sayville, Southold, Stonybrook, Whitestone and Woodhaven, Long Island, 1871–72.
6. n.d.: Curtin's Directory of Astoria, East New York, Flatbush, Flushing, Glen Cove, Greenport, Hempstead, Huntington, Jamaica, Newtown, Patchogue, Port Jefferson, Riverhead, Sag Harbor, and Setauket, Long Island – With a Business Directory of Patrons of the Work, and an Appendix Containing Important Information. Dennis P. Curtin. OCLC 475935412.
7. Curtin's Brooklyn and Long Island Business Directory for 1877–8 – Includes Brooklyn, and the residents of Amityville, Babylon, Breslan, College Point, East New York, Flatbush, Flushing, Freeport, Glen Cove, Gravesend, Greenport, Hempstead, Huntington, Islip, Jamaica, Long Island City, Northport, Newtown, Oyster Bay, Patchogue, Pearsalls, Port Jefferson, Riverhead, Rockaway, Rockville Centre, Roslyn, Sayville, Southold, Stonybrook, Whitestone, Woodhaven and Woodsburgh. Vol. 13.
- Metropolitan Directory Co.'s Directory of Richmond Hill & Woodhaven, N.Y. – Including Kew Gardens, Forest Hills & Ozone Park – Containing an Alphabetical List of the Residents, Their Occupations & Residences Together With a Classified Business. Metropolitan Directory Co. 1922. OCLC 1066636940.
- Norwood's Guide, First and Second Wards – Queens Best Street Directory – Corona, L.I. City, Woodside, Elmhurst, East Elmhurst, Jackson Heights, Maspeth, Glendale, Ridgewood, Forest Hills, Kew Gardens, Middle Village. Woodside, Queens: C.W. Norwood – Clarence Wesley Norwood (1894–1974). 1931. Queens 1st and 2nd Wards Only, street names old and newLCCN ca31000122; OCLC 1102113843 (all editions).
- Polk's New York City Directory (Boroughs of Queens and Richmond) – Containing an Alphabetical Directory of Business Concerns and Private Citizens, With Wives' First Names Shown [illegible]; A Street and Avenue Guide and Much Information of Miscellaneous Character; Also a Buyerss Guide and Complete Classified Business Directory, 1933–4 (Vol. 1) (NYPL Bar Code No. 3 3433 11990 3692). R.L. Polk & Co., Inc. 1933. → Digitized 2019, The New York Public Library Digital Collections. OCLC 32412222 (all editions); UUID 60eb200-63b3-0137-0e33-6d8cb27f4437.

Alternate link. January 1933.

- Robinson's Little Neck–Douglaston Red Book Resident Directory. Hempstead and Mineola, New York: Resident Directory Service, Inc. – Charles Herbert Robinson (1899–1969), President. 1940.
1. "For the Year Beginning September, 1938–1939" (Vol. 1). 1940. LCCN 41-36268; OCLC 866711087; FamilySearch 75185. (accessible via microfilm, only).
2. "For the Year Beginning November, 1940–41" (Vol. 2). 1940.
3. "1941–1942" (Vol. 3). 1941.
- Todd, Thomas H. Long Island Star Directory – The Star directory of Long Island City, Embracing Hunter's Point, Blissville, Dutch Kills, Ravenswood, Astoria, Steinway and the German Settlement – Containing Also a Business Directory of the City (Vol. 2). Long Island City: Daily and Weekly Star – Thomas H. Todd & Co. (publisher). LCCN 24-30843; OCLC 480682129 (all editions).
- Todd, Thomas H. (1894). The Star Directory of Long Island City – Embracing a General Directory of the Residents of Hunter's Point, Blissville, Dutch Kills, Ravenswood, Astoria, Steinway and the German Settlement, and North Beach – Also a Classified Business Directory of the Entire City, 1894–1895 (Vol. 3) (476 pages; 12,480 names). Long Island City: Daily and Weekly Star – Thomas H. Todd & Co. (publisher).OCLC 4327124.
- Trow's Business Directory of the Borough of Queens, City of New York. The Trow Directory, Printing & Bookbinding Co. (publisher). LCCN 01-31573; OCLC 987933571.
1. Vol. 5 (1902).
2. Vol. 7 (1906–1907).
3. Vol. 8 (1908–1909).

== Bibliography ==
=== References ===
Books, journals, magazines, papers, websites
- "Lower Montauk Branch Passenger Rail Study" (PDF). January 2018. → Prepared for the New York City Department of Transportation
- "Obituary – William King Murray". American Florist. 51 (1590). Chicago: 839. November 23, 1918 – via Google Books (Penn State). LCCN sf86-7011; OCLC 01479872 (all editions), OCLC 688575760 (all editions).
- Anderson, Thomas G. (2002) [2004]. This Fine Piece of Water: An Environmental History of Long Island Sound. foreword by Robert F. Kennedy, Jr. Yale University Press. pp. 69, 75, 90 – via Google Books (limited preview). The author, since 2011, has been Communications Director for the Connecticut Audubon Society. He is also the son-in-law of the late advertising executive, Gene Federico. LCCN 2001-6401; ISBN 0-3000-8250-9 (hard cover); ISBN 0-3001-0287-9 (paperback); ISBN 978-0-3001-0287-1; OCLC 56451289 (all editions).
- Armbruster, Eugene Louis (1914). Long Island – Its Early Days and Development – With Illustrations and Maps. "History of Long Island". (series) Eagle Library No. 182. Vol. 29; No. 6. Brooklyn Daily Eagle (publisher). Retrieved October 10, 2021. LCCN 14-12554; OCLC 3910404 (all editions).
1. Internet Archive (New York Public Library). 1914.
2. Internet Archive (Library of Congress. 1st copy). 1914.
3. Internet Archive (Library of Congress. 2nd copy). 1914.
- Beers, Frederick W. (1873). Atlas of Long Island, New York (Map). Beers, Comstock & Cline.
- Bolton, Reginald Pelham (1920). "New York City in Indian Possession". Indian Notes and Monographs. 2 (7). Museum of the American Indian, Heye Foundation. Retrieved October 18, 2021. LCCN 21-1838; OCLC 3425430 (all editions).
1. Via Google Books (Penn State). p. 271.
2. Via Internet Archive (Smithsonian). 1920. p. 271.
- Bunker, Mary Powell (1895). Long Island Genealogies – Families of Albertson, Andrews, Bedell, Birdsall, Bowne, Carman, Carr, Clowes, Cock, Cornelius, Covert, Dean, Doughty, Duryea, Feke, Frost, Haff, Hallock, Haydock, Hicks, Hopkins, Jackson, Jones, Keese, Ketcham, Kirby, Liones, Marvin, Merritt, Moore, Mott, Oakley, Onderdonck, Pearsall, Post, Powell, Prior, Robbins, Rodman, Rowland, Rushmore, Sands, Scudder, Seaman, Searing, Smith, Strickland, Titus, Townsend, Underhill, Valentine, Vanderdonk, Weeks, Whitman, Whitson, Willets, Williams, Willis, Wright, and Other Families – Being Kindred Descendants of Thomas Powell, of Bethpage, L.I., 1688 (descendants of Thomas Powell; 1641–1722). Albany: Joel Munsell's Sons (publisher). LCCN 03-13311; OCLC 841579522 (all editions).
1. "Records" – "A Copy of the Will of Thomas Powell". pp. 7–11 – via Google Books (Harvard).
- Chen, Hsiang-Shu (1992). Chinatown No More – Taiwan Immigrants in Contemporary New York. Cornell University Press. ISBN 9781501721366 – via Internet Archive. LCCN 91-55547; ISBN 978-0-8014-2697-1, 978-0-8014-9989-0; OCLC 231484714 (1990 PhD dissertation OCLC 301944818 (all editions)).
- Copquin, Claudia Gryvatz (2007) [2009]. The Neighborhoods of Queens (guide to 99 neighborhoods). Yale University Press. Retrieved September 21, 2021 – via Google Books. LCCN 2007-13716 (1st ed.; 2007); ISBN 978-0-3001-1299-3, 0-3001-1299-8 (2007); ISBN 978-0-3001-5133-6, 0-3001-5133-0, ISBN 978-0-3001-5005-6, 0-3001-5005-9; OCLC 262432302 (all editions).
1. Via Google Books (limited preview).
- "Creedmoor". Harper's Weekly. 21 (1082): 740 (illustration), 741 (team portrait), 743 (article), 745 (team portraits). August 1876.
- Curtin, Hugh A. (1888). Business Directory of New York City, Brooklyn, and Newark. Hugh A. Curtin (publisher) – via Internet Archive (Allen County Public Library).
- Driscoll, James (2005). Flushing, 1880–1935 (for the Voelker Orth Museum, Bird Sanctuary, and Victorian Garden). Charleston, South Carolina: Arcadia Publishing. Retrieved September 27, 2021 – via Google Books.LCCN 2005-925428; ISBN 0-7385-3842-6, 978-0-7385-3842-6; OCLC 62776699 (all editions).
1. Via Google Books ().
- Eardeley, William Applebie Daniel. History of Springfield, Town of Jamaica, Long island, New York (April 1913–March 1916). Queens, Religious Society of Friends, Monthly Meeting. Retrieved October 21, 2021.
1. "Flushing, Queens County, Long Island, New York – Intentions of Marriage, 1704–1776" – via Internet Archive (Library of Congress. Brooklyn, N.Y. April 1913. LCCN 24-16059; OCLC 1045564577 (all editions) & 24458528.
2. Vol. 1. "History of Springfield, Town of Jamaica, Long Island, New York" – via Internet Archive (Library of Congress). Brooklyn, N.Y. January 1914.
3. Vol. 1. "History of Springfield, Town of Jamaica, Long Island, New York" – via Google Books (NYPL). January 1914. LCCN 23-14854; OCLC 35918625 (all editions).
4. Vol. 1. "Cemeteries in Kings and Queens Counties, Long Island, New York, 1753–1913" – via Internet Archive (Library of Congress). Brooklyn, N.Y. March 1916. LCCN 23-14852; OCLC 22199020 (all editions).
- Flagg, Charles Allcott; Jennings, Judson Toll (February 1901). "Bibliography of Colonial New York History". New York State Library Bulletin 56; Bibliography 24 (submitted by Jennings for graduation from New York State Library School; class of 1897). Albany: University of the State of New York – via Google Books (Harvard). LCCN 03-20017; OCLC 64491000 (all editions).
- Hazelton, Henry "Harry" Isham (1925). The Boroughs of Brooklyn and Queens Counties of Nassau and Suffolk Long Island, New York, 1609–1924 (7 volumes). Lewis Historical Publishing Company, Inc. LCCN 25-10750; OCLC 498971362 (all editions), 247484068, 250867416.
1. Vol. 1 – via Google Books (Columbia University).
2. Vol. 2 – via Google Books (Wisconsin Historical Society).
3. Vol. 3 – via Google Books (Columbia University).
4. Vol. 4 – via Google Books (Wisconsin Historical Society).
5. Vol. 5. New York, Chicago, Lewis historical Pub. Co. 1925 – via Internet Archive (Allen County Public Library).
6. Vol. 6 – via Google Books (Wisconsin Historical Society).
7. Vol. 7 – via Google Books (Columbia University).
- Hunt, Harrison deForest IV; Bleyer, William Bleyer (2015). Long Island and the Civil War – Queens, Nassau and Suffolk Counties During the War Between the States. Charleston, South Carolina: The History Press – via Google Books. Retrieved October 21, 2026. LCCN 2015-931719; ISBN 978-1-6261-9771-8; OCLC 904037178 (all editions).
1. Via Google Books (1st copy) (preview only).
2. Via Google Books (2nd copy) (preview only).
- "Inventing Gotham – New York City and the American Dream: Consolidation". Mapsites.net (a virtual tour of New York City constructed for and by eleventh and twelfth grade students at the Fieldston School in The Bronx). Fieldston School, Department of History. n.d. Archived from the original on July 23, 2011 – via Mapsites.net (Wayback Machine).
1. Illustration & editorial: "The Lady or the Tiger?" (anti-consolidation editorial – illustration by Orrin Welch Simons; 1867–1930).. Vol. 54, no. 307. November 5, 1894. p. 19 – via Newspapers.com & the Brooklyn Public Library. (criticized by The New-York Times).
2. Document A: 1834: General Jeremiah Johnson (1766–1852)
3. Document B: 1834: Consolidation Committee of the State legislature
4. Document C: 1849: New-York Daily Tribune (a Republican newspaper)
  1. "Union of New-York and Brooklyn". Vol. 8, no. 202. December 1, 1848. p. 2 (column 6; bottom). Retrieved November 9, 2021.
    1. Via Fultonhistory.com (PDF)..
    2. Chronicling America..
    3. Via Newspapers.com.
  1. "Board of Assistant Aldermen" ... "Monday, Jan. 29" – "Communication". Vol. 8, no. 252. January 30, 1849. p. 2 (column 7; top). Retrieved November 9, 2021.
    1. Via Fultonhistory.com (PDF)..
    2. Chronicling America..
    3. Via Newspapers.com.
5. Document D: Andrew Haswell Green (1820–1903)
6. Document E: Popular joke
7. Document F: 1894: Opper, Frederick Burr (January 18, 1893). "Selfish Objections to a Good Match" (political cartoon).. Vol. 32 (828). p. 358 – via Google Books (Harvard). (see c:File:Selfish objections to a good match.jpg).
8. Document G: 1896: Storrs, Richard Salter. "Remarks at an Anti-Consolidation Mass Meeting, January 13, 1896". Vol. Pamphlet No. 6. Brooklyn: League of Loyal Citizens Pamphlet (publisher). p. 10. OCLC 155450275, 34313996.
9. Document H: 1893: St. Clair McKelway (1905–1980), editor of the Brooklyn Eagle
  1. "Real Estate Men's Dinner". Vol. 42, no. 12932. February 3, 1893. p. 5 (column 1). Retrieved November 9, 2021.
    1. Via Internet Archive.. February 3, 1893.
10. "We have no streets analogous to your Fifth Avenue, but neither have we any resembling those of your tenderloin district. With us are as yet no extremes of wealth or poverty, but the families of moderate means are becoming fewer with you."
11. Document I: Consolidation League
12. Document J: League of Loyal Citizens
13. Document K: "The Annual Report of the Chamber of Commerce ... ". Vol. 37, no. 11441. May 1, 1888. p. 4 (column 1). Retrieved November 9, 2021.
  1. Via Internet Archive.. May 1888.
  [Consolidation is] "a question which often arises in the minds of citizens of New-York who have faith in its future growth and in what Mayor Hewitt has called its 'imperial destiny.'"
14. Document L: 1894: Results of the Consolidation Referendum
- "Joel Smith Kelsey". Biographical Catalogue of the Xi Chapter of the Zeta Psi Fraternity at the University of Michigan, Ann Arbor, Michigan, 1858–1897. By Zeta Psi Fraternity. Xi Chapter, University of Michigan. June 1897 – via Google Books (University of Michigan).
- John Colles, Jr. vs. The Trow Directory Company, et al (New York Supreme Court, General Term – First Department). New York: Pescia & Muratori, Law Printers → Anthony C. Pescia (1843–1892) & Peter Muratori. 1877 – via Google Books.
- Kelsey, Joel Smith (1896). History of Long Island City, New York. A Record of Its Early Settlement and Corporate Progress. Sketches of the Villages That Were Absorbed in the Growth of the Present Municipality. Its Business, Finance, Manufactures, and Form of Government, With Some Notice of the Men Who Built the City. Long Island Star Publishing Company. Retrieved October 5, 2021. LCCN 11-25202; OCLC 5917590 (all editions).
1. Via HathiTrust (Library of Congress). Issued by the Long Island Star Publishing Company. 1896.
2. Via Internet Archive (Library of Congress). [New York] Issued by the Long Island Star Publishing Company. 1896.
3. Via Internet Archive (Library of Congress). [New York] Issued by the Long Island Star Publishing Company. 1896.
- Ladd, Horatio Oliver (1914). The Origin and History of Grace Church, Jamaica, New York. New York: The Shakespeare Press, registered trade name of Charles H. Cochrane. Retrieved September 7, 2021. LCCN 14-12549; OCLC 1631479 (all editions).
1. Via Google Books (University of Wisconsin - Madison).
- Lawrence, Thomas (1858). Historical Genealogy of the Lawrence Family: From Their First Landing in This Country, A.D., 1635, to the Present Date, A.D., 1858. Edward O. Jenkins (printer). Retrieved October 11, 2021. LCCN 09-11635; OCLC 10819647 (all editions).
1. Via Google Books (Wisconsin Historical Society).
- Mandeville, Giles Henry (1860). Flushing, Past and Present, A Historical Sketch. Flushing: Home Lecture Committee of 1857–8. Retrieved October 10, 2021. LCCN 01-14907; OCLC 753988824 (all editions).
1. Via Internet Archive (Allen County Public Library). 1860.
2. Via Internet Archive (Library of Congress). Flushing, L.I., Home lecture committee of 1857-8. 1860.
- Macoskey, Arthur Robert (compiler), ed. (1939). "Early History of Long Island". Long Island Gazetteer – A Guide to Historic Places. Eagle Library No. 342. Vol. 54. Brooklyn: The Eagle Library, Inc. Retrieved November 8, 2021. LCCN 39-7071; OCLC 5057401 (all editions).
1. Via HathiTrust (University of California).. Eagle Library. 1939.
- McGlinn, Lawrence Alan (2002). "Beyond Chinatown: Dual Immigration and the Chinese Population of Metropolitan New York City" (PDF). Middle States Geographer. 35. Middle States Division of the Association of American Geographers (publisher): 110–119. ISSN 1067-2230.
- "Meyer, Cord". The National Cyclopaedia of American Biography, Being the History of the United States as Illustrated in the Lives of the Founders, Builders, and Defenders of the Republic, and of the Men and Women Who Are Doing the Work and Moulding the Thought of the Present Time. New York: James T. White & Company (James Terry White; 1845–1920). 1918. p. 221. Retrieved September 7, 2021. LCCN 21-21756; OCLC 6879488 (all editions).
1. Via Internet Archive (NYPL). Vol. 16. New York, J. T. White company.
- Middleton, Joseph Steward; Taylor, Alan McLean (1913). Eight Generations From William Thorne of Dorsetshire, England, and Lynn Mass. Privately printed by T.R. Marvin & Son of Boston – via Internet Archive (Allen County Public Library).. LCCN 16-23280; OCLC 1548590 (all editions).
- Millett, Larry (2012) [2002]. The Disappearance of Sherlock Holmes – Endnote 1. Chapter 18 (limited preview). The Fesler/Lampert Minnesota heritage book series. University of Minnesota Press – via Google Books. LCCN 2011-51268; ISBN 978-0-8166-6994-3 (hardback); ISBN 978-0-8166-6993-6 (paperback); OCLC 768480384 (all editions).
1. Via Google Books (limited preview). p. 326. doi:10.5749/j.ctttv9ds
2. Via Google Books (limited preview). p. 326. doi:10.5749/j.ctttv9ds
- Min, Pyong Gap (1995). Asian Americans: Contemporary Trends and Issues. SAGE Publications – via Internet Archive. LCCN 94-37827 (1995 ed.), LCCN 2005-6492 (2nd ed.; 2006); ISBN 0-8039-4335-0, 0-8039-4336-9; OCLC 468380454 (all editions).
- Monaghan, Charles (Spring 1998). "The Murrays of Murray Hill: A New York Quaker Family Before, During and After the Revolution". Quaker History. 87 (1): 35–56. doi:10.1353/qkh.1998.0006. JSTOR 41947373.
- Munsell (1882). 1683 – History of Queens County, New York: With Illustrations, Portraits, and Sketches of Prominent Families and Individuals. New York: W.W. Munsell & Co. → William Watkins Munsell; 1850–1919. Retrieved September 7, 2021. LCCN 01-14233; OCLC 4819282 (all editions).
1. Via HathiTrust (Columbia University). W.W. Munsell and Co. 1882.
2. Via Internet Archive (Columbia University). 1882.
- "The Neighborhoods of Long Island City". Greater Astoria Historical Society. Archived from the original on March 8, 2008.
- Nelson, William (1907). ""The Founder of the Van Buskirk Family in American". Proceedings of the New Jersey Historical Society – A Magazine History, Genealogy and Biography. Third Series: 1902–1903. Vol. 4, No. 2. New Jersey Historical Society (publisher). Paterson, New Jersey: Press Printing and Publishing Company (printer). pp. 75–89 (p. 88) – via Google Books University of Michigan. LCCN 12-37076; OCLC 02563735 (all editions).
- Portrait and Biological Record of Suffolk County (Long Island) New York – Containing Portraits and Biographical Sketches of Prominent and Representative Citizens of the County – Together With Biographies and Portraits of All the Presidents of the United States. Chapman Publishing Company. 1896. Retrieved October 10, 2021. LCCN 01-14266; OCLC 35905707 (all editions).
1. Via Google Books (New York Public Library). p. 396.
- Pritchard, Evan T. (2019) [2002; 2007]. Native New Yorkers – The Legacy of the Algonquin People of New York. Council Oak Books. Retrieved October 18, 2021. LCCN 2001-32389; OCLC 1055427021 (all editions).
1. Via Google Books; c. 1. (limited preview). p. 443; Note 29 (Chapter 5).
2. Via Google Books; c. 2. (limited preview). p. 443; Note 29 (Chapter 5).
- Robertson, Purcell B. (1974). Profiles of Selected Patentees Under the Kieft Patent to Flushing, October 10, 1645 (4 volumes, typescript, held at the Queens Public Library). Brooklyn: (publisher not identified). OCLC 123528495.
- Records of the Town of Southampton, Long Island (1639–1927). Retrieved October 26, 2021. LCCN 05-4100; OCLC 24357398 (all editions), OCLC 24357629 (all editions), OCLC 6308392 (all editions).

Editors, compilers, and transcribers:

Henry Parsons Hedges (1817–1911) (Books 1–3)
Edward Herrick Foster (1844–1932) (Books 1–3)
William Smith Pelletreau (1840–1918) (Books 1–3, 5–6)

1. The Third Book of Records of the Town of Southampton, Long Island, N.Y., With Other Ancient Documents of Historic Value, Including the Records From 1717 to 1807; Transcribed With Notes and an Introduction by Wm. S. Pelletreau, and Compiled by the Undersigned Committee, Appointed at Town Meeting, April 4th, 1876, and Published at the Expense of the Town, by Its Authority (1878). Sag Harbor: John H. Hunt (printer). 1874 – via Internet Archive (Library of Congress).
- Riker, James Jr. (1852). The Annals of Newtown, in Queens County, New-York: Containing Its History From Its First Settlement, Together With Many Interesting Facts Concerning the Adjacent Towns; Also, a Particular Account of Numerous Long Island Families Now Spread Over This and Various Other States of the Union. New York: D. Fanshaw. Retrieved September 4, 2021. LCCN 01-14941; OCLC 1264039133 (all editions), 58788151.
1. Via Internet Archive (Columbia University). 1852.
2. Google Books (Princeton University).
- Ross, Peter; Pelletreau, William Smith (1902). The History of Long Island, From Its Earliest Settlement to the Present Time (3 volumes). New York: The Lewis Publishing Company. Retrieved October 26, 2021. LCCN 02-14589; OCLC 5691049 (all editions).
1. Vol. 1. Chapter 44 – "Flushing". pp. 528–537 – via Google Books (University of Michigan).
2. Vol. 2 – via Google Books (Penn State).
3. Vol. 3 – via Google Books (University of Michigan).
- Seaman, Mary Thomas (1928). The Seaman Family in America as Descended from Captain John Seaman of Hempstead, Long Island. James Haviland Seaman Jr. Tobias A. Wright, Inc. (printer). Retrieved October 10, 2021. LCCN 30-13140; OCLC 45383808 (all editions).
1. Via Internet Archive. 1928.
- Seyfried, Vincent Francis (2010) [1995]. Jackson, Kenneth Terry (ed.). Encyclopedia of New York City (2nd ed.). Yale University Press & New-York Historical Society (publisher) – via Internet Archive. LCCN 2010-31294; ISBN 0-3001-1465-6, 978-0-300-11465-2; OCLC 1088488960 (all editions).
- von Skal, George Hugo August Eugen (1908). Illustrated History of the Borough of Queens, New York City. New York: F. T. Smiley Publishing Co. → Frederick Thomas Smiley (1857–1910); Jerome Chester Smiley (1882–1968) – via Google Books (Harvard). → also accessible via Internet Archive (Library of Congress). LCCN 10-8903; OCLC 5883592 (all editions).
1. Part I – "A History of the Borough of Queens". pp. 7–30.
  → Re: "Hallett's Cove".
2. Part II – "Queens Borough of the Present Day". pp. 31–38.
3. Part III – "Noteworthy Buildings and Places". pp. 39–70.
4. Part IV – "Men of Mark". pp. 71–90.
5. Part V – "A Glance to the Past and the Future". pp. 91–104.
6. Part VI – "The Flushing Journal". pp. 105–112.
7. "Biographical Sketches". pp. 113–167.
- Natural Area Mapping and Inventory of Spring Creek 1988 Survey (PDF). Prepared by the City of New York, Parks and Recreation, Natural Resources Group; Michael R. Bloomberg, Mayor; Adrian Benepe, Commissioner. 2012.
- Stadler, Derek M. (October 6, 2014). "The History of Long Island City: Details of its Short-Lived Days as Both an Incorporated Municipality and the Major Western Terminus of the Long Island Rail Road" (WordPress blog). Archived from the original on October 7, 2021.
- "The State Troops" – "Creedmoor". Army and Navy Journal. 27 (2) (whole no. 1259): 29. September 7, 1889 – via Google Books (Cornell University).
- Sullivan, James; Williams, Edwin Melvin; Fitzpatrick, James Benedict; Conklin, Edwin Pierson, eds. (1927). History of New York State, 1523–1927 (6 volumes – biographies in volume 6). New York and Chicago: Lewis Historical Publishing Company, Inc. Retrieved December 28, 2007. LCCN 27-24237; OCLC 5122461 (all editions).
1. Vol. 1. Part II. Chapter 4 – "Growth and Achievement" – via HathiTrust (University of Virginia). Lewis historical publishing company. 1927. pp. 340–141.
2. Vol. 1. Part II. Chapter 4 – "Growth and Achievement" – via Geneanet.org. Archived from the original on August 22, 2007 – via Wayback Machine.
- Sutton, Philip (December 14, 2010). "A Look at "The Book": The Fall and Rise of the Telephone Directory". NYPL, Milstein Division of U.S. History, Local History & Genealogy, Stephen A. Schwarzman Building.
- Thomas, John Jacobs (1858). "Nurseries of the United States and Canada". The Illustrated Annual Register of Rural Affairs and Cultivator Almanac for the Year 1858. 4. Albany, New York: Luther Tucker & Son. New York: C.M. Saxton & Co.: 205–215 – via Google Books (University of Pennsylvania). LCCN 17-973; OCLC 1772117 (all editions).
- Thompson, Benjamin Franklin. Jolly Werner, Charles (ed.). History of Long Island – From Its Discovery & Settlement to the Present Time. Retrieved August 24, 2021. LCCN 61-18270, LCCN 18-7130; OCLC 4243058 (all editions).
1. 1st ed. (1839). New York: Eli French (1800–1868) (printer) – via Google Books (Harvard).
2. 2nd ed. (1843; revised and greatly enlarged). New York: Gould, Banks & Co. (publisher).
  1. Vol. 1. – via Google Books (Harvard).
  2. Vol. 2. – via Google Books (Harvard).
3. 3rd ed. (1918; revised and enlarged with additions). New York: Robert H. Dodd (publisher).
  1. Vol. 1. – via Google Books (Harvard).
  2. Vol. 2. – via Google Books (Wisconsin State Historical Society).
  3. Vol. 3. – via Google Books (Wisconsin State Historical Society).
- Transcriptions of Early Town Records of New York. Historical Records Survey, New York City. June 1940. LCCN 40-29275; OCLC 2591110 (all editions).
1. Vol. 1. "Town Minutes of Newtown, 1656–1688" – via Google Books.
- Trébor, Haynes (1945). Colonial Flushing – A Brief History of the Town of Flushing – Called by the Dutch Vlissingen – Founded in 1645: On Long Island in the Province of New Netherland – Afterward, The Province and State of New York. Flushing Tercentenary, 1645–1945. Flushing Federal Savings and Loan Association. Retrieved October 26, 2021. LCCN 45-5847; OCLC 6328913 (all editions).
1. Via FamilySearch.
- 8 Trow Queens Directories – via FamilySearch Catalog No. 477956. Filmed by the New York Public Library Photographic Service, 1984–1985. 4 microfilm reels; 35 mm.
1. The following is on one film (Digital Genealogical Society Film No. 8285471):
  1. Vol. 1. 1898: FHC No. 1710435 ← link (accessible online).; (images 12–192).
  2. Vol. 9. 1909–1910: FHC No. 1710435 ← link (accessible online).; (images 206–318).
  3. Vol. 10. 1912: FHC No. 1710435 ← link (accessible online).; (images 332–511).
2. The following is on one film (DGS Film No. 8285469):
  1. Vol. 2. 1899: FHC No. 1705173 (Item 1) ← link (onsite access only).
  2. Vol. 4. 1901: FHC No. 1705173 (Item 2) ← link (onsite access only).
  3. Vol. 6. 1904: FHC No. 1705173 (Item 3) ← link (onsite access only).
3. The following is on one film (DGS Film No. 8285470):
  1. Vol. 7. 1906–1907: FHC No. 1705174 (Item 1) ← link (onsite access only).
  2. Vol. 8. 1908–1909: FHC No. 1705174 (Item 2) ← link (onsite access only).
4. The following is on one film (DGS Film No. 8285472):
  1. Vol. 1. 1898: FHC No. 1758643 (Item 1) ← link (accessible online). (images 5–185).
  2. Vol. 9. 1909–1910: FHC No. 1758643 (Item 2) ← link (accessible online). (images 198–310).
  3. Vol. 10. 1912: FHC No. 1758643 (Item 3) ← link (accessible online). (images 314–503).
- 1 Trow Queens Direrctory – via Ancestry.com.
1. Vol. 10. 1912: Ancestry.com ← link (accessible online). → Note: Under the former Myfamily.com website, database ID 8773. Under the current Ancestry.com, database ID 2469 (beginning at image 1622334).
- Võ, Linda Trinh; Bonus, Enrique Caudal (2002). Contemporary Asian American Communities – Intersections and Divergences. Temple University Press – via Internet Archive. LCCN 2001-52506; ISBN 1-5663-9937-8, 1-5663-9938-6; OCLC 940841920, 704464509, 1162333227 (ProQuest eBook).
- Waller, Henry Davey (1899). History of the Town of Flushing, Long Island, New York. J. H. Ridenour → John Henry Ridenour (1858–1928). Retrieved September 7, 2021. LCCN 99-1006; OCLC 1189684220 (all editions); 1048538780.
1. Via Internet Archive (Library of Congress). Flushing, J. H. Ridenour. 1899.
- Walling, Henry Francis (1859). "Topographical Map of the Counties of Kings and Queens, New York". New York: W.E. & A.A. Baker (publishers). New York: Engraved, colored, printed & mounted at H.F. Walling's Map Establishment. LCCN 2013-593266; OCLC 21689954 (all editions) & 557871755.
  The publishers, William Edwin Baker (1830–1909) and his brother, Abishai Alden Baker (1835–1933) – both Hartford-based insurance agents who also published and sold maps – were descendants of Elizabeth Alden, a well-known pilgrim.
1. "A.A. Baker Dies at Home in Colchester". Vol. 94. February 26, 1931. p. 4 – via Newspapers.com.
2. "Official Seeks Restoration of Map – Colchester". Vol. 143, no. 81. May 21, 1980. p. 28 (section W) – via Newspapers.com. " ... A.A. Baker, a local insurance agent and map salesman of the period." (re: 1854 Map of New London County, published by Beers).
- Waxman, Sarah Beth. "The History of New York's Chinatown". ny.com → Mediabridge Infosystems, Inc..
Citations from the article:
1. Seyfried, Vincent Francis (2010) [1995]. Jackson, Kenneth Terry (ed.). Encyclopedia of New York City (2nd ed.). Yale University Press & New-York Historical Society (publisher) – via Internet Archive. LCCN 2010-31294; ISBN 0-3001-1465-6, 978-0-300-11465-2; OCLC 1088488960 (all editions).
2. Kwong, Peter (1991) [1987]. The New Chinatown (American Century Series) (3rd printing; 1st ed.). Hill and Wang (1987); Noonday Press (1991; third printing, 1st ed.). ISBN 9780374521219 – via Internet Archive. LCCN 87-14068 (1987), LCCN 0809-15854 (1996); ISBN 0-3745-2121-2, 978-0-3745-2121-9; OCLC 867454589 (all editions).
3. Kinkead, Gwen Edith (1992). Chinatown: A Portrait of a Closed Society. HarperCollins. ISBN 9780060167769 – via Internet Archive. LCCN 91-59931; ISBN 0-0601-6776-9; OCLC 936054701 (all editions).
4. Hall, Bruce Edward (1998). The Tea That Burns – A Family Memoir of Chinatown. The Free Press – via Internet Archive. LCCN 98-6471; ISBN 0-6848-3989-X; OCLC 607017389 (all editions).
- Whittaker, Frederick (August 1876). "The Story of Creedmoor". The Galaxy. 22 (2): 258–266 – via Google Books (Princeton University.
- Williams, Keith (October 20, 2015). "How Queens Became New York City's Largest Borough". Curbed. Archived from the original on October 4, 2021.
News Media
- "Rifle Practice – Important Meeting of the National Association Yesterday".. Vol. 33, no. 176. July 25, 1872. p. 4 (column 3; bottom) – via Newspapers.com & Brooklyn Public Library.
- "Another History Name Wiped from Long Island's Map – Call Newtown Emhurst Now".. Vol. 56, no. 56. February 26, 1896. p. 5 (column 1) – via Newspapers.com & Brooklyn Public Library.
- "Newtown is Elmhurst".. Vol. 56, no. 94. April 4, 1896. p. 7 (column 5) – via Newspapers.com & Brooklyn Public Library.
- "Picturesque Past of Flushing Town".. Vol. 59, no. 272. October 1, 1899. p. 33 – via Newspapers.com & Brooklyn Public Library.
- "An Old Landmark Sold – The Willets Farm Come In Possession of the New England Development Company".. Vol. 61, no. 45 (Four O'Clock ed.). February 15, 1901. p. 7 (column 2) – via Newspapers.com & Brooklyn Public Library.
- "How The Villages Got Their Names" (series)". Retrieved September 7, 2021. LCCN sn83-31151; OCLC 9817881 (all editions).
1. I. "Flushing" (Last ed.).. Vol. 70. November 7, 1916. p. 4 (column 3; top) – via Newspapers.com & Brooklyn Public Library.
2. II. "Long Island City" (Morning ed.).. Vol. 76. November 9, 1916. p. 2 (column 2; top) – via Newspapers.com & Brooklyn Public Library.
3. II. "Long Island City" (Four O'Clock ed.).. Vol. 76. November 9, 1916. p. 10 (column 5; middle) – via Newspapers.com & Brooklyn Public Library.
4. II. "Long Island City" (Four O'Clock ed.) (PDF).. Vol. 76. November 9, 1916. p. 10 (column 5; middle) – via Fultonhistory.com.
5. III. "College Point" (Morning ed.).. Vol. 76. November 10, 1916. p. 3 (column 4) – via Newspapers.com & Brooklyn Public Library.
6. III. "College Point" (Four O'Clock ed.).. Vol. 76. November 10, 1916. p. 12 (column 5) – via Newspapers.com & Brooklyn Public Library.
7. "Ravenswood" (Morning ed.).. Vol. 76. November 19, 1916. p. 8 (section 7; column 6) – via Newspapers.com (Brooklyn Public Library).
8. "Hunters Point" (Morning ed.).. Vol. 76. November 26, 1916. p. 9 (section 7; "Local News"; column 2; bottom) – via Newspapers.com & Brooklyn Public Library.
9. "Hunters Point" (Morning ed.).. Vol. 70. November 26, 1916. p. 9 (section 7; "Local News"; column 2; bottom) – via Newspapers.com (Brooklyn Public Library).
- "How Your Queens 'Village' Was Names".. Vol. 94, no. 132 (Morning ed.). May 13, 1935. p. 20 – via Newspapers.com & Brooklyn Public Library.
- "Life On the Ocean Wave". Vol. 40 (Long Island ed.). January 18, 1888. p. 1 – via Newspapers.com.
- "Bernardus Hendrickson Creed" (obituary). Vol. 42. May 4, 1889. p. 5 (column 3; middle) – via Newspapers.com.
- "Bloodgood Burial Plot". November 9, 1904. p. 7 (column 2) – via Newspapers.com.
- "Death of Another Old Citizen". Vol. 49. September 18, 1846. p. 2 – via GenealogyBank.com.
- "It Is Not Generally Known ... ".. Vol. 2, no. 133. Grand Forks, North Dakota. June 5, 1907. p. 6 (column 5; near the bottom) – via Chronicling America. LCCN sn85-42373.
- "College Point Village". April 21, 1855. LCCN sn83030999; OCLC 9737627 (all editions).
- Innes, John H. (March 24, 1898). "Ancient Newtown – Formerly Middleburg – The Narrow Passage and the Wolf Swamp – The Dutch Kills – Burger's Mill and Sluice" (PDF) (article 10).. LCCN sn84031667.
- "300th Anniversary of the Founding of the Town of New Towne, in Commemoration of the Granting of Its First Patent on March 28, 1642 Under the Auspices of Newtown Historical Society, 1642–1942". – via Columbia University.
- "Queens Directory: Got Your Number". Vol. 59, no. 263. April 28, 1978. p. 16 (section XQ) – via Newspapers.com.
- "Buying Off A Directory – Competition Between the Trow and Goulding Issues" (PDF).. Vol. 36, no. 11209. March 2, 1877. p. 8 (column 2) – via Fultonhistory.com. (Alternate link – via Newspapers.com.)
- "Even Fictitious Names Copied". New-York Tribune. Vol. 48, no. 15189. June 16, 1888. p. 4 – via Newspapers.com.
- "Trying to Buy Off Printers" (PDF) (re: James Colles, Jr., vs. John F. Trow and Edward P. Beach).. Vol. 26, no. 7946. March 2, 1877. p. 3 (column 1) – via Fultonhistory.com. (Alternate link – via Newspapers.com.) (Permalink – via TimesMachine.).
- "Will Celebrate Its Birthday – Flushing's Two Hundred and Fiftieth Anniversary – Preparations for the Festivities – Will Be Held in September and Will Last for Three Days at Least – Good Government of the Village Interesting History of a Long Island Township Which Was First Settled in 1644 – A Band of English Pioneers Tie First Comers – The Town Named by Dutch Colonists – Many Quakers Followed Them – What Flushing Village Is Like – Beautifully Situated and Laid Out – Many Churches and Splendid Schools – A New and Well-Equipped Hospital – The Good Citizenship League – Fire and Police Departments – Social and Athletic Organizations" (PDF).. Vol. 43, no. 13353. June 10, 1894. p. 20. (alternative access → permalink – via TimesMachine.)
- "The State Vote Canvassed – Official Announcement of the Result of the Election – Morton's Plurality 156,108 and Saxton's 127,483 – The Detailed Vote for Greater New-York" (PDF).. Vol. 44, no. 13515. December 15, 1894. p. 9 (Section 2; column 4). → The area included a radius of twenty miles (32 km), with the New York City Hall as a center to circumscribe it. (alternative access → permalink – via TimesMachine.)
- "Old Man Killed Running Across Track". November 3, 1898. p. 7.
- "Ice Officials to Plead – The Beaver Pond Nuissance Case Comes Up Tomorrow" (PDF).. Vol. 55, no. 17641. May 13, 1906. p. 5 (column 4) – via Fultonhistory.com. Alternative access → (Alternate link – via Newspapers.com.) (pdf (PDF) – via TimesMachine.) (permalink – via TimesMachine.).
- Semple, Kirk (June 23, 2011). "Asian New Yorkers Seek Power to Match Numbers". The New York Times (New York print ed. → June 24, 2011; "Passing the One Million Mark, Asian New Yorkers Join Forces." Vol. 160, No. 55446. p. 18. Op. Late ed.; East Coast). Alternative access → permalink – via TimesMachine. EBSCOhost 61777961; ProQuest 2216804123 (online); ProQuest 873485240 (print ed.) (US Newsstream database).
- Hughes, Carroll Joseph Jr.) (March 6, 2020). "The Neighborhood Name Game". The New York Times (New York print ed. → March 8, 2020; "Neighborhood Name Game." Vol., No. 58626. p. 1. Section RE). EBSCOhost 142135260 (print ed.); ProQuest 2371652258 (online ed.) (US Newsstream database); ProQuest 2373440194 (print ed.) (US Newsstream database).
New York laws
- Bragg, Henry Willard (1896). "In the Matter of the Hearing in Relation to 'The Greater New York,' Held Before the Sub-Committee of the Joint Committee on the Affairs of Cities – Transmitted to the Legislature February 25, 1896". Documents of the Senate of the State of New York, One Hundredth and Nineteenth Session. Vol. 6, No. 44. Albany and New York: Wynkoop Hallenbeck Crawford Co. Retrieved October 21, 2021. LCCN 54-45849; OCLC 1695914 (all editions).
1. Bragg, Henry W. (January 23, 1896). Letter Addressed to William C. Redfield, President League of Loyal Citizens, Brooklyn, N.Y.. pp. 215–217 – via Google Books (University of Chicago).
Bragg, a Boston Municipal Court Judge in the Charleston District, expounds on the woes of the former Town of Charleston after Boston annexed it.
- Colonial Laws of New York From the Year 1664 to the Revolution, Including the Charters of the Duke of York, the Commissions and Instructions to Colonial Governors, the Duke's Laws, the Laws of the Dongan and Leisler Assemblies, the Charters of Albany and New York, and the Acts of the Colonial Legislatures From 1691 to 1775, Inclusive (5 volumes). Albany: James B. Lyon (1858–1924). 1894–1896. Retrieved September 8, 2021. LCCN 35-25349; OCLC 4602284 (all editions).
1. Vol. 1. "No. 107 – In Assembly – Report of the Commissioners of Statutory Revision – Historical Note". pp. xi–xii – via Google Books (New York State Legislature).
2. Vol. 1. Chapter 4 – Section 1. pp. 121–122 – via Google Books (New York State Legislature).
- Laws of the State of New York. Retrieved October 27, 2021
1. 1852: Chapter 276 – "An Act to Authorize the Building of a Draw or Pivot Bridge Over the Newtown Creek" (75th Session: January 6 – April 17, 1852 → Passed April 14, 1852). Albany, New York: Little & Co. p. 410 – via Google Books (Ohio State University).
2. 1897: Vol. 3: Chapter 378; Section 2: "Division Into Boroughs" (120th Session: January 6 – April 17, 1852 → Became Law May 4, 1897). New York and Albany: Banks & Brothers (A. Bleecker Banks). p. 2 – via Google Books (New York State Legislature). OCLC 61190319.
3. 1898: Vol. 2. Chapter 588. Section 1 (121st Session: January 6 – April 17, 1852 → Became Law April 27, 1898). Albany: James B. Lyon (printer). pp. 1336–1337 – via Google Books (NYPL).
4. 1908: Vol. 2. "Chapter 473". Section 1 (131st Session; Regular Session: January 1, 1908 – April 3, 1908; Extraordinary Session: May 11, 1908 – June 11, 1908 → passed May 22, 1908). Albany: J.B. Lyon Company (publisher). p. 1679 – via Google Books (University of Iowa).
- Addresses Before the Legislative Joint Sub-Committee on Consolidation. Series: No. 7. 1896. OCLC 80373853 (all editions), OCLC 34289324 (all editions).

Addresses:

1. Rev. Richard Salter Storrs, D.D. (1821–1900)
2. St. Clair McKelway, L.L.D. (1845–1915)
3. Alfred Tredway White, Esq. (1846–1921)
4. Henry William Maxwell, A.M. Ph.D. (1850–1902)

Letters:

5. Henry Willard Bragg (1841–1921)
6. Robert Dewey Benedict, Esq. (1828–1911)
- O'Callaghan, Edmund Bailey (1868). "Charter". Laws and Ordinances of New Netherland, 1638–1674 – Compiled and Translated From the Original Dutch Records in the Office of the Secretary of State, Albany, N.Y. Albany: Weed, Parsons and Company – via Google Books (Harvard University).
