= Caroline Augusta Huling =

American journalist

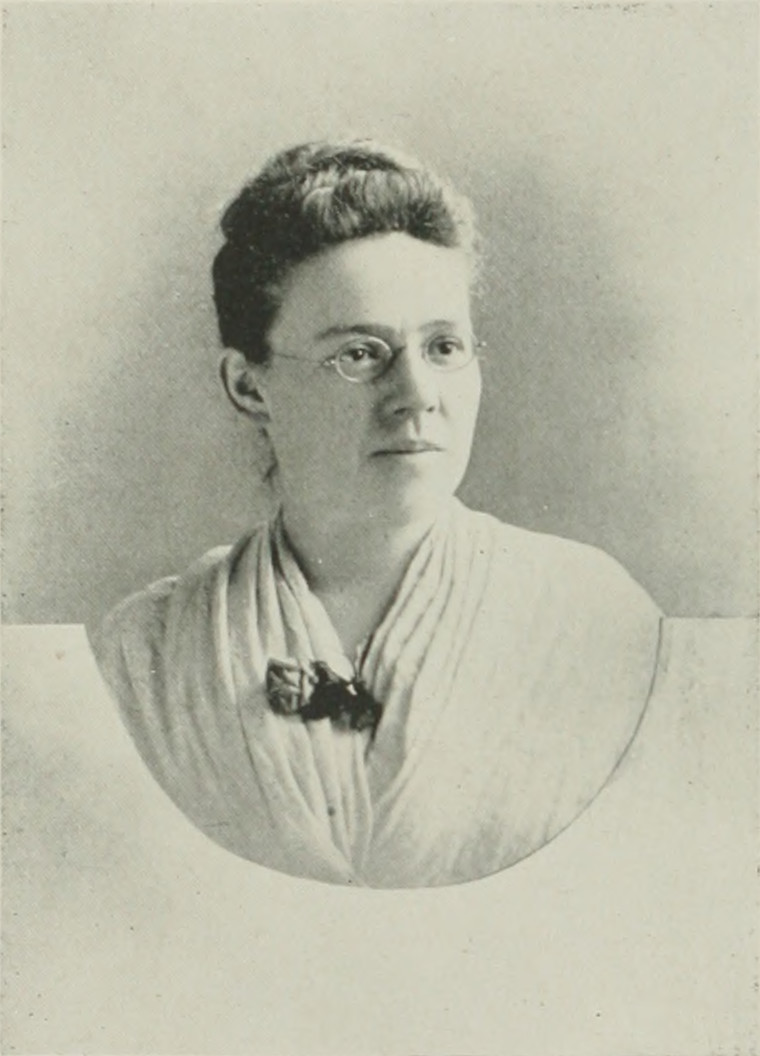
Caroline Augusta Huling

Caroline Augusta Alden Huling (April 2, 1856 – March 10, 1941) was an American journalist, philanthropist, editor, publisher, and reformer. Huling published The Bookseller and edited numerous newsletters, among them Social Progress, The Stylus, and The Sentinel. She also wrote two novels, The Courage of Her Convictions (1896) and Letters of a Business Woman to Her Niece.

== Early life and family ==
Caroline Augusta Alden Huling was born in Saratoga Springs, New York, on April 2, 1856. Her father was Edmund James Huling (1820–1891), editor and publisher in Saratoga Springs. He was public-spirited and liberal, and his daughter was said to owe much to the encouragement of both her parents. Her mother, Anna Rebecca Spooner (1822–1891), was the daughter of Colonel Alden Spooner of Brooklyn, New York. Alden Spooner's ancestors were also editors and publishers. Mrs. Huling's family was also literary minded. Among them were "Fanny Fern" (Sara Willis), Nathaniel Parker Willis, and the brothers Prime (Samuel I. Prime, Edward Dorr Griffin Prime and William Cowper Prime) who were her cousins. Her mother was directly descended from John Alden and Priscilla Alden (ascending line: Alden Spooner, Judah Paddock Spooner, Rebecca Paddock, Alice Alden, David Alden, John Alden), made famous by Henry Wadsworth Longfellow.

Huling was graduated from the village high school. Music, languages, and the periodicals of the day were studied after that date.

== Career ==
Caroline Augusta Huling chose journalism as her profession. Under the tutelage of her father she began active work when but twelve years old, starting with society reporting in the ballrooms of Saratoga Springs. Later on, sermons and conventions were entrusted to her.

For several years Huling followed the usual routine of most young women, entering society and taking an active interest in temperance and church work. In 1874 she became a Good Templar, holding her membership continuously until the end of the century. She was prominent in the work and held several offices in the lodges. When the Woman's Christian Temperance Union was organized, she was one of the first to don the white ribbon, the symbol of appartenance to the union. She was one of the first executive board members of the Humane society and secretary of the local Woman Suffrage Society. Much inspiration to greater efforts in the latter line was derived from frequent visits to Boston, where she mingled with those of similar tastes and studied the methods which they favored.

Huling was especially trained as a teacher and expected to follow that profession, but the ill health of both her parents prevented it, and, becoming tired of what seemed an idle life, she begged to enter business, and was duly installed as associate editor of the Saratoga Sentinel with her father, and became his right hand in all business matters, having special superintendence of his book-bindery. She was also a correspondent for many city papers. President Grover Cleveland, then Governor of New York and with whom her family had political connections, made her a notary public, the first woman in New York to be appointed a notary public.

Huling was for two years secretary of the Cook County Equal Suffrage Association, for two years superintendent of press work of the State society, and for one year county organizer. In 1884 she went to Chicago to attend the national suffrage convention and decided to move permanently and try to self-support herself as a journalist, devoting most of her time to the cause of woman's enfranchisement. There she became an associate editor of a trade journal, having responded to a want ad as "C. A. Huling", to avoid being identified as a woman.

In 1885 Huling was a founding member of the Illinois Woman's Press Association (IWPA), and for several years she was one of its executive board. In 1890 she represented the association in the National Newspaper Association, and was unanimously elected assistant recording secretary of that body, the first woman elected to office. Huling took great interest in the formation of the Illinois Woman's Alliance, in October 1888, and was elected president, serving two-years without opposition, and declining election the third year in order to devote herself to a working-woman's club, of which she was also president.

From October 1887 to November 1888, Huling edited and published an eight-page semi-monthly periodical called Justitia, a Court for the Unrepresented, in which she had a small pecuniary interest. It was the organ of the Illinois Equal Suffrage Association, and devoted to the advancement of women, social purity, and other reforms. Owing to differences of opinion regarding its editorial policy, Justitia was discontinued at the close of its first volume.

Huling was well and favorably known as a speaker, possessing a clear, distinct voice and an unconventional manner. In 1884 she made several addresses for the Prohibition party and exerted her personal influence in the lodge room and elsewhere for that party. She was known as a superior parliamentarian. When very young, she became a member of the Episcopal Church. For many years she was very devoted to that form of faith, but at the end of the 19th century she adopted the liberal tendencies of her father and became broadly undenominational, though still retaining a respect for the church in which she was reared and a nominal membership therein.

Much of Huling's work with the pen was in the line of unsigned editorial and special articles. She had a taste for fiction and more purely literary work and aspired to achieve success in that line, publishing a number of short stories. She especially delighted in news-editorial work and was peculiarly fitted for it.

In March 1888 Huling went to a conference in Washington, D.C., put on by the International Council of Women. There she served as a link connecting the Chicago and international women's movements.

In the fall of 1891 Huling aided in the organization of the Woman's Baking Company, and became its secretary. The philanthropic features of the plan appealed to her sympathies, and she relinquished her professional work in a great measure to aid her sisters, the company aiming to provide a good investment for small savings and an avenue of employment for many women.

Huling published The Bookseller and edited numerous newsletters, among them Social Progress, The Stylus, and The Sentinel. She additionally authored two novels, The Courage of Her Convictions (1896) and Letters of a Business Woman to Her Niece. In The Courage of Her Convictions the heroine, wanting a child but disillusioned by men, seeks artificial insemination as a compromise. In the end she decides that a child needs two parents after all, and marries her doctor, the father of the baby.

In 1912 Huling founded the Midwest chapter of Alden Kindred of America.

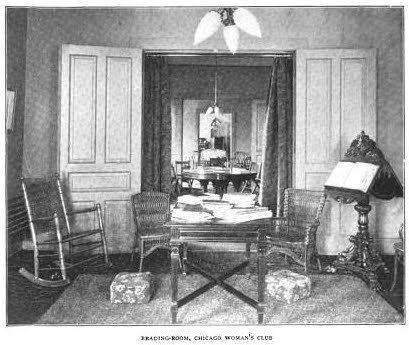
Reading Room of the Chicago Woman's Club

Huling was also an active member of many other societies. She was a member of the Daughters of the American Revolution, the Huguenot Society of Pennsylvania, the Institute of American Genealogy, the Woman's City Club of Chicago, and the Society of Midland Authors.

== Personal life ==
Both Huling's parents died in 1890. All of their nine living children were more or less connected with newspaper work, and were authors. All were married excepting Huling. They were: Maria Smith Huling (1843–1918, married George Oberne (1843–1911)), Alden Spooner Huling (born 1845, married Ida M. Ferris (born c. 1851)), Mary Jermaine Huling (born 1847, married (1) Eugene Dibble Ainsworth (born c. 1843) and (2) A. LeRoy Freeman (born c. 1843), Nancy L'Amoreux Huling (born 1850), John Beekman Huling (1852–1917, married Mary Eliza Eberwine (1859–1951)), Henry Pierson Huling (born 1853, married Ellen Newell (born c. 1854)), Katherine Barclay Huling (born 1858), Edmund James Huling (born 1860), Margaret Olivia Huling (1863–1874).

She died on March 10, 1941, and is buried at Oak Hill Cemetery, Downers Grove, Illinois.

== Legacy ==
The Caroline Alden Huling papers are housed in the Special Collections at the University of Illinois at Chicago.
