= Pliny Fisk =

American missionary

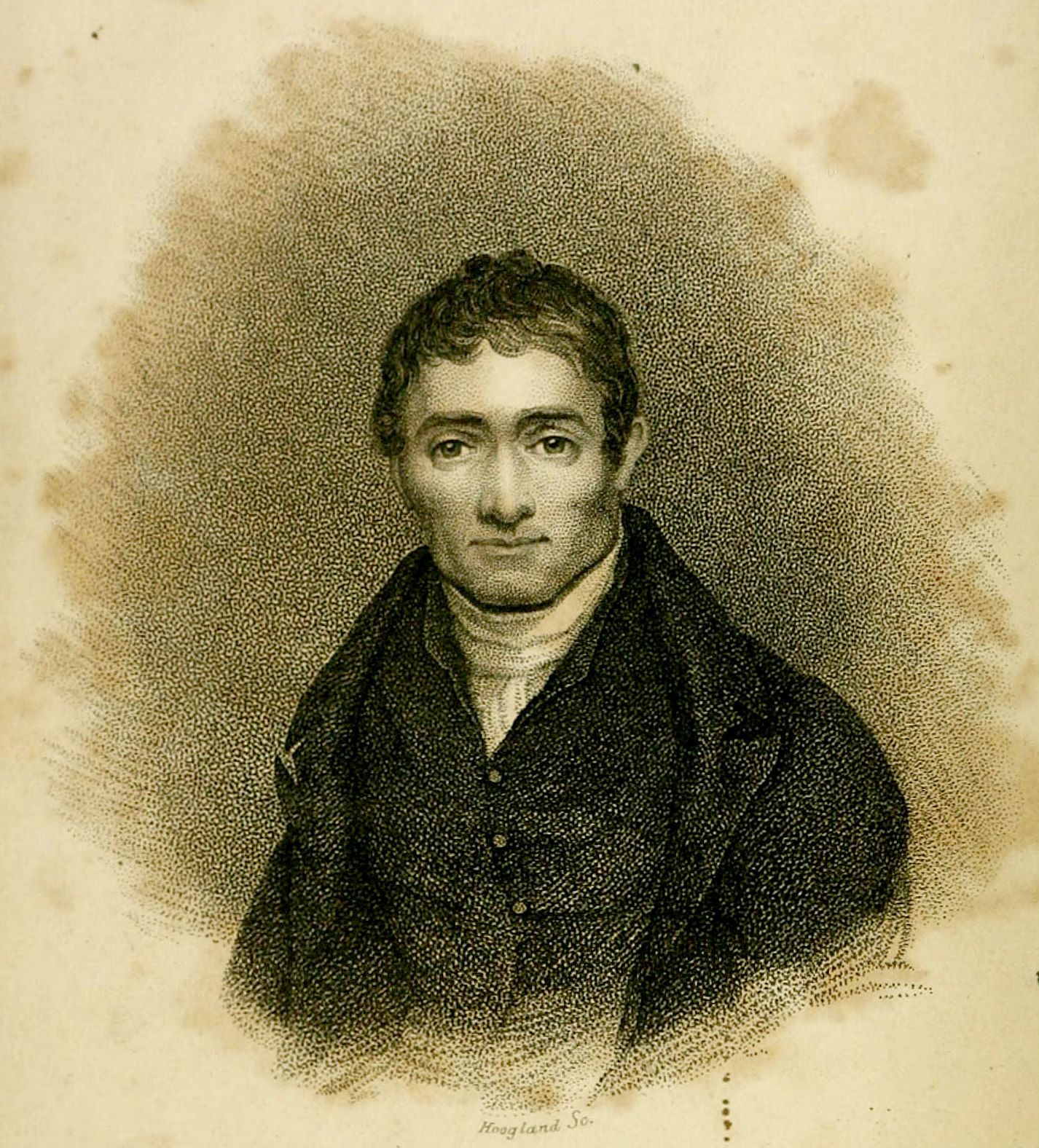

Signature
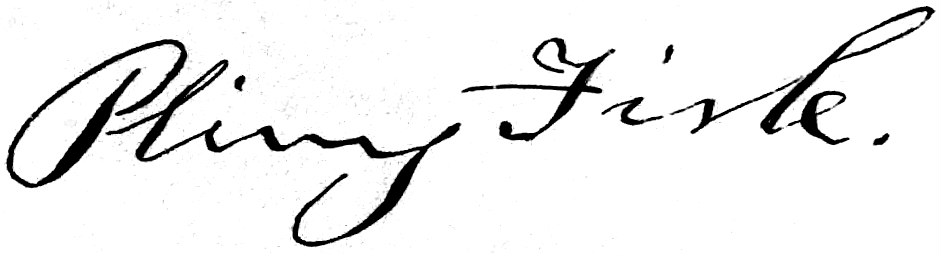

Pliny Fisk (born in Shelburne, Massachusetts, 24 June 1792; died in Beirut, Syria, 23 October 1825) was an American Congregationalist missionary to Europe and the Middle East.

== Biography ==
He graduated from Middlebury College in 1814, and from Andover Theological Seminary in 1818. He was appointed, with Levi Parsons, by the American Board, to the Palestine mission in 1818, and sailed from Boston for Smyrna, 3 November 1819. They served together until Parsons’ death in Alexandria in 1822.

Fisk travelled extensively in Greece, Egypt, Palestine, and Syria all then parts of the Ottoman Empire. During the course of his work, he served alongside Jonas King, William Goodell and Isaac Bird. In May 1825 he joined a mission already established in Beirut. He died there of fever in the following October.

His niece, Fidelia Fisk, was also a noted missionary.

Abolitionist Photius Fisk met Pliny when he was a missionary in Malta in 1822. Photius modeled his life after Pliny and legally changed his name from Kavasales to Fisk by an act of Congress in 1848. Photius Fisk was a teenager when he met Pliny and dedicated his life to the service of the poor and destitute. Pliny also helped another Greek American travel to the United States by securing his passage to the country. Pliny was very impressed by Gregory Anthony Perdicaris. Perdicaris met Fisk while he was briefly in Jerusalem the young Perdicaris spoke five languages. Perdicaris later became the first American consul to Greece and he was also one of the richest Greek Americans in U.S. history.

== Work ==
Fisk's ability to preach in Italian, French, Greek, and Arabic eminently fitted him to be a missionary. On the day of his death he completed an “English and Arabic Dictionary.” He wrote numerous papers for the Missionary Herald.
