= Biblical Researches in Palestine =

Travelogue of 19th-century Palestine by Edward Robinson

Biblical Researches in Palestine, Mount Sinai and Arabia Petraea
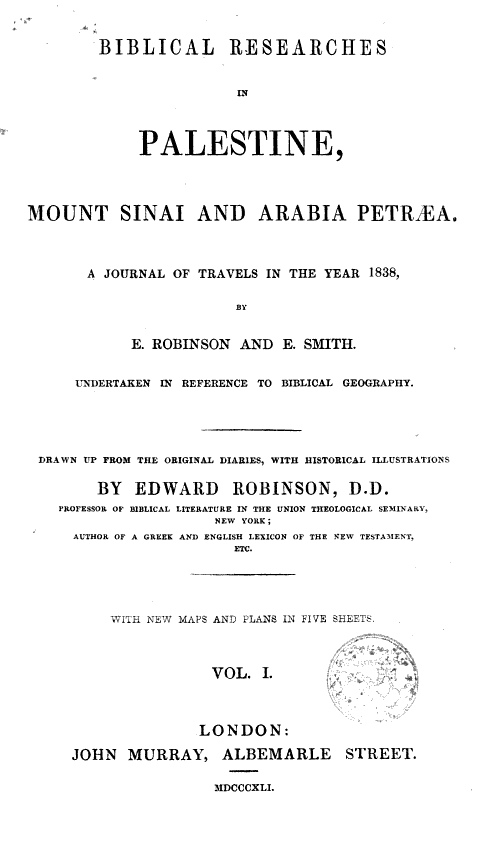
- Biblical Researches in Palestine cover
- Author: Edward Robinson with Eli Smith (guide, interpreter, co-author)
- Illustrator: Heinrich Kiepert
- Language: English
- Genre: Travel literature
- Publisher: John Murray
- Publication date: 1841
- Publication place: United Kingdom, United States, Germany

Biblical researches in Palestine, Mount Sinai and Arabia Petraea (1841 edition), also Biblical Researches in Palestine and the Adjacent Regions (1856 edition), was a travelogue of 19th-century Palestine and the magnum opus of the "Father of Biblical Geography", Edward Robinson. The work was published simultaneously in England, the United States (dedicated to Moses Stuart) and Germany (dedicated to Carl Ritter).

The work identified numerous Biblical localities for the first time, as well as significant Jerusalem archaeological sites such as Robinson's Arch (subsequently named for the author), and undertook the first scientific surveys of other sites such as the Siloam tunnel.

Robinson received a Royal Geographical Society Patron's Medal as a result of his work.

The work was accompanied by the Kiepert maps of Palestine and Jerusalem.

== Field work ==
Robinson made two journeys to Palestine. The first began on 12 March 1838 in Cairo, reached Jerusalem on 14 April, toured Arabia Petrea in May, arrived in Nazareth on 17 June, and ended in Beirut on 27 June, while the second began on 5 April 1852 in Beirut, where he arrived back again 19 June 1852 having explored much of Northern Palestine.

== Legacy ==
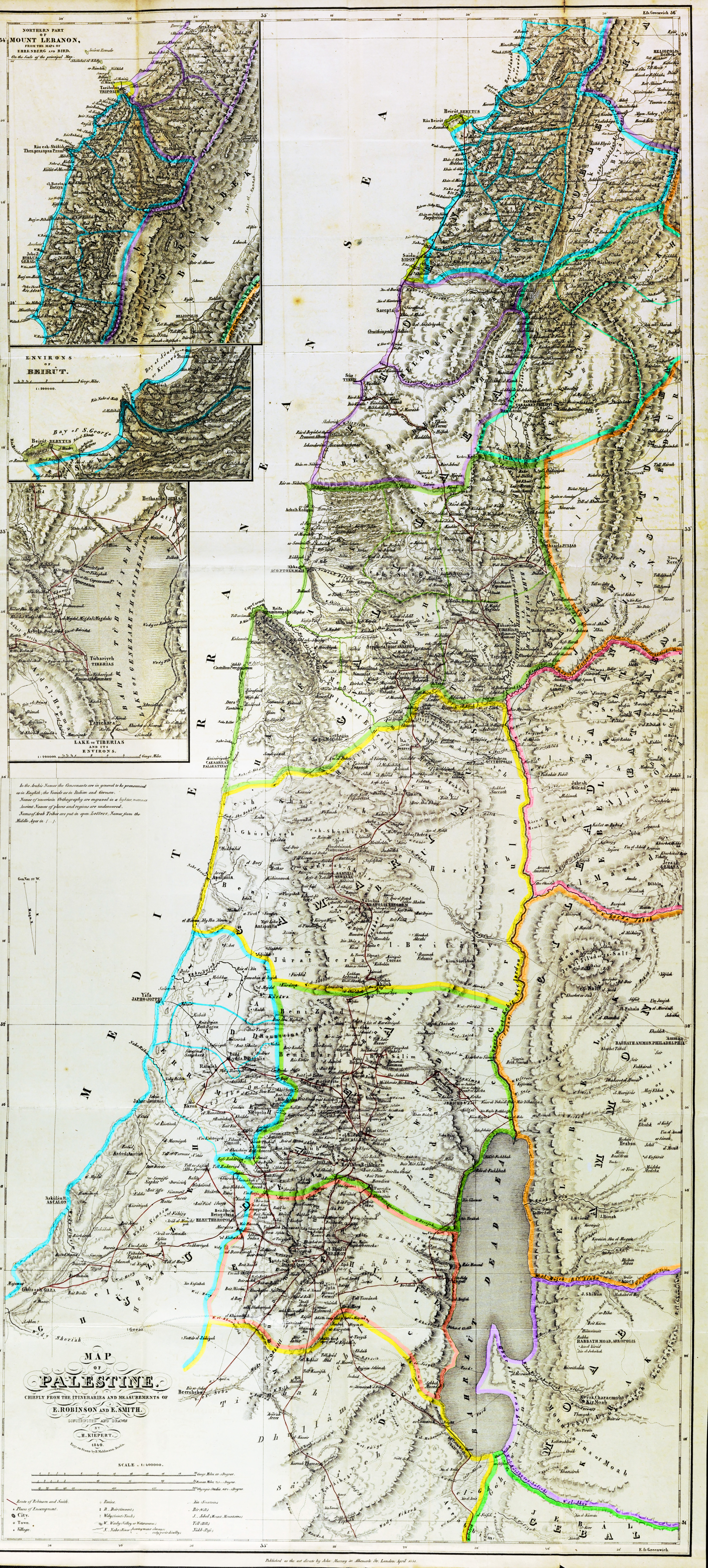
Kiepert's map accompanying the book

The work has been described as a "cornerstone of nineteenth century Palestine exploration". Earlier descriptions had relied on the accounts of travellers and legends, whereas Robinson and his guide and translator Eli Smith relied on only what they saw for themselves.

Albrecht Alt described the work as "epoch-making", and in describing the influence of the work in dispelling previously accepted knowledge of the region, stated: "he was able definitively to disprove a large part of what his predecessors had thought and had written. In Robinson's footnotes are forever buried the errors of many generations".

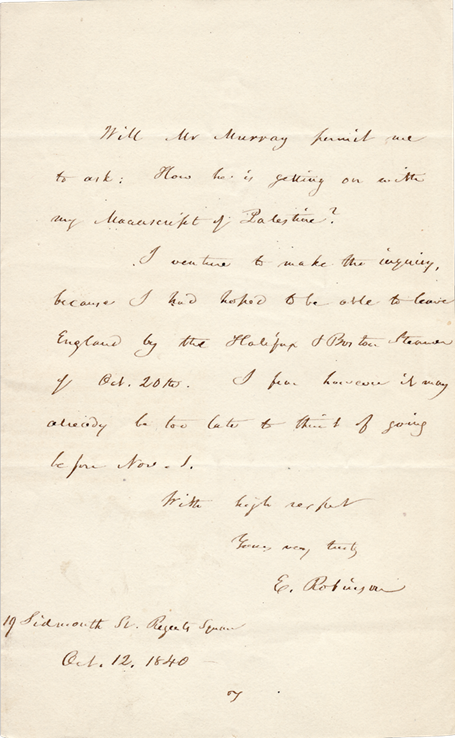
Robinson's October 1840 letter to his publisher enquiring regarding the upcoming publication

Professor Thomas W. Davis noted that "all later archaeological research in Palestine is in some way indebted to [Robinson]. His geographical study marked a new era". In a study of nineteenth century Biblical Studies in the United States, Jerry Wayne Brown described Robinson's work as "the most significant piece of American Biblical scholarship before the Civil War".

Professor Rana Issa of the American University of Beirut notes that the work relied on phonology as anthropological archaeology:

Phonology here works as a kind of anthropological archaeology. However, instead of excavating the land, Robinson excavated from the lips of the natives. Phonology also turns the natives into a landscape. Unlike Thomson, this landscape does not feed into a poetic imagination; rather it is a landscape that must be made to reveal the traces of the Bible scientifically. For Robinson and Smith, the natives unwittingly carry the "divine dialect" of the land. Based on information from their lips, Robinson turns Ain Shams into the Bible's Beit Shemesh, Ain and Beit being so seemingly common as to be interchangeable. 'Akir is Ekron, while Dura is the biblical Adora because "dropping of the first feeble letter is not uncommon." Robinson records what the natives say only to correct their pronouncements about the place names against the Bible. What they have to say is important as raw material, which will ultimately be made to take the shape of a word that occurs in the Bible.

== Online versions ==
=== First edition ===
- Robinson, Edward; Smith, Eli (1841). Biblical Researches in Palestine, Mount Sinai and Arabia Petraea: A Journal of Travels in the year 1838. Vol. 1. Boston: Crocker & Brewster.; Also at Göttinger DigitalisierungsZentrum
- Robinson, Edward; Smith, Eli (1841). Biblical Researches in Palestine, Mount Sinai and Arabia Petraea: A Journal of Travels in the year 1838. Vol. 2. Boston: Crocker & Brewster.
- Robinson, Edward; Smith, Eli (1841). Biblical Researches in Palestine, Mount Sinai and Arabia Petraea: A Journal of Travels in the year 1838. Vol. 3. Boston: Crocker & Brewster.

=== Second edition ===
- Robinson, Edward; Smith, Eli (1856). Biblical Researches in Palestine and adjacent regions: A Journal of Travels in the years 1838 and 1852, 2nd edition. Vol. 1. London: John Murray.; Also at Göttinger DigitalisierungsZentrum
- Robinson, Edward; Smith, Eli (1856). Later Biblical Researches in Palestine and adjacent regions: A Journal of Travels in the year 1852. London: John Murray.; Also at Göttinger DigitalisierungsZentrum

=== Maps ===
- Set of maps of Palestine, Mount Sinai, and Arabia Petraea (Accompanying the first edition)

[1] Sinai / H. Kiepert del; H. Mahlmann
[2] Temple-area : ancient vaults / F. Catherwood del.
[3] Tomb of Helena
[4] Plan of Jerusalem : sketched from Sieber and Catherwood, corrected by the measurements of Robinson and Smith / drawn by H. Kiepert
[5] Environs of Jerusalem : from the routes and observations of Robinson and Smith / drawn by H. Kiepert
[6] Map of the peninsula of Mount Sinai and Arabia Petraea : from the itineraries of E. Robinson and E. Smith / constructed and drawn by H. Kiepert; engr. on stone by H. Mahlmann.

== Bibliography ==
- Goldman, Shalom L. (2004). "Christian Hebraism and Palestine Exploration; Moses Stuart, Edward Robinson and Their Jewish "Informants"". God's Sacred Tongue: Hebrew and the American Imagination. University of North Carolina Press. pp. 137–162, 215. ISBN 978-1-4696-2023-7.
- King, Philip J. (1983). "Edward Robinson: Biblical Scholar" (PDF). The Biblical Archaeologist. 46 (4). The American Schools of Oriental Research: 230–232. doi:10.2307/3209782. JSTOR 3209782. S2CID 165586450. Archived from the original (PDF) on 2022-05-31.
- Bartlett, John Raymond (1997). Archaeology and Biblical Interpretation. Psychology Press. pp. 4–. ISBN 978-0-415-14114-7.
- Bewer, Julius A. (1939). "Edward Robinson as a Biblical Scholar". Journal of Biblical Literature. 58 (4). The Society of Biblical Literature: 355–363. doi:10.2307/3259707. JSTOR 3259707.
- Alt, Albrecht (1939). "Edward Robinson and the Historical Geography of Palestine". Journal of Biblical Literature. 58 (4). The Society of Biblical Literature: 373–377. doi:10.2307/3259709. JSTOR 3259709.
- Hitchcock, Roswell Dwight; Smith, Henry Boynton (1863). The Life, Writings and Character of Edward Robinson: Read Before the N. Y. Historical Society. A. D. F. Randolph.
