= Aqqur =

Aqqur عقور
- Etymology: barren
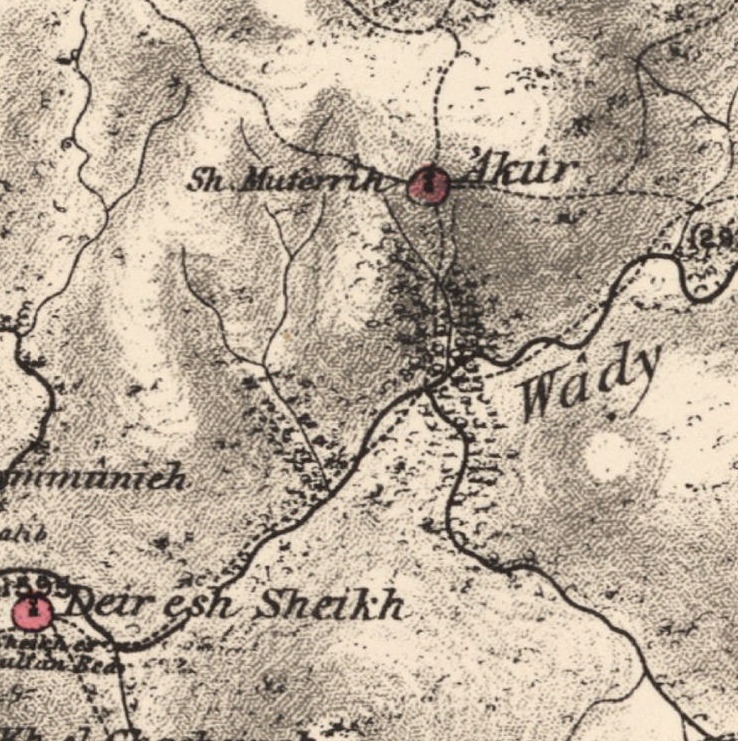
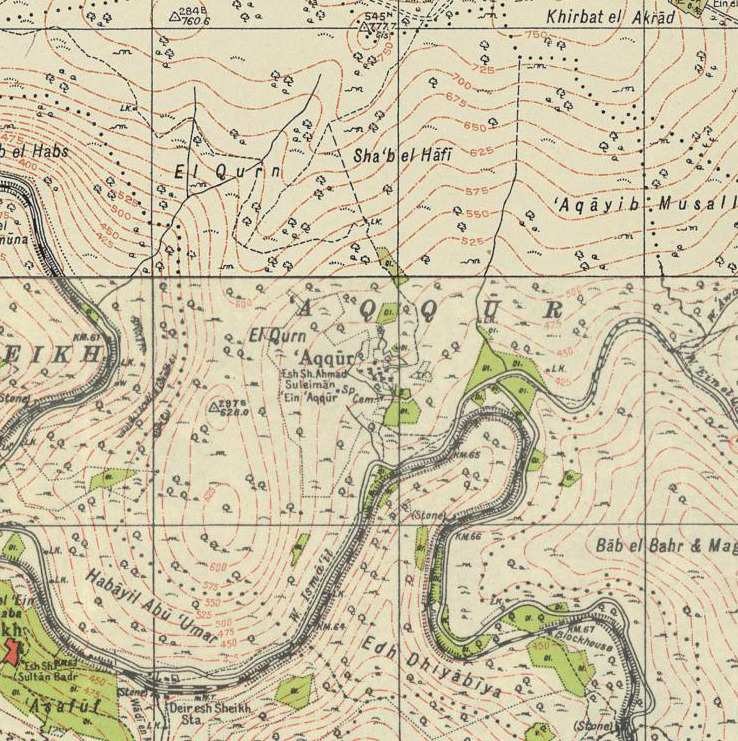
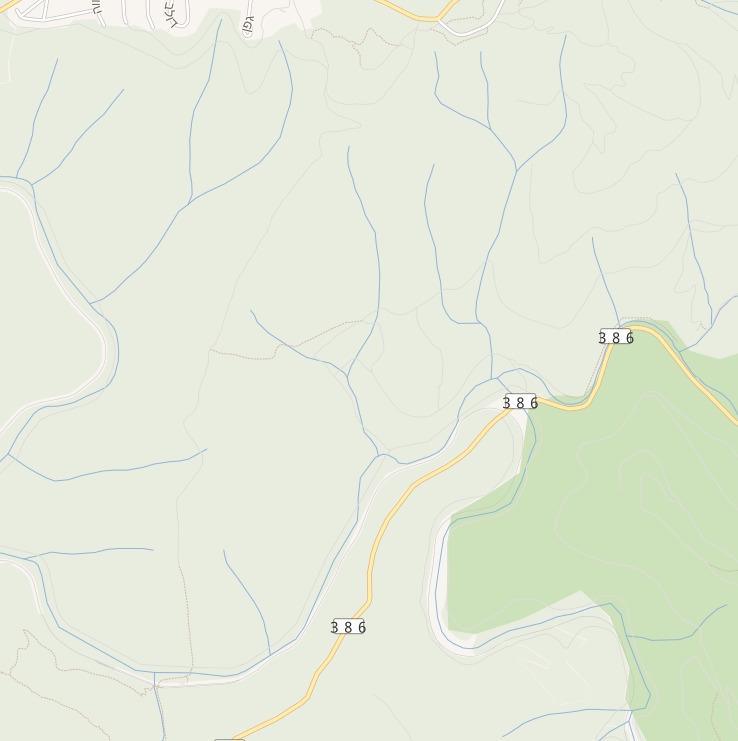
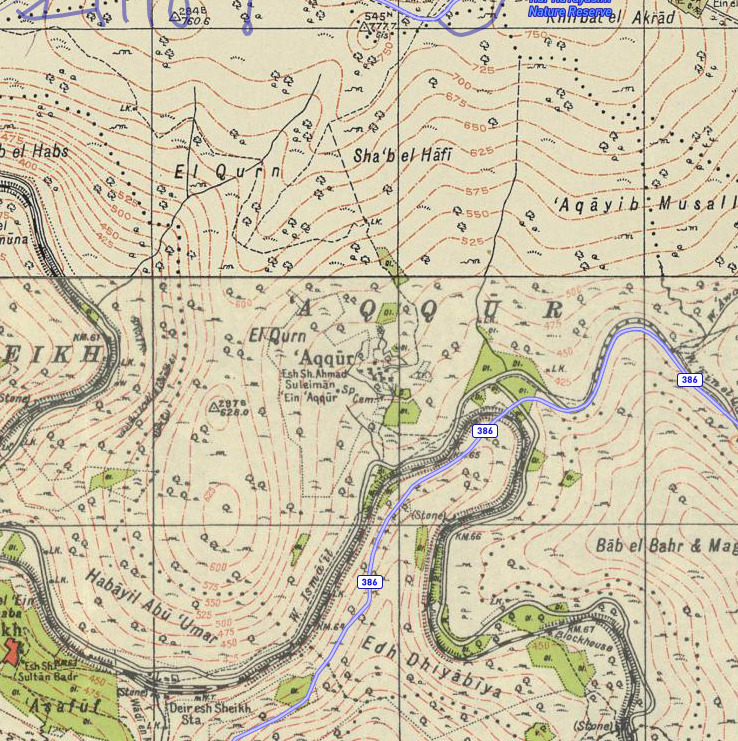
- 1870s map 1940s map modern map 1940s with modern overlay map A series of historical maps of the area around Aqqur (click the buttons)

- Location within Mandatory Palestine
- Coordinates: 31°45′30″N 35°04′56″E
- Palestine grid: 157/129
- Geopolitical entity: Mandatory Palestine
- Subdistrict: Jerusalem
- Date of depopulation: July 13–14, 1948

Area
  - Total: 5,522 dunams (5.522 km^{2}; 2.132 sq mi)

Population (1945)
  - Total: 40
- Cause(s) of depopulation: Military assault by Yishuv forces

Aqqur was a Palestinian Arab hamlet in the Jerusalem Subdistrict. Founded in the Ottoman period, it had a population of 25 in 1922 and 40 in 1945. It was depopulated during the 1948 Arab-Israeli War on July 13, 1948, under Operation Dani. It was located 14.5 km west of Jerusalem on the Wadi Isma'il, a tributary of the Wadi al-Sarar.

== History ==
Aqqur is not mentioned in 16th century records, and was likely first settled in a later period.

In 1838, in the Ottoman era, Akur was noted as a Muslim village, in the el-Arkub district, southwest of Jerusalem. In 1856 the village noted by the same name on Kiepert's map of Palestine published that year.

In 1863, Victor Guérin found here a village with 200 inhabitants. He further noted that several of the houses contained some stones from an old church, then totally destroyed, but whose location still retained among the inhabitants the name of Kniseh (church). A well, which passed for antiquity although it was badly constructed, was sufficient to all the needs of this small locality.

An Ottoman village list of about 1870 showed that Aqqur had 38 houses and a population of 140, though the population count included men, only.

In 1883, the PEF's Survey of Western Palestine described Akur: "A small village on the ledge of the ridge, surrounded by very rugged ground. There is a good spring on the north east, about a mile from the village, on the same ridge."

In 1896 the population of 'Akur was estimated to be about 132 persons.

=== British Mandate era ===
In the 1922 census of Palestine, conducted by the British Mandate authorities, Aqur had a population 25, all Muslims, while in the 1931 census, it was counted with Ras Abu 'Ammar and Ein Hubin, and together they had a population of 488 Muslims, in 106 houses.

A British anthropologist, writing in 1932, reported that there was a group of Sidr trees north east of the village believed to be protected by spirits.

In the 1945 statistics, it had a population of 40 Muslims, with a total of 5,522 dunums of land. Of this, 174 dunams were used for irrigable land or plantations, 653 for cereals, while 5 dunams were built-up land.

'Aqqur had a maqam for a local sage known as al-Shaykh Ahmad Sulayman.

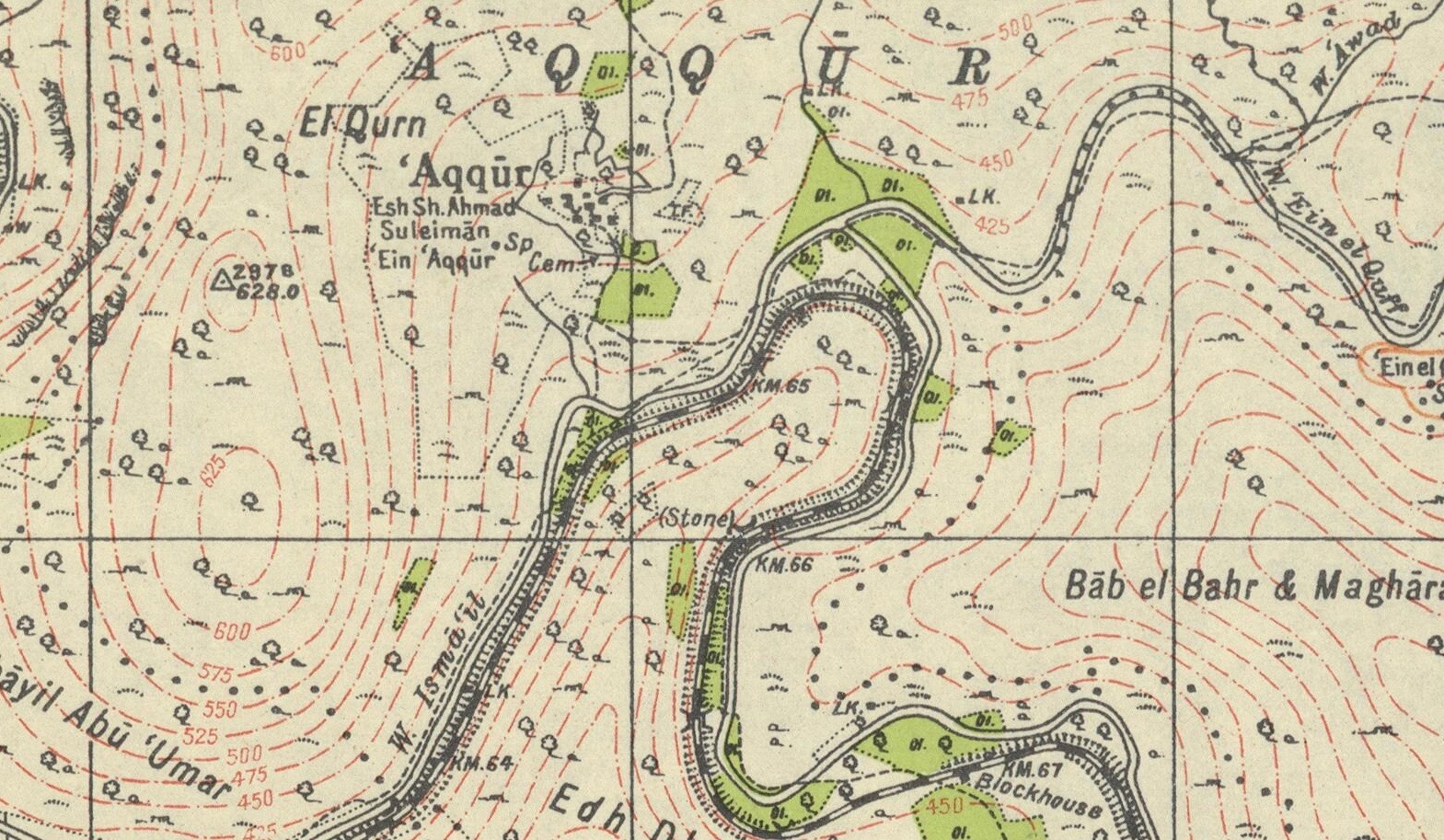
Aqqur, Mandate survey, 1:20,000

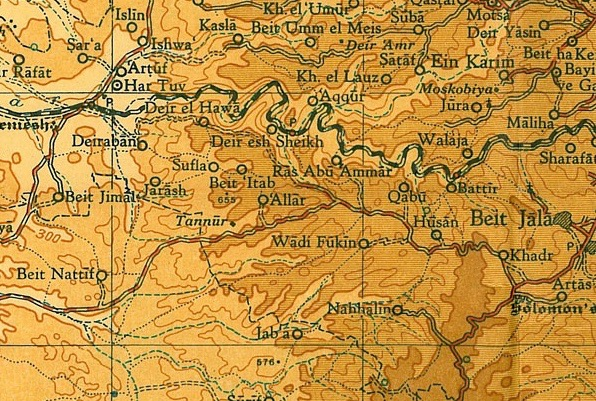
Aqqur, 1945, 1:20,000

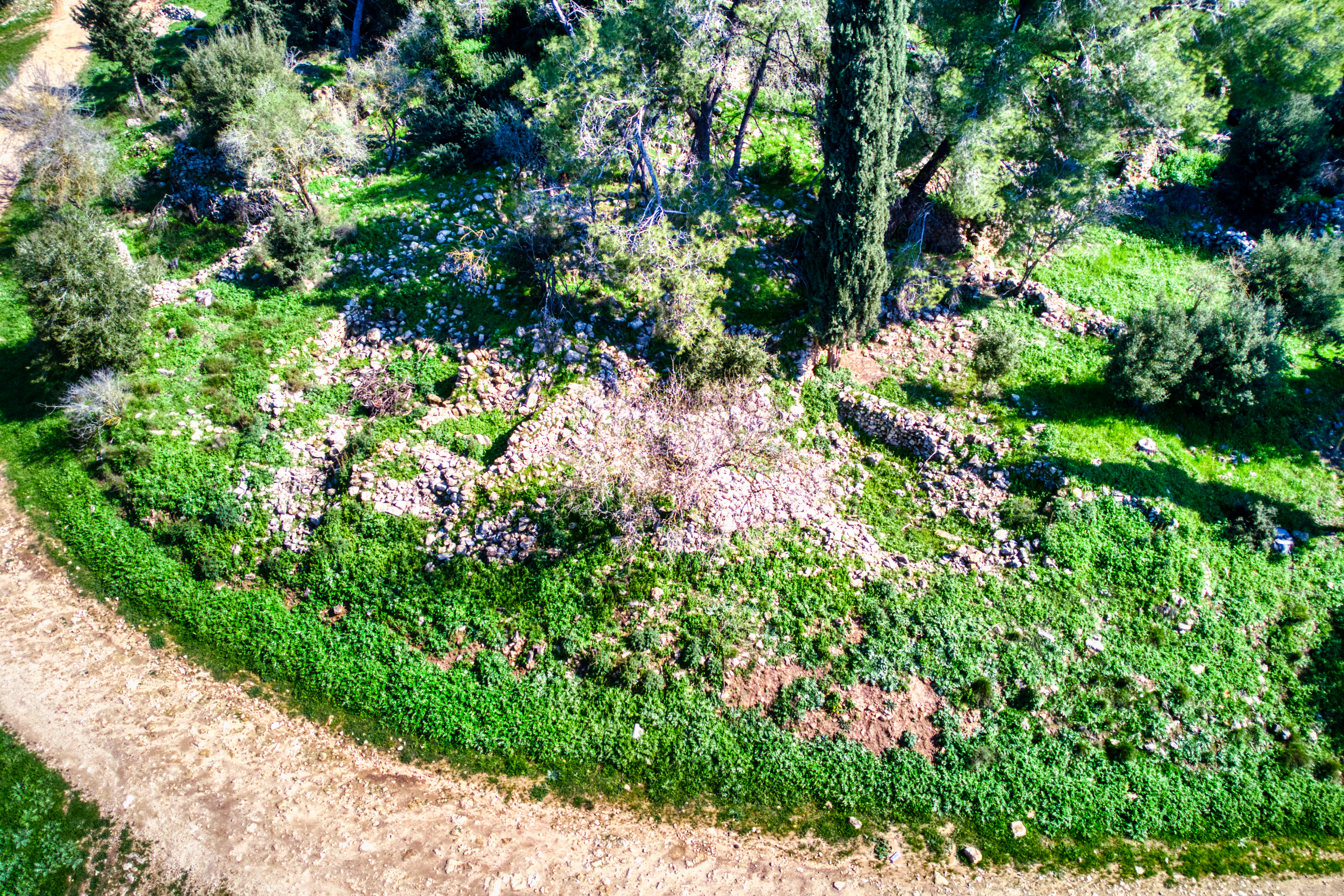
Aqqur remains, 2023

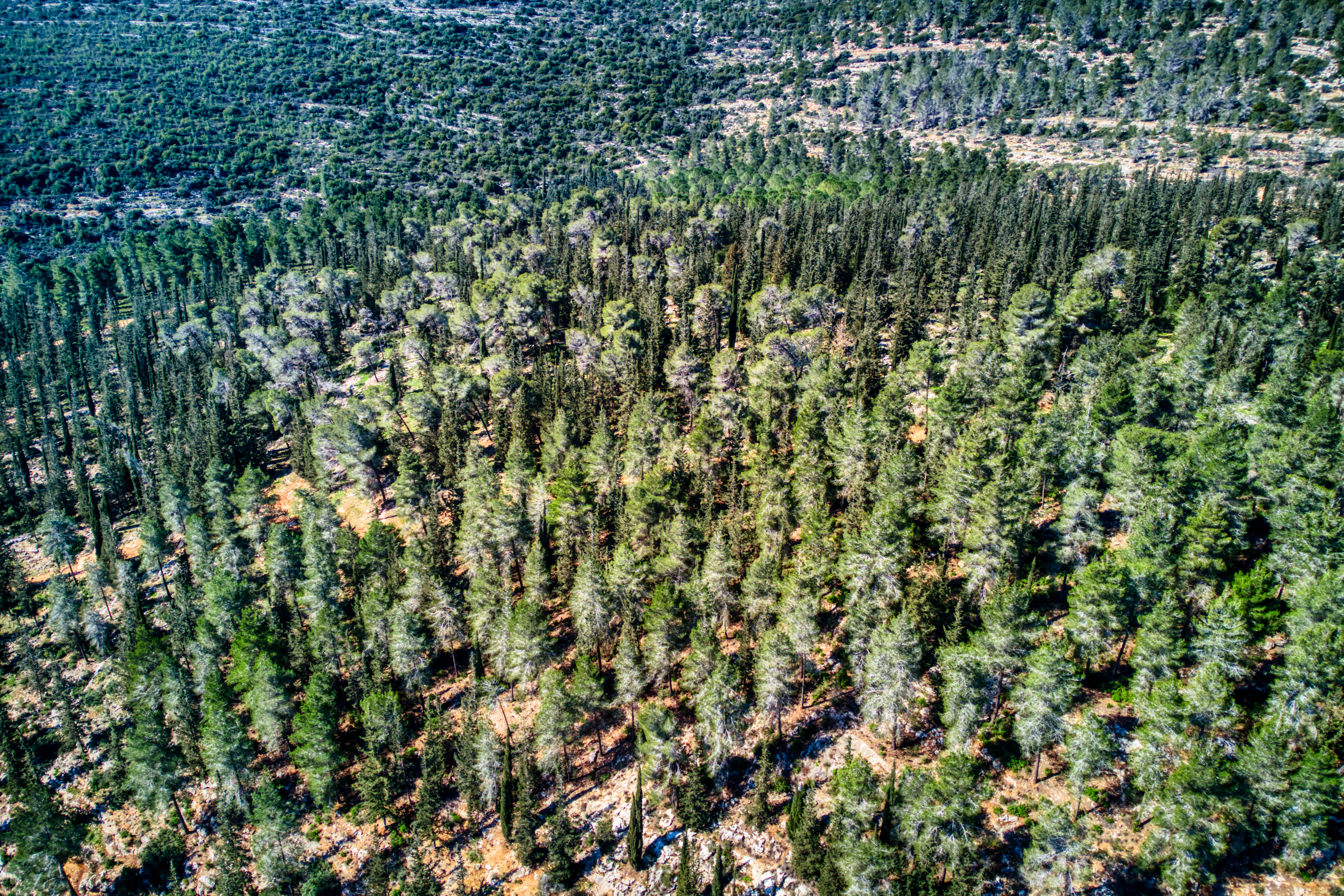
The forest planted on Aqqur remains, 2023

=== 1948, aftermath ===
The village was depopulated July 13–14, 1948 by Harel Brigade units. There had been fighting around the village since April, and many people had fled. Those who remained were expelled.

== Bibliography ==
- Barron, J. B., ed. (1923). Palestine: Report and General Abstracts of the Census of 1922. Government of Palestine.
- Conder, C.R.; Kitchener, H. H. (1883). The Survey of Western Palestine: Memoirs of the Topography, Orography, Hydrography, and Archaeology. Vol. 3. London: Committee of the Palestine Exploration Fund.
- Department of Statistics (1945). Village Statistics, April, 1945. Government of Palestine.
- Guérin, V. (1869). Description Géographique Historique et Archéologique de la Palestine (in French). Vol. 1: Judee, pt. 2. Paris: L'Imprimerie Nationale.
- Hadawi, S. (1970). Village Statistics of 1945: A Classification of Land and Area ownership in Palestine. Palestine Liberation Organization Research Center.
- Hartmann, M. (1883). "Die Ortschaftenliste des Liwa Jerusalem in dem türkischen Staatskalender für Syrien auf das Jahr 1288 der Flucht (1871)". Zeitschrift des Deutschen Palästina-Vereins. 6: 102–149.
- Khalidi, W. (1992). All That Remains: The Palestinian Villages Occupied and Depopulated by Israel in 1948. Washington D.C.: Institute for Palestine Studies. ISBN 0-88728-224-5.
- Mills, E., ed. (1932). Census of Palestine 1931. Population of Villages, Towns and Administrative Areas. Jerusalem: Government of Palestine.
- Morris, B. (2004). The Birth of the Palestinian Refugee Problem Revisited. Cambridge University Press. ISBN 978-0-521-00967-6.
- Palmer, E. H. (1881). The Survey of Western Palestine: Arabic and English Name Lists Collected During the Survey by Lieutenants Conder and Kitchener, R. E. Transliterated and Explained by E.H. Palmer. Committee of the Palestine Exploration Fund.
- Robinson, E.; Smith, E. (1841). Biblical Researches in Palestine, Mount Sinai and Arabia Petraea: A Journal of Travels in the year 1838. Vol. 3. Boston: Crocker & Brewster.
- Schick, C. (1896). "Zur Einwohnerzahl des Bezirks Jerusalem". Zeitschrift des Deutschen Palästina-Vereins. 19: 120–127.
- Socin, A. (1879). "Alphabetisches Verzeichniss von Ortschaften des Paschalik Jerusalem". Zeitschrift des Deutschen Palästina-Vereins. 2: 135–163.
