= Heinrich Kiepert =

German geographer (1818–1899)

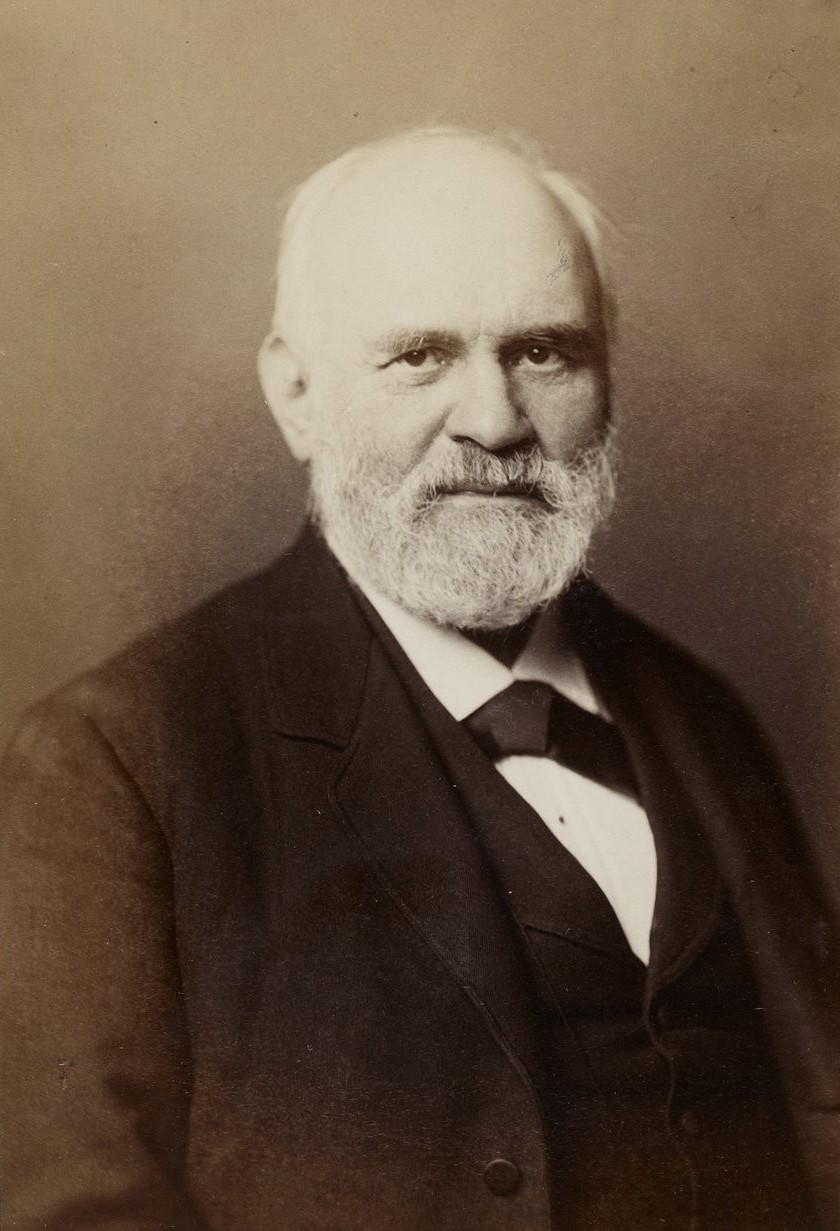
Heinrich Kiepert

Heinrich Kiepert (July 31, 1818 – April 21, 1899) was a German geographer.

== Early life and education ==
Kiepert was born in Berlin. He traveled frequently as a youth with his family and documented his travels by drawing. His family was friends with Leopold von Ranke, who inspired Kiepert's creative endeavors. Kiepert was taught by August Meineke in school. Meineke influenced Kiepert's interest in classical antiquity. He attended Humboldt University of Berlin. He studied history, philology, and geography.

== Cartography career ==
"New General Map of the Asian/Eastern Provinces of the Ottoman Empire: Without Arabia" by Heinrich Kiepert

He published his first geographical work, with Carl Ritter, in 1840, titled Atlas von Hellas und den hellenischen Kolonien. The atlas focused on ancient Greece. In 1841, he drew the maps which appeared in a groundbreaking book on the Mideast, Biblical Researches in Palestine, written by Edward Robinson. In 1848 his Historisch-geographischer Atlas der alten Welt was published. In 1854, his atlas, Atlas antiquus was released. It was translated into five languages. Neuer Handatlas über alle Teile der Erde was first published in 1855. In 1877 his Lehrbuch der alten Geographie was published, and in 1879 Leitfaden der alten Geographie, which was translated into English (A Manual of Ancient Geography, 1881) and into French. In 1894 he created the first part of a larger atlas of the ancient world titled Formae orbis antiqui. He traveled to Asia Minor four times between 1841 and 1848. He created two maps of the region, including Karte des osmanischen Reiches in Asien, in 1844. Furthermore, he made some maps for the Baedeker publishing, mainly for their Egypt and Palestine outstanding guides but also for some of Europe (Paris, London, South Italy, etc.): Italie du Sud et la Sicile. Avec excursions aux îles de Lipari, à Tunis, à Malte, en Sardaigne et à Athènes (3rd ed., 1872), London nebst Ausflügen nach Süd-England, Wales u. Schottland, sowie Reiserouten vom Continent nach England (5th ed., 1875); and Paris ses environs et les principaux itinéraires des pays limitrophes à Paris (3rd ed., 1874).

Kiepert taught geography at the University of Humboldt-Berlin starting in 1854. He taught at the university until his death.

== Death and legacy ==
He died in Berlin on April 21, 1899. His son, cartographer Richard Kiepert published remaining works by Kiepert after his death, including a map of Asia Minor in 24 sheets on a scale of 1:400,000 in 1902. He also managed the reissuing of Formae orbis antiqui. Kiepert Island is named after Kiepert.

== Works ==
- Albert Houtum-Schindler; Heinrich Kiepert (1881), "Reisen im Südlichen Persien 1879", Zeitschrift der Gesellschaft für Erdkunde zu Berlin (in German), vol. 16, Dietrich Reimer Verlag, pp. 307–366

== Bibliography ==
- J. Partsch "Heinrich Kiepert, ein Bild seines Lebens und seiner Arbeit," in Geographische Zeitschrift, volume vii (Leipzig, 1901)
