= Edward Dorr Griffin Prime =

American journalist (1814–1891)

Edward Dorr Griffin Prime (2 November 1814– 17 April 1891) was an American clergyman and journalist.

Prime was one of seven children of Nathaniel Scudder Prime and Julia Ann Jermain; his brother was Samuel Irenæus Prime. His grandfather was the writer Benjamin Prime.

He was born at Cambridge, N. Y., and graduated from Union College in 1832. He taught for a few years before studying medicine and theology. He graduated from Princeton Theological Seminary in 1838 and had pastorates at Scotchtown, N. Y. and New York City. In 1853 he became substitute editor of the New York Observer, while his brother Samuel was in Europe. Afterward the two were associated until 1885. Edward Prime continued to edit the paper for a year after his brother's death. He traveled much abroad, spent the winter of 1854–1855 in Rome, and made a journey round the world in 1869–1870 to study religious conditions in Eastern countries.

He published several books, including his father-in-law’s biography.

== Family ==
Prime was married twice. In 1839 he married Maria Wilson; after her death, he married Abigail Goodell in 1860.

He is named after, but not related to, theologian Edward Dorr Griffin.

== Publications ==
His works include;

- Around the World (1872)
- Civil and Religious Liberty in Turkey (1875)
- Forty Years in the Turkish Empire; or Memoirs of Rev. William Goodell (1876)
- Notes ... of the Prime Family (1888)
