= Ebenezer Prime =

American Presbyterian minister (1700–1779)

Ebenezer Prime (21 July 1700 – 25 September 1779) was an American clergyman.

Ebenezer Prime was the son of James and Sarah (née Hitchock) Prime, born in Milford, Connecticut. Prime was the descendant of religious refugees from England. He graduated from Yale in 1718 and the following year relocated to Huntington in Suffolk County, New York to become assistant to a Reverend there. Prime married three times: Margaret Sylvester in 1723, Experience Youngs in 1730, and Hannah Platt in 1752. Together with Margaret, he fathered Ebenezer Prime and Margaret (Prime) Brown. With Experience Youngs, he fathered Mary (Prime) Wood, Sarah Prime, Ebenezer Prime and Benjamin Youngs Prime.

His son Benjamin Youngs Prime (1733–1791) was a physician, linguist and patriot poet, and the grandfather of Samuel Irenaeus Prime (1812–1885) editor of the New York Observer.

He became pastor of the First Presbyterian Church church in 1723 and would occupy this position for the rest of his life, giving over 3,000 sermons. As Reverend, he published multiple discourses and a sermon, oftentimes embracing peculiar views. Despite his Congregationalist education, Prime joined the other churches of Suffolk County in making the switch to Presbyterianism, becoming the moderator of the newly formed Presbytery. He was elected as a member of the American Philosophical Society in 1769.

When the Revolutionary War broke out, the British ravaged Prime's church, using it as a military depot and burning the pulpit, pews, and even Prime's library for fuel. Thereby expelled from his home church, he spent the rest of his life preaching in private residences in his parish. Dying before the war ended, Prime was buried in his parish, and upon its occupation by the British, an Imperial Colonel requested his tent be pitched on top of Prime's grave so as to take joy in treading upon the “damned old rebel.”

He is buried at the Old Burying Hill Cemetery in Huntington, Suffolk County.
