= William Cowper Prime =

American art historian (1825–1905)

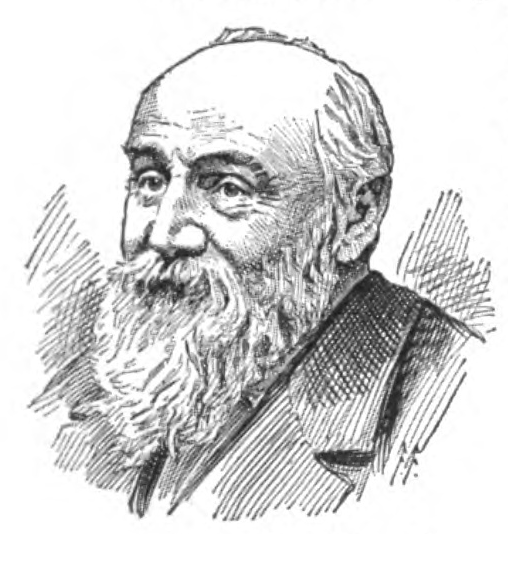
- Born: October 31, 1825; Cambridge, New York, U.S.
- Died: February 12, 1905 (aged 79); New York City, U.S.
- Education: Princeton University (1843)
- Occupations: Journalist, art historian, numismatist, attorney, travel writer
- Spouse: Mary Trumbull (m. 1851)
- Writing career
- Language: English
- Notable work: Tent Life in the Holy Land

William Cowper Prime (October 31, 1825 – February 12, 1905) was an American journalist, art historian, numismatist, attorney, and travel writer.

== Early life ==
William Prime was the younger brother of S. I. Prime and E. D. G. Prime, born at Cambridge, New York on October 31, 1825. He graduated Princeton in 1843 and delivered a poem at commencement. He was admitted to the New York Bar in 1846 and began to practice law in New York City. On May 1, 1851, he married Mary Trumbull of Stonington, Connecticut.

== Career ==
During 1855 and 1856, Prime traveled in Europe, North Africa, and the Holy Land with his wife Mary, her brother James and his wife Sarah. He published Boat Life in Egypt and Nubia and Tent Life in the Holy Land based on his experiences there, which include his accounts of the Church of the Holy Sepulchre, the Dead Sea, and the port of Jaffa, among others. During their trip up the Nile river, his wife kept an extensive, detailed diary that was discovered, then published, in 1998 by Charles Derowitch, entitled "Nile Journeys". In The Innocents Abroad, Mark Twain parodies Tent Life in the Holy Land as "Grime's" Nomadic Life in Palestine, taking aim at Prime's overly sentimental prose and his violent encounters with the local inhabitants. Twain makes the contemporary popularity of Tent Life evident in his parody: "Some of us will be shot before we finish this pilgrimage. The pilgrims read 'Nomadic Life' and keep themselves in a constant state of Quixotic heroism." Twain speculates that if a homicide did occur, Grimes should be prosecuted as an "accessory before the fact."

Prime continued practicing law until 1861, when he became part owner and editor-in-chief of the New York Journal of Commerce. In 1869 he gave up his editorial work and revisited Egypt and the Holy Land. It was at his insistence that Princeton established a department of art history, to which he donated his extensive collection of ceramic art. In 1884, the Trustees of the college elected Prime as the department's first chair. His interest in art matters brought him into close connection with the Metropolitan Museum of Art in New York, of which he was elected first vice-president in 1874.

Based on information obtained from a surveyors map of 1898, WC Prime co-owned (with William Frederick Bridge) roughly 650 acres of land encompassing 12.2 acre Lonesome Lake in the Franconia Range of the White Mountains. The two men developed the land with remote hunting cabins that were primarily used in summer; Prime was a keen fisherman. Ice was harvested from the lake by local workers to be stored in the ice shed for use over the summer months. The property was co-owned by the two men from the mid-1800s to 1898 when the property was sold to the Profile & Flume Hotel company.

Prime died at his home in New York City on February 13, 1905.

== Bibliography ==
His published writings include:

- The Owl-Creek Letters and Other Correspondences (1848)
- The Old House by the River (1853)
- Later Years (1854)
- Boat Life in Egypt and Nubia (1857)
- Tent Life in the Holy Land (1857)
- Coins, Medals, and Seals, Ancient and Modern (1861)
- O Mother dear, Jerusalem: The Old Hymn, its Origin and Genealogy (1865)
- I Go A Fishing (1873)
- Holy Cross: A History of the Invention, Preservation, and Disappearance of the Wood Known as the True Cross (1877)
- Pottery and Porcelain of all Times and Nations (1878)
- Along New England Roads (1892)
- Among the Northern Hills (1893)

Prime provided an introduction to the English-language version of Théophile Gautier's Romance of the Mummy (1863). In 1886, as literary executor of General George B. McClellan, Prime edited "McClellan's Own Story", which included a biographical sketch written by Prime.
