= Ras Abu 'Ammar =

Ras Abu 'Ammar رأس أبو عمار
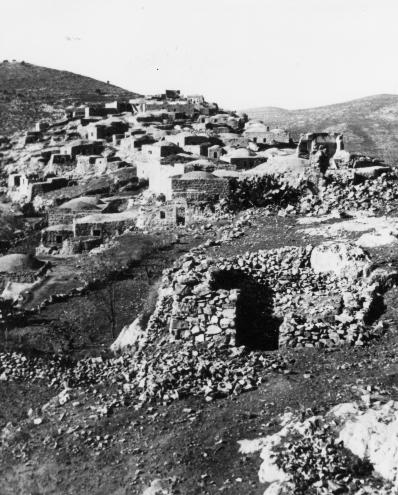
- Ras Abu 'Ammar 1948
- Etymology: The hill top of Abu Ammar
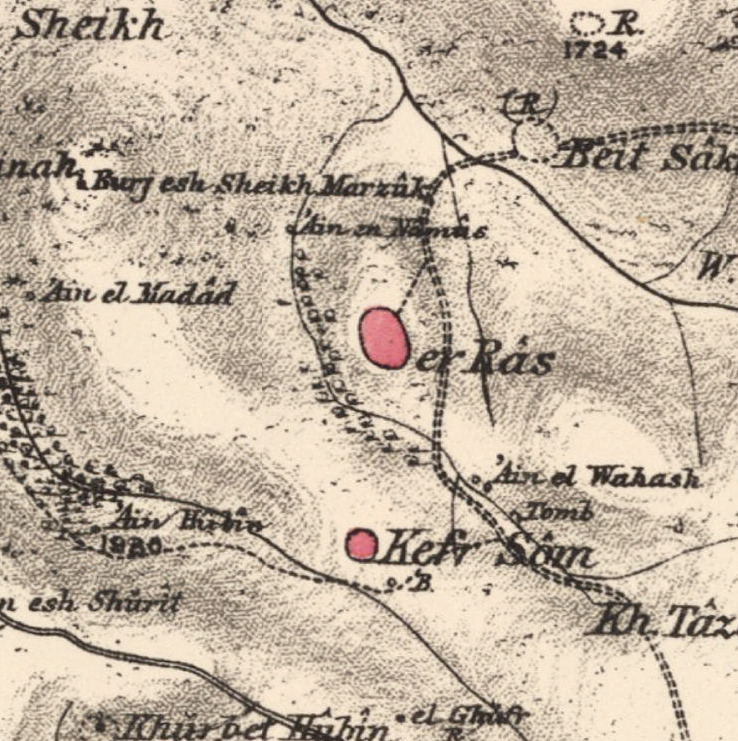
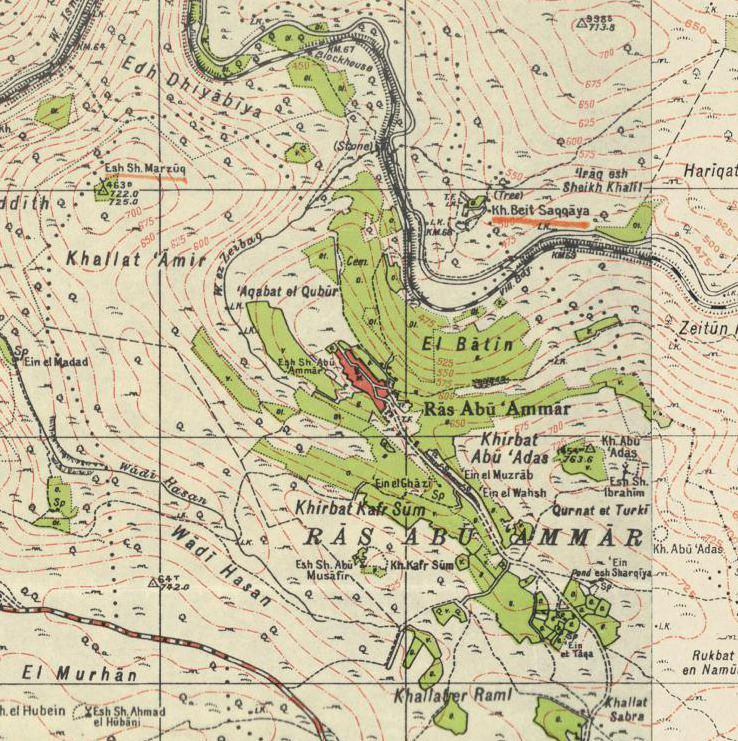
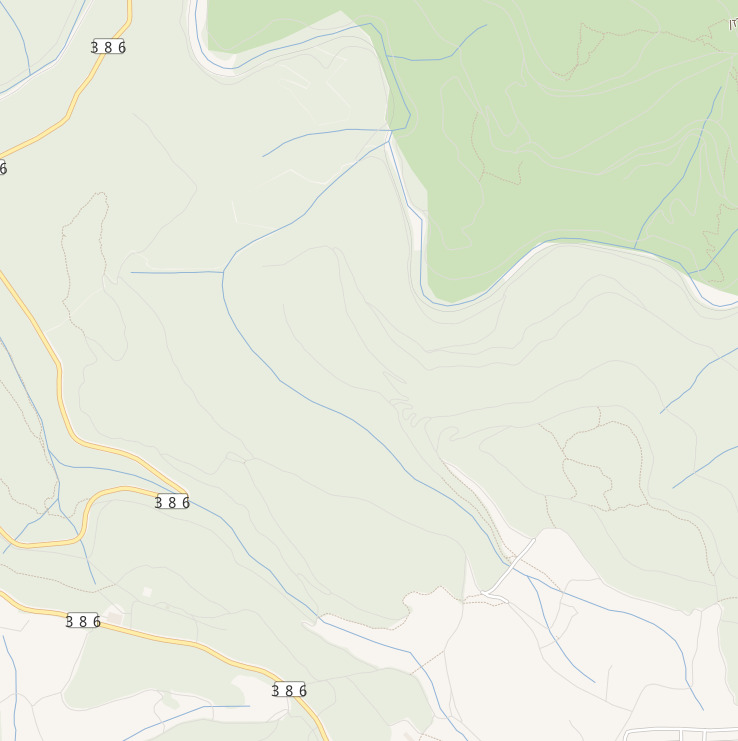
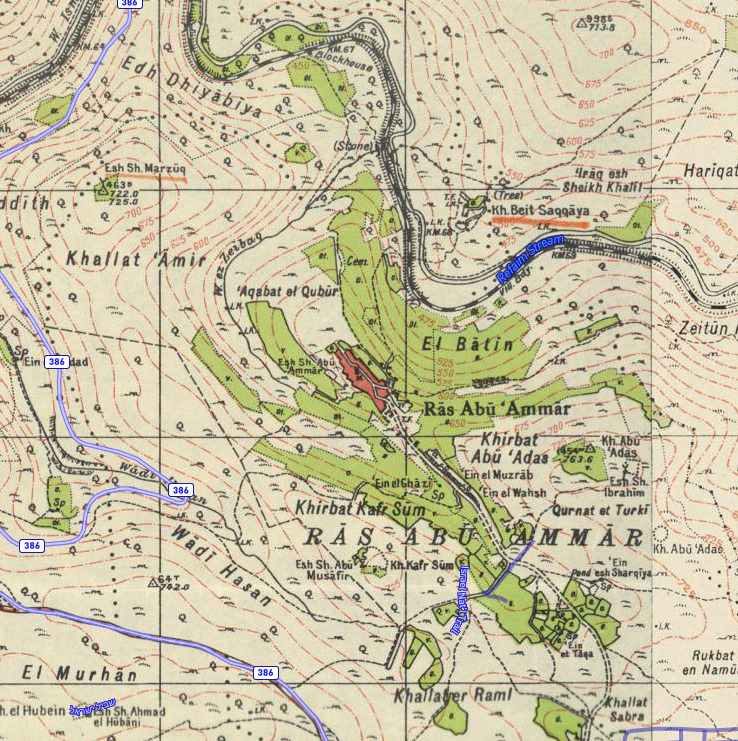
- 1870s map 1940s map modern map 1940s with modern overlay map A series of historical maps of the area around Ras Abu 'Ammar (click the buttons)

- Location within Mandatory Palestine
- Coordinates: 31°44′17″N 35°05′33″E
- Palestine grid: 158/127
- Geopolitical entity: Mandatory Palestine
- Subdistrict: Jerusalem
- Date of depopulation: October 21, 1948

Area
  - Total: 8,342 dunams (8.342 km^{2}; 3.221 sq mi)

Population (1945)
  - Total: 620
- Cause(s) of depopulation: Military assault by Yishuv forces
- Current Localities: Tzur Hadassah

Ras Abu 'Ammar (Arabic: رأس أبو عمار) was a small Palestinian Arab village in the Jerusalem Subdistrict. It was depopulated during the 1948 Arab-Israeli War on October 21, 1948, by the Har'el Brigade of Operation ha-Har. It was located 14 km west of Jerusalem, surrounded on three sides by the Wadi al-Sarar.

== History ==
Ras Abu 'Ammar is thought to have been established in the 19th century.

The nearby Kh. Kafr Sum have remains from the Crusader era, including a court-yard building and rock-cut cisterns. A tower to the south east was later turned into Maqam ash-sheikh Musafar. Victor Guérin noted that: "There are a lot of rickety houses, which are built of small, almost unhewn stones, near one waly, which stands in the shade of a mulberry tree of several hundreds years old. Not far from it there is a semicircle swimming pool, built in a crude way". And further: "A large structure, partly built of ancient stones with typical projection, served as a mosque, as we can tell from the presence of the mihrab in it. It is very likely that the structure had stood before the Muslims settled here, and they just adopted it for their cult".

The SWP described it as "a small stone village on a hill; to the east in a small valley is a good spring, with a rock-cut tomb beside it".

=== Ottoman era ===
In 1838, both et-Ras and Kefr Sur were noted as villages in the el-Arkub district, southwest of Jerusalem.

In 1863 Victor Guérin was pointed out on a mountain the small village of Ras Abu 'Ammar, which high position had given its name.

An Ottoman village list from around 1870 showed that Ras Abu Ammar had 6 (?) houses and a population of 92, though the population count only included men.

In 1883, the PEF's Survey of Western Palestine (SWP) described Ras (Abu 'Ammar) as "a large stone village on a spur, with a fine spring in the valley to the north-west. The hill has only a little scrub on it, but the valley, which is open and rather flat, has olives in it."

In 1896 the population of Ras Abu 'Ammar was estimated to be about 279 persons.

=== British Mandate era ===
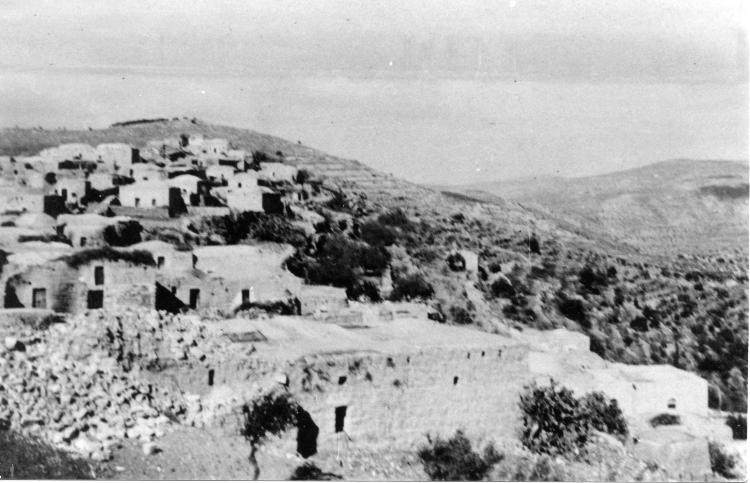
Ras Abu 'Ammar 1948

In the 1922 census of Palestine conducted by the British Mandate authorities, Ras Abu Ammar had a population 339, all Muslims, increasing in the 1931 census when it was counted with Aqqur and Ein Hubin, to 488, in 106 houses.

In the 1945 statistics, the village, with a population of 620 Muslims, had 8,342 dunams of land according to an official land and population survey. Of the land, 925 dunams were plantations and irrigable land 2,791 were for cereals, while 40 dunams were built-up (urban) land.

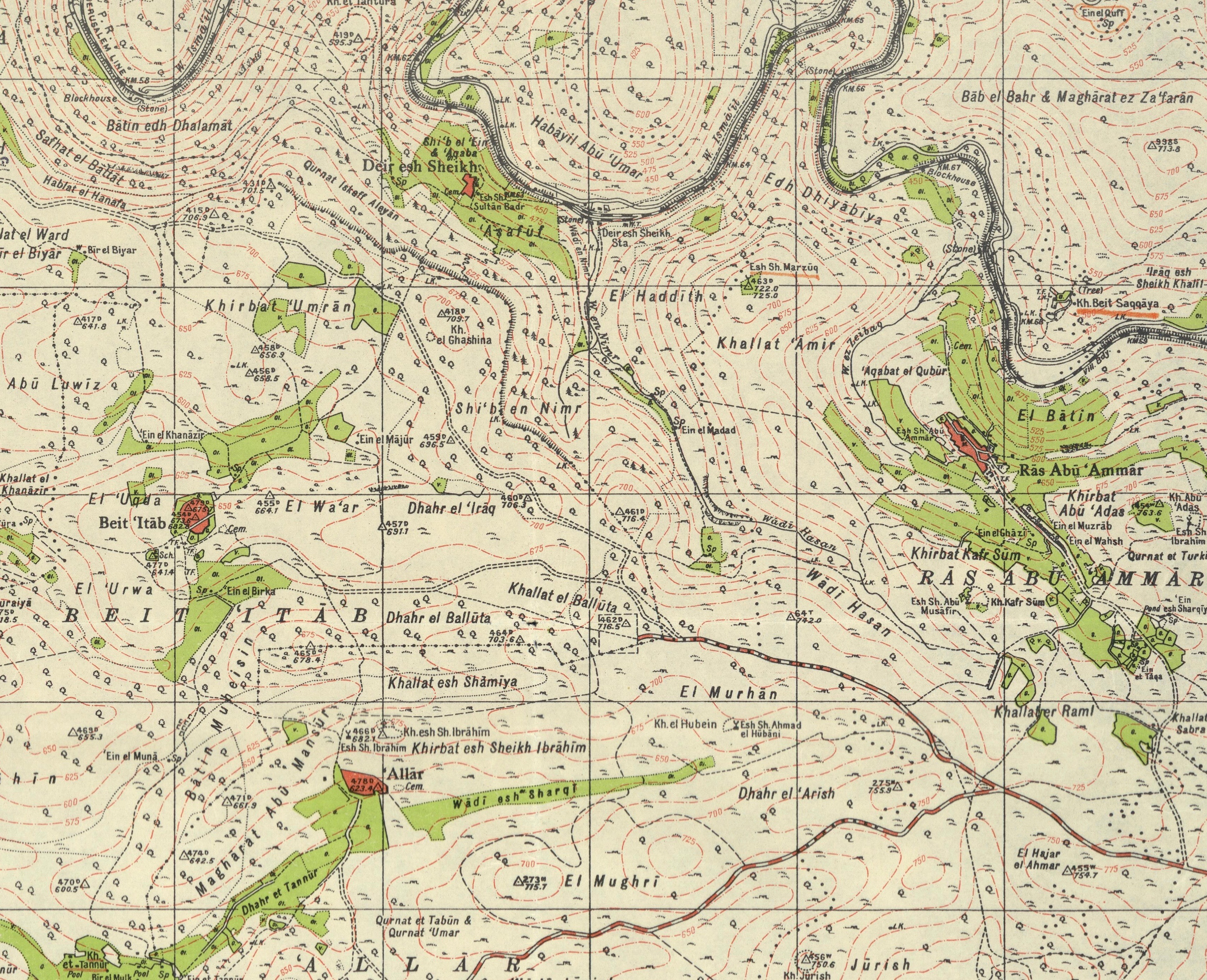
Ras Abu 'Ammar, Mandate survey, 1:20,000

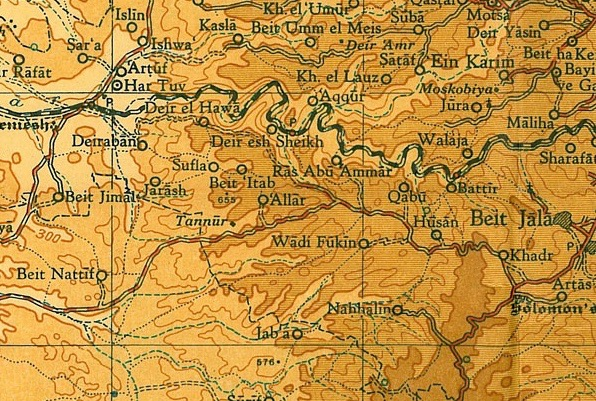
Ras Abu 'Ammar, 1945, 1:20,000

=== 1948 and aftermath ===
On 4 August, 1948, two weeks into the Second truce of the 1948 Arab–Israeli War, Grand Mufti of Jerusalem and Palestinian nationalist Amin al Husseini noted that ‘for two weeks now . . . the Jews have continued with their attacks on the Arab villages and outposts in all areas. Stormy battles are continuing in the villages of Sataf, Deiraban, Beit Jimal, Ras Abu ‘Amr, ‘Aqqur, and ‘Artuf . . .’

The village was depopulated on October 21, 1948. The area was later incorporated into the State of Israel and the village of Tzur Hadassah was established on Ras Abu 'Ammar land in 1960.

In 1992 the village site was described: "The stone rubble of the village houses is strewn across the site. Wild vegetation grows among the debris, in addition to almond, olive, and carob trees. Cactuses grow on the southeastern and southwestern sides of the site; a two-room stone building that used to be the schoolhouse still stands to the southeast."

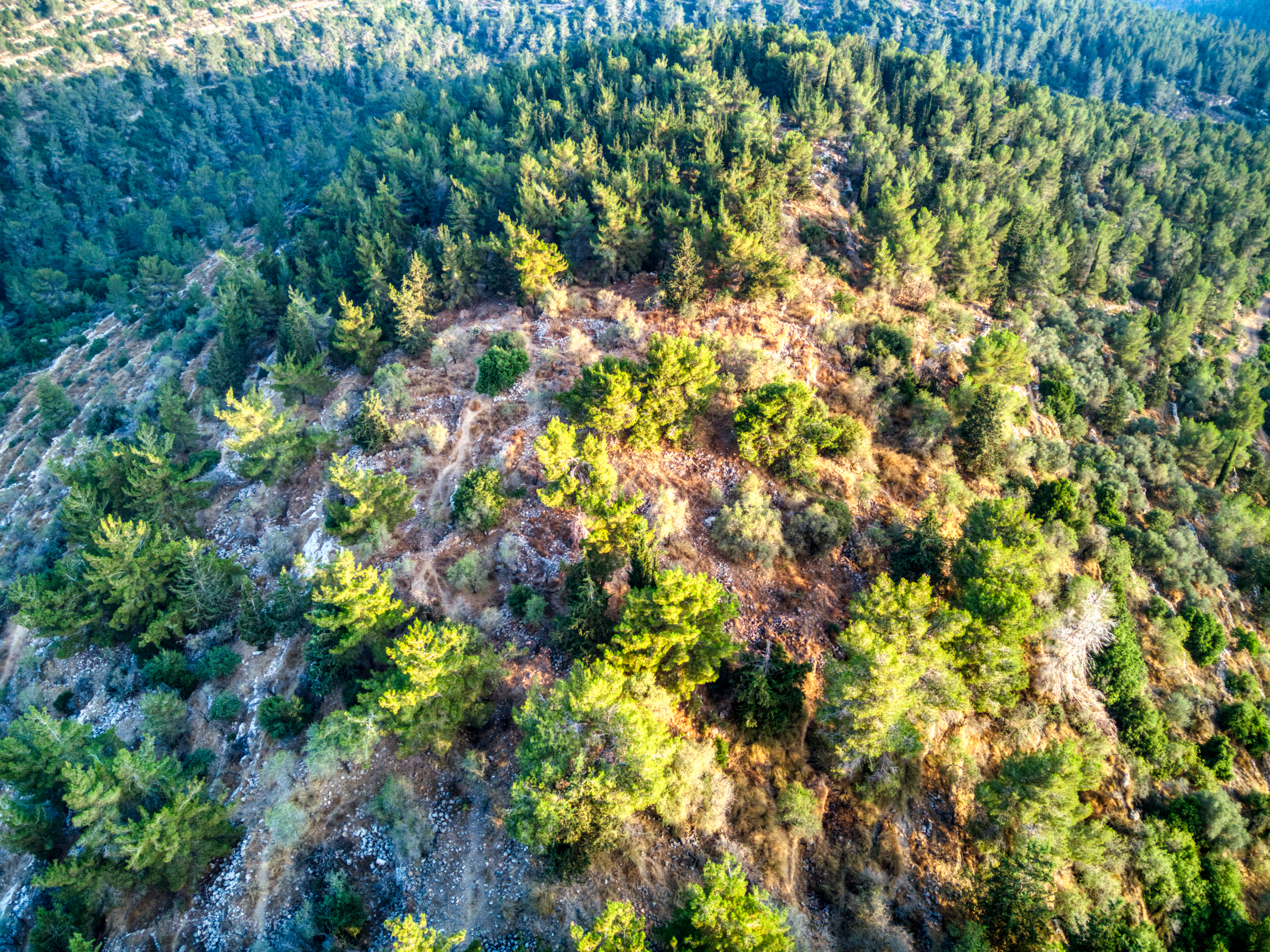
Ras Abu 'Ammar, 2023

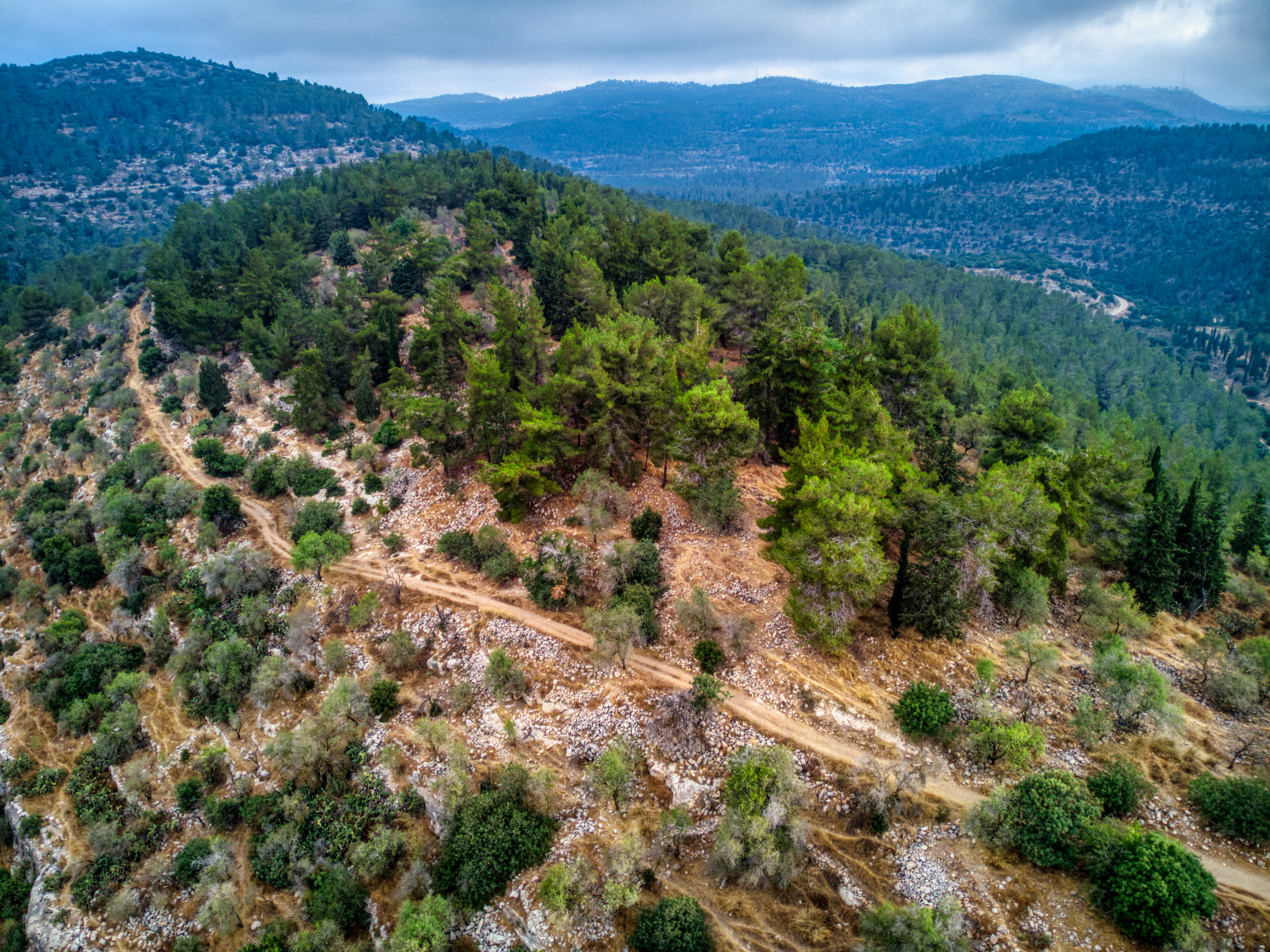
Ras Abu 'Ammar, 2023

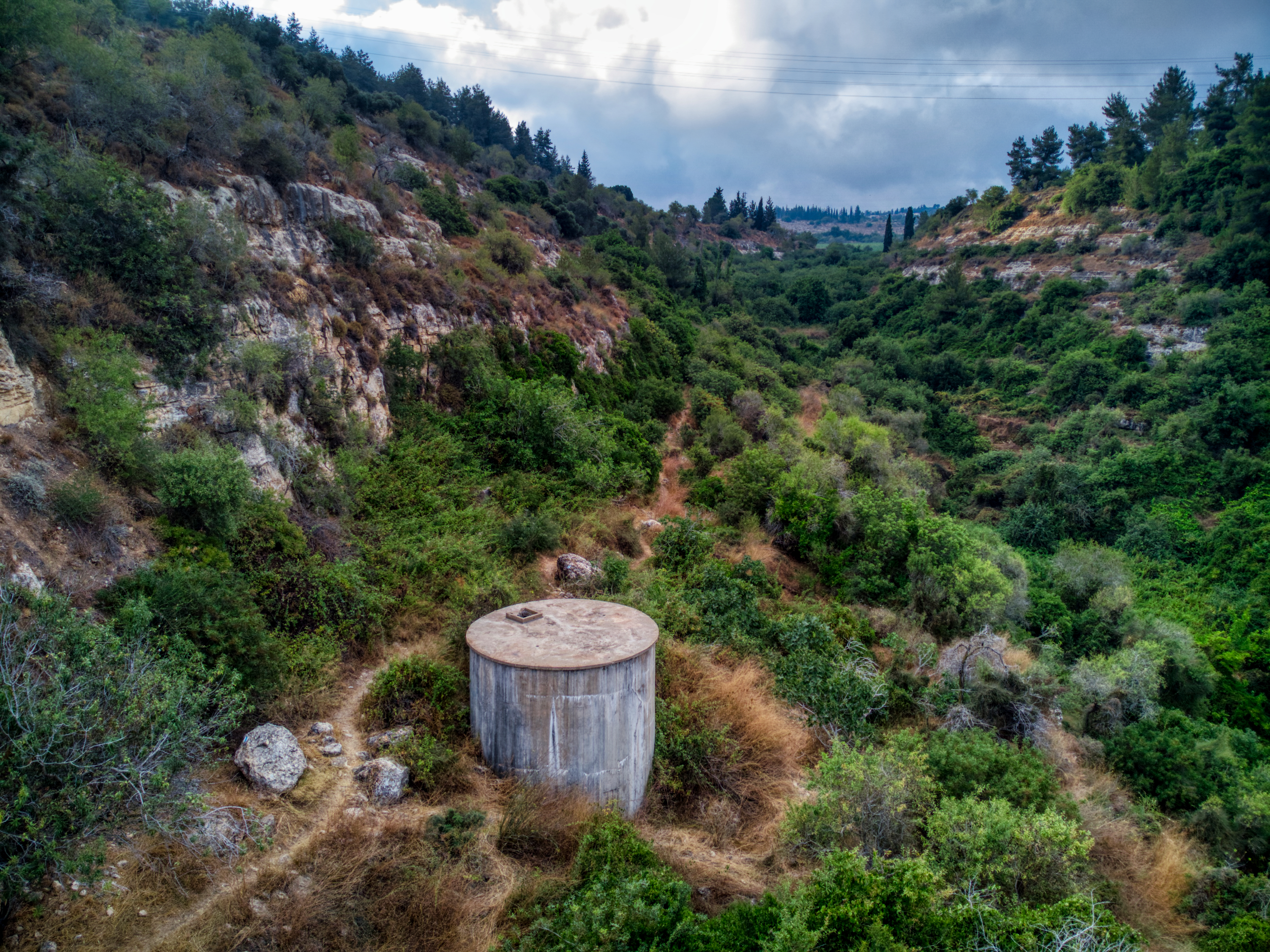
Ein Abu 'Ammar, 2023

== Bibliography ==
- Barron, J.B., ed. (1923). Palestine: Report and General Abstracts of the Census of 1922. Government of Palestine.
- Conder, C.R.; Kitchener, H.H. (1883). The Survey of Western Palestine: Memoirs of the Topography, Orography, Hydrography, and Archaeology. Vol. 3. London: Committee of the Palestine Exploration Fund.
- Department of Statistics (1945). Village Statistics, April, 1945. Government of Palestine.
- Guérin, V. (1869). Description Géographique Historique et Archéologique de la Palestine (in French). Vol. 1: Judee, pt. 2. Paris: L'Imprimerie Nationale.
- Hadawi, S. (1970). Village Statistics of 1945: A Classification of Land and Area ownership in Palestine. Palestine Liberation Organization Research Center.
- Hartmann, M. (1883). "Die Ortschaftenliste des Liwa Jerusalem in dem türkischen Staatskalender für Syrien auf das Jahr 1288 der Flucht (1871)". Zeitschrift des Deutschen Palästina-Vereins. 6: 102–149.
- Hütteroth, W.-D.; Abdulfattah, K. (1977). Historical Geography of Palestine, Transjordan and Southern Syria in the Late 16th Century. Erlanger Geographische Arbeiten, Sonderband 5. Erlangen, Germany: Vorstand der Fränkischen Geographischen Gesellschaft. ISBN 3-920405-41-2.(p. 153: nearby Kafr Sum)
- Khalidi, W. (1992). All That Remains: The Palestinian Villages Occupied and Depopulated by Israel in 1948. Washington D.C.: Institute for Palestine Studies. ISBN 0-88728-224-5.
- Mills, E., ed. (1932). Census of Palestine 1931. Population of Villages, Towns and Administrative Areas. Jerusalem: Government of Palestine.
- Morris, B. (2004). The Birth of the Palestinian Refugee Problem Revisited. Cambridge University Press. ISBN 978-0-521-00967-6.
- Palmer, E.H. (1881). The Survey of Western Palestine: Arabic and English Name Lists Collected During the Survey by Lieutenants Conder and Kitchener, R. E. Transliterated and Explained by E.H. Palmer. Committee of the Palestine Exploration Fund.
- Petersen, Andrew (2001). A Gazetteer of Buildings in Muslim Palestine (British Academy Monographs in Archaeology). Vol. 1. Oxford University Press. ISBN 978-0-19-727011-0. (p. 195)
- Pringle, D. (1997). Secular buildings in the Crusader Kingdom of Jerusalem: an archaeological Gazetter. Cambridge University Press. ISBN 0521-46010-7.
- Robinson, E.; Smith, E. (1841). Biblical Researches in Palestine, Mount Sinai and Arabia Petraea: A Journal of Travels in the year 1838. Vol. 2. Boston: Crocker & Brewster.
- Robinson, E.; Smith, E. (1841). Biblical Researches in Palestine, Mount Sinai and Arabia Petraea: A Journal of Travels in the year 1838. Vol. 3. Boston: Crocker & Brewster.
- Schick, C. (1896). "Zur Einwohnerzahl des Bezirks Jerusalem". Zeitschrift des Deutschen Palästina-Vereins. 19: 120–127.
- Socin, A. (1879). "Alphabetisches Verzeichniss von Ortschaften des Paschalik Jerusalem". Zeitschrift des Deutschen Palästina-Vereins. 2: 135–163.
