= Kiepert maps of Palestine and Jerusalem =

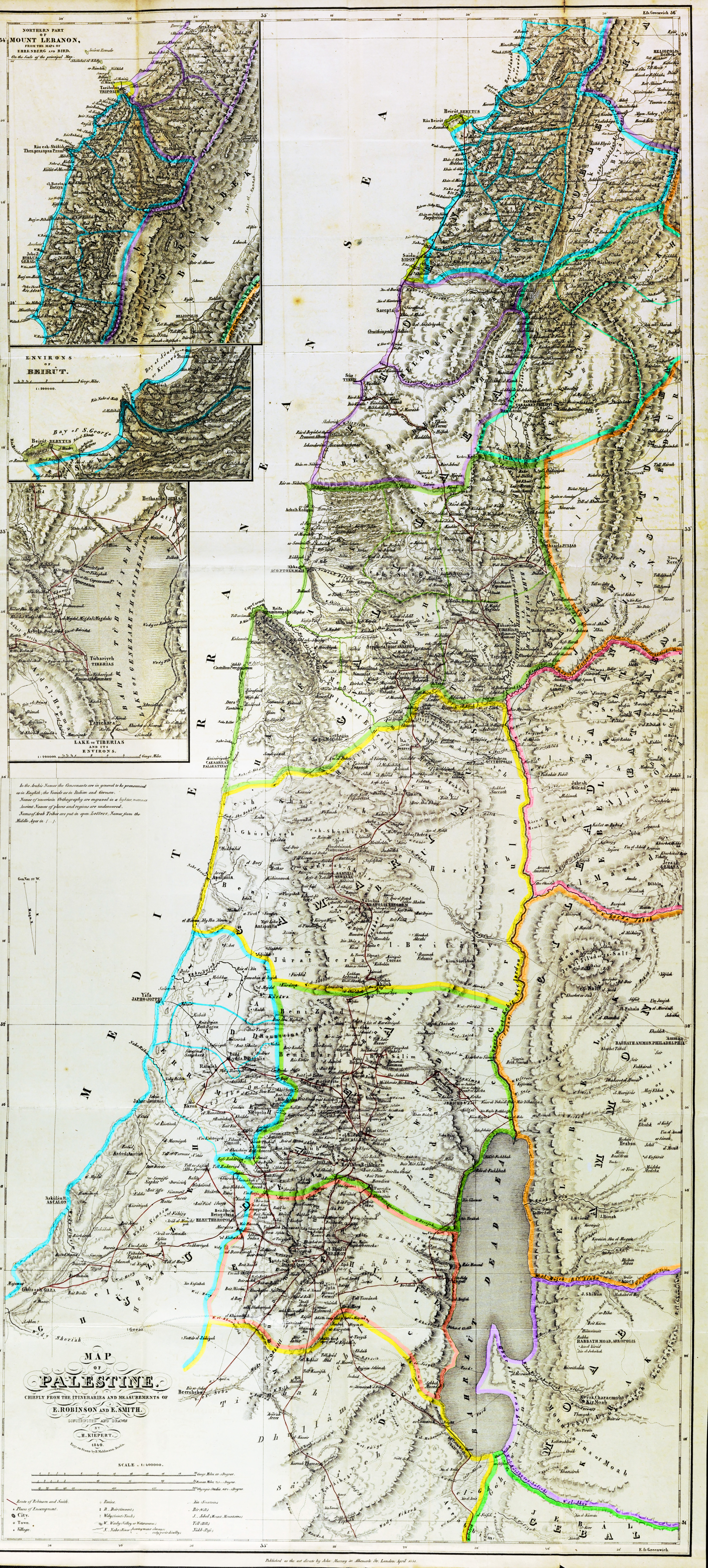
- Composite map of Palestine
- Created: 1840-41
- Author: Heinrich Kiepert

The Kiepert maps of Palestine and Jerusalem were important scientific mappings of the region of Palestine and mappings of Jerusalem, initially published in 1841 by German cartographer Heinrich Kiepert as the maps accompanying Biblical Researches in Palestine, the magnum opus of the "Father of Biblical Geography", Edward Robinson.

In 1907, the maps were used by the World Zionist Congress’s Palastinakommission department as the basis for its own Hebrew Palestine Wall-Map, on to which new Hebrew place names and new Jewish colonies would be added over time.

== Maps ==
=== Palestine ===
The maps of Palestine were first published in 1841 to accompany the first edition of Biblical Researches in Palestine, and published again in 1856 to accompany the second edition. It has been described as the most important element of Robinson's publication: "Perhaps, Robinson’s most important accomplishment, however, was the drawing of new maps of the whole region. For this purpose he hired a young German map maker, Heinrich Kiepert… Through his efforts the maps of ancient Israel were thoroughly revised and improved; modern cartography of the Holy Land begun."

The sources for the map of Palestine were set out by Robinson in the introduction to the first volume of the first edition of his work:

In the parts of the country visited or seen by us, they have been constructed almost solely from our own routes and observations and the information we were able to collect, brought into connection with known and fixed points. The other portions have been supplied from the best authorities, viz. the form and shores of the Gulfs of the Red Sea, from the chart of Capt. Moresby; the country south of Wady Mûsa and parts of Sinai, so far as known, from Laborde, with corrections from Burckhardt and Rüppell, the coast of Palestine as far north as to 'Akka, and the country around Nazareth, from the great map of Jacotin, compiled from surveys made during the French expedition in A. d. 1799; the positions on the coast being corrected from later astronomical observations. The small tract given of the country east of the Jordan, has been reconstructed from the routes and observations of Burckhardt, compared with those of Seetzen, Irby and Mangles, and a few others of less importance. The whole of Mount Lebanon north of Sidon, is drawn from manuscript maps of Prof. Ehrenberg of Berlin and the Rev. Mr. Bird of the American Mission in Syria, kindly communicated to me for that purpose. The map of the former was used by Berghaus; those of the latter have never been brought before the public… In the construction of the maps, it has been a main principle, to admit no name nor position on mere conjecture, nor without some sufficient positive authority. Where a place is known to exist, though its position is not definitely ascertained, it is marked as uncertain. The operation of this principle has been, to exclude a multitude of names, ancient and modern, which figure at random on most maps of Palestine.

In his 1856 Later Biblical Researches in Palestine, he stated that the new information learned on their second journey “rendered necessary a new construction” of the maps.

In additional to their foundational position in Biblical Geography, the maps also are the first which show the detailed subdivisions of contemporary Palestine. Kiepert's explained as follows:

Division into Provinces and Districts. This has been done, by way of trial, from the Lists of Arabic names of places collected by Mr. Smith, and found in the Second Appendix to the present volume. Very often, however, the exact boundaries remained doubtful; partly because many known places do not occur in the lists; and partly because of several districts there yet exist no lists at all; e. g. Yafa, Haifa, Belâd Besharah, Belâd esh-Shủkif, etc. The boundaries of the subdivisions, in particular, were difficult to be determined accurately; and they are consequently for the most part omitted. Nevertheless, even this approximation to a more exact division, will afford a more definite and correct view, than has been the case with the attempts in all former maps, founded as they were on far more imperfect data.

=== Jerusalem ===
The 1845 map of Jerusalem was originally based upon on the 1840–41 Royal Engineers maps of Palestine, Lebanon and Syria, together with data from Ernst Gustav Schultz, who had been the Prussian consul since 1842. It was published as part of Schultz's lecture to the Gesellschaft für Erdkunde zu Berlin, and shows the contemporary city with biblical overlays.

== Gallery ==
=== Palestine ===
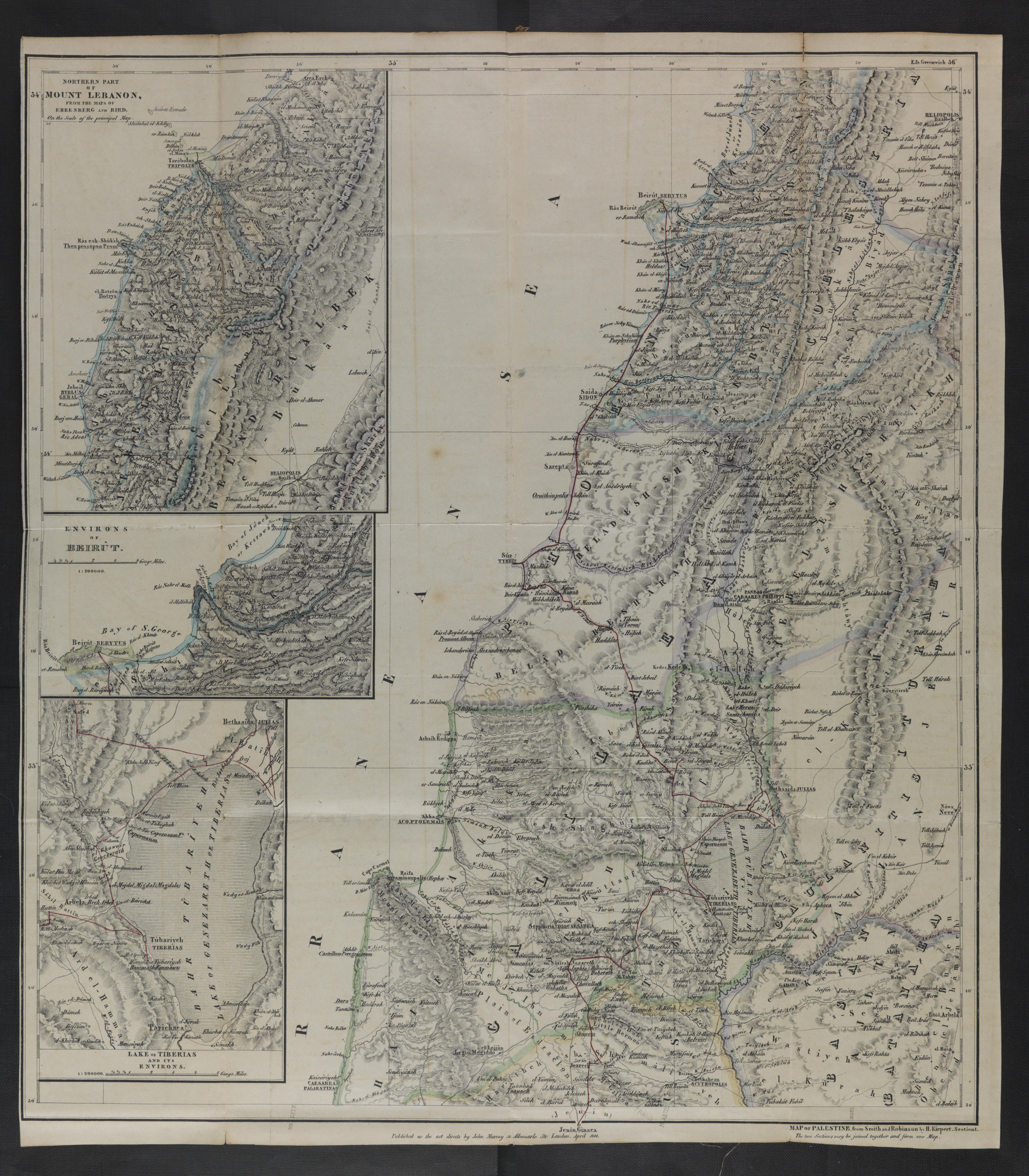
Northern Palestine and Lebanon, 1841

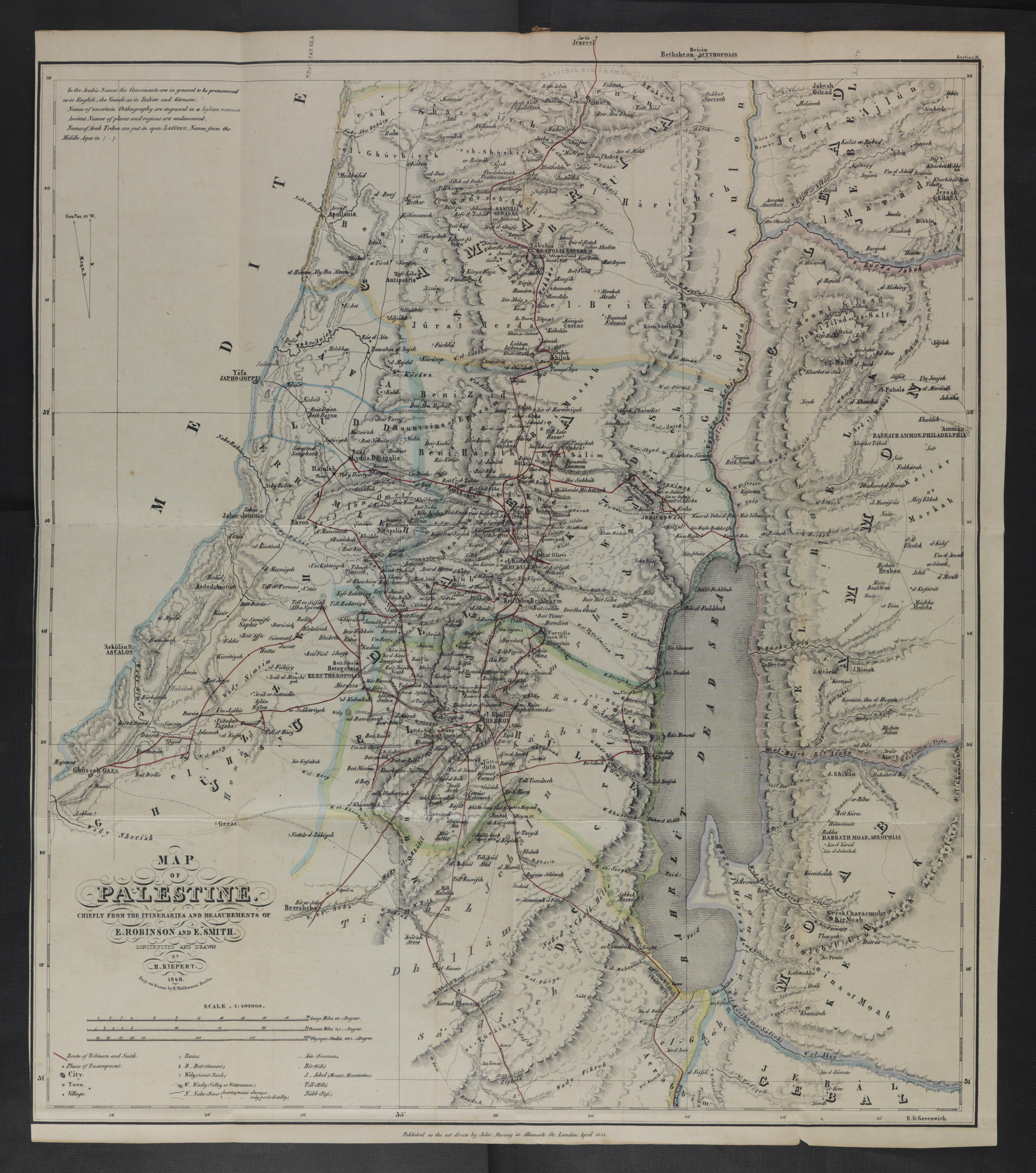
Southern Palestine, 1841

Northern Palestine and Lebanon, 1856

Southern Palestine, 1856

Sinai (including the area known today as the Negev)

=== Jerusalem ===
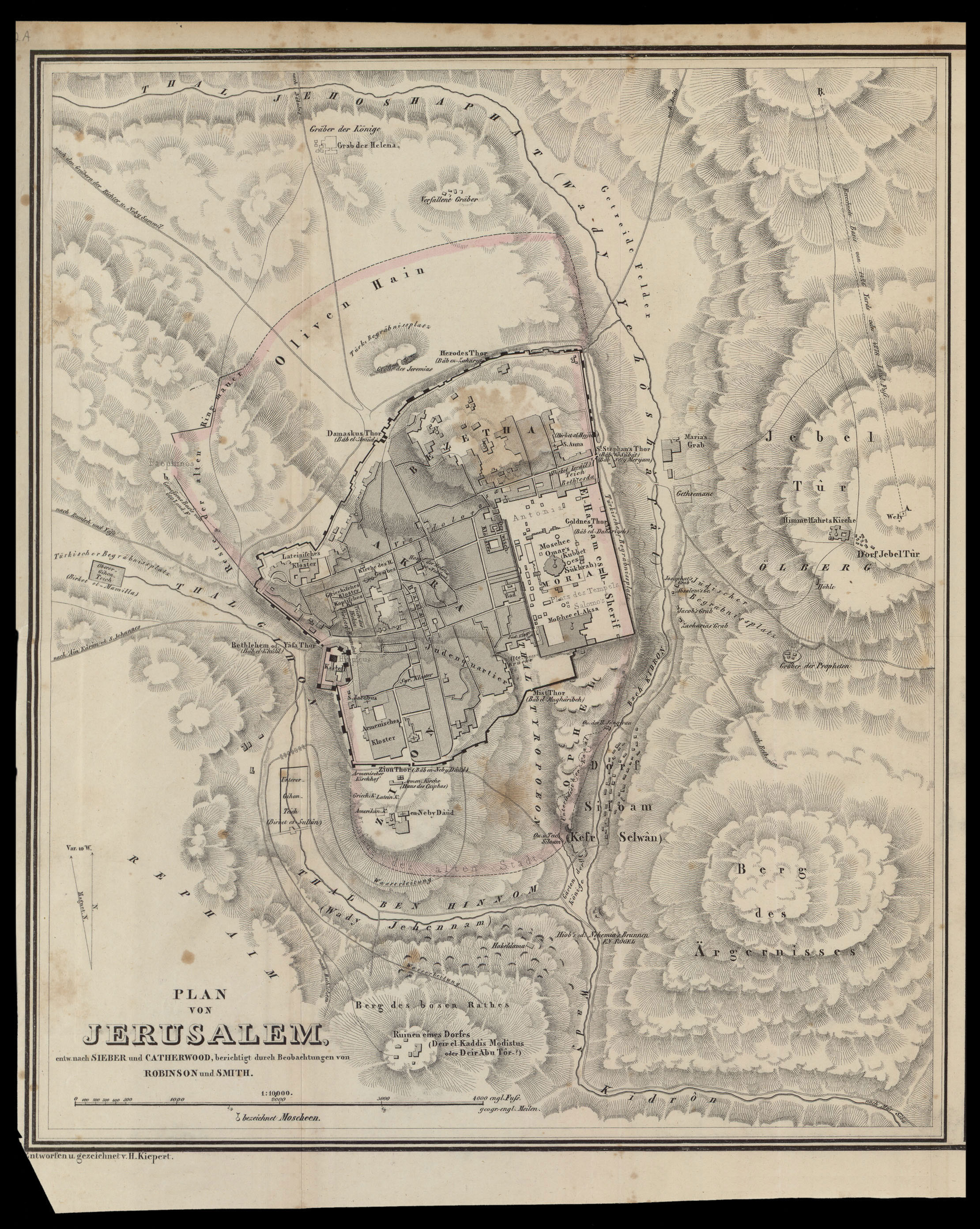
Jerusalem 1842

Jerusalem 1845

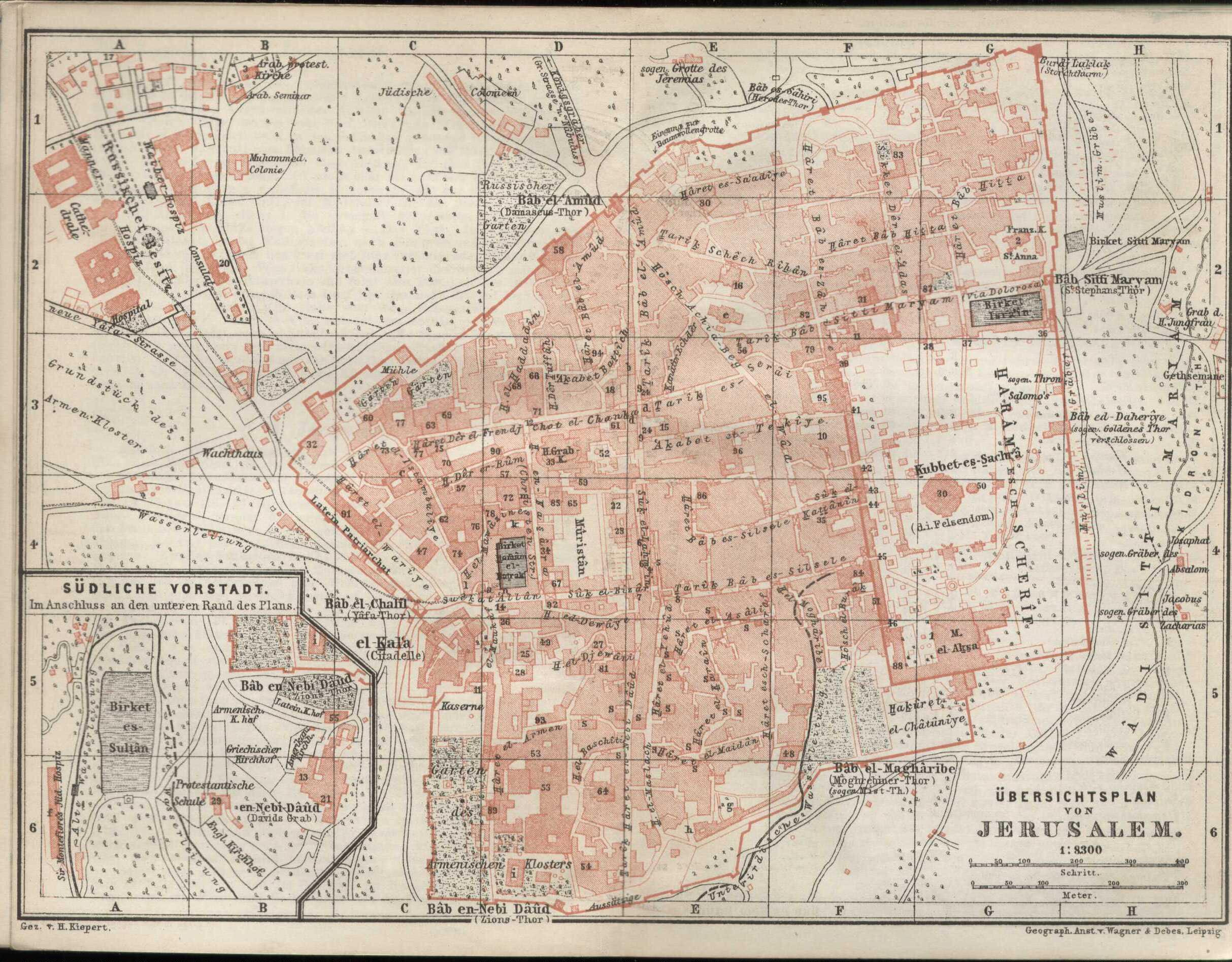
Jerusalem 1880

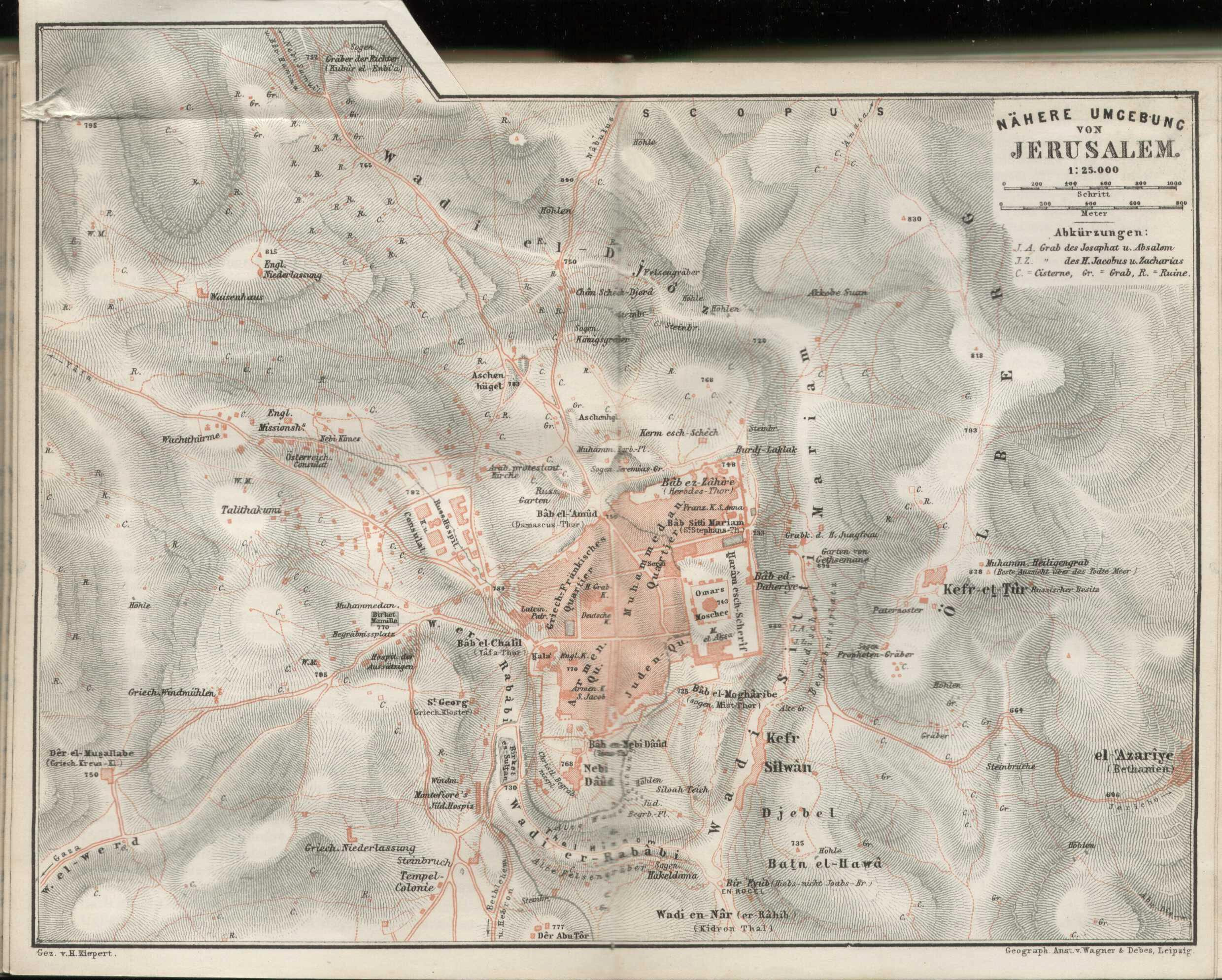
Jerusalem surrounds 1880

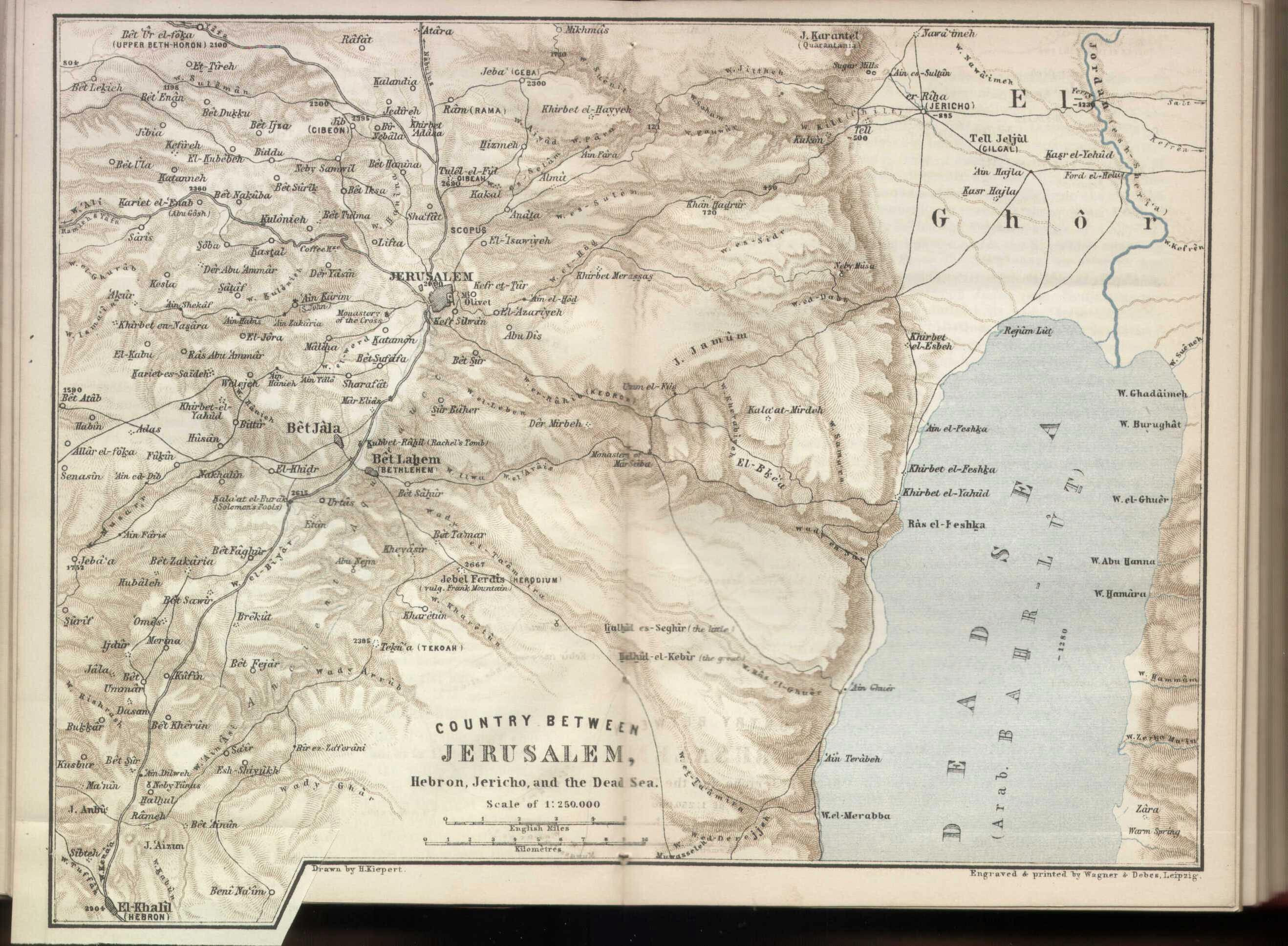
Country between Jerusalem, Hebron, Jericho and the Dead Sea 1876

== Bibliography ==
=== Primary sources ===
- Kipert, Heinrich (1841). "Memoir on the maps accompanying this work". Biblical Researches in Palestine, Mount Sinai and Arabia Petraea: A Journal of Travels in the year 1838. Vol. 3. Boston: Crocker & Brewster. pp. 29–55.

=== Secondary sources ===
- Moscrop, John James (1 January 2000). Measuring Jerusalem: The Palestine Exploration Fund and British Interests in the Holy Land. A&C Black. ISBN 978-0-7185-0220-1.
- Gibson, Shimon (2011). "British Archaeological Work in Jerusalem between 1865–1967: An Assessment". In Katharina Galor and Gideon Avni (ed.). Unearthing Jerusalem: 150 Years of Archaeological Research in the Holy City. Pennsylvania State University Press. ISBN 978-1-57506-223-5.
- Goren, Haim; Faehndrich, Jutta; Schelhaas, Bruno (28 February 2017). Mapping the Holy Land: The Foundation of a Scientific Cartography of Palestine. Bloomsbury Publishing. ISBN 978-0-85772-785-5.
- Levy-Rubin, Milka; Rubin, Rehav (1996). "The Image of the Holy City: Maps and Mapping of Jerusalem". In Nitza Rosovsky (ed.). City of the Great King: Jerusalem from David to the Present. Harvard University Press. ISBN 978-0-674-36708-1.
- Goren, Haim (25 April 2017). "The Historical Emergence of Replication". In Ayelet Shavit and Aaron M. Ellison (ed.). Stepping in the Same River Twice: Replication in Biological Research. Yale University Press. ISBN 978-0-300-22803-8.
