= Samuel I. Prime =

American journalist (1812–1885)

Samuel Irenæus Prime
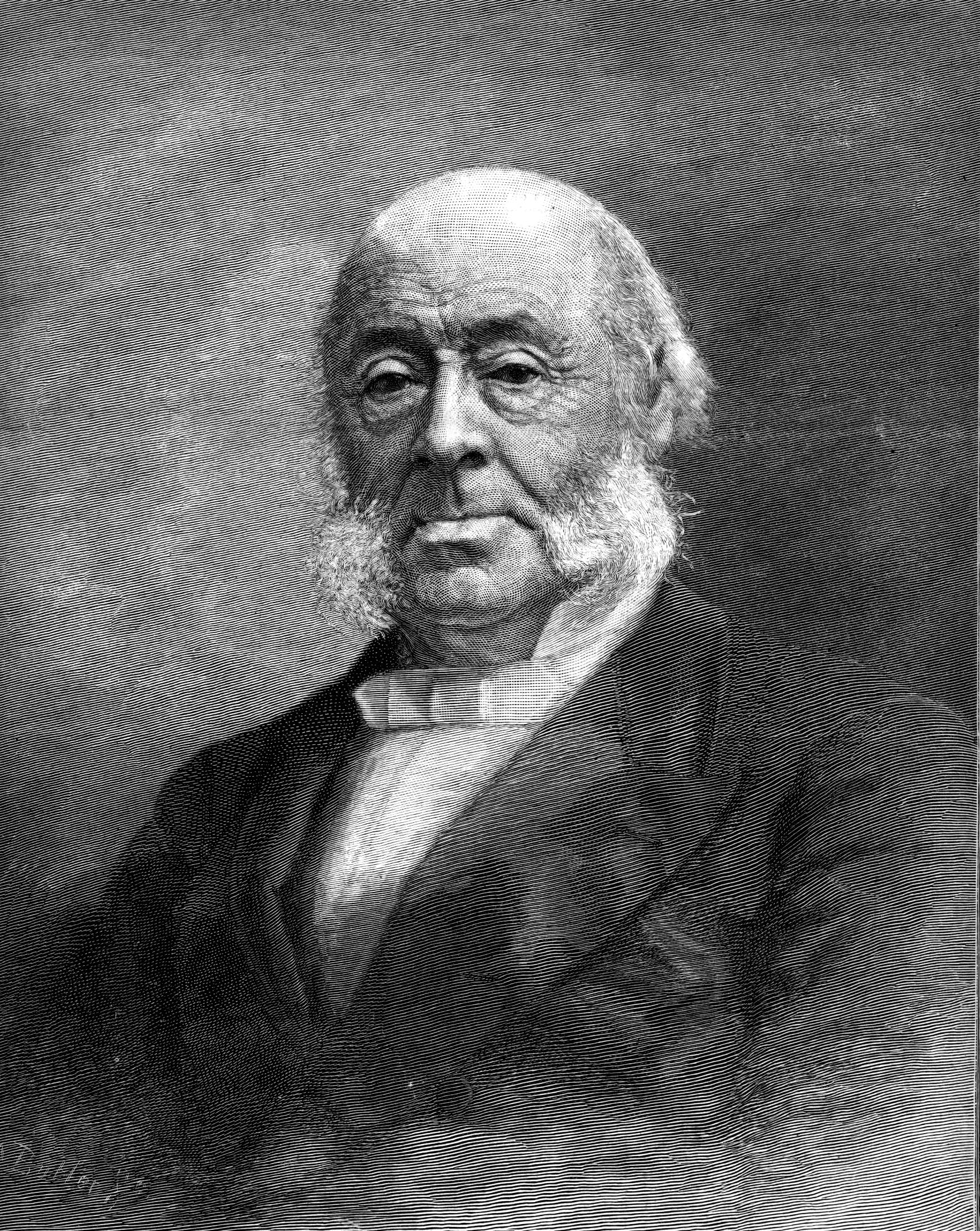
- Born: November 4, 1812; Ballston, New York
- Died: July 18, 1885 (aged 72); Manchester, Vermont
- Parents: Nathaniel Scudder Prime; Julia Ann Jermain
- Relatives: William Cowper Prime (Brother); Benjamin Prime (Grandfather)

Samuel Irenæus Prime (1812–1885) was an American clergyman, traveler, and writer.

== Life ==
He was born at Ballston, New York on November 4, 1812, to Nathaniel Scudder Prime, a son of Benjamin Prime. He graduated from Williams College in 1829. Three years later he entered Princeton Theological Seminary, was licensed to preach in 1833, and in 1835 was installed pastor of the Presbyterian Church at Ballston Spa, N. Y. For a time he was principal of the academy at Newburgh, N. Y. In 1840 he entered upon the chief work of his life as editor of the New York Observer, a paper of which he afterward came to be the principal owner. His brother and then his son-in-law, Rev. Charles A. Stoddard, carried on the editorship after his death. He was the founder of the New York Association for the Advancement of Science and Art, president and trustee of Wells College, and a trustee of Williams College.

He was the great-grandson of noted American patriot and pastor, Ebenezer Prime.

He died in Manchester, Vermont on July 18, 1885.

== Works ==
With many books of religious character, Prime published:

- Life in New York (1848)
- Travels in Europe and the East (1855)
- The Power of Prayer (1859)
- Letters from Switzerland (1860)
- American Wit and Humor (1859)
- The Alhambra and the Kremlin (1873)
- Life of Samuel F. B. Morse (1875)
- Irenæus Letters (1880, 1885)
