= Philip King (historian) =

American historian (1925–2019)

Philip J. King (March 26, 1925 – December 7, 2019) was an American Roman Catholic priest, historian, and archaeologist.

== Life ==
King was born in Newton, Massachusetts. He graduated in 1945 from Saint John's Seminary in Boston. King was ordained to the priesthood on May 4, 1949, by Archbishop Richard Cushing of the Roman Catholic Archdiocese of Boston. He earned higher degrees: a Licentiate of Sacred Theology (STL) in 1954 from Catholic University of America in Washington, D.C., a Licentiate of Sacred Scripture (SSL) in 1957 from Pontifical Biblical Institute, and a Doctor of Sacred Theology (STD) 1959 from Pontifical Lateran University in Rome. King also served in several parishes in the Boston Archdiocese. King died at the Regina Cleri Residence in Boston, Massachusetts.

He held a professorship in biblical studies in the Department of Theology at Boston College from 1974 until his retirement in 2001.

In 2006, the foundation created from the estate of Leon Levy established the Philip J. King Professorship at Harvard University, to support a scholar who will use an interdisciplinary approach to advance the understanding of ancient civilizations in the Near East and the Mediterranean. (Note: King never held the chair named for him. The first professor to hold the chair is Peter Der Manuelian, an Egyptologist.)

== Bibliography ==
- The Bible Is for Living: A Scholar's Spiritual Journey
- Amos, Hosea, Micah: An Archaeological Commentary
- Jeremiah: An Archaeological Companion
- With Lawrence Stager:
  - Life in Biblical Israel (in Library of Ancient Israel series)
