= William Goodell (missionary) =

American translator and missionary

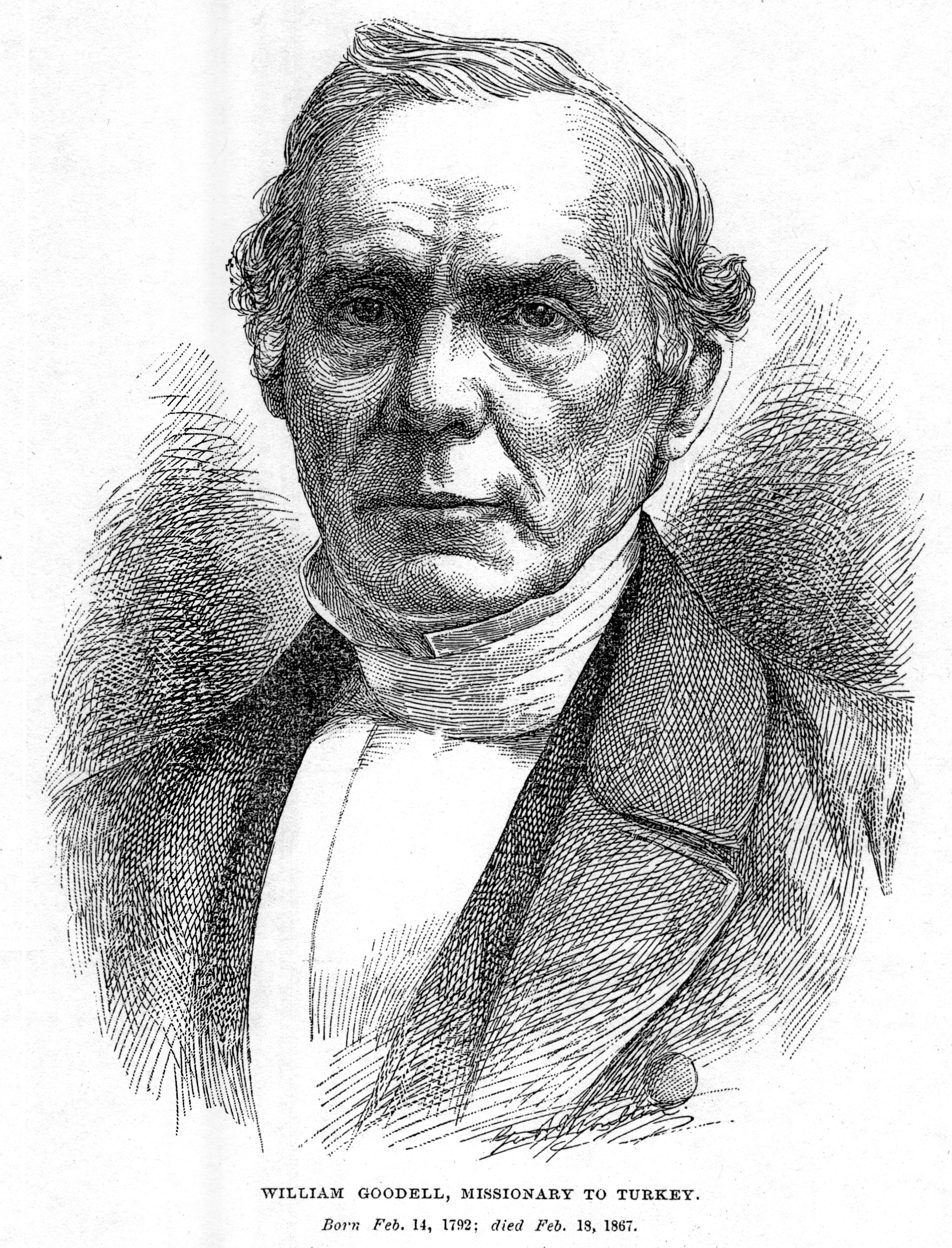
William Goodell, Missionary to Turkey

William Goodell (1792–1867) was an American missionary and writer.

== Early life and education ==
He was born at Templeton, Mass., educated at Phillips Academy (Andover), Dartmouth College, and Andover Theological Seminary.

== Career ==
In 1822 he was ordained and married Abigail Perkins Davis.

He was accepted as a missionary by the American Board and at the end of 1822 the Goodells sailed for Malta for language training and then on to Beirut with Isaac Bird and his family, where he aided in establishing the station which became the center of the Syrian mission.

In 1828, on account of threatened war between England and Turkey, the missionaries moved to Malta, where Goodell worked in the preparation and printing of books for the mission. In 1831 he published the Armeno-Turkish New Testament.

With the defeat of the Ottoman fleet at Navarino in 1831, the way to Constantinople was open and he commenced the Armeno-Turkish mission. During his missionary life, he and his devoted wife endured many trials and perils and were compelled to move their residence 33 times in 29 years. One of his main works was the translation of the Bible into Armeno-Turkish (Turkish written in Armenian letters), spending twenty years in the task and its revision.

== Later life and death ==
In 1865, after 43 years, he returned to the United States and died in Philadelphia on February 18, 1867. He had been living at the residence of his son, Dr. William Goodell. His son-in-law Edward Dorr Griffin Prime published his memoirs in 1876.

His papers are held by the US Library of Congress.

== Family ==
Goodell was married to Abigail and they had several children;

- A daughter named Mary; Mary and her daughter Emma Barnum were still living in Harput in 1895.
- A son, William Jnr, who went on to become a doctor.
- A daughter named Abigail who married Edward Prime.

== Publications ==
His publications include;

- Instructions to the missionaries about to embark for the Sandwich Islands (Crocker and Brewster, 1823), (with Isaac Bird and the American Board of Commissioners for Foreign Missions)
- Armeno-Turkish New Testament
- Rapp vē gurtʻarěchěměz Yisus Kʻristōsun eēnki ahtě. ([British and Foreign Bible Society], 1831)
- Ahdülatik'ten yirmi iki kitap [v.2] ([American Bible Society], 1841)
- The missionary's father: a letter from Rev. William Goodell. ([American Tract Society], 1843)
- Commentary on the Gospel of Matthew (William Griffith, 1851)
- The old and the new, or, The changes of thirty years in the East: with some allusions to Oriental customs as elucidating Scripture (M.W. Dodd, 1853)
- New Testament in Turkish, in Armenian characters. (Istanbul], 1856)
- Mattʻēos inchilinin tʻēfsiri ([s.n.], 1860)
- Vazlar: t'ēvrat' ilē... (Harowt'iwn Minaseaněn T'apkhanēsintē, 1864)
- Forty years in the Turkish empire. (American Board of Commissioners for Foreign Missions, 1891), (with E. D. G. Prime)
