= Isaac Bird =

Isaac Bird (19 June 1793 – 14 June 1876) was one of the first Protestant missionaries in Syria. He was best known for his book, Bible work in Bible lands: or, Events in the history of the Syria mission.

He undertook a number of journeys throughout Syria and Palestine, primarily in the 1820s and 1830s.

He was ordained in October 1821. At the end of 1822, the Birds sailed for Malta for language training and on to Beirut with William Goodell and his family. In 1824, Mrs Bird and Mrs Goodell opened a school for Arab elementary-aged children in Beirut.

In 1825 he had a school with 85 Syrian pupils. In 1833, he wrote his Thirteen Letters in reply to the Maronite Bishop of Beirut, which were printed in Arabic at the American Press that had been moved to Beirut in April of that year.

He left Syria in 1836, and taught at Gilmanton Theological Seminary and a local school in Connecticut until 1869.

He died in 1896 in Hartford, Connecticut.

== Publications ==
- The Jewish Prisoner (Boston, 1860)
- Martyr of Lebanon (1864)
- Bible Work in Bible Lands (Presbyterian Board, 1872)
- Translation of the Life of Omar ibn Said: Manuscript No. 1 by Omar ibn Said (Translated by Isaac Bird)
- Thirteen Letters to the Maronite Bishop of Beirut

He also carried out translations for the travel writer Theodore Dwight.

== Bibliography ==
- Kidd, T.S. (2018). American Christians and Islam: Evangelical Culture and Muslims from the Colonial Period to the Age of Terrorism. Princeton University Press. ISBN 978-0-691-18619-1.
