= Benjamin Prime =

American writer (1733–1791)

Benjamin Youngs Prime (December 20, 1733 – October 31, 1791) was an American poet, essayist, and songwriter.

Prime was born on Long Island to noted American Patriot and pastor Ebenezer and Experience (née Youngs) Prime. He graduated from the College of New Jersey in 1751; he matriculated June 12, 1764, at the University of Leiden in the Netherlands and took his medical degree at the same University July 7, 1764. The title description of his thesis is: Dissertatio medica inauguralis, de fluxu muliebri menstruo quam ... pro gradu doctoratus ... eruditorum examini submittit Benjaminus Young Prime ... ad diem 7. Julii MDCCLXIV, h.l.q.s... - Lugduni Batavorum : Apud Theodorum Haak, 1764. - 46 p.; 24 cm He wrote essays in Hebrew, Greek, Latin, French, and Spanish, and many songs and ballads which were very popular during the American Revolutionary War. Among his publications are The Patriot Muse, or Poems on Some of the Principal Events of the Late War, by an American; Columbia's Glory, or British Pride Humbled; A Poem on the American Revolution; Muscipula Cambryomachia.
