= Newtown Creek bridges =

Set of bridges in New York City

Newtown Creek is a body tributary of the East River in New York City, whose main flow also serves as a part of the border between Brooklyn and Queens. It has four tributaries of its own, English Kills and Whale Creek in Brooklyn and Dutch Kills and Maspeth Creek in Queens. There are several bridges crossing these waterways.

== Crossing Newtown Creek ==
Map

There are several bridges crossing the main body of Newtown Creek. These bridges are listed in order from the point at which Newtown Creek forms off of the East River.

Name	Type	Lanes	connects	along	built	demolished	Image
Vernon Avenue Bridge			Greenpoint and Long Island City	Vernon Avenue and Manhattan Avenue	1905	1954	
Pulaski Bridge	bascule bridge	two roadways and a pedestrian walkway	Greenpoint and Long Island City	McGuinness Boulevard and 11th Street	1954		
Greenpoint Avenue Bridge	bascule bridge	two roadways and two pedestrian walkways	Greenpoint and Blissville	Greenpoint Avenue	1850s,1900,1929,1987		
Meeker Avenue Bridge (Penny Bridge)	swing bridge	two roadways and two walkways	Greenpoint/East Williamsburg with Laurel Hill/Maspeth		1894	1933	
Kosciuszko Bridge	non-moveable bridge	6 car lanes	Greenpoint/East Williamsburg with Laurel Hill/Maspeth	BQE	1939	2017	
Kosciuszko Bridge	non-moveable bridge	two roadways and a pedestrian walkway	Greenpoint/East Williamsburg with Laurel Hill/Maspeth	BQE	2017, 2019		
Maspeth Ave Bridge	unknown	unknown		Maspeth Avenue		1876	
Grand St Bridge	swing bridge	two roadways and two pedestrian walkways	East Williamsburg	Grand Street			

== Crossing Dutch Kills ==
There are several bridges crossing Dutch Kills in Queens, which are all movable bridges except for the Long Island Expressway bridges. These bridges are listed in order from the point at which Dutch Kills forms off of Newtown Creek.

Name	Type	Lanes	connects	along	built	demolished	Image
DB Cabin	swing bridge	railway	Greenpoint and Long Island City	LIRR's Lower Montauk Branch			
Cabin M	single-leaf bascule bridge	railway		LIRR's now-abandoned Montauk Cutoff			
Borden Avenue Bridge	retractile bridge	two roadways and a pedestrian walkway	Blissville	Borden Ave	1908		
Long Island Expressway structure	non-moveable bridge						
Hunters Point Ave Bridge	bascule bridge	two roadways and two pedestrian walkways	Blissville	Hunters Point Avenue			

== Crossing English Kills ==
There are two bridges crossing English Kills in Brooklyn. These bridges are listed in order from the point at which English Kills spurs off of Newtown Creek.

Name	Type	Lanes	connects	along	built	demolished	Image
Metropolitan Ave Bridge	bascule bridge	two roadways and a pedestrian walkway	East Williamsburg	Grand Street and Metropolitan Avenue merge to cross over this bridge.			
English Kills Bridge	non-moveable	railway	East Williamsburg	Bushwick Branch			
