= McGuinness Boulevard =

Boulevard in Brooklyn, New York

- Oakland Street (former)
- Interactive map of McGuinness Boulevard
- Namesake: Peter J. McGuinness
- Maintained by: New York City Department of Transportation
- Location: Greenpoint, Brooklyn, New York City
- Postal code: 11222
- Coordinates: 40°43′42″N 73°57′01″W
- South end: Brooklyn-Queens Expressway
- Major junctions: Driggs Avenue; Nassau Avenue; Manhattan Avenue
- North end: Pulaski Bridge

Construction
- Commissioned: 1954

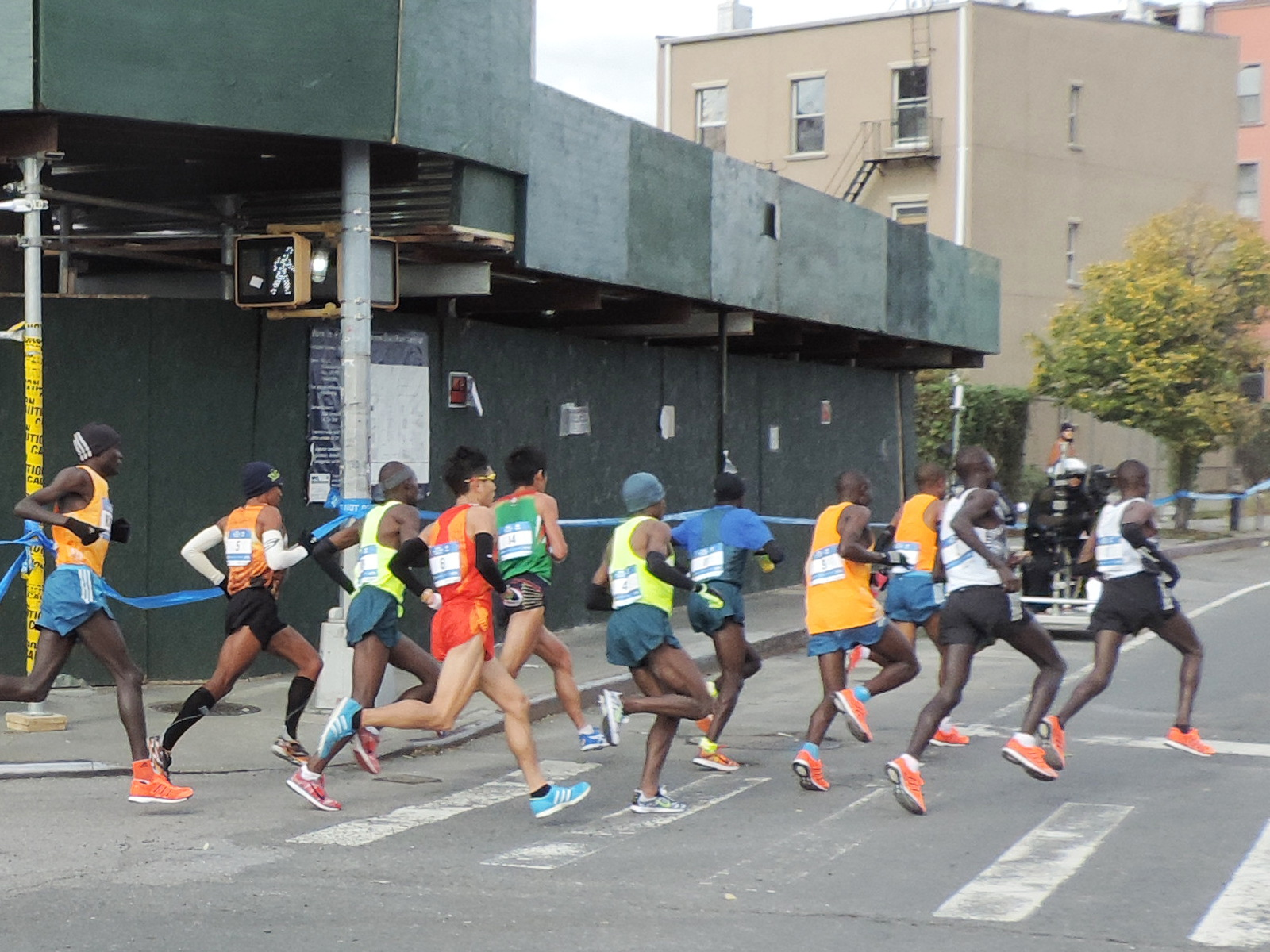
NYC Marathon leaders rounding the corner onto McGuinness Boulevard

McGuinness Boulevard is a boulevard in Greenpoint, a neighborhood in the New York City borough of Brooklyn. It runs between Interstate 278 (Brooklyn-Queens Expressway) in the south and the Pulaski Bridge in the north, which connects Greenpoint to Jackson Avenue (NY 25A) in Long Island City, Quee

McGuinness Boulevard was formerly known as Oakland Street, which went from Driggs Avenue to Newtown Creek. The road was widened considerably in 1954 to six lanes, with three lanes in each direction, after the Pulaski Bridge opened, which replaced the Vernon Avenue Bridge downstream. In 1964, it was renamed after former local Democratic alderman Peter McGuinness.

== Safety ==
The boulevard had a reputation as a dangerous roadway, with three pedestrians and one cyclist dying on the boulevard between 2008 and 2013. Having one of the highest fatality rates in Brooklyn, it has been compared to Queens Boulevard in Queens, which is called the "Boulevard of Death". According to one study, at the intersection with Nassau Avenue alone, drivers violated traffic laws almost four times per minute. As a result, the speed limit was lowered in 2014 from 30 miles per hour (48 km/h) to 25 miles per hour (40 km/h) as part of Mayor Bill de Blasio's Vision Zero initiative. In 2014, locals requested further mitigation infrastructure, including speed cameras and left-turn traffic lights.

In 2023, the New York City Department of Transportation announced a redesign of the street. Early plans called for the entire boulevard to be narrowed to one travel lane in each direction; another lane would have been converted into a protected bike lane. The plan was delayed after an aide to Mayor Eric Adams claimed that the plan's only supporters did not live in the community. A compromise proposal was unveiled in August 2023, when the DOT announced that protected bike lanes would still be installed but that the parking lanes would be converted to travel lanes during rush hours. Installation of the bike lanes began shortly afterward. A simplified redesign of the boulevard commenced in August 2024; as part of the redesign, the center lane in each direction became a parking lane during off-peak hours, while the outermost lane became a bike lane. After Zohran Mamdani became mayor in 2026, he announced that the original redesign with protected bike lanes would be implemented instead.
