= North Brooklyn Community Boathouse =

U.S. non-profit organization

Coordinates: 40.738424°N 73.953139°W

- Artwork by artist Duke Riley
- Abbreviation: NBCB
- Formation: 2010
- Founded: 2010
- Founder: Founding Members Include; Dewey Thompson, Jens Rasmussen, Monica Schroeder and others
- Purpose: Environmentalism, Education, and Boating
- Location: Greenpoint, Brooklyn, New York
- Region served: Greenpoint, Williamsburg, and Bushwick
- Members: Over 280
- Website: nbcboathouse.org

The North Brooklyn Community Boathouse (NBCB) is a Brooklyn-based, volunteer run, 501(c)(3) nonprofit community organization. It is dedicated to enabling safe, responsible, human-powered boating, and educating residents to be stewards of the history, ecology and sustainability of the waterways of Newtown Creek and the adjacent East River.

== History ==
Formerly named North Brooklyn Boat Club, NBCB started in 2010 as a way to reconnect people to the waterways with the goal of recreation, education and environmental stewardship. NBCB is an open, volunteer-run organization consisting of kayakers, canoeists, sailors, environmentalists, boat builders, community leaders and activists. NBCB was formally organized with the support of Greenpoint Waterfront Association for Parks and Planning (GWAPP) and many in the community as a way to increase access to open space and the waterways by securing funding for the Greenpoint Boathouse.

=== Greenpoint Community Boathouse and Environmental Education Center ===
A 2008 settlement over pollution fines by the New York City Department of Environmental Protection led the state of New York to create a $7 million fund for projects that would tangibly benefit the community affected by the pollution with a priority given to projects relating to the environment. NBCB proposed building one of the largest boathouses in the city along the shores of the Newtown Creek. The project aimed to enhance the community’s open space, educational and recreational facilities and improve the perception of the Newtown Creek. The idea was that awareness and stewardship are inextricably linked so a boathouse would best connect people to the waterways.

The proposal received strong community support and garnered the approval of elected officials and organizations, including: Congresswoman Nydia Velázquez, Brooklyn Borough President Marty Markowitz, State Assemblyman Joe Lentol, City Council Member Steve Levin, Open Space Alliance for North Brooklyn (OSA) and Neighbors Allied for Good Growth (NAG). In a combination of the public polling and feasibility ranking, the Boathouse project was selected as the top priority project for the funding. Based on the public support and strength of the proposal the Boathouse was chosen to be funded. The Boathouse was allocated $3 million from the state. The City Parks Foundation will oversee the spending and construction of the Boathouse. As of 2014, negotiations are being made for 6,500 square feet on Ash Street.

=== The Broadway Stages Boatyard ===
In the interim period before the construction of the Greenpoint Boathouse the members of NBCB searched for a location with which to access the water and held monthly meetings at the Brooklyn Rod & Club. Christine Holowacz, of GWAAP, introduced NBCB to Tony Argento, the owner of the film company Broadway Stages. Argento granted NBCB the 150-by-20-foot empty plot next to the Pulaski Bridge and Newtown Creek to create a boatyard. The Metropolitan Waterfront Alliance and many of the more established boat clubs in Brooklyn, Manhattan, and Long Island City provided expertise and spare equipment. NBCB received a grant for infrastructure expenses from the Hudson River Foundation and donations of materials, such as steel storage containers, from local businesses and organizations including Allocco Recycling, Box House Hotel, Build It Green! NYC and TNT Scrap Metal to transform the empty lot to the Broadway Stages Boatyard. The storage containers were modified to serve as boat storage, an educational center, and boat building workshop. Local artist, Duke Riley, designed artwork for NBCB.

The Boatyard was further improved with the addition of floating docks obtained in partnership with Urban Swim. The Manhattan Solid Waste Advisory Board (SWAB) and Citizens Committee for New York City has provided NBCB a grant to improve its composting and gardening initiatives. NBCB is also collaborating with LaGuardia Community College on building an educational center on site called the Ed Shed and the Newtown Creek Alliance on research projects. The Ed Shed received additional funding for more environmental research equipment from a grant created by a legal settlement from the Greenpoint oil spill. The Ed Shed has become a center for teaching and researching the Newtown Creek ecosystem by students, researchers, and community members.

The Boatyard has been recognized for being fun for families, dating and as one of the top places to boat in New York City. Common trips include Red Hook, Brooklyn Bridge Park, Bushwick Inlet, and Roosevelt Island. Several local businesses and musicians such as the New York Distilling Company, Brooklyn Brewery, Aura Sonic, Hungry March Band and Sasha Dobson have made donations to help NBCB host benefit concerts to continue its programming.

== Projects ==
The North Brooklyn Community Boathouse has led many projects related to nearby bodies of water. It has hosted free public canoe trips on the East River and Newtown Creek; boat building and restoration, performed weekly water quality testing; performed mycoremediation on Newtown Creek in order to clean it up from pollutants; and formed a Newtown Creek Armada to clean the polluted Newtown Creek. The organization has also participated in environmental activities, such as gardening and composting; creating an environmental education center (Ed Shed) hosting birdwatching tours; performed wildlife monitoring; created a Living Dock for local fauna; and balloon mapped (see Public Lab) in the area.

NBCB has hosted concerts and events like the Summer Solstice benefit concert; Rock the Pulaski benefit concert; film showings; the SHORE Feast; and SeaChange: We All Live Downstream. Beautification projects include the Newtown Nets (found objects) and the "Don’t Put Your Butt in the Creek" campaign to install cigarette disposal containers along the Newtown Creek.
