= Mussel Island =

Former island in New York City

Coordinates: 40.72380°N 73.92574°W

Mussel Island was an island in Newtown Creek located near its confluence with Maspeth Creek, between the Brooklyn neighborhood of Greenpoint and the Queens neighborhood of Maspeth in New York City.

Prior to industrialization, Newtown Creek hosted a sizable population of mussel on its bottom and at the confluence of Maspeth Creek and Newtown Creek was Mussel Island, an uninhabited patch of marshland that survived into the 1940s. With hundreds of thousands of vessels traveling through Newtown Creek in the late 19th and early 20th centuries, this island posed a navigation hazard, forcing boats to tightly swerve around it.

In 1921, Congress approved a dredging project for Newtown Creek that proposed to eliminate Mussel Island in favor of a "turning basin" that would enable larger vessels to turn around. By the end of the following decade, the project was completed and the island disappeared beneath the water. Map company Hagstrom continued to mark the island on its maps until October 2000, when a reader asked The New York Times about the island and Hagstrom conceded that it no longer belonged on the map.
