= Greenpoint oil spill =

Decades-long period of severe pollution in Newtown Creek, New York City, USA

Coordinates: 40°43′42″N 73°56′19″W

The Greenpoint oil spill is one of the largest oil spills ever recorded in the United States. Located around Newtown Creek in the Greenpoint neighborhood of Brooklyn, New York City, between 17 and 30 million US gallons (64,000 and 114,000 m^{3}) of oil and petroleum products have leaked into the soil from crude oil processing facilities over a period of several decades. The spill was first noticed in 1978, and soil vapor tests were still reported as returning positive in 2008.

== History of the area ==
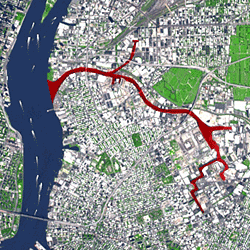
Newtown Creek

The areas of the northeast industrial section of Greenpoint along Newtown Creek were home to oil refineries from the 1840s, and by 1870 boasted more than 50 petroleum processing plants, many of which were incorporated into the Standard Oil Trust towards the end of the century. Standard Oil's successors (Mobil and later ExxonMobil) used the refining facilities until 1966 and later operated a bulk petroleum storage facility and a distribution terminal on the site until 1993. Other petroleum companies operating in the area were Amoco (later part of BP) and Paragon Oil (now part of ChevronTexaco).

== Discovery of the spill ==
In September 1978, a United States Coast Guard helicopter on a routine patrol discovered a plume of oil flowing in the creek, originating from a bulkhead at Meeker Avenue. A subsequent study revealed the large-scale soil contamination, which was estimated in excess of 50 acres (0.20 km^{2}) and a spillage volume of more than 17 million US gallons (64,000 m^{3}).

== Cleanup efforts and seepage mitigation ==
The first pumps were installed at the site in late 1979, and recovery efforts have increased over the years. The pump systems are operated by the site owners ExxonMobil, BP and, more recently, ChevronTexaco. Environmentalist organizations have said that there was little effort until the early 1990s and have labelled the clean up operations "rudimentary". In January 2006 the New York State Department of Environmental Conservation, backed by the involved companies, asserted that 9 million US gallons (34,000 m^{3}) of spilled oil had been recovered and cleaned up.

In 2007 a report by the United States Environmental Protection Agency on the spill raised the estimated size of the contaminated area to 100 acres (0.40 km^{2}) and the estimated spillage volume to 30 million US gallons (110,000 m^{3}), three times larger than the Exxon Valdez spill. The report also criticized the recovery efforts and a recent slowdown of the clean up.

According to an Environmental Protection Agency study, "the American Petroleum Institute (2002) indicates that 40% to 80% of a product spill may be retained in soils as residual product". The Department of Environmental Conservation's website states that petroleum companies participating in the cleanup have used a Free Product Recovery System for groundwater, rather than the soils.

A New York State Department of Health study, completed in May 2007, indicated that no vapor was coming from the spill into homes. The Environmental Protection Agency's (EPA) "Newtown Creek/Greenpoint Oil Spill Study Brooklyn, New York" states that vapor concentrations in "some commercial establishments" were found "above the Upper Explosive Limit". The study also said, "A review of the data collected by the NYSDEC shows that, in general, chemicals were detected at all locations in each home, but not in a pattern that would typically represent a vapor intrusion phenomenon."

A New York State Department of Environmental Conservation report tested residential blocks above the spill area concluded that there is no evidence of either oil or dangerous vapors seeping into people's homes. Brooklyn Paper columnist Tom Gilbert wrote, "This stands to reason, as the spilled oil tends to lie deep underground, capped by a nearly impermeable layer of clay." Soil vapor tests by both the DEC and the non-profit environmental organization Riverkeeper have confirmed the presence of pollutants in the ground, leading to several lawsuits against ExxonMobil.

As reported by NYU's ScienceLine, ExxonMobil's testing indicates that the existence of oil vapors remains unclear: "This summer, a contractor for Exxon Mobil conducted a soil vapor study in Greenpoint. It took ten samples from a residential area; of five samples that detected benzene, one was from an area above the oil plume at a level below 5.4 parts per billion."

== Litigation ==
On October 20, 2005, local residents within the area of the oil recovery operation, which is located in the predominantly commercial/industrial eastern section of Greenpoint near the East Williamsburg Industrial Park, filed a lawsuit against ExxonMobil, BP and Chevron in Brooklyn State Supreme Court, alleging they have suffered adverse health consequences. ExxonMobil asserts that the oil was spilled by Paragon Oil. In 2006 Chevron was dropped from the case.
