= Paragon Oil =

Defunct American oil company

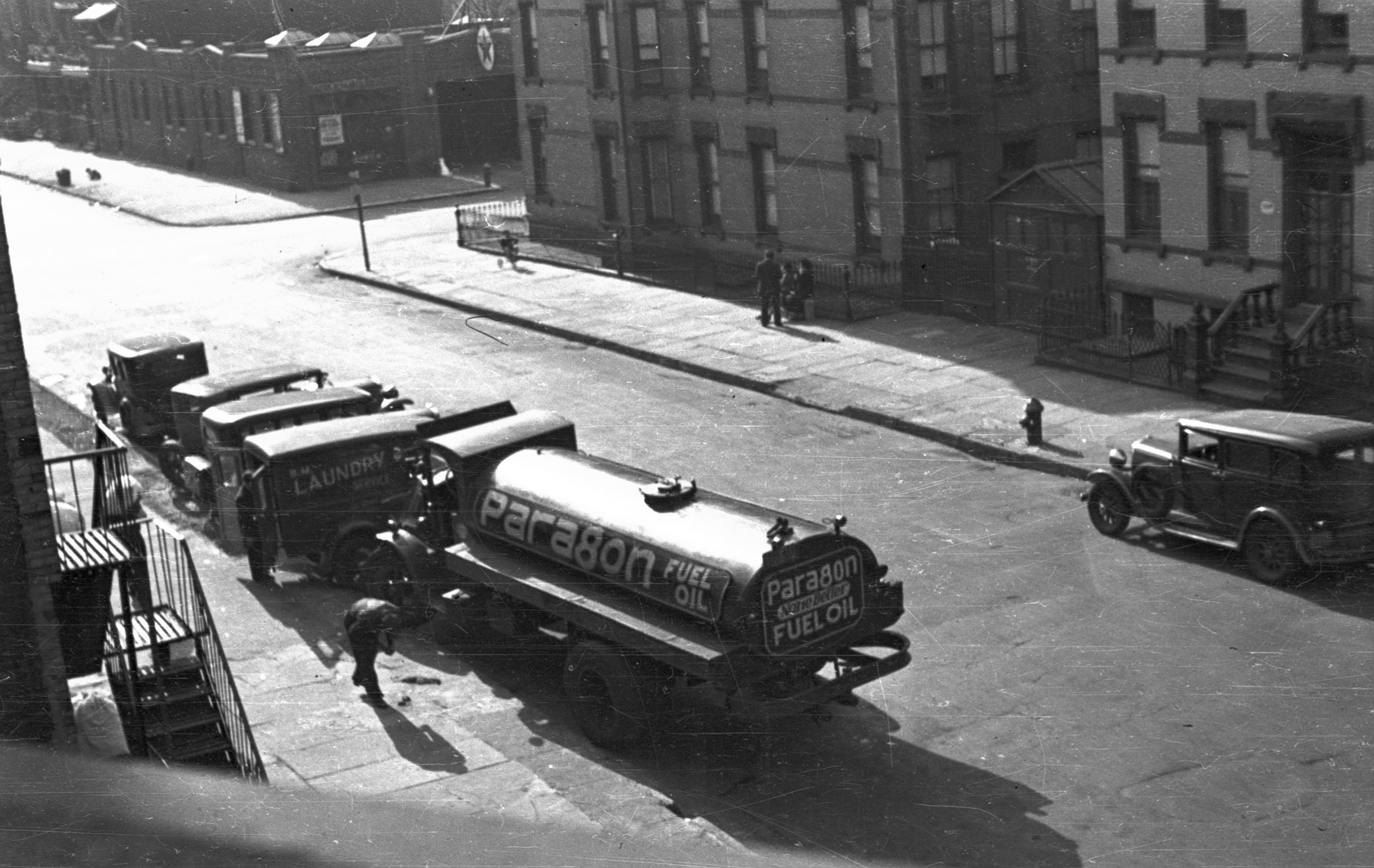
A Paragon Oil truck servicing a Brooklyn apartment building in the 1930s.

Paragon Oil was an American oil company, founded in 1925 in New York City by the Schwartz family, and sold to Texaco in the late 1950s. It is not related to the Paragon Oil Company operating today in Brooklyn.

== Founding of the company ==
Paragon Oil was founded by brothers Henry, Irving, Robert, Benjamin, and Arnold Schwartz. The brothers, and their sister Bess Schwartz Levy, were first-generation Americans, all born between 1896 and 1909 in Brooklyn, New York.

Their parents were Sam (Sholem) (née Chernofski) Schwartz, born circa June 1866, and Lena (Liba Chasia) Krakofsky, born circa March 1871, who were Jewish immigrants originally from the Mala Berezianka, Kivshovata, Tarascha, and Belaya Tserkov (Bila Tserkva) area, south of Kiev in Kiev oblast, Ukraine, who had immigrated to the United States between 1891 and 1895. The family's original surname had been spelled in various Russian Empire records as Chernofski, Cherninsky, Chernuavsky, and/or Chernyansky, derived from the Russian word for "black" and was changed to Schwartz, the German word for "black", upon emigration. Sam was the oldest or second oldest of seven Chernofski/Schwazrtz siblings, six of whom came to the US, and had originally been a leading blacksmith who owned many horses, wagons, and vast property in and around Belaya Tserkov.

Despite this well-off background, the family was poor upon arrival in New York. Sam worked once again as a blacksmith, but now in eastern Brooklyn. When they were young, elder brothers Henry and Irving went door-to-door in Brooklyn carrying around sacks of coal on their backs, peddling it to the nearby homes and residential buildings to earn extra money for their family. At that time, some large commercial buildings had oil-fired furnaces, but residential buildings did not. A combination of factors, including the equipment available at their father's blacksmith shop and the experience of their relatives back in Ukraine who were involved in the whale oil business, led to the brothers experimenting, designing, and finally building the first oil heaters designed for residential buildings, which eventually earned the family several patents on the design.

== Growth of the company ==
As time went on, Paragon Oil eventually switched its focus from building and selling these new residential oil burners to that of an oil distribution company, to supply the residential buildings that now had their new oil burners installed. They eventually won a major contract with New York City in the early 1930s to supply fuel oil to several city-run buildings. Despite this success, they still primarily remained a local operation in the New York area until the end of World War II. Europe was destroyed, and in desperate need of fuel oil. Because of their location close to the New York docks and their unique five gallon container packaging, Paragon Oil won the U.S. government contract as the only oil company to supply Europe with fuel oil during the post-war reconstruction. This contract catapulted the company into national prominence. Later, during the early days of the Cold War, Paragon supplied the U.S. government with oil for their submarines. The company operated a large fleet of fuel delivery trucks around the Northeastern United States, and eventually had several oil tankers. Toy versions of the fuel delivery trucks were even manufactured by the Corgi company.

== Sale of the company ==
The company continued in operation until the late 1950s. At that point, the brothers were getting older and wished to retire. The company was sold to Texaco in the late 1950s, with the sale becoming final in the early 1960s. The estimated sale price was in excess of $75 million, with the family receiving consulting fees of nearly $1 million per year afterward, as well as Texaco stock.

Most of the brothers used the profits from the sale to co-found the Brookdale Foundation, whose research focuses on gerontology and geriatric medicine. They also endowed many other charitable enterprises, primarily centered in the New York metropolitan area. These included the Metropolitan Opera at then-newly built Lincoln Center, several buildings and lecture programs at New York University, several New York City and Long Island hospitals including Mount Sinai Hospital, Fifth Avenue Synagogue, the Maimonides Foundation for Gifted Youth, and at least three graduate schools.

Eldest brother Henry Schwartz was married quite late in life to a former nun named Caroline Di Donato (b. 1896 in Ohio), who was also a former nurse and the former Dean of Women at Seton Hall University in New Jersey. Thus, despite his Orthodox Jewish background, he also donated heavily to many Catholic charities and organizations, including endowing The Caroline Di Donato Schwartz building at Seton Hall, which was completed in 1973.

== Schwartz family history ==
Sam's father, Chaim Yael "Hyman" Chernofski, married Gittel Rifka "Gertrude" Bobrutsky, daughter of Mordkho "Max" Bobrutsky and Sarah Fuchs, probably around 1863. Chaim and Sam had started the family into the Whale Oil business during the late 1880s. After the purges in the early 1890s, one part of the family decided to go to America, while others stayed behind in Russia to continue the exporting of Whale Oil. The family immigrated through the port of Bremen, Germany, where their name was changed from "Chernofski", which had at its root the Russian word for black, to "Schwartz", the German word for black. The family traveled to London, England during the early part of 1895 to strengthen contacts they had previously made with the Royal Court of Queen Victoria that would serve them later with Paragon Oil. According to old family documents, the majority of the family finally traveled to America during late 1895 as First Class passengers on the White Star liner Teutonic.

Several of the five brothers' first cousins, including the sons of Sam's youngest sibling Barney Schwartz and the sons one of Lena's cousins, also joined the operation. However, some of them chose to adopt different surnames in the workplace, including the surnames "Harvey" and "Lawrence", so that it would not be immediately obvious that most of the people working in the upper levels of the company had the last name Schwartz, and thus were related. Avoiding public anti-Semitism was also a contributing factor to the cousins' surname changes; indeed, even some of the five brothers' first names were different than those on their birth certificates and early census records, changed to sound less overtly Jewish. For example, Arnold's real first name was Abraham, and the brother whose birth certificate showed "Benny" Schwartz officially went by the more genteel "B. Davis" Schwartz for most of his later adult life.

== Founders' deaths ==
Henry Schwartz died in January 1983, Irving died in April 1974, Robert died in November 1971, Ben died in July 1969, and Arnold died in September 1979. Bess Schwartz Levy died around 1958. Their parents Sam and Lena Schwartz died in 1928 and 1941, respectively. The last of the original family members to work at Paragon Oil died in 2009. He was nonagenarian Jack Lawrence (née Jacob Schwartz), a well-known songwriter and former president of ASCAP, and the son of Sam's youngest sibling Barney.
