= Pulaski Bridge =

Bridge between Brooklyn and Queens, New York

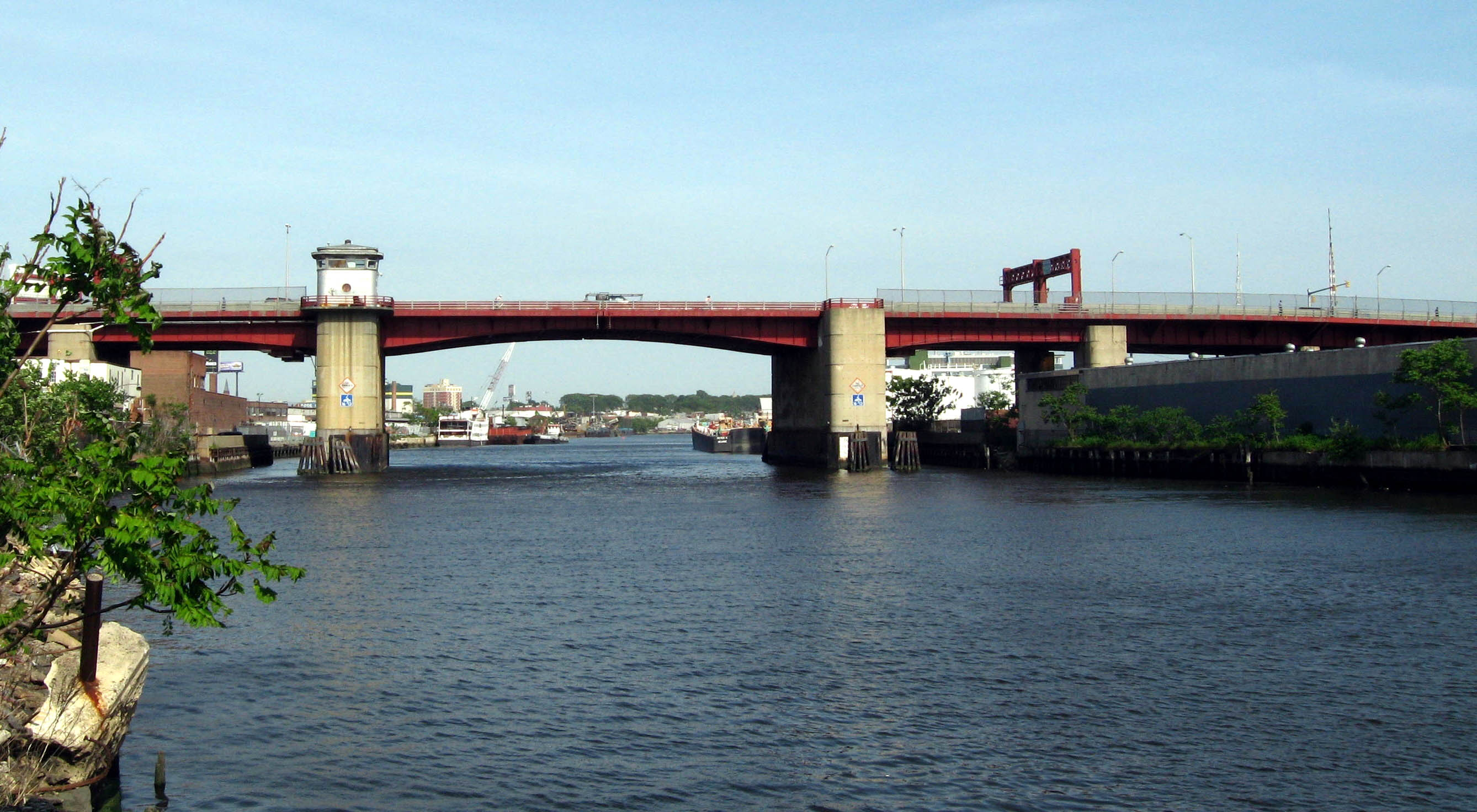
- View from downstream, looking East
- Coordinates: 40°44′21″N 73°57′9″W
- Carries: Five (5) lanes of motor vehicles, pedestrian/bicycle paths
- Crosses: Newtown Creek
- Locale: Brooklyn and Queens, New York City
- Maintained by: New York City Department of Transportation
- Followed by: Greenpoint Avenue Bridge

Characteristics
- Design: Four-leaf bascule bridge
- Material: Steel, reinforced concrete
- Total length: 2,810 feet (860 m)
- Longest span: 177 feet (54 m)
- Clearance below: 39 feet (12 m)

History
- Opened: September 10, 1954; 71 years ago

Statistics
- Daily traffic: 40,722 (2016)

Location
- Interactive map of Pulaski Bridge

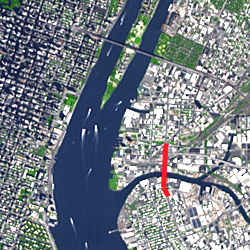
Pulaski Bridge from above, highlighted in red

The Pulaski Bridge in New York City connects Long Island City in Queens to Greenpoint in Brooklyn over Newtown Creek. It was named after Polish military commander and American Revolutionary War fighter Casimir Pulaski in homage to the large Polish-American population in Greenpoint. It connects 11th Street in Queens to McGuinness Boulevard (formerly Oakland Street) in Brooklyn.

== Description ==
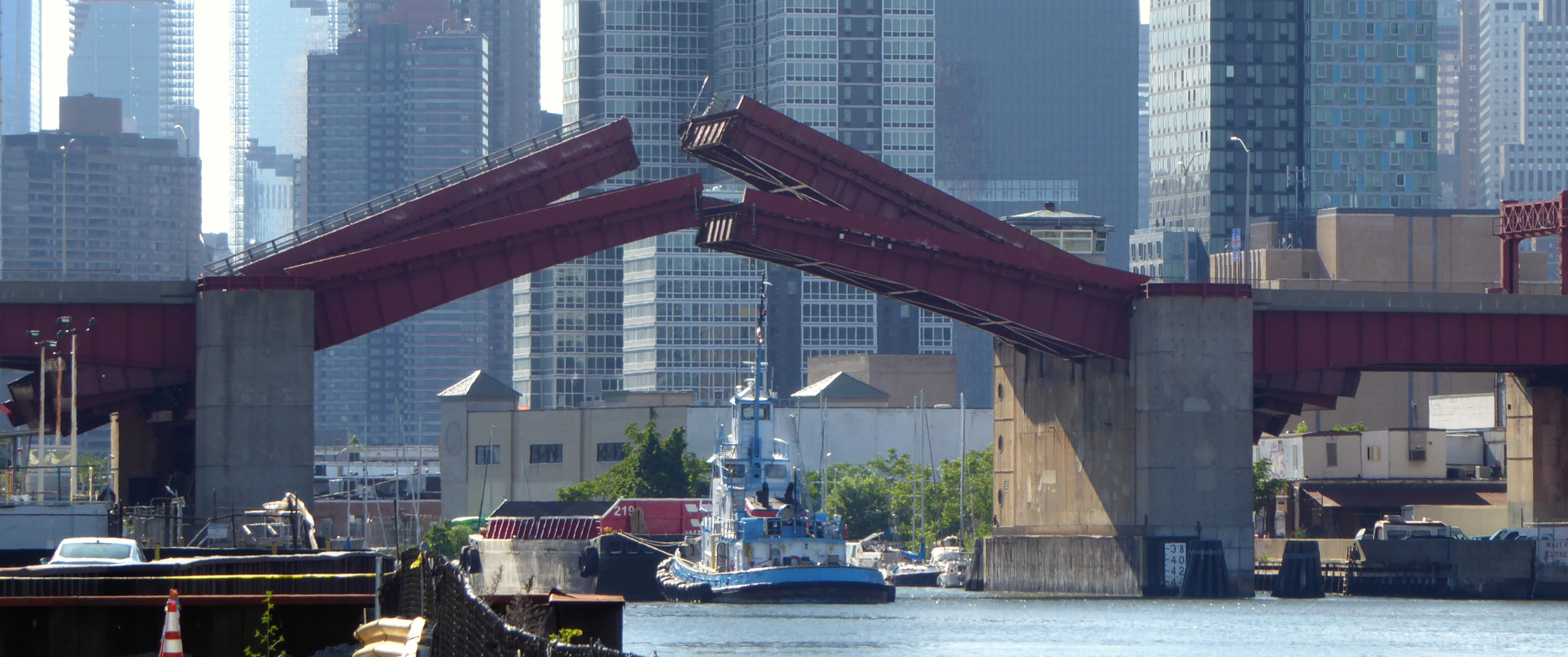
The bridge opening for barge traffic departing Newtown Creek

Designed by Frederick Zurmuhlen, the Pulaski Bridge is a bascule bridge, a type of drawbridge. Its span crosses Newtown Creek, Long Island Rail Road tracks, and the entrance to the Queens-Midtown Tunnel from south to north. The bridge carries six lanes of traffic and a pedestrian sidewalk; the pedestrian sidewalk is on the west or downstream side of the bridge, and has views of the industrial areas surrounding Newtown Creek, the skyline of Manhattan, and of a number of other bridges, including the Williamsburg Bridge, the Queensboro Bridge, and the Kosciuszko Bridge. The bridge was reconstructed between 1991 and 1994.

Located just over 13 miles (21 km) from the start of the New York City Marathon at the Verrazzano–Narrows Bridge, the Pulaski Bridge serves as the approximate halfway point in the race.

== History ==
The Pulaski Bridge opened to traffic on September 10, 1954. It served as a replacement for the nearby Vernon Avenue Bridge, which had linked Vernon Avenue (now Vernon Boulevard) in Long Island City with Manhattan Avenue in Greenpoint.

From 1979 until 1990, a message reading "Wheels Over Indian Trails" was painted on the Pulaski Bridge over the approach to the Queens-Midtown Tunnel. The artwork was created by John Fekner as a tribute to the thirteen Native American tribes who inhabited Long Island and referred to the changing traffic patterns on Vernon Boulevard, a former Indian trail.

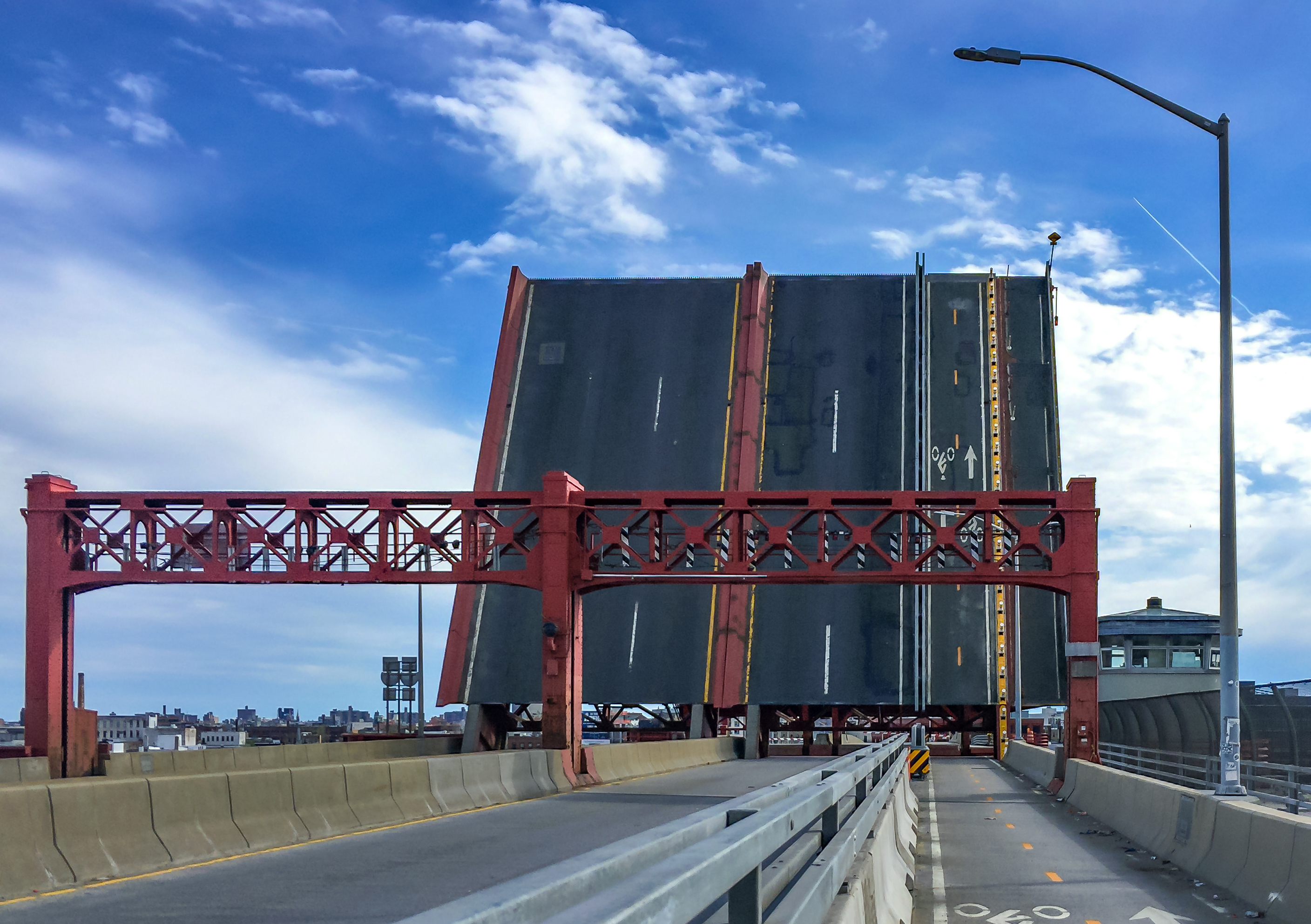
The bascule draw span open

In 2012, in response to the lack of adequate bicycle facilities currently on the Pulaski Bridge, the NYC Department of Transportation began studying the possibility of installing dedicated bicycle lanes on the bridge. Since the Pulaski is a drawbridge with an open section in the middle, it presents several challenges not faced by other bridges. First, physical dividers must be lightweight yet securely installed so they don't come loose when the drawbridge is opened. Secondly, the joints where the two leaves come together must be somehow protected to make them more bicycle wheel-friendly. In April 2013, in a letter to Assembly Member Joe Lentol, the NYC Department of Transportation Commissioner stated that the proposal for a two-way dedicated bike lane, which would convert the existing walkway to a pedestrian-only path, had met the requirements of a traffic analysis and that an engineering study and recommendations would be made by the end of the year. On October 25, 2013, Lentol announced that the DOT was in the process of designing a dedicated bike lane and that the final design would be presented to community board 1 in Brooklyn and Community Board 2 in Queens before the end of the year. Bike lane construction was originally projected to occur late spring or early summer of 2014. Construction occurred during the winter of 2015 and the bike lane opened at the end of April 2016.
