= Greenpoint Avenue Bridge =

Bridge between Brooklyn and Queens, New York

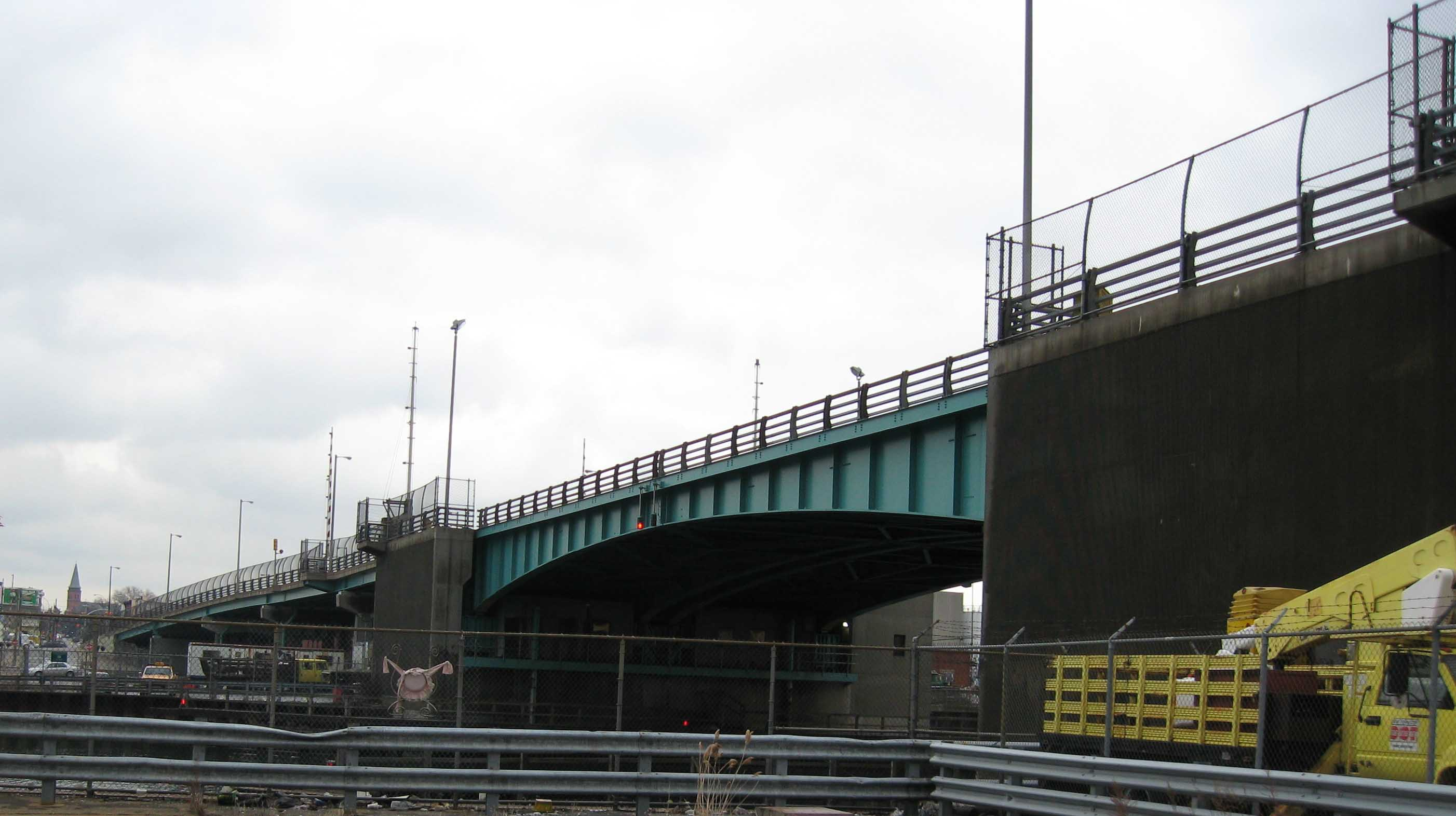
- From Brooklyn
- Coordinates: 40°44′0″N 73°56′25″W
- Crosses: Newtown Creek
- Locale: Brooklyn and Queens, New York City
- Official name: J. J. Byrne Memorial Bridge
- Maintained by: New York City Department of Transportation
- Preceded by: Pulaski Bridge
- Followed by: Kosciuszko Bridge

Characteristics
- Design: Bascule bridge
- Width: 70 feet (21 m)
- Longest span: 180 feet (55 m)
- Clearance below: 26 feet (7.9 m)

History
- Opened: 1987

Statistics
- Daily traffic: 31,622 (2016)

The Greenpoint Avenue Bridge is a drawbridge that carries Greenpoint Avenue across Newtown Creek between the neighborhoods of Greenpoint, Brooklyn and Blissville, Queens in New York City. Also known as the J. J. Byrne Memorial Bridge, the bridge is named after James J. Byrne, who served as Brooklyn Borough President from September 1926 until he died in office on March 14, 1930. Previously, Byrne was the Brooklyn Commissioner of Public Works.

== History ==
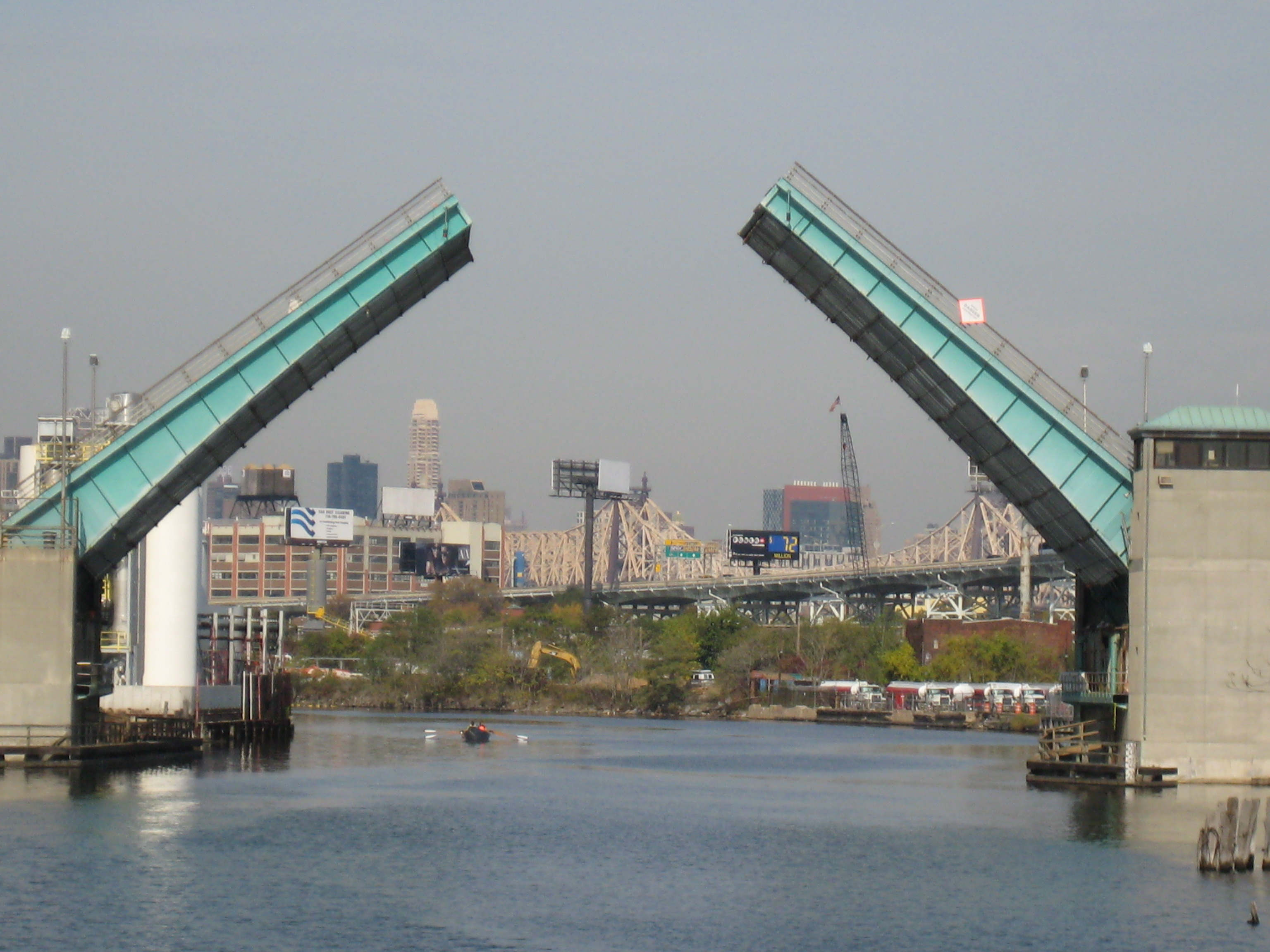
Opened for a ship, viewed from Newtown Creek

The Greenpoint Avenue Bridge is the sixth bridge to cross Newtown Creek in this location. In the 1850s, Neziah Bliss built the first drawbridge, which was called the Blissville Bridge. It was followed by three other bridges before being replaced by a new bridge in March 1900. A new bridge opened in 1929 and after suffering from mechanical problems it was replaced by the current structure in 1987.

Designed by Hardesty & Hanover, the Greenpoint Avenue Bridge was the recipient of an American Institute of Steel Construction Award in 1991.

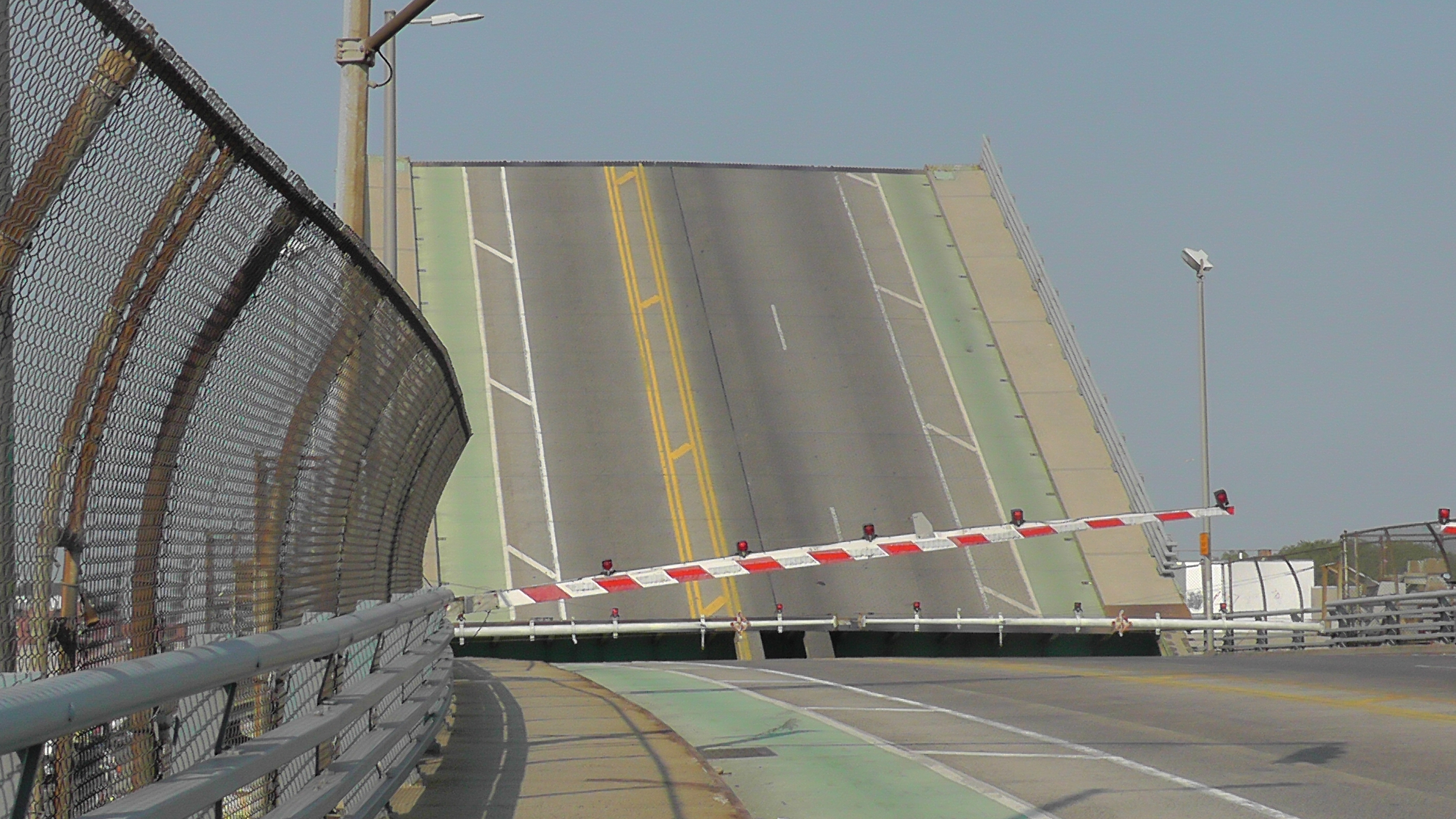
The bridge while open, viewed from Brooklyn

On March 30, 2009, New York City Mayor Michael Bloomberg held a press conference at the Greenpoint Avenue Bridge, announcing that it would receive $6 million in federal stimulus funds, which will be used to rehabilitate the bridge.

In 2011, the NYCDOT proposed an extension of the existing Greenpoint Avenue bike lane on the Brooklyn side across the bridge into Queens. The project was completed in 2015.
