= Newtown Creek =

Tributary of the East River in New York City

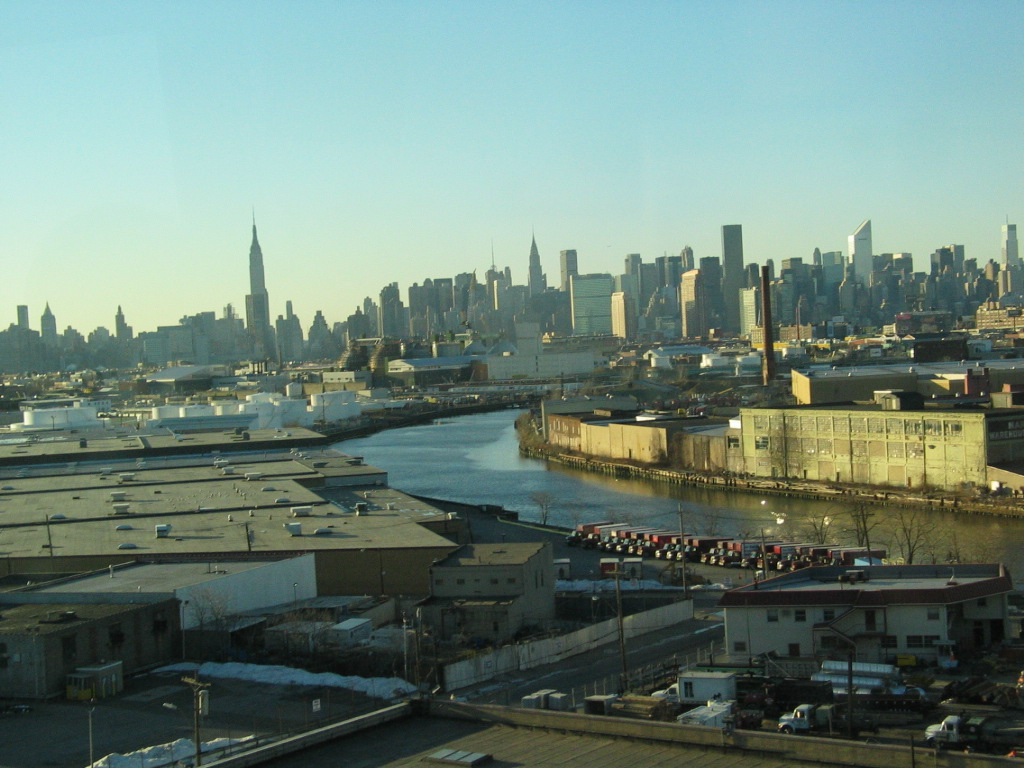
- The Creek in Long Island City

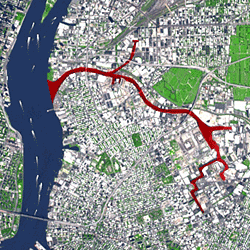
- Newtown Creek and its tributaries

Location
- Country: United States
- State: New York
- Municipality: New York City

Physical characteristics
- Source: Confluence of East Branch and English Kills
  - coordinates: 40.718412°N 73.924127°W
- Mouth: East River
  - location: 2nd Street and 54th Avenue in Long Island City
  - coordinates: 40.73734°N 73.96112°W
  - elevation: 0 ft (0 m)
- Length: 3.5 mi (5.6 km)
- Discharge
  - average: 59.3 cu ft/s (1.68 m^{3}/s)

Basin features
- Tributaries
  - left: English Kills, Whale Creek
  - right: Maspeth Creek, Dutch Kills

Newtown Creek, a 3.5-mile (6-kilometer) long tributary of the East River, is an estuary that forms part of the border between the boroughs of Brooklyn and Queens, in New York City. Channelization made it one of the most heavily used bodies of water in the Port of New York and New Jersey and thus one of the most polluted industrial sites in the United States, containing accumulated discarded toxins, an estimated 30,000,000 US gallons (110,000,000 L; 25,000,000 imp gal) of spilled oil, including the Greenpoint oil spill, raw sewage from New York City's sewer system, and other accumulation from a total of 1,491 sites.

Newtown Creek was proposed as a potential Superfund site in September 2009, and received that designation on September 27, 2010. The EPA has delayed its cleanup until 2032.

== Course ==
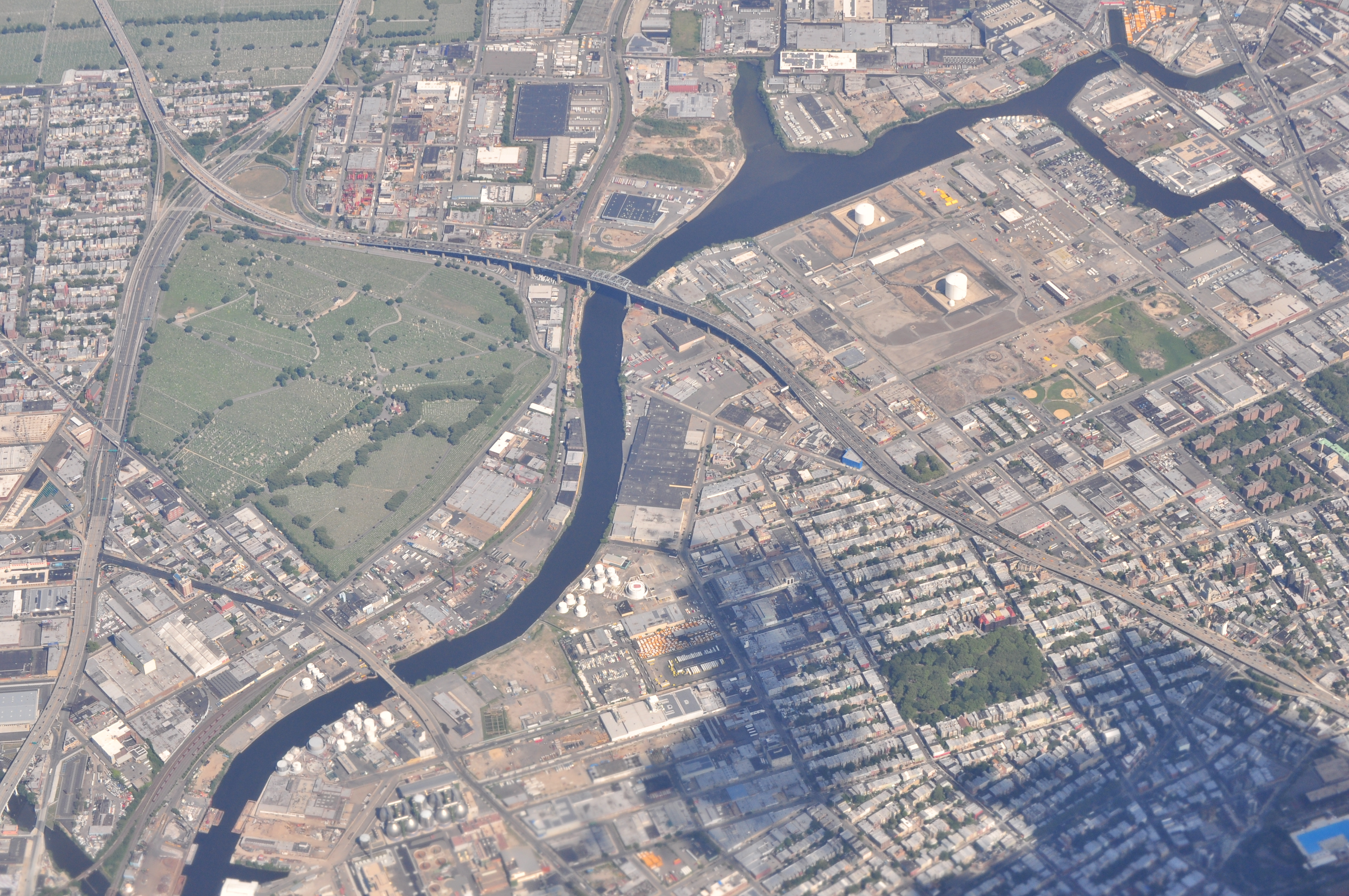
Aerial photograph of Newtown Creek (2013). View looking east.

The creek begins near the intersection of 47th Street and Grand Avenue on the Brooklyn-Queens border at the intersection of the East Branch and English Kills. It empties into the East River at 2nd Street and 54th Avenue in Long Island City, opposite Bellevue Hospital in Manhattan at 26th Street. Its waterfront, and that of its tributaries Dutch Kills, Whale Creek, Maspeth Creek, and English Kills are heavily industrialized. Combined sewer overflow (CSO) pipes drain into all four major tributaries, as well as the East Branch of the creek; during rainstorms, these handle raw sewage.

Because the surrounding neighborhoods are completely sewerized, the creek has little natural inflow of natural freshwater, and is largely stagnant except as a result of tides. Its outgoing flow of 14 billion US gallons (53,000,000 m^{3}) per year consists of CSO, urban runoff, raw domestic sewage, and industrial wastewater. There is a 15-foot-thick (4.6 m) layer (in some places 25 feet (7.6 m)) of polluted sludge that has congealed on the creek bed.

The Lower Montauk Branch of the Long Island Rail Road (LIRR), used primarily for freight, runs along the north bank and across the Dutch Kills via a small movable truss bridge. The abandoned Montauk Cutoff, which connects the branch to the LIRR's Main Line runs on a separate bridge over the Dutch Kills located directly north of the Montauk Branch's bridge.

=== Tributaries ===
Dutch Kills starts at 47th Avenue and 29th Street in Long Island City, and empties into Newtown Creek on the right bank. "Kill" is a term derived from Dutch for a creek or other small waterway, sometimes used, as here, in the plural "kills". The course of Dutch Kills is lined mainly with warehouses. Formerly, its headwaters were at Northern Boulevard and 33rd Street. It formed a navigable stream along with Sunswick Creek to the north, making it easy for merchants to transport produce and goods along the creek.

Whale Creek starts at what is now the Newtown Creek Wastewater Treatment Plant in Greenpoint, Brooklyn, and empties into the creek on the left bank opposite Dutch Kills. It originally extended farther south to Greenpoint Avenue, but was straightened and turned into a canal in the 20th century. Much of the creek was infilled to make way for the treatment plant. Today, the Newtown Creek Nature Walk runs along the remaining spur of the creek.

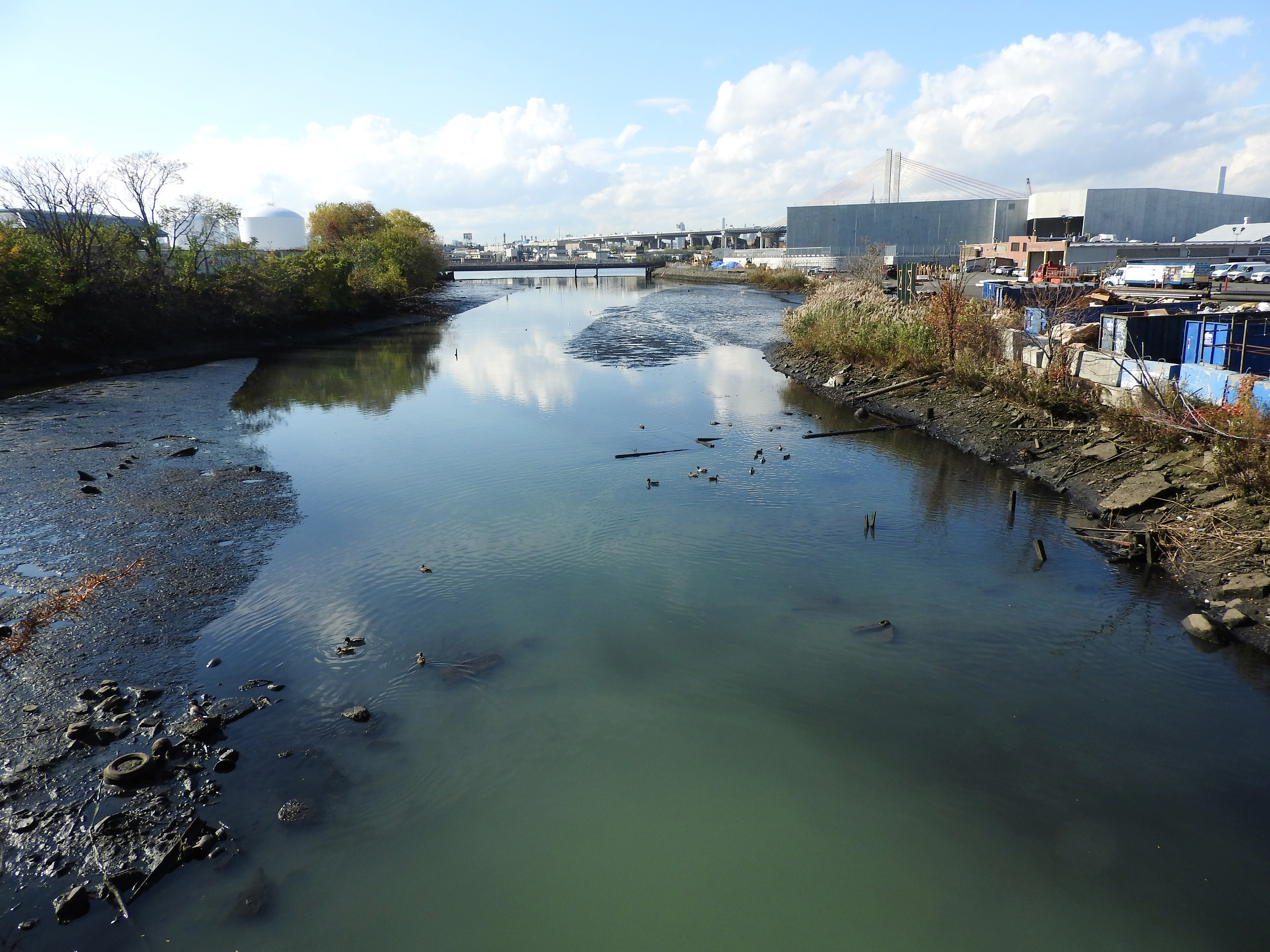
Head of Maspeth Creek

Maspeth Creek starts on the right bank, within Maspeth, Queens, and runs about 1,000 feet (300 m) before emptying into Newtown Creek. Prior to the industrial development of Queens, Maspeth Creek originated on the Ridgewood Plateau, a plateau that separated the watersheds of Newtown Creek to the south and Flushing River to the east.

English Kills originates from a CSO pipe at 465 Johnson Avenue in East Williamsburg. It drains 344,400,000 US gallons (1.304×10^{9} L) of sewage annually. The present path of English Kills was straightened in the late 19th century. The Kills is crossed by the LIRR Bushwick Branch and the Metropolitan Avenue Bridge.

The East Branch originates at Metropolitan and Onderdonk Avenues, at a CSO pipe that drains 586,000,000 US gallons (2.22×10^{9} L) annually. It is crossed only by the Grand Street Bridge.

== History ==
=== Early history ===
The creek derives its name from New Town (Nieuwe Stad), which was the name for the Dutch and British settlement in what is now Elmhurst, Queens. Before the nineteenth century urbanization and industrialization of the surrounding neighborhoods, Newtown Creek was a longer and shallower tidal waterway, wide enough that it contained islands, including Mussel Island and Furman Island. It drained parts of what are now the neighborhoods of Bushwick, Williamsburg, and Greenpoint in Brooklyn; and Maspeth, Ridgewood, Sunnyside, and Long Island City in Queens.

At the time of the American Revolution, British General Warren had his headquarters along the creek. The Sackett House was inherited by the wife of DeWitt Clinton, and Clinton stayed there during much of the planning of the Erie Canal project. Apples called Newtown Pippins originated on the estate of Gershom Moore there, and soon had a wide reputation, appearing on the "Select List" of apples issues by the Horticultural Society of London, and drawing the praise of Benjamin Franklin, Thomas Jefferson and Queen Victoria, who, after tasting the fruit, revoked the import tax on apples.

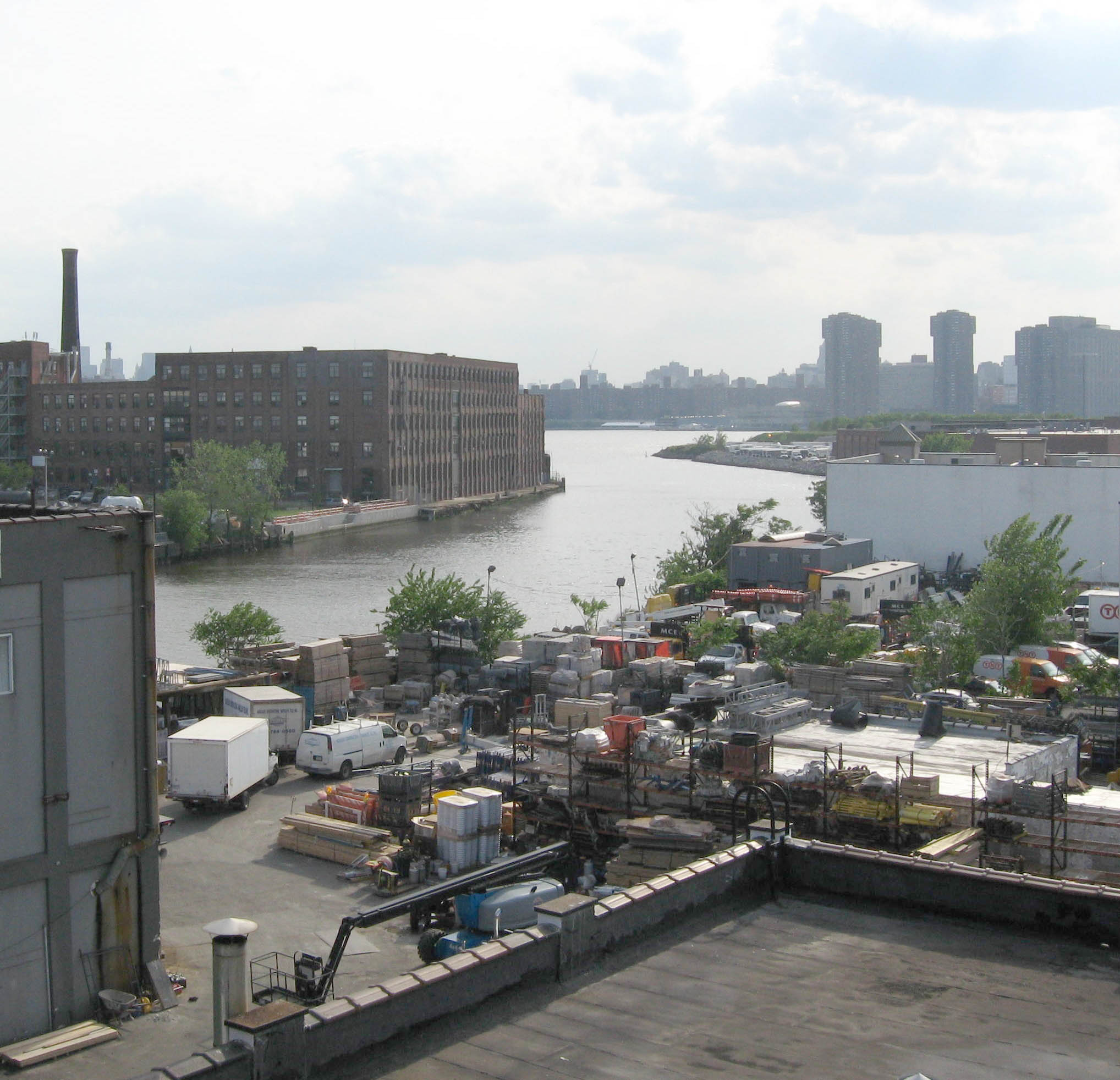
Mouth of the Creek, seen from Pulaski Bridge. Manhattan Avenue Bridge formerly connected Manhattan Avenue on the left bank to Vernon Boulevard

=== Industrialization ===
Farmers used the creek to barge their goods to market early in the 19th century, but traffic on the creek increased dramatically when petroleum from Pennsylvania was shipped up the creek to facilities which had once distilled illuminating oil from coal. More refineries sprang up, including Robert Chesebrough's for making petroleum jelly, marketed as Vaseline. There was only one refinery in Queens in 1860, but the demand for kerosene and other petroleum products increased the number dramatically, all of which required large parcels of land for storage and processing, as well as pipelines for transporting the product. John D. Rockefeller decided that Standard Oil would be based in the Newtown Creek area, and soon began buying up the refineries of rivals, until by the 1880s the company was processing 3,000,000 US gallons (11,000,000 L; 2,500,000 imp gal) of crude oil weekly, employing 2,000 people in their more than 100 stills.

The pastoral land around the creek became "a vast interconnected complex of wharves, stills, tanks, and pipelines," to service not only the refineries, but also the facilities of related industries such as manufacturers of paint and varnish, and chemical companies which produced sulfuric acid. It is estimated that, in all, these industrial facilities produced 300,000 US gallons (1,100,000 L; 250,000 imp gal) of waste material each week, which was burnt off, or discarded into the air or the water of the creek. The waste included sludge acid, a tar-like substance which was sold to companies that used it as an ingredient in superphosphate fertilizer. These businesses, which built factories close to the source of their raw material, then dumped their waste into the environment, as did the chemical companies with the sulfur that was the waste from producing sulfuric acid.

By the mid-19th century, Newtown Creek had become a major industrial waterway, with the City of Brooklyn starting to dump raw sewage into it in 1866. It was bounded along most of its length by retaining walls, and the shipping channel was maintained by dredging. Public protests over the degradation of the waterway and the surrounding area, and frequent newspaper exposés did little to ameliorate the problem, considering the economic benefit of the industries located along the creek and nearby. Queens was not yet a part of New York City, meaning that the city's Board of Health had no jurisdiction there, and the Brooklyn Board of Health sided with the polluters in court. Even a report from The New York Times in 1885 that Standard Oil was dumping sludge acid into the creek, covering the banks at low tide, made little difference. By the end of the 19th century, the Times was reporting that the creek was totally devoid of any lifeforms.

Oil refineries and distribution depots were concentrated in Greenpoint, Brooklyn. Across the creek, in Laurel Hill, later called West Maspeth, chemical plants and copper smelting facilities also polluted the waterway. The largest was the 35-acre (14 ha) Laurel Hill Chemical Works, owned by Phelps Dodge, which was in operation between 1871 and 1983. At its peak the company employed approximately 1,250 people, but the workforce declined when the company closed the smelter, and eventually the site was sold to the U.S. Postal Service in 1986. When the USPS discovered unacceptable levels of heavy metal waste from the smelting process, the U.S. Attorney's office forced Phelps Dodge to void the sale, take the property back, and to clean it up, which, as of 2016, has not been done.

A canal to connect Newtown Creek with Flushing River was first proposed in the late 19th century. The canal would have flushed out the stagnant water from Maspeth Creek and created a direct route between the two waterways, but was opposed by residents of central Queens, who were against the industrialization of what was then farmland. In 1914, surveys were made for the construction of a 5.4-mile (8.7 km) canal to connect Flushing River and Newtown Creek, plans for which dated back at least a century. The canal was never built. A dredging project for the creek, approved in 1929, eliminated Mussel Island by the 1930s. Around the same time, the small Shanty Creek on the eastern shore of Furman Island was drained, and the island became part of Maspeth.

==== Notable pollution incidents ====
Before 1950, bulk-oil storage facilities near the corner of Manhattan Avenue and Huron Street were spilling petroleum in amounts that were eventually more than the Exxon Valdez oil spill. An underground explosion at the same corner added to the problem. BP, Chevron, and ExxonMobil have since removed half of the spill, about 12,000,000 US gallons (45,000,000 L; 10,000,000 imp gal), from the creek and surrounding area, selling the oil that was removed.

In 1973 the Peter van Iderstine plant which had been turning butcher's discards and at least one 10-ton elephant into fertilizer, animal feed, and glue since 1855 was charged with contaminating the creek with animal fats. The plant closed two years later but the smell of burning animals lingered.

In 1978 a U.S. Coast Guard helicopter on a routine patrol discovered the Greenpoint oil spill, a discharge that lasted another 30 years and spilled in total three times the oil of the Exxon Valdez oil spill.

In the early 2000s, during a construction boom, construction companies dumped concrete slurry into the creek. The city fined Empire Transit Mix in 2005 for ridding itself of its slurry through a secret pipe. The discharges of some other companies had pH levels equal to that of household ammonia.

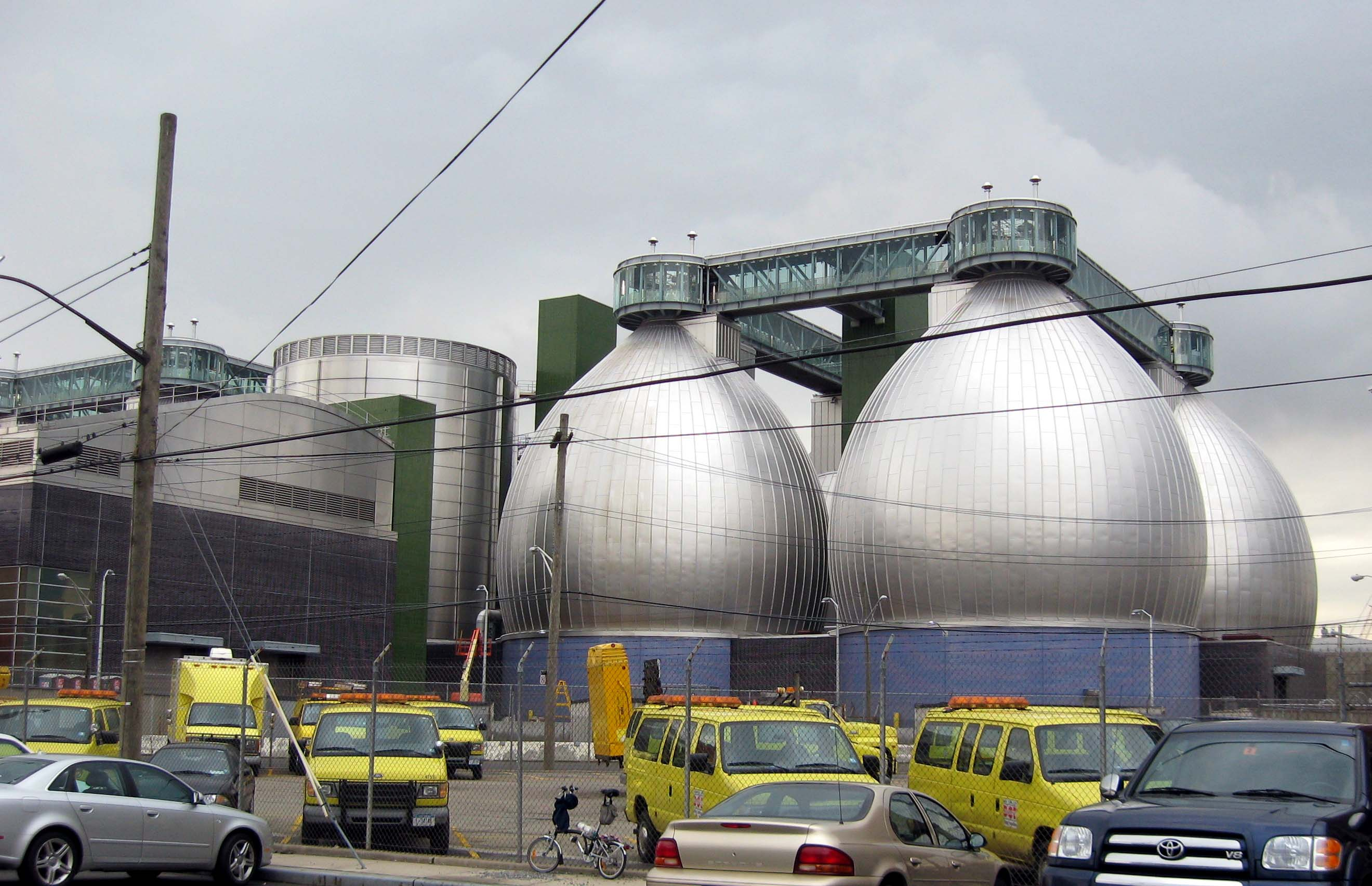
Three "digester eggs" at Newtown Creek Wastewater Treatment Plant

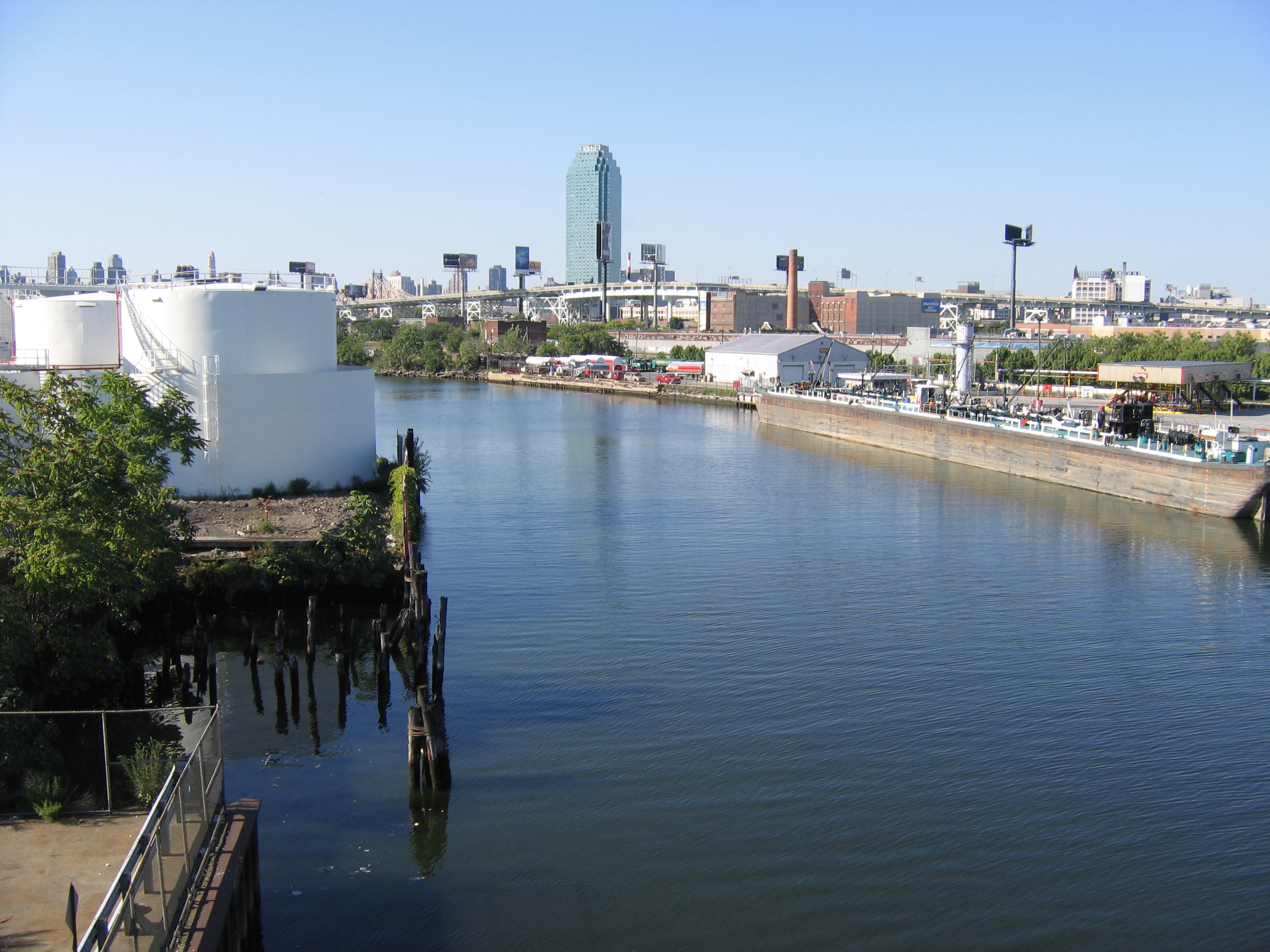
Newtown Creek from the Greenpoint Avenue Bridge

=== Cleanup ===
The first steps towards cleaning up the toxic environment of Newtown Creek came in 1924, when the federal government passed an oil pollution law, albeit one which had been weakened by the industry as it made its way through Congress.

In 1967 the city built the Newtown Creek Wastewater Treatment Plant, which is now the largest sewage treatment facility operated by the New York City Department of Environmental Protection. Located on the south bank near the creek's mouth in Greenpoint, the plant handles a large portion of the drainage from the East Side of Manhattan. Sewage from the Financial District, Greenwich Village, the Lower East Side, Midtown East and the East Side up to 71st Street flows through 180 miles (290 km) of sewer pipes into interceptor pipes to the Thirteenth Street Pumping Station at 13th Street and Avenue D, from where it is sent under the East River to the plant. Normal influx is 170,000,000 US gallons (640,000,000 L; 140,000,000 imp gal) per day, which increases to 300,000,000 US gallons (1.1×10^{9} L; 250,000,000 imp gal) during wet weather. When a significant overflow occurred during the New York City blackout of 1977 [828,000,000 US gallons (3.13×10^{9} L; 689,000,000 imp gal) of raw sewage spilled into the East River], the federal government ordered in 1995 that the city build back-up facilities. Despite this, the Northeast blackout of 2003 produced 145,000,000 US gallons (550,000,000 L; 121,000,000 imp gal) of raw sewage spilled.

In 1998, the city started its program to expand the facility. Construction was completed in 2014, and the plant remained opened throughout the renovation process. The plant's unusual aesthetics, especially its 140-foot (42 meter) tall metallic "digester eggs" which are illuminated at night with blue lights, have made it a local landmark. In part to appease neighborhood residents who initially opposed the plant's expansion, the City of New York built a nature walk alongside Newtown Creek just outside the plant's perimeter in 2009. Later, the North Brooklyn Boat Club built a boatyard and education center with funds from the Exxon's settlement with the state to allow access to the creek.

Even with the expansion of the plant, as of 2014, the city is still not in full compliance with the 1972 federal Clean Water Act, which mandates that secondary treatment should remove 85% of pollutants from incoming sewage, or with New York State's 1992 order for the city to prevent overflows by 2013. Overflows from the Newtown Creek plant on the order of 100,000,000 US gallons (380,000,000 L; 83,000,000 imp gal) occur on the average of once a week.

When sewage loads exceed the capacity of the Newtown Creek Sewage Treatment Facility trash, pesticides, petroleum products, PCBs, mercury, cadmium, lead, pathogenic microorganisms, and nutrients which reduce the dissolved oxygen content of the water are dumped into Newtown Creek. This dumping is referred to as a combined sewer overflow or CSO. CSOs can be triggered by as little as a tenth of an inch of rain.

Essentially anything that gets washed into the gutters from the street, anything that households and businesses flush down the toilet or dump down the drain, has a fair chance of being expelled directly into Newtown Creek or New York Harbor untreated. In New York City a CSO event occurs once a week on average, discharging approximately 500 million gallons of raw sewage directly into New York Harbor. CSOs are the single largest impairment to the quality of New York City's waters.

The city requested a postponement of the 2013 deadline in consideration of its plan to build a fully compliant Newtown Creek plant by 2022.

In 2007, residents of Greenpoint, Brooklyn and the New York State Attorney General's Office filed lawsuits regarding the Greenpoint oil spill. On September 27, 2010, the federal Environmental Protection Agency designated Newtown Creek as a Superfund site, preparing the way for evaluation and environmental remediation of the stream. Environment advocacy groups supported the decision.

The Newtown Creek Nature Walk and its industrial environs attract bird watchers during the migratory seasons.

=== Public projects ===
Plank Road Public Shoreline, located in Queens where 58th Road ends and meets the creek, is a revitalized public access point to the creek founded in 2013 by the Newtown Creek Alliance with support from the NY-NJ Harbor & Estuary Program, the New England Interstate Water Pollution Control Commission (NEIWPCC) and New York State Department of Conservation. The site features a view of the creek with the borough of Manhattan visible on the other side, a short pathway towards the water, a native pollinator garden, mulched pathways and a plaque detailing the historical significance of the site.

=== Murder victims ===
Murderer Joel Rifkin dumped a number of his victims into the creek. They were often stuffed into a barrel.

== Water quality ==
Although the wastewater treatment plant has been expanded, even small amounts of rainfall can overwhelm the system and lead to the dumping of raw sewage and street runoff directly into the creek from 23 different locations. These combined sewer overflows contribute to ongoing pollution of the creek. The margin between rainfall and sewage overflow only thins with the city's further development. In addition, it was reported in December 2013 that in addition to oil and human waste, EPA crews were expected to find toxic substances such as arsenic, caesium-137, and polychlorinated biphenyls.

== Crossings ==
The westernmost crossing of Newtown Creek is the Greenpoint Tube of the New York City Subway's IND Crosstown Line. It was constructed beginning in the late 1920s and opened for passenger traffic in 1933.

The westernmost road crossing of the creek is the Pulaski Bridge, built in 1954 to replace the Vernon Avenue Bridge slightly to the west. Upstream is the Greenpoint Avenue Bridge, built in 1987 to replace bridges that dated to the 1850s. The final bridge upstream, before the convergence of English Kills and the East Branch, is the Kosciuszko Bridge carrying the Brooklyn Queens Expressway (Interstate 278); it was built in 1939 and replaced in 2017–2019.

There are several now-demolished bridges that crossed Newtown Creek. The Vernon Avenue Bridge, connecting Manhattan Avenue in Brooklyn with Vernon Boulevard in Queens, was a Warren truss bridge that existed from 1905 to 1954. The Penny Bridge, near the current site of the Kosciuszko Bridge, was a swing bridge connecting Meeker Avenue in Brooklyn with Laurel Hill Boulevard in Queens. Various forms of the Penny Bridge existed from 1803 until the Kosciuszko Bridge was completed in 1939. Finally, the Maspeth Plank Road bridge connected the two sections of Maspeth Avenue in Brooklyn and Queens just north of where English Kills and the East Branch merge. It was eliminated in the late 19th century, having been deemed an obstruction to navigation.

== Houseboats ==
Several houseboats are docked on the Newtown Creek. These include the MV Schamonchi, a former Martha's Vineyard ferry that ended up in Brooklyn when it was decommissioned and sold in 2005. The Schamonchi served as a squat and a party space, and owners paid to dock it at 190 Morgan. Other boats are rented out to tenants. Most boats are docked on city land, without a marina, so owners do not pay to park their boat. Boat dwellers have faced eviction several times from the city's Small Business Services Department and the Transportation Department.

== See also ==
- Arthur Kill (Staten Island)
- Geography of New York-New Jersey Harbor Estuary
- Gowanus Canal
- Hunters Point, Queens
- List of most-polluted rivers
