= Kosciuszko Bridge =

Bridge in New York City

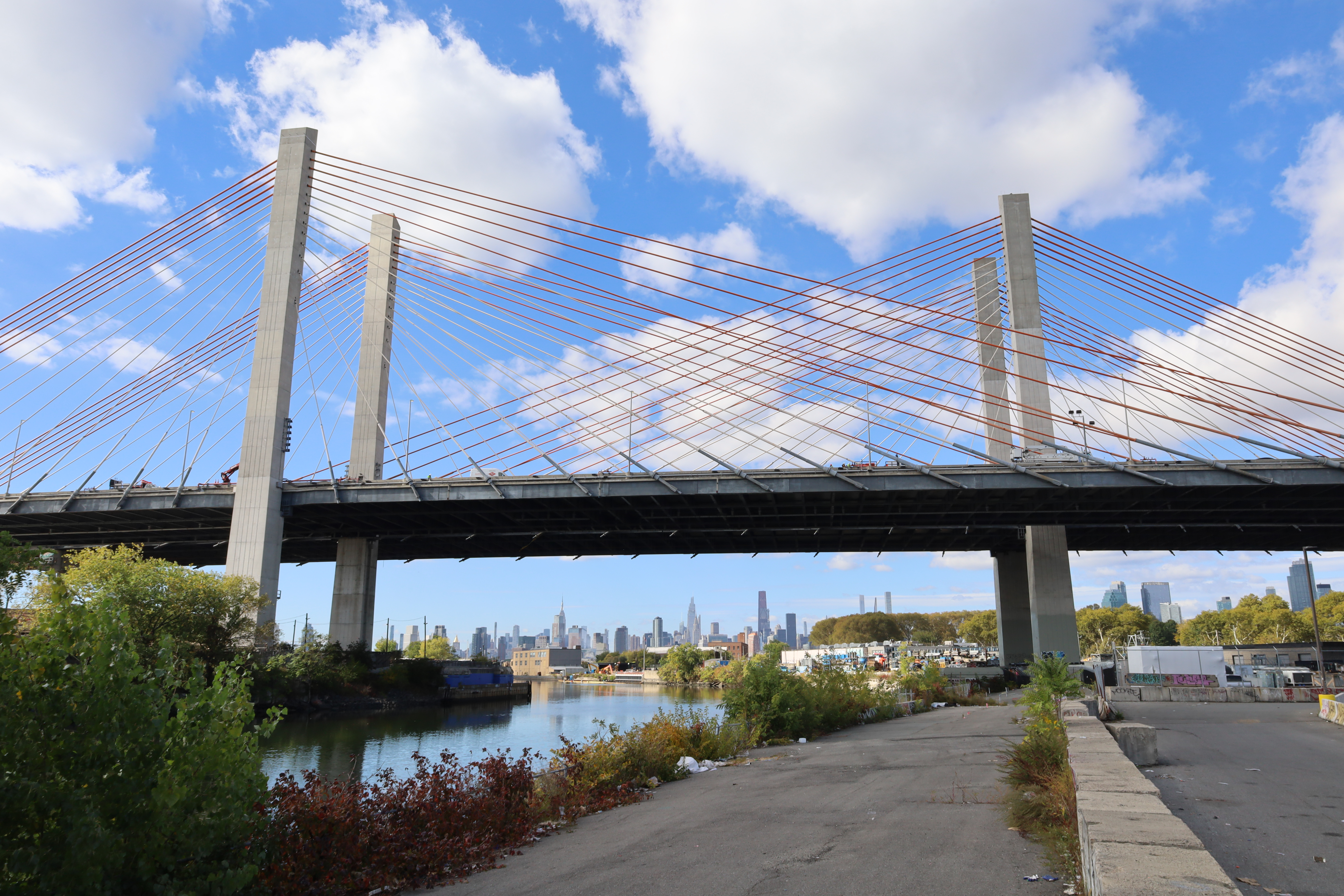
- The bridge in 2025
- Coordinates: 40°43′40″N 73°55′45″W
- Carries: 9 lanes of I-278
- Crosses: Newtown Creek
- Locale: Brooklyn and Queens, New York City
- Maintained by: New York State Department of Transportation
- Preceded by: Greenpoint Avenue Bridge
- Followed by: Grand Street Bridge

Characteristics
- Design: Cable-stayed bridge
- Longest span: 624 feet (190 m)
- Clearance below: 90 feet (27 m)

History
- Opened: April 27, 2017; 9 years ago (eastbound); August 29, 2019; 7 years ago (westbound)

Location
- Interactive map of Kosciuszko Bridge

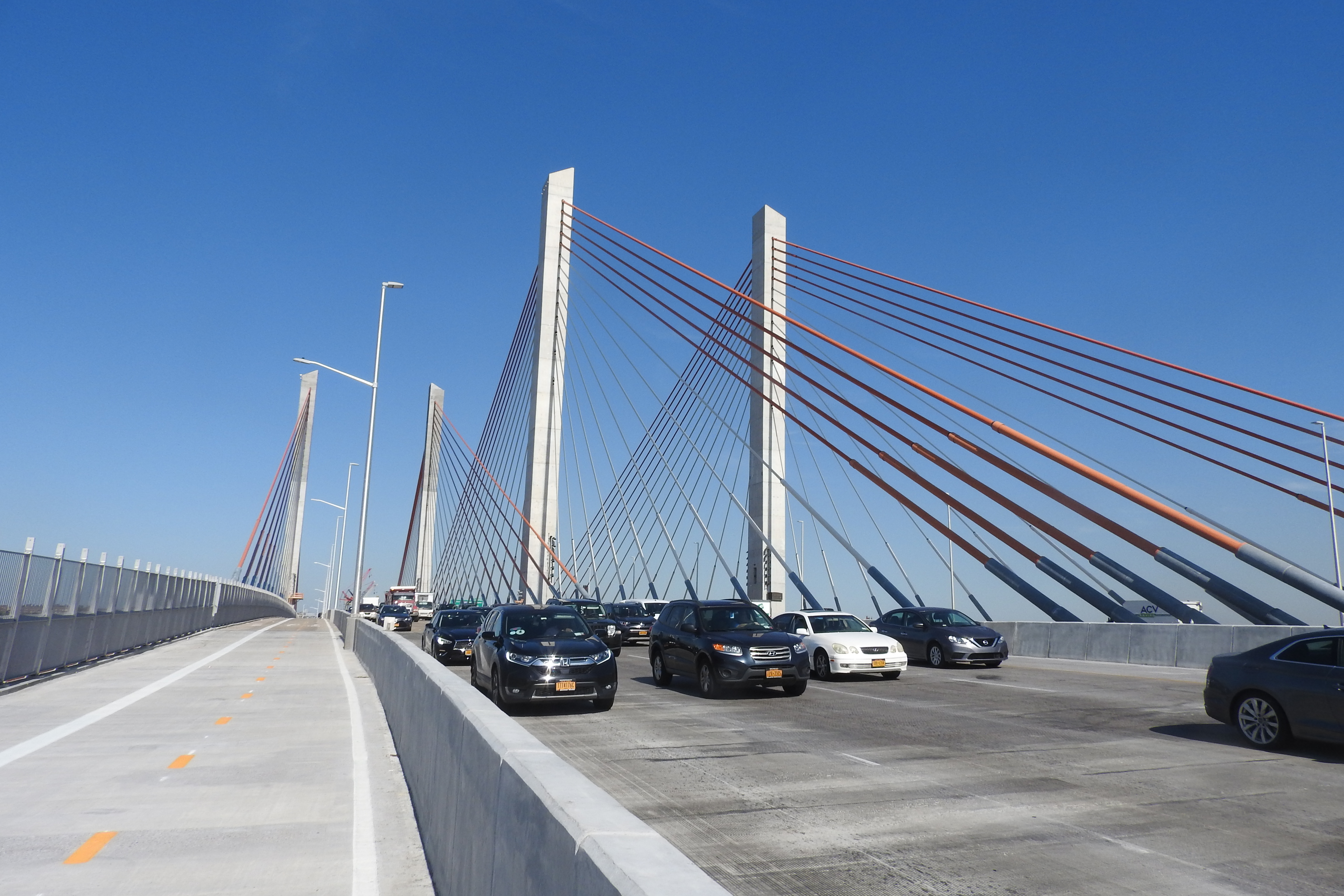
Deck of the current bridge in September 2019. Walkway and bikeway on the left

The Kosciuszko Bridge (/ˌkɒziˈʊskoʊ, ˌkɒʒiˈʊʃkoʊ/ KOZ-ee-UUSK-oh, KOZH-ee-UUSH-koh), originally known as the Meeker Avenue Bridge, is a cable-stayed bridge over Newtown Creek in New York City, connecting Greenpoint in Brooklyn to Maspeth in Queens. The bridge consists of a pair of cable-stayed bridge spans: the eastbound span opened in April 2017, while the westbound span opened in August 2019. An older bridge, a truss bridge of the same name that was located on the site of the westbound cable-stayed span, was originally opened in 1939 and was closed and demolished in 2017. The crossing is part of the Brooklyn–Queens Expressway (BQE), which carries Interstate 278.

The older truss bridge replaced the historical swing bridge which connected Meeker Avenue in Brooklyn to Laurel Hill Boulevard in Queens. The 1939 Kosciuszko Bridge carried six lanes of traffic, three in each direction. In 1940, a year after opening, the bridge was renamed after Polish military leader Tadeusz Kościuszko, who fought alongside the Americans in the American Revolutionary War.

In 2014, a contract was awarded and work begun to build one of two replacement bridges with more capacity, with the first bridge initially carrying bidirectional traffic. The replacement bridges have the same name as the original bridge, and are both cable-stayed bridges that are designed to carry one direction of traffic, though the southern span initially carried both directions. The first bridge, located south of the old truss bridge, opened on April 27, 2017, with three lanes in each direction. Once the old bridge was demolished via controlled explosion in October 2017, a new westbound cable-stayed bridge with four lanes and a bike/pedestrian path started construction on the site of the old bridge. The first cable-stayed bridge became eastbound-only with five lanes when the westbound bridge opened on August 29, 2019.

== Early bridges ==
The first bridge on the site was built in 1803 through an Act of Legislature authorizing the building of a Toll Bridge over Newtown Creek: this bridge charged one cent per foot passenger, which was why the bridge was called the "Penny Bridge." This bridge was built on wood piles.

The second bridge was constructed in 1836 on stone piers. The bridge was operated by private companies until 1888. In 1896, the bridge became the property of the city of Brooklyn and in 1898, upon consolidation, it was taken over by the Department of Bridges of the Greater City of New York.

The third bridge at the site opened in 1894. Also called Meeker Avenue Bridge, the more permanent structure in use since 1894 was still informally known by some as the Penny Bridge. The bridge structures connected Meeker Avenue in Brooklyn to Review Avenue and Laurel Hill Boulevard in Queens. A temporary wooden footbridge collapsed on January 12, 1894 during the construction of the permanent bridge, leading to the death of nine. The bridge was later torn down when construction began on the 1939 bridge.

== 1939 bridge ==
=== Construction ===
Kosciuszko Bridge
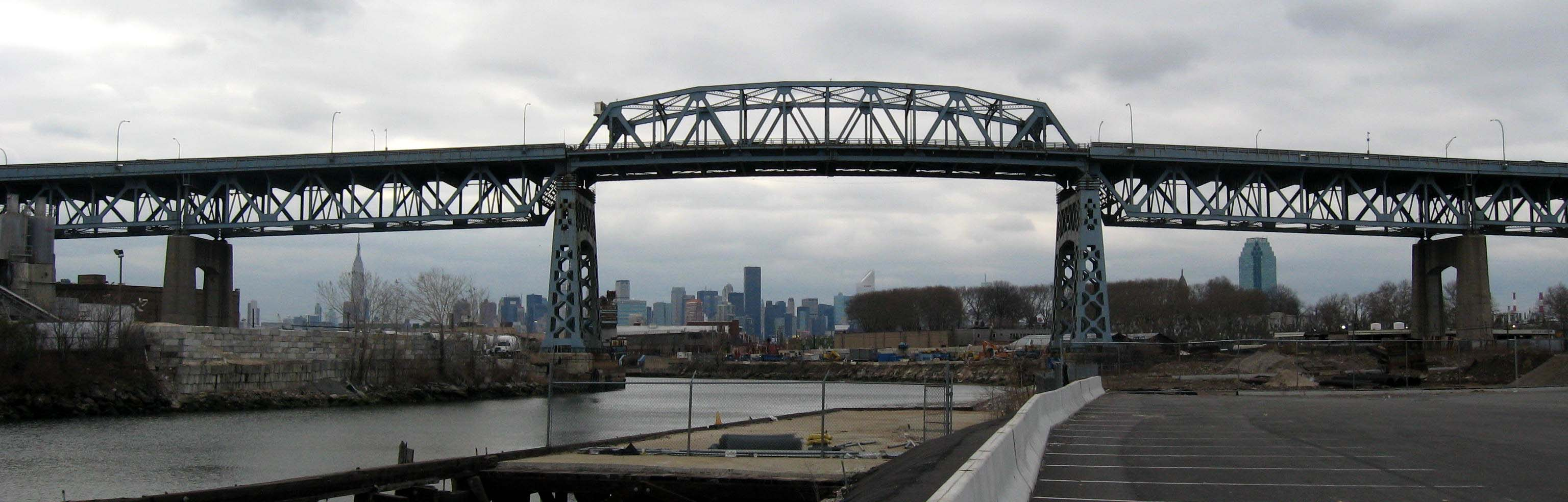
- 1939 bridge as seen from upstream Queens side, 2008
- Coordinates: 40.7277°N 73.9291°W
- Crossed: Newtown Creek
- Locale: Brooklyn and Queens, New York City
- Maintained by: New York State Department of Transportation
- Preceded by: Greenpoint Avenue Bridge
- Followed by: Grand Street Bridge

Characteristics
- Design: Truss bridge
- Total length: 6,021 feet (1,835 m)
- Longest span: 300 feet (91 m)
- Clearance below: 125 feet (38 m)

History
- Opened: August 23, 1939; 87 years ago
- Closed: April 27, 2017; 9 years ago
- Demolished: October 1, 2017; 9 years ago

Statistics
- Daily traffic: 162,581 (2021)

Location
- Interactive map of Kosciuszko Bridge

By the mid-1920s, plans for another replacement of the Meeker Avenue bridge had already been suggested. However, funding for the new bridge was not allocated until 1938, though construction on the new span began almost immediately. At this point, the 1894 span was permanently closed and subsequently dismantled. One person who helped build the new $1.5 million Meeker Avenue Bridge was John Kelly, a former Navy deep-sea diver from Greenpoint, Brooklyn. In 1938, he completed his task of building a cofferdam, a box-like structure made of 250 steel sheets. This enabled workmen to operate and build an underwater pier in dry surroundings on the Brooklyn side of the new bridge. After that, Kelly began cutting away cofferdam bracings on the Queens side, at Laurel Hill Boulevard and Review Avenue. One of the tools he worked with was an underwater-operated cutting torch that burned oxygen, hydrogen, and compressed air. The new Bridge was formally opened to traffic on August 23, 1939. It was built at a cost of $6 million to $13 million (equal to between $139,000,000 and $301,000,000 in 2025 dollars). The Meeker Avenue Bridge's design and form were vastly different from the first Meeker Avenue Bridge. The earlier was a swing drawbridge and carried a two-lane, 20-foot-wide (6.1 m) roadway and two sidewalks. The new bridge carried two three-lane concrete roadways each 32 feet (9.8 m) wide and separated by a 4-foot (1.2 m) median, as well as sidewalks. This new bridge structure contained 16,315 short tons (14,801 t) of steel, along with 88,120 cubic yards (67,370 m^{3}) of concrete masonry.

The city government officially renamed the new bridge after Tadeusz Kościuszko, a Polish general in the American Revolutionary War, on July 10, 1940. On September 22, 1940, months after the conquest of Poland, Mayor Fiorello La Guardia led a renaming ceremony. The naming occurred in the presence of 15,000 people, mainly Polish-American residents and city and state government representatives, some stating that the spirit of Polish liberty would never die. There were parades at both ends of the bridge, and La Guardia unveiled plaques that commemorated the new name. The mayor described President Franklin D. Roosevelt, like Kościuszko, as a "champion of liberty during a difficult period", referring to the World War II occupation of Poland by Germany. He also stated, "I am confident that Poland will live again. Any land that breeds such lovers of freedom can never be kept enslaved. The Polish people may be captive, but the flaming spirit of Polish liberty will never be destroyed." Two of the bridge towers were surmounted with eagles, one with the Polish eagle and the other the American eagle.

=== Operation ===
A repaving project in 1958 temporarily made the bridge a one-way operation for five months. Only Queens-bound traffic was allowed during afternoons and evenings, while only Brooklyn-bound traffic was permitted at all other times.

In 1960, the bridge was designated as part of I-278.

In 1965, a project to widen the Kosciuszko Bridge and reconstruction of the Brooklyn–Queens Expressway (BQE) and Long Island Expressway (LIE) interchanges into rebuilt into an incomplete partial cloverleaf interchange, began, and would cost $32.7 million. The BQE was also being rebuilt from Cherry Street, at the Brooklyn end of the bridge, to Queens Boulevard, and a small section of the LIE was reconstructed near its interchange with the BQE, between Van Dam Street and Maurice Avenue. Because of this, the original bridge's sidewalks were removed to make way for a widened roadway. All of these projects were completed in 1967, and also included the installation of a median barrier, replacement of the concrete deck, and other miscellaneous improvements.

In 1996, a project to reinforce the concrete piers began. It was completed in 1999.

In 2000, a project to improve the structural system was completed.

In 2005, a pavement rehab project was completed, also included as part of this project was deck and ramp repairs.

The 1939 bridge, which was meant to serve 10,000 vehicles per day, carried 18 times that amount of traffic when it became part of the Interstate Highway System. It was not up to Interstate standards since it did not have any drainage pipes or shoulders.

== Current bridge ==
=== Planning ===
By the 1990s, the old bridge, still not up to carrying interstate traffic, was deteriorating and heavily congested. After an 18-month study in 1994–1995, State Transportation Department officials concluded that in order to relieve congestion on the busy span, a new $100 million bridge, which included an additional three lanes, should be built next to the original six-lane Kosciuszko Bridge. This new bridge would be part of a renovation project planned for the entire crossing. DOT Supervisor Peter King stated that this new bridge may be required to avoid severe traffic backups on neighborhood streets surrounding the bridge during renovation of the Kosciuszko. King felt that in order to resolve the increasing number of severely congested streets and intersections, "a second parallel span" may be the answer.

In 2008, it was discovered that two Native American tribes indigenous to Queens, the Matinecocks and the Canarsies, were not informed of the bridge replacement project under federal law. The Delaware Nation, in Oklahoma, and the Stockbridge-Munsee, in Wisconsin, both originally native to New York City, were given a month to comment on the bridge project, in addition to the Matinecocks and the Canarsies.

In 2009, it was decided to replace the 1939 structure with a new bridge, which was to consist of a five-lane eastbound span, a four-lane westbound span, a bike path, and a walkway. Four designs were considered for the new structure: a cable-stayed bridge, a through arch bridge, a box girder bridge, and a deck arch bridge. The cable-stayed bridge design, selected after a public review process, made the replacement bridge the first vehicular cable-stayed bridge in New York City since the Brooklyn Bridge (which has a hybrid suspension/cable-stayed design), as well as the first major new bridge in New York City since the Verrazzano–Narrows Bridge's completion in 1964.

=== Construction of eastbound bridge ===
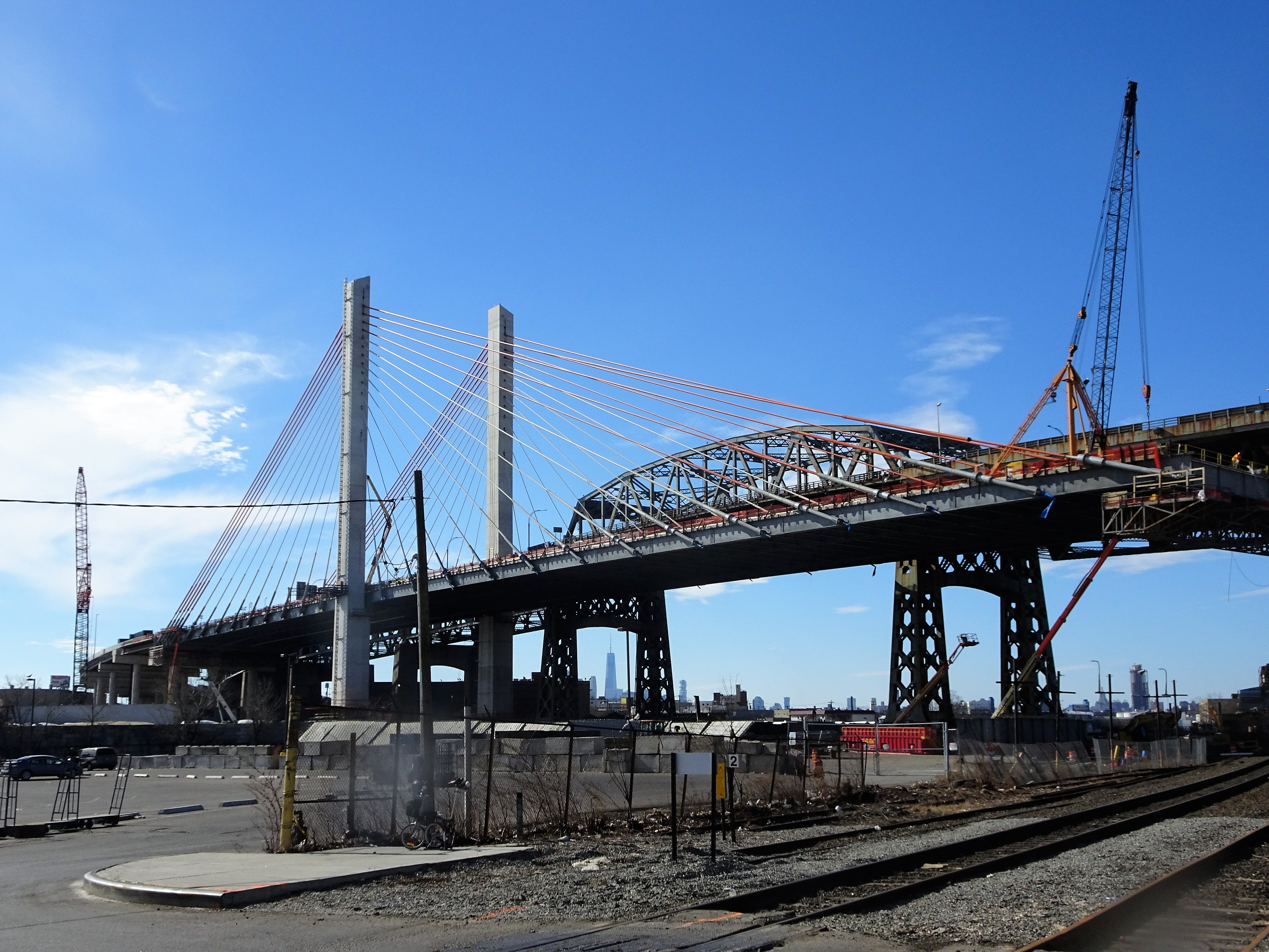
New and old Kosciuszko bridges in February 2017. New cable-stayed bridge is in foreground left. The 1939 truss bridge is behind it and right.

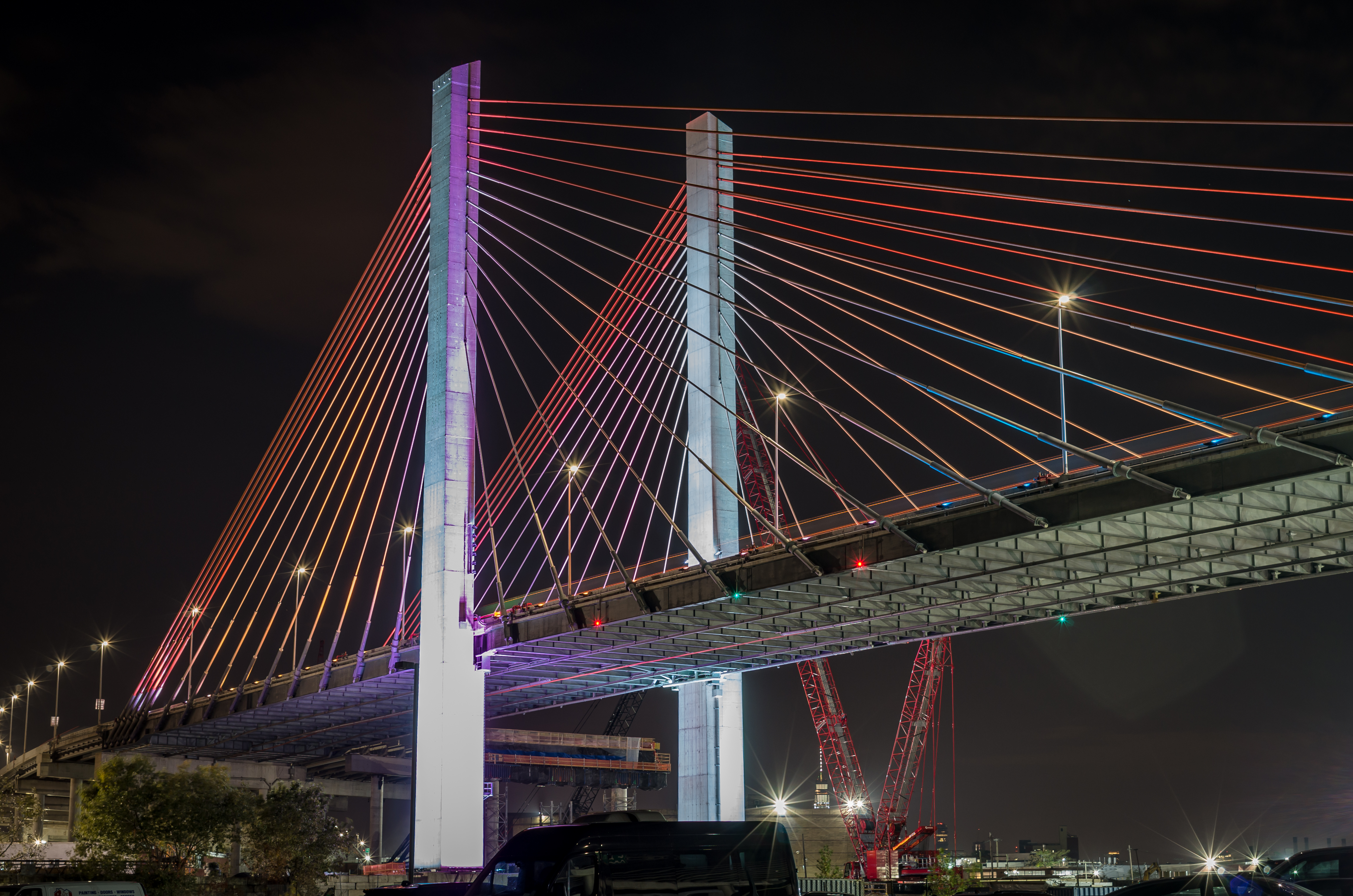
Seen at night, October 2018

Construction was originally expected to begin in 2013, but was then delayed to winter 2014. About 140 trees were removed on both sides of the bridge in April 2014 in preparation for the rebuilding, though twice the number of trees were to be replanted once the bridge's reconstruction was completed.

On May 23, 2014, a $554.77 million design-build contract, for the construction of the eastbound span and demolition of the old bridge was awarded to a team consisting of Skanska, which will be managing partner; Ecco III of Yonkers; Kiewit Corporation of Nebraska; and HNTB of Kansas as the lead design firm. It is the largest single contract ever awarded by the New York State Department of Transportation. The work involved building a new eastbound viaduct, which was completed in 2017; the existing eastbound structure would then be demolished. The westbound viaduct would then be completed by 2020. The new bridges are being built since the Kosciuszko Bridge is known as a notorious traffic bottleneck; according to The New York Times, it is "perhaps the city's most notorious [bridge], hated and feared by drivers and synonymous in traffic reports with bottlenecks, stop-and-go and general delay." The bridges would reduce delays by up to 65% during rush hours, as well as provide a new pedestrian/bicycle connection between the boroughs.

On December 4, 2014, work began on the eastbound bridge, which entailed temporarily narrowing the Meeker Avenue entrance on the Brooklyn side on the bridge in order to widen it in the long run. Work was to take place in the daytime, temporarily causing more traffic congestion. By August 2015, the two pylons for the eastbound bridge, as well as part of the bridge structure, were under construction. The 287-foot-high (87 m) pylons were sunk 150 to 185 feet (46 to 56 m), with each pylon resting on four foundations at that depth. After the pylons were completed, a supporting steel-and-concrete deck section called a pier table was built between the two pylons. The other deck sections were then built outward from the pier table, with two cables supporting each section, creating a 1,001-foot-long (305 m) deck supported by 56 cables in total. A 4,000-short-ton (3,600-long-ton) counterweight was built under the western section of the eastbound bridge since the eastern section was longer and heavier. The new bridge was built to withstand a century's worth of traffic.

The new eastbound bridge, which initially hosted both directions of traffic, opened ahead of schedule on April 27, 2017, with a ceremony attended by Governor Andrew Cuomo. The bridge is the first of several bridges citywide to feature an advanced lighting system – part of Governor Cuomo's "New York Harbor of Lights" initiative – which would allow the bridge to display light shows as a tourist attraction. At that time, five of six lanes of traffic were shifted to the new bridge, with a single lane of westbound traffic temporarily using the old bridge until the end of the month. The new bridge kept the same name as the original.

=== Demolition of 1939 bridge ===
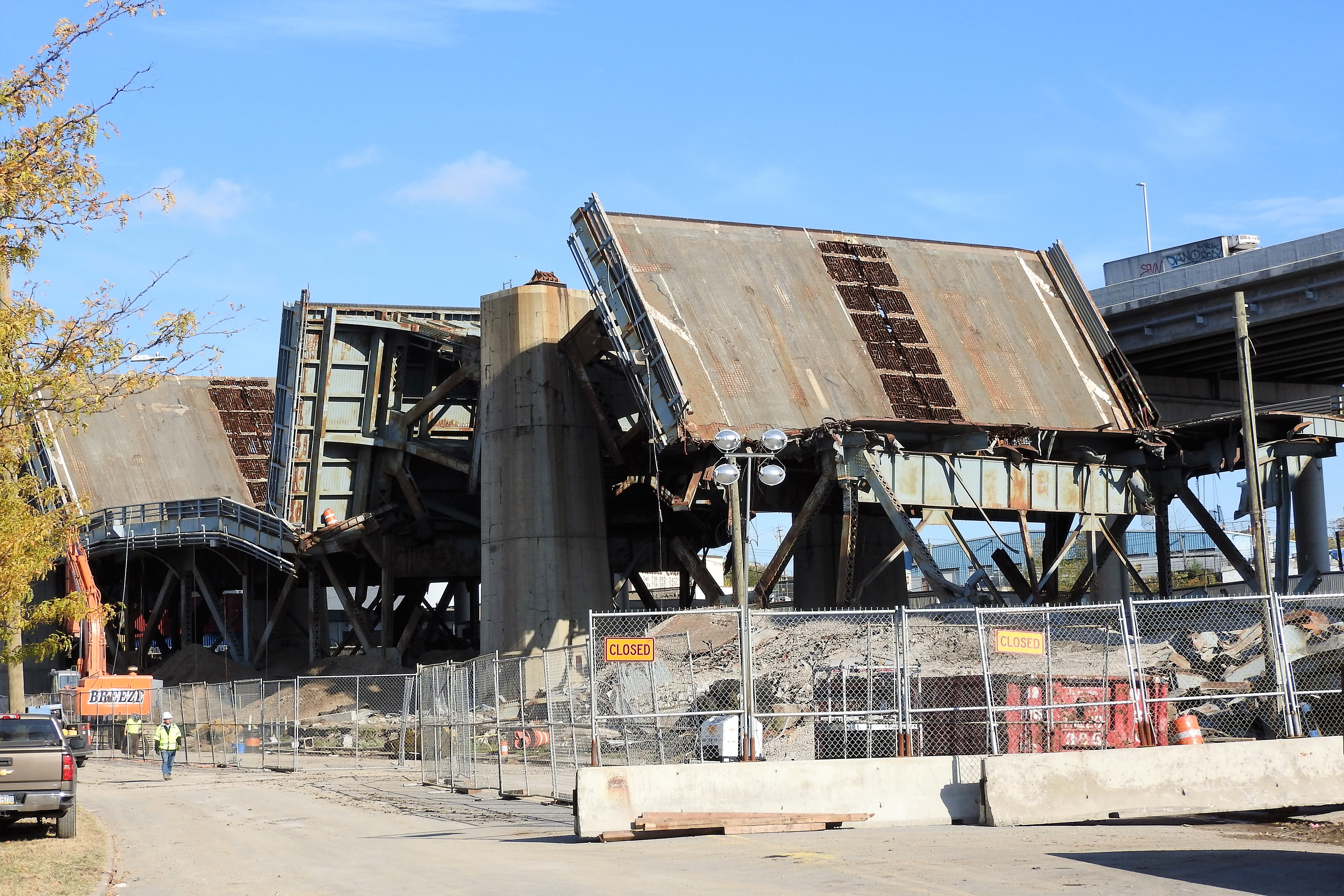
collapsed remains of the 1939 bridges approach at the Queens (east) end

Part of the original structure was set to be demolished by controlled explosion in summer 2017 so that work on the new westbound bridge could begin soon after. This type of demolition, beginning with Governor Cuomo personally pushing the button to detonate the bridge, saved seven to nine months compared to if the entire bridge had been carefully dismantled. The new westbound span and pedestrian/bike lanes would be ready in 2020, providing the bridge with extra traffic capacity. Initial reports speculated that the explosion date would be July 11. Instead, the main span of the bridge was lowered onto a barge, and the approaches would then be exploded. This updated plan was meant to be environmentally friendly since less of the bridge would be scattered into the creek below. At the time there was no date set for the actual demolition.

The old bridge's main span was lowered onto two barges tied together, and on July 26, 2017, the main span was shipped to New Jersey to be recycled. This marked the completion of the first phase of the old bridge's demolition. The approaches to the former main span were demolished on October 1, 2017, with the detonation of 944 small explosive charges. This was the largest explosive demolition in New York City and the first of a bridge there. The state would recycle the twenty trusses from the approaches, which weigh a combined 22,000,000 pounds (10,000,000 kg).

=== Construction of westbound bridge ===
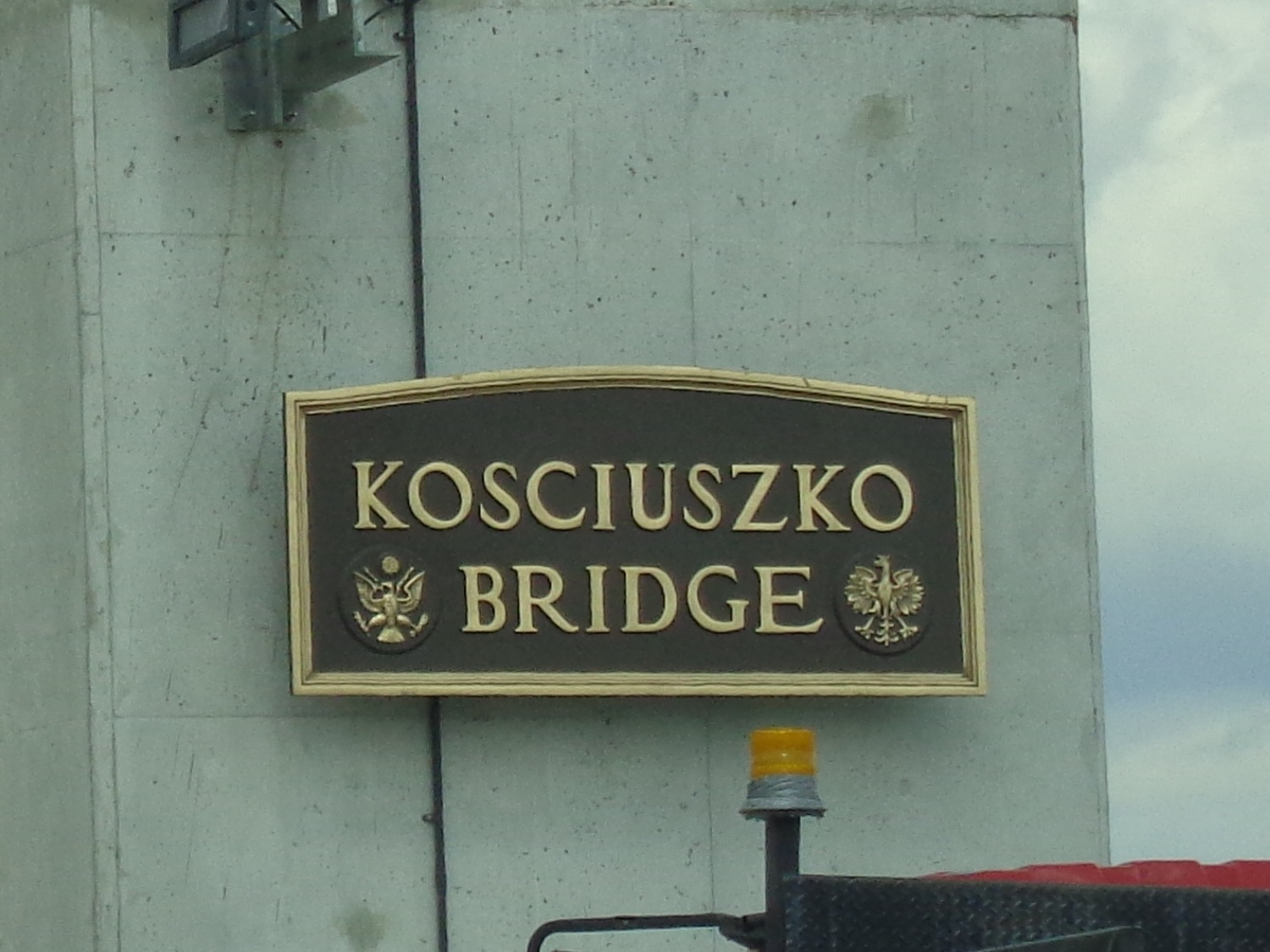
The nameplate of the Kosciuszko Bridge

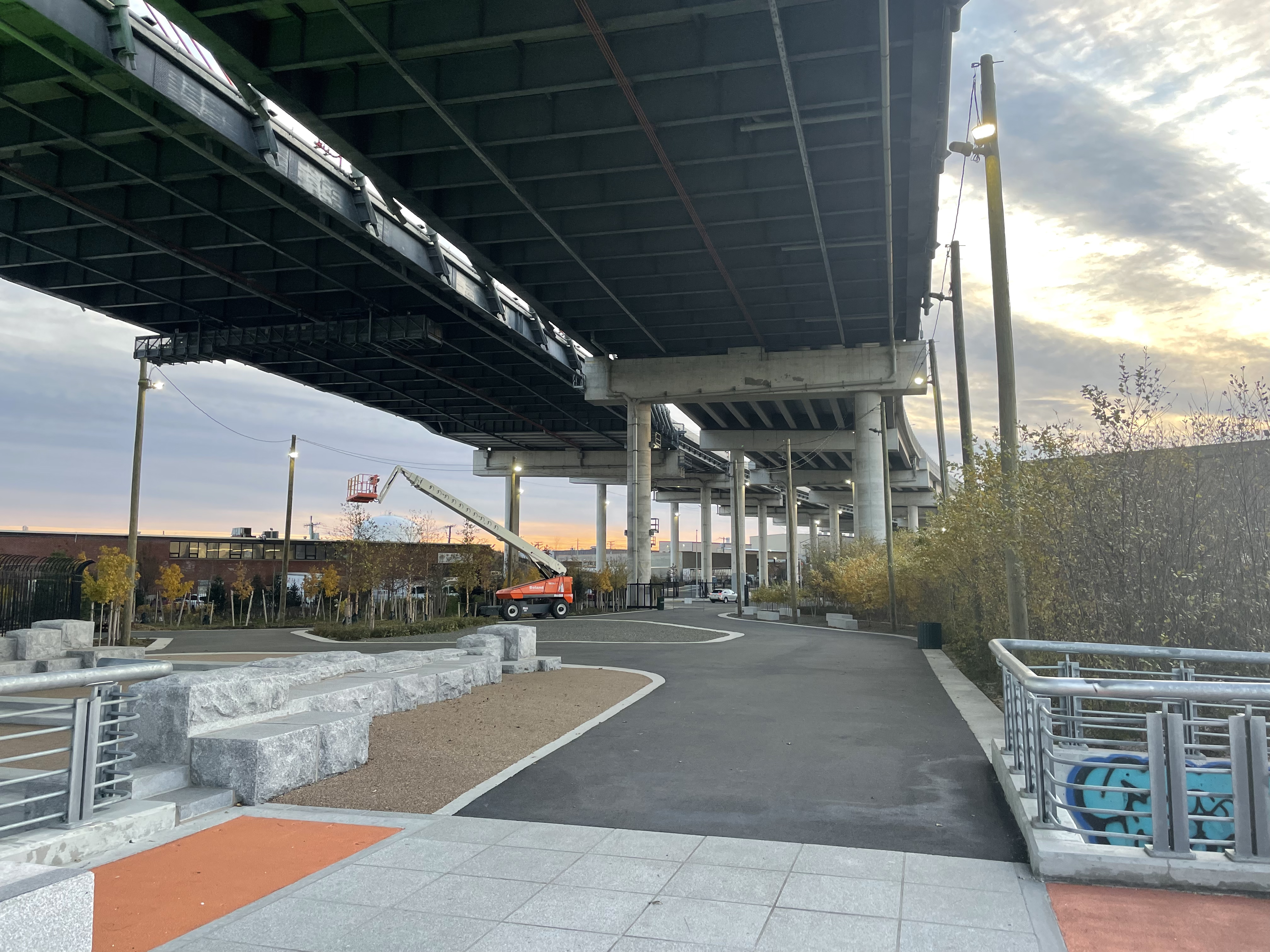
Under The K Bridge Park in 2021

Afterward, construction started on the westbound bridge. Construction of the westbound bridge was performed by Granite Construction of California and COWI Engineering. Work progressed quickly, and in May 2019, Cuomo announced that the westbound bridge would open by that September. The opening date of the westbound bridge was later revised to August 29, 2019. The westbound bridge opened as scheduled on that date, though pedestrians and bicyclists were allowed to cross the day before.

As part of the construction of the westbound span, it was announced that a 7-acre (2.8 ha) park would be built in the unused space beneath the Brooklyn approach, and would open in 2020. The park, to be named "Under the K", would contain four segments: a pathway called the Arm, a multi-use zone called K-flex 1, a performance space called K-flex 2, and a waterfront seating area called Creekside. In 2022, a set of plaques dedicated to Tadeusz Kościuszko were dedicated on the bridge.

Following the opening of the westbound bridge, bicyclists' advocacy groups pointed out that there was not enough bike infrastructure connecting to either end of the bridge, especially since both ends were in primarily industrial neighborhoods. The city planned to install short, on-street bike lanes leading to both ends of the bridge. In response, comptroller Scott Stringer said that there needed to be "protected bike lanes", completely segregated from traffic, on both sides of the bridge.

== See also ==
- List of bridges and tunnels in New York City
