= Brooklyn directories =

Directories of Brooklyn, Kings County, New York

On January 1, 1898, New York City absorbed East Bronx, Brooklyn, western Queens County, and Staten Island (see Timeline of Brooklyn). For Brooklyn directories that are combined with Manhattan – before and after being incorporated with New York City – see New York City directories.

Brooklyn in the middle 19th century was a commercial rival of New York City.

== Timeline, highlights, and creators ==
1822:	Alden Spooner (1783–1848), in 1822, published the first full Brooklyn city directory. One of Spooner's granddaughters, Caroline Augusta Huling (1856–1941), was a notable journalist, philanthropist, editor, publisher, and reformer. Also, Alden Spooner → ascending line: Judah Paddock Spooner (1748–1807), Thomas Spooner (1718–1767), John Spooner (1668–1728), John Spooner (1648–1734), William Spooner (1621–1683) — was a second cousin twice removed of Joshua Spooner (1745–1778) → ascending line: John Spooner (1696–1763), Ebenzer Spooner (1666–1717), William Spooner (1621–1683) — a wealthy farmer and husband of Bathsheba Spooner (née Bathsheba Ruggles; 1746–1778), the first woman to be executed in the United States following the Declaration of Independence.
1859:	The printing firm Wynkoop, Hallenbeck & Thomas was founded in 1859 as a co-partnership of (i) Matthew Bennett Wynkoop (1830–1895), (ii) John Johnson Hallenbeck (1817–1891), and (iii) John Thomas. Wynkoop managed the finances. Thomas retired in 1864 and Wynkoop and Hallenbeck, between themselves, resumed a co-partnership, Wynkoop & Hallenbeck. Wynkoop and Hallenbeck were members of the Typothetae of New York, a master printers union. Wynkoop was a 2nd great grand nephew of Benjamin Wynkoop (1673–1751), early American silversmith of New York City.
1873:	Frederick William Beers (1839–1933), the cartographer who supervised the work of Atlas of Long Island, was one of several Beers family publishers who, after the Civil War, published state and county atlases. Frederick's father, James Botsford Beers (1811–1901), and uncle, Daniel Glover Beers (1841–1913), had their own publishing companies. Distinctive features of the Atlas of Long Island include notations of property owners, buildings, businesses, and statistical information.
1883:	The Brooklyn Bridge opened May 24, 1883, spanning the East River between Brooklyn and Lower Manhattan. It was the first bridge that connected Brooklyn to Manhattan – in a neighborhood that eventually became known as Two Bridges.
1909:	The Manhattan Bridge opened December 31, 1909, spanning the East River between Brooklyn and Lower Manhattan. It is the second bridge that belongs to the neighborhood name, "Two Bridges".

=== Brooklyn (Kings County) directories ===
The Brooklyn Public Library (BPL) has put Brooklyn City Directories online on a collection on the internet archive (from 1822 onward with some years missing). See also the table below.

Year	Title	Printer	Compiler(s)	Google Books	HathiTrust	Internet Archive	Other
1796	Brooklyn Directory (3 pages, only)	John Buel (1768–1800); John Bull (printers); Re-published by John Disturnell (1801–1877)	John Low			Columbia	
1822	Spooner's Brooklyn Directory for the year 1822.	Alden Spooner (1783–1848) (publisher)				Internet Archive (Brooklyn Public Library [BPL] microfiche scan)	
1823	Spooner's Brooklyn Directory, for the Year 1823.	Alden Spooner (publisher)		British Library		Internet Archive (BPL microfiche scan)	
1824	Spooner's Brooklyn Directory, for 1824	Alden Spooner (publisher)				Internet Archive (BPL microfiche scan)	
1825	Spooner's Brooklyn Directory, for 1825	Alden Spooner (publisher)				Internet Archive (BPL microfiche scan)	
1826	Spooner's Brooklyn Directory, for 1826	Alden Spooner (publisher)				Internet Archive (BPL microfiche scan)	
1827	No directory published						
1828	No directory published						
1829	Spooner's Brooklyn Directory, for 1829					Internet Archive (BPL microfiche scan)	
1830	Brooklyn Directory, for the year 1830	Alden Spooner (Printer)	By Lewis Nichols [compiler?]			Internet Archive (BPL microfiche scan)	
1831-1832	Brooklyn Directory for 1831-32	Alden Spooner (Printer)	By Lewis Nichols [compiler?]			Internet Archive (BPL microfiche scan)	
1832-1833	Brooklyn Directory for 1832-33.	William Bigelow (publisher) A. Spooner (printer)				Internet Archive (BPL microfiche scan)	
1833-1834	Brooklyn Directory for 1833-34	Nichols and Dalaree (Publisher) Lewis Nichols (Printer)				Internet Archive (BPL microfiche scan)	
1833–1834	Brooklyn Directory of 1833–34	Brooklyn Daily Eagle (publisher) (1934 re-print)					A – H H – S S – Z (courtesy bklyn-genealogy-info.stevemorse.org)
1834-1835							
1835-1836	Brooklyn Directory, for 1835-36.	Lewis Nichols (publisher) Lewis Nichols (printer)				Internet Archive (BPL microfiche scan)	
1836-1837	Brooklyn Directory, for the Years 1836-37.	A. Spooner & Sons (printer)	By Lewis Nichols [compiler?]			Internet Archive (BPL microfiche scan)	
1837-1838	Brooklyn Directory, for the Years 1837-38.	A. Spooner & Sons (printer)	By Lewis Nichols [compiler?]			Internet Archive (BPL microfiche scan)	
1838-1839	Brooklyn Directory, for the Years 1838-39.	A. G. Stevens & Wm. H. Marschalk (publisher) Arnold & Van Anden (printer)				Internet Archive (BPL microfiche scan)	
1839-1840	Brooklyn Directory for the Years 1839–40.	Henry Lot Ogden (1800–1888) (publisher); Arnold & Van Anden (Samuel G. Arnold; 1806–1891) (Isaac Van Anden; 1812–1875) (printer)	Henry Lot Ogden (compiler)		Harvard	Allen County Public Library Internet Archive (BPL microfiche scan)	
1840-1841	Brooklyn Directory and Yearly Advertiser, for 1840-1.	Stationers' Hall Works	Thomas Leslie & John W. Leslie, & William F. Chichester (compiler)			Internet Archive (BPL microfiche scan)	
1841-1842	Brooklyn Alphabetical and Street Directory and Yearly Advertiser, for 1841-2.	Thomas Leslie & John W. Leslie (publisher)	Thomas Leslie & John W. Leslie (compiler)			Internet Archive (BPL microfiche scan)	
1842-1843	Brooklyn Directory for 1842 & 3.					Internet Archive (Yale)	
1843-1844	Brooklyn Alphabetical and Street Directory, and Yearly Advertiser for 1843 & 4 (Vol. 2)	Thomas Leslie; Henry R. Hearne; William J. Hearne (co-publisher); Stationers' Hall Works (co-publisher)	Thomas Leslie; Henry R. Hearne; William J. Hearne (compiler)		HathiTrust	Internet Archive (Columbia)	
1844-1845	Brooklyn Alphabetical and Street Directory, and Yearly Advertiser for 1844 & 5.	Henry R. Hearne; William J. Hearne Edwin Von Nostrand (publisher); Stationers' Hall Works	Henry R. Hearne; William J. Hearne Edwin Von Nostrand (compiler)			Internet Archive (BPL microfiche scan)	
1845-1846	Brooklyn City Directory for 1845 and 1846.	Silas H. Crowell (publisher) Douglas (printer)				Internet Archive (BPL microfiche scan)	
1845-1846	Brooklyn Alphabetical & Street Directory, and Yearly Advertiser for 1845 & 6.	Henry R. Hearne William J. Hearne (publisher) Stationers' Hall Works	Henry R. Hearne; William J. Hearne (compiler)			Internet Archive (BPL microfiche scan)	
1846-1847	Brooklyn Directory, and Yearly Advertiser for 1846 & 7	Henry R. & Edwin Van Nostrand (publisher) Lees & Foulkes (printer)	Henry R. & Edwin Van Nostrand (compiler)			Internet Archive (BPL microfiche scan)	
1847-1848	Brooklyn Directory, and Yearly Advertiser for 1847-8	William J. Hearne & James E. Webb (publisher) Lees & Foulkes (printers)	William J. Hearne & James E. Webb (compiler)			Internet Archive (BPL microfiche scan)	
1848-1849	[Spooner's] Brooklyn City Directory, and Annual Advertiser, for the Years 1848-9.	E.B. Spooner (Edwin Bolton Spooner; 1808–1876) (publisher); F.B. Spooner (Frances Bowman Spooner; 1798–1862) (printer)	Thomas P. Teale (compiler)	Google Books		Internet Archive (Columbia)	
1848-1849	[Hearne's] Brooklyn City Directory and Annual Advertiser, for the Years 1848-9 [...] Also, A Street Directory	Henry R. & William J. Hearne (publisher) Lees & Foulkes (printers)	Henry R. & William J. Hearne (compiler)			Internet Archive (Brooklyn Public Library, Microfiche scan)	
1849-1850	[Hearne's] Brooklyn City Directory and Annual Advertiser, for 1849 & '50, [...] Also, a Street Directory	Henry R. & William J. Hearne (publisher) Lees & Foulkes (printers)	Henry R. & William J. Hearne (compiler)			Internet Archive (Brooklyn Public Library, Microfiche scan)	
1850-1851	Hearnes' Brooklyn Directory for 1850–1851 (Vol. 9)	Henry R. and William J. Hearne (publisher); Lees & Foulkes (Henry A. Lees; died 1851) (printer)				Internet Archive (Columbia)	
1851-1852	Hearnes' Brooklyn City Directory, for 1851-1852 (Vol. 10)	Henry R. & William J. Hernes (publisher) Lees & Foulkes (printers)				Internet Archive (Brooklyn Public Library, microfiche scan)	
1852-1853	Hearnes' Brooklyn Directory for 1852–1853 (Vol. 11)	Henry R. and William J. Hearne (publisher); William L. Foulkes (printer)				Internet Archive (Columbia scan)	
1853-1854	Hearnes' Brooklyn Directory for 1853–1854 (Vol. 12)	Henry R. and William J. Hearne (publisher); William L. Foulkes (printer)		Google Books		Internet Archive (Brooklyn Public Library, microfiche scan)	
1854-1855	Smith's Brooklyn City Directory, for 1854 &1855	William H. Smith (publisher)	William H. Smith (compiler)			Internet Archive (BPL, microfiche scan)	
1855-1856	Smith's Brooklyn Directory	William H. Smith (publisher)	William H. Smith (compiler)			Internet Archive (BPL)	
1856-1857	Smith's Brooklyn Directory	Charles Jenkins (publisher)	William H. Smith (compiler)			Internet Archive (BPL)	
1857-1858	The Brooklyn City Directory	J. Lain & Company (Jonathan Lain; 1813–1867) (publisher); Edward O. Jenkins (printer)	J. Lain (compiler)			Internet Archive (BPL)	
1858-1859	The Brooklyn City Directory	J. Lain & company (publisher)	J. Lain (compiler)			Internet Archive (Yale scan)	
1859-1860	The Brooklyn City Directory	J. Lain & company (publisher) Wynkoop, Hallenbeck & Thomas (printers)	J. Lain (compiler)			Internet Archive (Brooklyn Public Library, microfiche scan)	
1860-1861	The Brooklyn City Directory	J. Lain & company (publisher) Wynkoop, Hallenbeck & Thomas (printers)	J. Lain (compiler)			Internet Archive (Brooklyn Public Library, microfiche scan)	
1861-1862	The Brooklyn City Directory	J. Lain & Company (publisher); Wynkoop, Hallenbeck & Thomas (Matthew B. Wynkoop) (John J. Hallenbeck) (William E. Hallenbeck) (printers)	J. Lain (compiler)			Internet Archive (BPL)	
1862-1863	The Brooklyn City Directory	J. Lain & Company (publisher); Wynkoop, Hallenbeck & Thomas (printers)	J. Lain (compiler)			Internet Archive (BPL)	
1863-1864	The Brooklyn City Directory	J. Lain & Company (publisher)	J. Lain (compiler)		HathiTrust	Internet Archive (BPL)	
1864-1865	The Brooklyn City Directory	J. Lain & Company (publisher); Wynkoop & Hallenbeck (printer)	J. Lain (compiler)			Internet Archive (BPL)	
1865-1866	The Brooklyn City Directory	J. Lain & Company (publisher); Wynkoop & Hallenbeck (printer)	J. Lain (compiler)			Internet Archive (BPL)	
1866-1867	The Brooklyn City Directory	J. Lain & Company (publisher); Wynkoop & Hallenbeck (printer)	J. Lain (compiler)			Internet Archive (BPL)	
1867-1868	The Brooklyn City Directory	Lain & Company; George Theodore Lain (1844–1893) (proprietor)	George Theodore Lain (1844–1893) (compiler)		HathiTrust	Internet Archive (BPL)	
1868-1869	The Brooklyn City Directory	Lain & Company; George Theodore Lain (1844–1893) (proprietor)				Internet Archive (BPL)	
1869-1870	The Brooklyn City Directory	Lain & Company; George Theodore Lain (1844–1893) (proprietor)		Google Books		Internet Archive (Yale scan)	
1870-1871	The Brooklyn City Directory	Lain & Company; George Theodore Lain (1844–1893) (proprietor)				Internet Archive (BPL)	
1871-1872	The Brooklyn City Directory	Lain & Company; George Theodore Lain (1844–1893) (proprietor)	Geo. T. Lain (compiler)			Internet Archive (Yale scan)	
1872-1873							
1873-1874							
1874-1875	The Brooklyn City Directory	Lain & Company; George Theodore Lain (1844–1893) (proprietor)				Internet Archive (BPL)	
1875-1876	The Brooklyn City Directory	Lain & Company; George Theodore Lain (1844–1893) (proprietor)				Internet Archive (BPL)	
1876-1877	The Brooklyn City Directory	Lain & Company; George Theodore Lain (1844–1893) (proprietor)				Internet Archive (Yale scan)	
1877-1878	The Brooklyn City Directory	Lain & Company; George Theodore Lain (1844–1893) (proprietor)	George Theodore Lain (1844–1893) (compiler)			Internet Archive (BPL)	
1878-1879	The Brooklyn City Directory	Lain & Company; George Theodore Lain (1844–1893) (proprietor)	George Theodore Lain (1844–1893) (compiler)			Internet Archive (BPL)	
1879-1880	The Brooklyn City Directory					Internet Archive (BPL)	
1880-1881	The Brooklyn City Directory						
1881-1882	The Brooklyn City Directory						
1882-1883	The Brooklyn City Directory	Lain & Company; George Theodore Lain (1844–1893) (proprietor)	George Theodore Lain (1844–1893) (compiler); Charles J. Healy (1857–1933) (assistant compiler)			Internet Archive (BPL)	
1883-1884	The Brooklyn City Directory	Lain & Company; George Theodore Lain (1844–1893) (proprietor)	George Theodore Lain (1844–1893) (compiler); Charles J. Healy (1857–1933) (assistant compiler)			Internet Archive (BPL)	
1884–1885	The Brooklyn City Directory	Lain & Company				Internet Archive (BPL)	
1885-1886	The Brooklyn City Directory	Lain & Company; George Theodore Lain (1844–1893) (proprietor)	George Theodore Lain (1844–1893) (compiler); Charles J. Healy (1857–1933) (assistant compiler)			Internet Archive (BPL)	
1886-1887	The Brooklyn City Directory	Lain & Company; George Theodore Lain (1844–1893) (proprietor)	George Theodore Lain (1844–1893) (compiler); Charles J. Healy (1857–1933) (assistant compiler)			Internet Archive (BPL)	
1887-1888	Lain						
1888-1889	The Brooklyn City Directory	Lain & Company; George Theodore Lain (1844–1893); Charles J. Healy (1857–1933) (proprietors)				Internet Archive (BPL)	
1889-1890	Lain						
1890-1891	Lain						
1891-1892	Lain						
1892-1893	Lain						
1893-1894	Lain						
1894-1895	Lain						
1895-1896	Lain						
1896-1897	The Brooklyn City Directory	Lain & Company; K.C. Lain; Charles J. Healy (1857–1933) (proprietors)				Internet Archive (BPL)	
1897-1898	Lain						
1898-1899	The Brooklyn City Directory	Lain & Company; K.C. Lain; Charles J. Healy (1857–1933) (proprietors)				Internet Archive (BPL)	
1899-1900	Lain						
1901	Upington's General Directory of Brooklyn						
1902	Upington's General Directory Borough of Brooklyn (Vol. 79)	George Paul Upington (1850–1910) (publisher)	George Paul Upington (1850–1910) (compiler)			Internet Archive (BPL)	
1903	Upington's General Directory Borough of Brooklyn (Vol. 80)	George Paul Upington (1850–1910) (publisher)	George Paul Upington (1850–1910) (compiler)			Internet Archive (BPL)	
1904	Upington's General Directory Borough of Brooklyn (Vol. 81)	George Paul Upington (1850–1910) (publisher)	George Paul Upington (1850–1910) (compiler)			Internet Archive (BPL)	
1905	Upington's General Directory Borough of Brooklyn (Vol. 82)	George Paul Upington (1850–1910) (publisher)	George Paul Upington (1850–1910) (compiler)			Internet Archive (Allen County Public Library) Part 1 (A-K) Part 2 (K-Z)	
1906	Upington's General Directory Borough of Brooklyn (Vol. 83)	George Paul Upington (1850–1910) (publisher)	George Paul Upington (1850–1910) (compiler)			Internet Archive (BPL)	
1907	Upington's General Directory Borough of Brooklyn (Vol. 84)	George Paul Upington (1850–1910) (publisher)	George Paul Upington (1850–1910) (compiler)			Internet Archive (BPL)	
1908	Upington's General Directory Borough of Brooklyn (Vol. 85)	George Paul Upington (1850–1910) (publisher)	George Paul Upington (1850–1910) (compiler)			Internet Archive (BPL) (includes A-Z, despite cover page)	
1909	Upington's General Directory of the Borough of Brooklyn (Vol. 86)	George Paul Upington (1850–1910) (publisher)	George Paul Upington (1850–1910) (compiler)		HathiTrust	Internet Archive (Allen County Public Library) Part 1 (A-L); Part 2 (L-Z)	
1910	Upington's General Directory of the Borough of Brooklyn	George Upington (estate of) (publisher)				Internet Archive (Allen County Public Library) Part 1 (A-L) Part 2 (L-Z)	
1912	The Brooklyn City Directory (Vol. 88)	Brooklyn Directory Co. (publisher)				Internet Archive (Allen County Public Library) Part 1 (A-H) Part 2 (H-R) Part 3 (R-Z)	

=== Business directories: Brooklyn (Kings County) ===
Year	Title	Printer	Compiler(s)	Google Books	HathiTrust	Internet Archive	Other
1869	The Brooklyn City and Business Directory	Lain & Company (publisher); Wynkoop & Hallenbeck (printer)	George Theodore Lain (1844–1893) (compiler)			Internet Archive	
1870	The Brooklyn City and Business Directory	Lain & Company (publisher); Wynkoop & Hallenbeck (printer)	George Theodore Lain (1844–1893) (compiler)	Google Books	HathiTrust		
1871	The Brooklyn City and Business Directory	Lain & Company (publisher)	George Theodore Lain (1844–1893) (compiler)			Internet Archive	
1872–1873	Curtin's Brooklyn Business Directory	D. Curtin (publisher)				Internet Archive	
1873–1874	Curtin's Brooklyn Business Directory	D. Curtin (publisher)				Internet Archive	
1875	For Goulding's 1875 business directory, see → New York City directories § Business directories						
1875	The Brooklyn City and Business Directory	Lain & Company (publisher)	George Theodore Lain (1844–1893) (compiler)			Internet Archive	
1876	The Brooklyn City and Business Directory	Lain & Company (publisher)	George Theodore Lain (1844–1893) (compiler)			Internet Archive	
1878–1879	Lain's Directory of Long Island – Including a Business Directory of Brooklyn, Long Island City, and the Towns of Kings County, Bath, Bay Ridge, Canarsie, Coney Island, East New York, Flatbush, Flatlands, Fort Hamilton, Gravesend, Guntherville, New Utrecht, Parkville, Sheepshead Bay, and Unionville; Together With a General Directory of Amityville, Babylon, Bay Ridge, Bay Side, Breslau, Bridgehampton, College Point, East Hampton, East Williamsburgh, Farmingdale, Flatbush, Flushing, Fort Hamilton, Freeport, Garden City, Glen Cove, Greenport, Hempstead, Hicksville, Huntington, Islip, Jamaica, Jericho, Locust Valley, Maspeth, Mattituck, Mineola, Newtown, Northport, Oyster Bay, Parkville, Patchogue, Pearsalls, Port Jefferson, Queens, Riverhead, Rockaway, Rockville Centre, Roslyn, Sag Harbor, Sayville, Shelter Island, Southampton, Southold, Springfield, Stoney Brook, Valley Stream, West Hampton, Whitestone, Winfield, Woodhaven, Woodsburgh	Lain & Company (publisher)	George Theodore Lain (1844–1893) (compiler)			Allen County	
1880	The Brooklyn City and Business Directory	Lain & Company (publisher)	George Theodore Lain (1844–1893) (compiler)			Internet Archive	
1883	The Brooklyn Directory – A Business Directory	Lain & Company				Internet Archive	
1890–1991	Lain's Business Directory of Brooklyn, Kings County, Long Island City, Jamaica, Far Rockaway, Flushing, College Point, Hempstead, Newtown and Whitestone	Lain & Company; George Theodore Lain (1844–1893); Charles J. Healy (1857–1933) (proprietors)		Google Books			
1899	Trow's Business Directory of the Borough of Brooklyn, City of New York	Trow Directory, Printing & Bookbinding Co. (printer & Publisher)		Google Books			

=== Copartnership directories: Brooklyn and Queens ===
Year	Title	Printer	Compiler(s)	Google Books	HathiTrust	Internet Archive	Other
1913–1914	Corporation and Copartnership Directory of the Boroughs of Brooklyn and Queens, City of New York	Brooklyn Directory Co. (publisher)	Brooklyn Directory Co. (compiler)			Allen County, Fort Wayne	
1922	Polk's 1922 Copartnership and Corporation Directory – Boroughs of Brooklyn and Queens	R.L. Polk & Co. (publisher)	R.L. Polk & Co. (compiler)			Allen County, Fort Wayne (part 1)	

=== Brooklyn Chamber of Commerce ===
Year	Title	Printer	Compiler(s)	Google Books	HathiTrust	Internet Archive	Other
1921–1922	Brooklyn Register, 1921–1922 – Classified Membership List of the Brooklyn Chamber of Commerce	Brooklyn Chamber of Commerce Bulletin		U. Illinois			

=== Elite directories: Brooklyn ===
Year	Title	Printer	Compiler(s)	Google Books	HathiTrust	Internet Archive	Other
1890–1891	Lain's Elite Directory of Brooklyn, Kings County, Long Island City, Jamaica, Far Rockaway, Flushing, College Point, Hempstead, Newtown and Whitestone	Lain & Co. (publisher); George Theodore Lain (1844–1893); Charles J. Healy (1857–1933) (proprietors)		U. Wisconsin, Madison			
1894	Lain's Elite Directory of Brooklyn	Lain & Healy (publisher); William J. Richardson; Charles J. Healy (1857–1933) (proprietors)				Columbia	

=== Brooklyn street directories ===
Year	Title	Printer	Compiler(s)	Google Books	HathiTrust	Internet Archive	Other
1881	Street Directory of Brooklyn	J.F. Oltrogge & Co. (printer) (John Frederick Oltrogge; 1853–1918)	E.T. Griffith (compiler)			Internet Archive	

=== Citizens and strangers' guides ===
Year	Title	Printer	Compiler(s)	Google Books	HathiTrust	Internet Archive	Other
1837	New-York As It Is, in 1837; Containing, a General Description of the City of New-York, List of Officers, Public Instituteions, and Other Useful Information – Including the Public Officers, &c. of the City of Brooklyn, Accompanied by a Correct Map (Vol. 4)	John Disturnell (1801–1877) (publisher); J.W. Bell (printer)			Columbia	NYPL; Library of Congress; Harvard	
1854	Francis's New Guide to the Cities of New-York and Brooklyn, and the Vicinity	C.S. Francis & Co. (Charles Spencer Francis; 1853–1911) (publisher)		Harvard		LOC	
1856	Francis's New Guide to the Cities of New-York and Brooklyn, and the Vicinity	C.S. Francis & Co. (Charles Spencer Francis; 1853–1911) (publisher)			Columbia	Columbia	
1859	Miller's New York as It Is; Or, Stranger's Guide-Book to the Cities of New York, Brooklyn, and Adjacent Places	James Miller (publisher) (died 1883)		NYPL			NYPL
1863	Miller's New York as It Is; Or, Stranger's Guide-Book to the Cities of New York, Brooklyn, and Adjacent Places	James Miller (publisher) (died 1883)		Chicago			
1865	Miller's New York as It Is; Or, Stranger's Guide-Book to the Cities of New York, Brooklyn, and Adjacent Places	James Miller (publisher) (died 1883)		Harvard			
1866	Miller's New York as It Is; Or, Stranger's Guide-Book to the Cities of New York, Brooklyn, and Adjacent Places	James Miller (publisher) (died 1883)		Harvard; Michigan; Bavarian State Library			
1867	Miller's New York as It Is; Or, Stranger's Guide-Book to the Cities of New York, Brooklyn, and Adjacent Places	James Miller (publisher)		Harvard; UC Berkeley	UC Berkeley		
1870	Miller's New York as It Is; Or, Stranger's Guide-Book to the Cities of New York, Brooklyn, and Adjacent Places	James Miller (publisher)		Harvard			
1871	Miller's New York as It Is; Or, Stranger's Guide-Book to the Cities of New York, Brooklyn, and Adjacent Places	James Miller (publisher)		Harvard			
1872	Miller's New York as It Is; Or, Stranger's Guide-Book to the Cities of New York, Brooklyn, and Adjacent Places	James Miller (publisher)		Harvard	Library of Congress	Library of Congress	
1876	New York as It Was and as It Is: Giving an Account of the City From Its Settlement to the Present Time; Forming a Complete Guide to the Great Metropolis of the Nation, Including the City of Brooklyn and the Surrounding Cities and Villages; Together With a Classified Business Directory; With Map and Illustrations	David Van Nostrand (publisher); John Polhemus (1826–1894) (printer)	John Disturnell (1801–1877)	NYPL		NYPL; Library of Congress; Cornell	
1880	Miller's New York as It Is; Or, Stranger's Guide-Book to the Cities of New York, Brooklyn, and Adjacent Places	James Miller (publisher)		Harvard			
1893	The Citizen Guide to Brooklyn and Long Island	R. Wayne Wilson and Company (publisher) (Guide and Almanac Department of the Brooklyn Citizen); The Jersey City Printy Company (printer)	Richard Wayne Wilson (1844–1919); W.R. Turner; Colin H. Livingstone			Library of Congress; Library of Congress	LOC via Wikipedia Commons

=== Blue books ===
Year	Title	Printer	Compiler(s)	Google Books	HathiTrust	Internet Archive	Other
1902	Brooklyn Blue Book and Long Island ... Society Register – 1903	Brooklyn Life Publishing Company (publisher) (George Herbert Henshaw; 1862–1937)		NYPL			
1904	Brooklyn Blue Book and Long Island ... Society Register – 1905	Brooklyn Life Publishing Company (publisher)		NYPL			
1908	Brooklyn Blue Book and Long Island ... Society Register – 1909	Brooklyn Life Publishing Company (publisher)		NYPL		NYPL	
1910	Brooklyn Blue Book and Long Island ... Society Register – 1911	Brooklyn Life Publishing Company (publisher)		NYPL			
1912	Brooklyn Blue Book and Long Island Society Register – 1912	Brooklyn Life Publishing Company (publisher)		NYPL			
1914	Brooklyn Blue Book and Long Island Society Register – 1914	Brooklyn Life Publishing Company (publisher)		NYPL			
1916	Brooklyn Blue Book and Long Island Society Register – 1916	Brooklyn Life Publishing Company (publisher)		NYPL			
1917	Brooklyn Blue Book and Long Island Society Register – 1917	Brooklyn Life Publishing Company (publisher)		NYPL			
1919	Brooklyn Blue Book and Long Island Society Register – 1919	Brooklyn Life Publishing Company (publisher)		NYPL			
1921	Brooklyn Blue Book and Long Island Society Register – 1921	Rugby Press, Inc. (publisher) (George Herbert Henshaw; 1862–1937)		NYPL			
1922	Brooklyn Blue Book and Long Island Society Register – 1922	Rugby Press, Inc. (publisher)		NYPL			

=== Almanacs ===
Year	Title	Printer	Compiler(s)	Google Books	HathiTrust	Internet Archive	Other
1848	The Brooklyn City Register, Or, Guide for 1848: Containing General Information, Respecting the City of Brooklyn and County of Kings, With a Complete List of City and County Officers, Also, the Most Practical Method of Keeping a Diary or Journal – An Almanac for 1848, the New Constitution of the State, Abstract of City Charter, List of Attornies, Commissioners, Public Schools, Societies, Fire Department, Election Returns, &c., &c.	C.H. Sprague (printer)	Samuel H. Cornwell (1825–1895)	NYPL			
1855	The Brooklyn City and Kings County Record: Budget of General Information; With a Map of the City, an Almanac, and an Appendix Containing the New City Charter	William H. Smith (publisher); John F. Trow (printer)	William H. Smith (compiler)	Harvard			
1890	Brooklyn Daily Eagle Almanac – A Book of Information, General of the World, and Special of New York City and Long Island	The Brooklyn Daily Eagle (publisher)		NYPL			
1891	Brooklyn Daily Eagle Almanac – A Book of Information, General of the World, and Special of New York City and Long Island	The Brooklyn Daily Eagle (publisher)		Michigan			
1893	Citizen's Almanac – A Compendium of Statistics Concerning Brooklyn, Its People, Its Institutions, and Its Neighbors	The Brooklyn Citizen (publisher)		Princeton			
1894	Citizen's Almanac – A Compendium of Statistics Concerning Brooklyn, Its People, Its Institutions, and Its Neighbors	The Brooklyn Citizen (publisher)		Princeton			
1895	Brooklyn Daily Eagle Almanac – A Book of Information, General of the World, and Special of New York City and Long Island (Vol. 10; 1st ed.)	The Brooklyn Daily Eagle (publisher)		Michigan	Michigan		
1897	Brooklyn Daily Eagle Almanac – A Book of Information, General of the World, and Special of New York City and Long Island (Vol. 12; 1st ed.)	The Brooklyn Daily Eagle (publisher)		NYPL			
1898	Brooklyn Daily Eagle Almanac – A Book of Information, General of the World, and Special of New York City and Long Island (Vol. 13; 2nd ed.)	The Brooklyn Daily Eagle (publisher)		NYPL			
1899	Brooklyn Daily Eagle Almanac – A Book of Information, General of the World, and Special of New York City and Long Island (Vol. 14; 2nd ed.)	The Brooklyn Daily Eagle (publisher)		NYPL			
1900	Brooklyn Daily Eagle Almanac – A Book of Information, General of the World, and Special of New York City and Long Island (Vol. 15; 1st ed.)	The Brooklyn Daily Eagle (publisher)		Library of Congress			
1902	Brooklyn Daily Eagle Almanac – A Book of Information, General of the World, and Special of New York City and Long Island (Vol. 17; 1st ed.)	The Brooklyn Daily Eagle (publisher)		Michigan			
1904	Brooklyn Daily Eagle Almanac – A Book of Information, General of the World, and Special of New York City and Long Island (Vol. 19; 1st ed.)	The Brooklyn Daily Eagle (publisher)		Michigan			
1906	Brooklyn Daily Eagle Almanac – A Book of Information, General of the World, and Special of New York City and Long Island (Vol. 21; 1st ed.)	The Brooklyn Daily Eagle (publisher)		University of Minnesota			
1921	Brooklyn Daily Eagle Almanac – A Book of Information, General of the World, and Special of New York City and Long Island (Vol. 36)	The Brooklyn Daily Eagle (publisher)		Harvard			

=== Telephone directories ===
Year	Title	Printer	Compiler(s)	Google Books	HathiTrust	Internet Archive	Other
September 1949	Brooklyn Telephone Directory	New York Telephone Company				Internet Archive	
1958	Brooklyn Telephone Directory	New York Telephone Company				Internet Archive	
1965	Brooklyn Telephone Directory	New York Telephone Company				Internet Archive	

=== Public schools ===
Year	Title	Printer	Compiler(s)	Google Books	HathiTrust	Internet Archive	Other
1892	Souvenir of Our Public Schools, Brooklyn, N.Y.	E.J. Whitlock (publisher); L'Artiste Publishing Co. (publisher)		Columbia	Columbia; Columbia	Columbia	

=== Charities, social services, and church directories ===
Year	Title	Printer	Compiler(s)	Google Books	HathiTrust	Internet Archive	Other
1895	Nickerson's Illustrated Church Musical and School Directory of New York and Brooklyn	Nickerson & Young (Edwin Nickerson) (William S. Young) (publisher); Fless & Ridge Printing Company (printer)		Princeton	Princeton		

=== Maritime directories ===
Year	Title	Printer	Compiler(s)	Google Books	HathiTrust	Internet Archive	Other
1896	Bradley's Reminiscences of New York Harbor – And Complete Waterfront Directory – New York, Brooklyn and Jersey City		David L. Bradley		Library of Congress	Library of Congress	LCCN 01-14765

=== Cemeteries ===
Year	Title	Printer	Compiler(s)	Google Books	HathiTrust	Internet Archive	Other (1807–1885)
1847	Green-Wood Illustrated in Highly Finished Line Engraving, From Drawings Taken on the Spot	Robert Martin (publisher)	James Smillie (1807–1885); Descriptive notices by Nehemiah Cleaveland (1796–1877)	University of Michigan	UC Berkeley	Library of Congress	
1881	The Cemeteries of New York, and How to Reach Them	G.H. Burton (George H. Burton; 1847–1915) (printer)	Selden C. Judson (Selden C. Judson; 1842–1920)		Library of Congress	Library of Congress	
1895	The Leonard Manual of the Cemeteries of New York and Vicinity	J.H. Leonard (John Henry Leonard) (publisher)	J.H. Leonard (John Henry Leonard) (compiler)		Library of Congress	Library of Congress	
1901	The Leonard Manual of the Cemeteries of New York and Vicinity	J.H. Leonard (John Henry Leonard) (publisher)	J.H. Leonard (John Henry Leonard) (compiler)		Library of Congress	Library of Congress	

=== Brooklyn history ===
Year	Title	Printer	Compiler(s)	Google Books	HathiTrust	Internet Archive	Other
1824	Notes, Geographical and Historical, Relating to the Town of Brooklyn, in Kings County, on Long-Island (re-print)	A. Spooner (printer)	Gabriel Furman (1800–1854)	Harvard			
1864	Notes, Geographical and Historical, Relating to the Town of Brooklyn, in Kings County, on Long-Island (re-print)		Gabriel Furman (1800–1854)			Cornell	
1865	Notes, Geographical and Historical, Relating to the Town of Brooklyn, on Long-Island (re-print)		Edwin Bolton Spooner (1808–1876) (printer)	Wisconsin			
1867	A History of the City of Brooklyn, Including the Old Town and Village of Brooklyn, the Town of Bushwick, and the Village and City of Williamsburgh (Vol. 1)	© David Williams Patterson (1824–1892); Joel Munsell (1808–1880) printer	Henry Reed Stiles (1832–1909)	Michigan	Harvard	Allen County	
1869	A History of the City of Brooklyn, Including the Old Town and Village of Brooklyn, the Town of Bushwick, and the Village and City of Williamsburgh (Vol. 2)	© David Williams Patterson (1824–1892)	Henry Reed Stiles (1832–1909)	Michigan	Cornell	Allen County	
1870	A History of the City of Brooklyn, Including the Old Town and Village of Brooklyn, the Town of Bushwick, and the Village and City of Williamsburgh (Vol. 3)	© David Williams Patterson (1824–1892); Joel Munsell (1808–1880) (printer)	Henry Reed Stiles (1832–1909)	Michigan	Harvard		
1908	Flatbush of To-Day: The Realm of Light and Air – Published on the Occasion of the Tri-Centennial Celebration of the Coming of the Dutch to Flatbush and the Dutch Festival Held the Week of April 27 to May 2	All Souls Universalist Church (publisher)	Herbert Foster Gunnison (1858–1932) (editor)	Harvard	Harvard	Harvard	

=== Brooklyn maps ===
Year	Title	Printer	Compiler(s)	Google Books	HathiTrust	Internet Archive	Other
1873	New Utrecht, Kings Co. – Bath, Town of New Utrecht, Kings Co.	Beers, Comstock & Cline (William T. Comstock) (John A. Cline) (publisher); Charles Hart (1824–1914) (printer); Louis E. Neuman (1835–1902) (engraver)	Under the Superintendence of Frederick William Beers (1839–1933)				NYPL (c:Category:Beers maps of Long Island published in 1873)

=== State directories ===
Year	Title	Printer	Compiler(s)	Google Books	HathiTrust	Internet Archive	Other
1912	First Annual Industrial Directory of New York State, 1912	John Williams (1865–1944) (Commissioner of Labor); New York State Department of Labor (publisher)	John Williams (compiler)	UC Berkeley; Michigan			

== Selected Brooklyn directories not found online ==
Hope & Henderson's

1. Hope & Henderson's (consolidated) Brooklyn City Directory for 1856–7, With a General Business Directory Combined; Also a Complete Street and Avenue Guide, and an Appendix, Etc., Etc (this publication ran from 1856–1857 thru 1867–1868). LCCN 01-15253; OCLC 733562060 (all editions).

== Map gallery ==
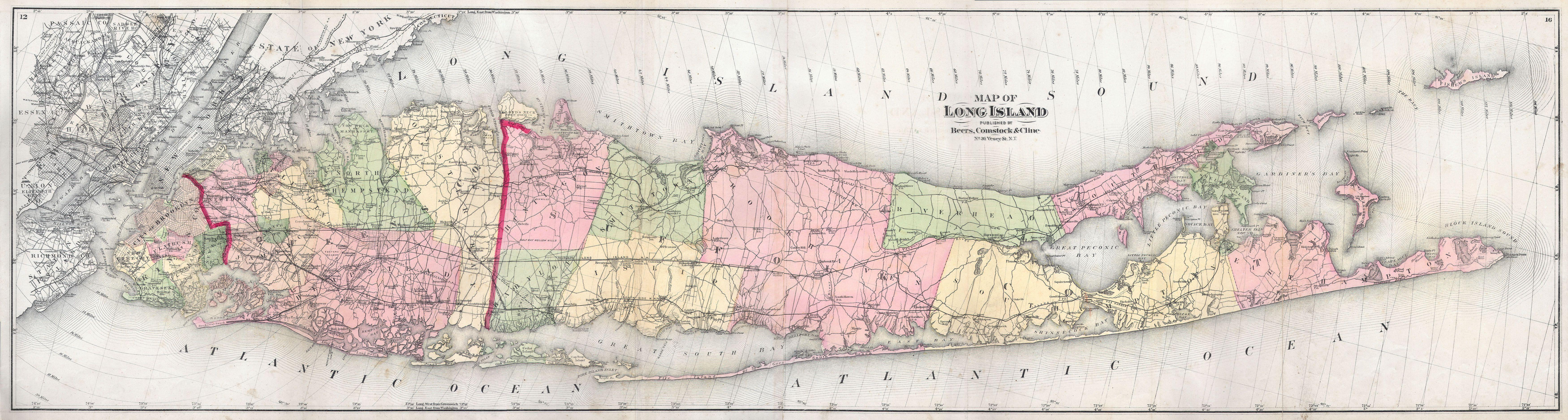
(1873)
1873 maps of bygone Brooklyn community names

New Utrecht and Bath

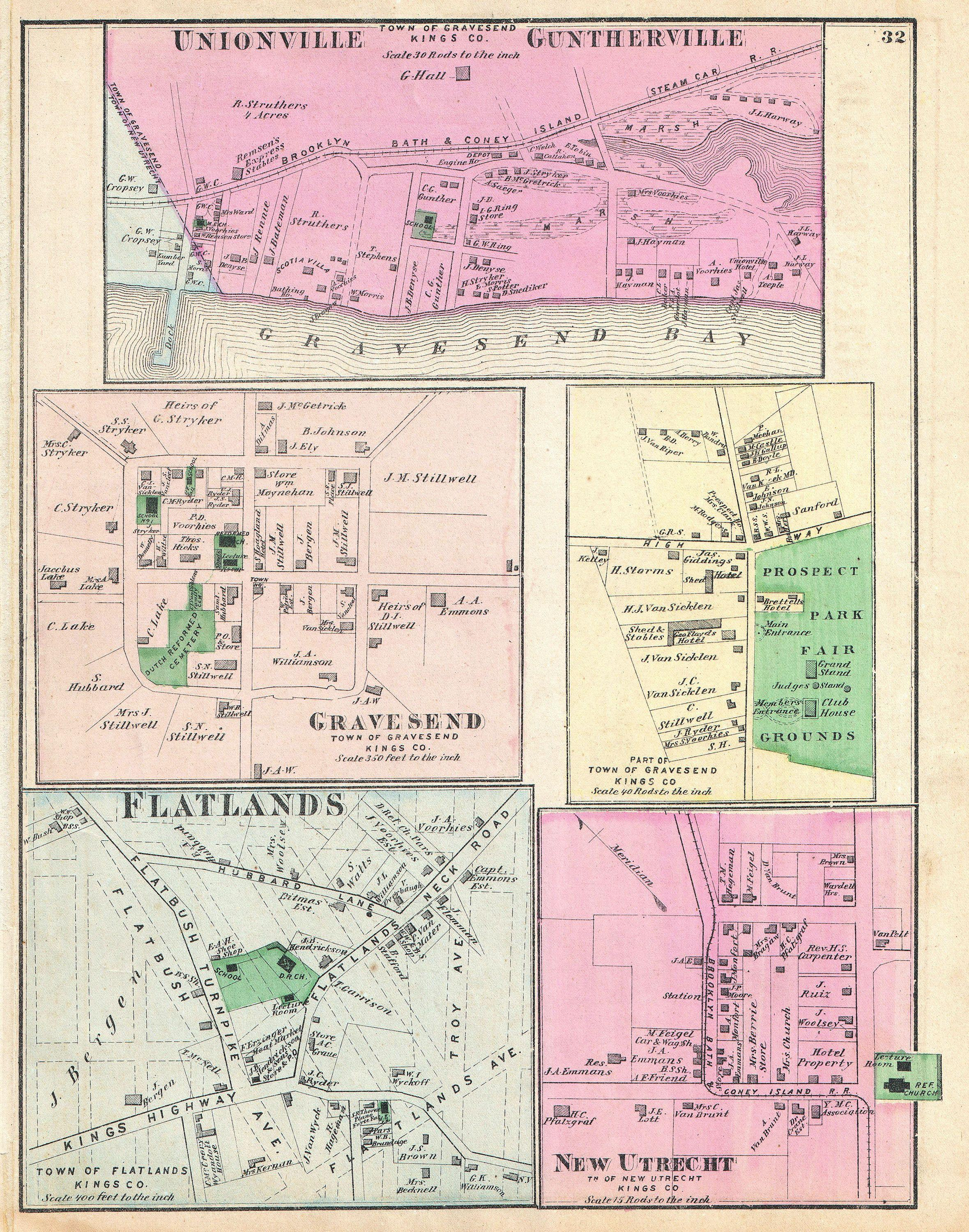
Gravesend, Flatlands, New Utrecht, and Unionville

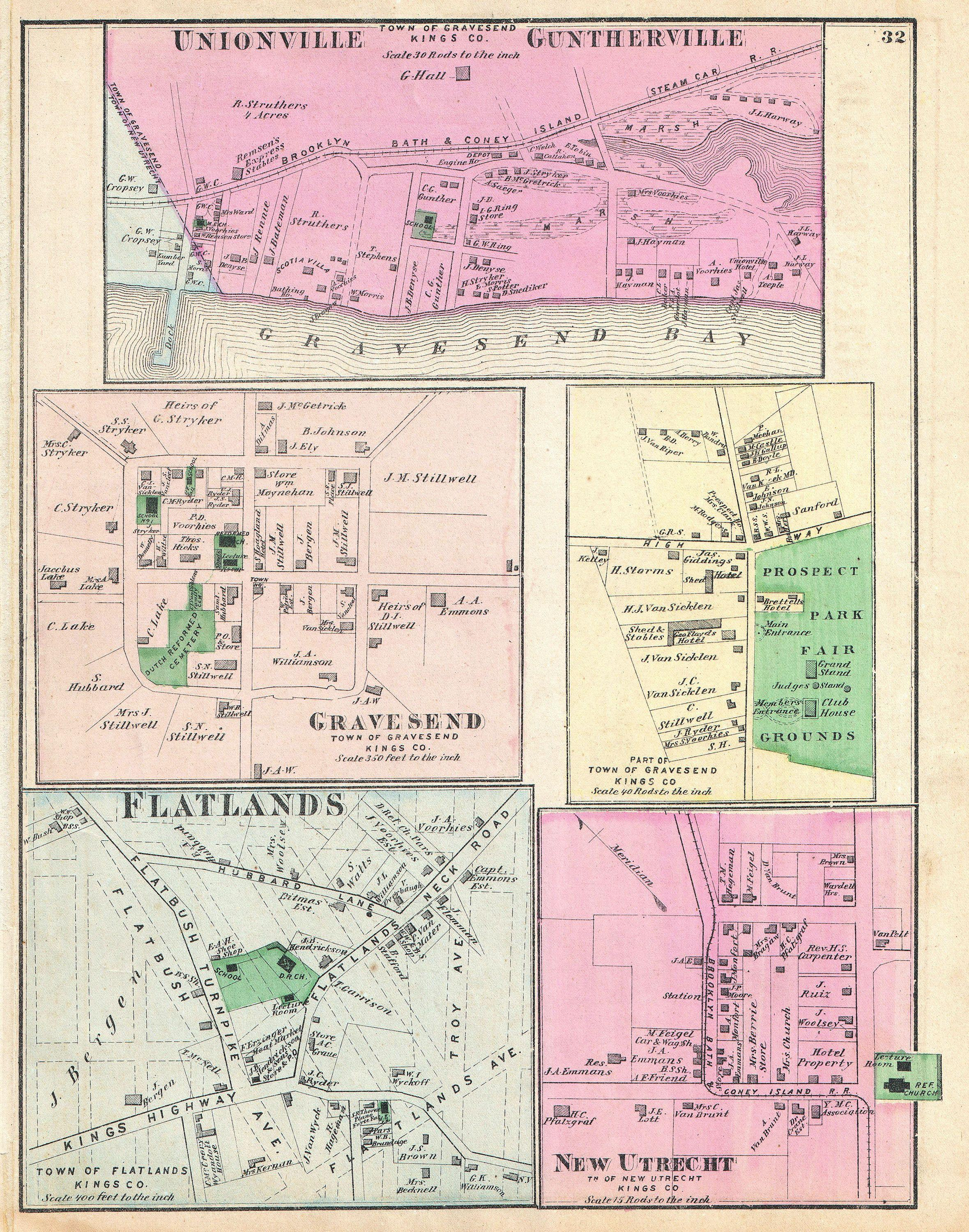
Gravesend, Flatlands, New Utrecht, Unionville, and Guntherville

== Citations ==
=== References ===
- Armbruster, Eugene L. (1865–1943) (May 7, 1912). The Eastern District of Brooklyn – With Illustrations and Maps. New York. Retrieved August 24, 2021 – via Google Books (NYPL). LCCN 12-12937; OCLC 2742749 (all editions).
1. "East New York". p. 58.
- Beers, Frederick William (1839–1933), cartographer (supervisor) (1873). Atlas of Long Island, New York – From Recent and Actual Surveys and Records (192 pages, including 98 color maps, folded). New York: Beers, Comstock & Cline (publisher). Charles Hart (1824–1914) (printer). Louis E. Neuman (1835–1902) (engraver) – via New York Public Library, Digital Collections. LCCN 2016-430357; OCLC 994815013 (all editions), 953568433 & 13964902 (microfilm).
1. "Map of Long Island". OCLC 767854563
  .
2. "New Utrecht. Kings Co." – "Bath, Town of New Utrecht, Kings Co.". OCLC 767841145
  .
- Brooklyn Daily Eagle, The (October 14, 1851). "Death of Mr. Lees". Vol. 10, no. 244. p. 2 (column 2) – via Newspapers.com.
- Brooklyn Daily Eagle, The (April 8, 1934). "Brooklyn Directory of 1933–34". Vol. 93, no. 97. pp. H26 – H28 – via Newspapers.com.
- "Brooklyn Directories, 1796–1905". List of Books on Greater New York. Brooklyn Public Library. 1906. pp. 4–5 – via Google Books (Michigan. LCCN 06-23732; OCLC 2773755 (all editions).
- Brooklyn Daily Eagle, The (May 30, 1910). "Obituary: George P. Upington". Vol. 71, no. 149. p. 12 (column 5) – via Newspapers.com.
- "Brooklyn Register, 1921–1922 – Classified Membership List of the Brooklyn Chamber of Commerce". Bulletin. 3 (5). Brooklyn Chamber of Commerce. October 15, 1921 – via Google Books. OCLC 33907698.
- Dion, Brett; DeBoer, Lisa (archivists) (2008). "Guide to Brooklyn City Directories and Telephone Directories on Microfilm, 1796–1986" (PDF). Brooklyn Public Library.
- Gunnison, Herbert Foster (1858–1932) (1908). Flatbush of To-Day: The Realm of Light and Air – Published on the Occasion of the Tri-Centennial Celebration of the Coming of the Dutch to Flatbush and the Dutch Festival Held the Week of April 27 to May 2. Vol. 2. Brooklyn: All Souls Universalist Church (publisher). ©Benjamin T. Butterworth (1870–1953). Retrieved September 7, 2021. LCCN 08-14523; OCLC 11367764 (all editions), 475844818.
1. Via Google Books (Harvard).
2. Via HathiTrust (Harvard). Realm of light and air. 1908.
- Huling, Alden Spooner (1845–1912) (1909). Brief Sketch of the Ancestry of Alden Spooner, Late of Brooklyn, L.I. – With a Record of his Descendants to August, 1909. Topeka, Kansas: Hall Lithograph Company – via Internet Archive (Boston Public Library) → The author was a grandson of Alden Spooner. LCCN 11-1060; OCLC 987954972 (all editions).
- Inland Printer, The; Nurse, William Reynolds (1844–1909) (June 1890). "Eminent American Printers – Mr. John Polhemus". 7 (9). Chicago: The Inland Printer Company: 816–817 – via Google Books.
- New England Stationer and Printer (May 1902). "A Semi-Centennial – John Polhemus Printing Company, Printers and Stationers". 16 (3). Springfield, Massachusetts: W.W. Walden & Co.: 3 – via Google Books. (masthead is on p. 26)
- New York Times, The (May 4, 1864). "Copartnership Notices: Dissolution → Copartnership: 'Wynkoop, Hallenbick & Thomas' — "Copartnership ... Formed: 'Wynkoop & Hallenbeck'". Vol. 13, no. 3935. p. 6 (column 5) – via Newspapers.com.
- New York Times, The (March 31, 1895). "The Obituary Record: Matthew Bennett Wynkoop". Vol. 44, no. 13605. p. 3 (column 5) – via Newspapers.com.
- NYPL Bulletin (March 1902). "Check List of Brooklyn Directories in the New York Public Library". Bulletin of the New York Public Library. Lists of works relating to Brooklyn. Vol. 6. New York Public Library. pp. 89–92 – via Google Books. OCLC 64556237 (article).
- Spooner Papers; Pavlik, Nicholas (collection processed by) (March 30, 2017). Guide to the Alden Spooner Family Papers. Brooklyn Public Library → Center for Brooklyn History. OCLC 913721336.
- Williams, Americus V. (1845–1921) (1913). The Development and Growth of City Directories. Cincinnati: The William Directory Co. p. 75 – via Google Books (NYPL).; OCLC 1042341701 (all editions).
