= Wynkoop =

Wynkoop or Wyncoop can refer to:

- Benjamin Wynkoop, silversmith
- Henry Wynkoop, politician from Pennsylvania
- Cornelius Wynkoop stone house
- Joel Wynkoop, American actor
- Wynkoop Brewing Company
- Mildred Bangs Wynkoop, evangelical minister and theologian
- Edward W. Wynkoop, Union Army officer, Indian agent, a founder of Denver
- Gerardus Wynkoop II, Speaker of the Pennsylvania House of Representatives in 1793
- Wynkoop Spring, West Virginia
- Wyncoop Run, a stream in Pennsylvania
