= Carolyn E. Demarest =

Former American judge

Justice, New York Supreme Court, Kings County, New York, Brooklyn
- In office 1990–2016
- Appointed by: Governor Mario Cuomo (1990), and then elected to two fourteen-year terms (1991 and 2005)

Judge, Family Court of the City of New York (appointed by Mayor Edward I. Koch in 1985)

Interim Judge of New York City Civil Court (appointed by Mayor Edward I. Koch in 1983 and 1985)

Personal details
- Education: New York University (B.A. 1967); New York University School of Law (J.D., magna cum laude, 1972)

Carolyn E. Demarest is a retired American judge who served in New York's state and local court systems for 33 years. This includes her role as justice of the trial level New York Supreme Court for Brooklyn, Kings County, where she served for 26 years, and was one of that court's original Commercial Division specialist business court judges.

== Judicial service ==
Demarest served for 26 years on the Supreme Court of Brooklyn, Kings County, from 1990 to 2016. She was originally appointed to the Supreme Court by Governor Mario Cuomo in 1990, and subsequently won election to a 14-year term beginning in 1991, and then re-election in 2005 for another term. Before serving as a Supreme Court justice, New York Mayor Edward I. Koch appointed Demarest as a judge on the Family Court of the City of New York, where she served from 1985 to 1989. In 1983 and in 1985, Koch had appointed Demarest as an interim judge to the Civil Court of the City of New York.

Demarest has presided over civil and criminal cases, and during her Supreme Court service, among other things, she was "designated to handle capital and complex cases in the Criminal Term." She was an editor and an author of the Kings County Criminal Term Manual. In 2005, she was judge in a prominent case involving the bribery of witnesses in a murder trial.

Demarest was "one of two Justices designated to develop and preside over the Commercial Division in Kings County, which opened in December 2002." She was a presiding judge in the Commercial Division from 2002 to 2016. New York's Commercial Division is a specialized business court docket within New York's Supreme Court, with a jurisdiction limited to disputes of a business and commercial nature. Commercial Division judges preside over an assigned case from beginning to end. "The caseload of the Division is ... very demanding, requiring of the court scholarship in commercial law, experience in the management of complex cases, and a wealth of energy."

Demarest issued over 500 legal opinions as a Commercial Division judge. Among many other areas of the law, she has written important opinions on issues relating to business divorce, where parties in a formal business relationship are ending their legal ties. In 2013, she oversaw high-profile litigation involving the State University of New York's effort to close the Long Island College Hospital.

== Legal practice ==
Demarest was an associate attorney at Skadden, Arps, Slate, Meagher, & Flom from 1972 to 1973. She served in the New York City Appeals Division of the city's Law Department, as Assistant Chief Corporation Counsel from 1976 to 1983. She practiced appellate law as a solo practitioner from 1984 to 1985. She also served as Special Assistant Corporation Counsel for the City of New York in 1984.

After retiring as a judge, in 2017 Demarest joined JAMS where she provides private alternative dispute resolution services as a mediator, arbitrator, and special master.

== Judicial clerkship ==
From 1973 to 1976, Demarest was a judicial law clerk to Judge Stanley Danzig of the Civil Court of the City of New York.

== Education ==
Demarest received her Bachelor of Arts degree from New York University in 1967, and her Juris Doctor degree, magna cum laude, from New York University School of Law in 1972. She has been an instructor at Bernard M. Baruch College of the City University of New York.

== Awards and honors ==
In 2005, Demarest received four distinct awards and honors: (1) the Ruth E. Moskowitz Award from the Kings County Supreme Court; (2) the Metropolitan Black Bar Association's Jurist of the Year award; (3) the New York State Bar Association's Section of Federal and Commercial Litigation Award; and a Distinguished Service award from Brooklyn's Borough President Marty Markowitz. In 2009, Demarest received three distinct honors: (1) a second Distinguished Service award from Brooklyn's Borough President Marty Markowitz; (2) the Outstanding Citizens Award from City Council; and (3) the Honorable William Bellard Award from the Diocese of Brooklyn's Catholic Lawyers Guild. While in law school, she served on the New York University Law Review editorial board, and was a magna cum laude graduate.

== Positions and memberships ==
Demarest has held the following positions, among others;

- Chair, New York City Bar Association's Council on Judicial Administration (2016–)
- Founding member of the American College of Business Court Judges
- Member, New York State Bar Association Task Force on Continuing Legal Education
- Chair, New York State Bar's Municipal Affairs Committee, Subcommittee on Quality of Life: Crime and Education
- Chair, New York State Bar's Committee on Education and Law Committee, Subcommittee: Integration and High Schools
