= Eugene Armbruster =

American artist

Eugene L. Armbruster (1865–1943) was a New York City photographer, illustrator, writer, and historian born in Baden-Baden, Germany and based in Bushwick, Brooklyn, where he died. His work includes many buildings, roads, and neighborhoods in area towns such as

- Amagansett
- Astoria
- Bridgehampton
- Brooklyn
- Brooklyn Heights
- Bushwick
- Coney Island
- Corona
- East New York
- East Hampton
- Elmhurst
- Flatbush
- Flatlands
- Flushing
- Forest Hills
- Gravesend
- Hempstead
- Jackson Heights
- Jamaica
- Jericho
- Long Island City
- Manhattan
- Maspeth
- Middle Village
- Montauk
- Oyster Bay
- Queens Village
- Rego Park
- Ridgewood
- Rikers Island
- South Ozone Park
- Southampton
- Sullivan County
- Williamsburg

== Life ==
Armbruster was born in Baden-Baden, Germany in 1865 and immigrated to the United States in 1882. He was naturalized as a United States citizen in 1891. He owned a house on Eldert Street in Bushwick, where he lived with his wife Julia, and their two children Julia and Eugene Jr. He was a proprietor of the H. Henkel Cigar Box Manufacturing Company until his retirement in 1920. While Armbruster did photography and historical writing throughout his life, he conducted much of this work after he retired. Armbruster took thousands of photographs of Long Island throughout his life. His purpose for taking these photographs was documentary and he was not necessarily concerned with the aesthetic quality. Armbruster often worked as his own publisher and published many limited edition pamphlets. In the 1930s Armbruster served on a Work Progress Administration project collecting information for a local history project.

== Photography and historical work ==
Armbruster took photographs for documentary over aesthetic purposes. He usually chose to photograph in late fall, winter, and early spring. The overwhelming majority of his photographs are of buildings and street scenes. Many of the landmarks were soon demolished as real estate developers acquired more and more land. His works document Long Island before its transition from farms and fields to urban and suburban developments. Armbruster published several books, most of which pertain to the history of Brooklyn from Dutch settlement in the 17th century to the early 20th century. He was also the author of pamphlets, and a columnist for the Brooklyn Daily Eagle. In the newspaper he often answered questions from readers about the history of Brooklyn, advertised his books, and advocated for the preservation of historic buildings. Armbruster's published pamphlets were mostly limited edition with about 300-500 prints made. Armbruster gathered his research by exploring sites, talking to locals, as well as, by reading newspapers and history books. For his research and work on Genealogy he also referenced census records.

His published books include:

- The Eastern District of Brooklyn, with Illustrations and Maps (1912)
- Long Island: Its Early Days and Development (1914)
- The Wallabout Prison Ship, 1776–1783 (1920)
- The Original Language of Mankind (1933)

== Library and archival holdings ==
Substantial holdings of Armbruster's photographic prints and negatives, and scrapbooks can be found at the following cultural institutions: Queens Library, New-York Historical Society, Brooklyn Historical Society, and New York Public Library.

His photographs were identified and described by Vincent Seyfried for Queens Library. According to the library's finding aid, Armbruster photographed areas in Kings County, New York, from approximately 1895 to 1936; Manhattan from 1920 to 1925; Nassau County, New York, from 1917 to 1925; Queens County, New York, from 1910 to 1931; Rikers Island in 1931; and Suffolk County, New York, from 1910 to 1934. The Queens Library collection divides their 6.950 photographs into eight series by county, plus "miscellaneous 1920–1925" and "unknown 1910–1925".
