= Center for Brooklyn History =

Institution in Brooklyn, New York

- Brooklyn Historical Society Building (Long Island Historical Society Building)
- U.S. National Register of Historic Places
- U.S. National Historic Landmark
- U.S. National Historic Landmark District – Contributing property
- New York State Register of Historic Places
- New York City Landmark
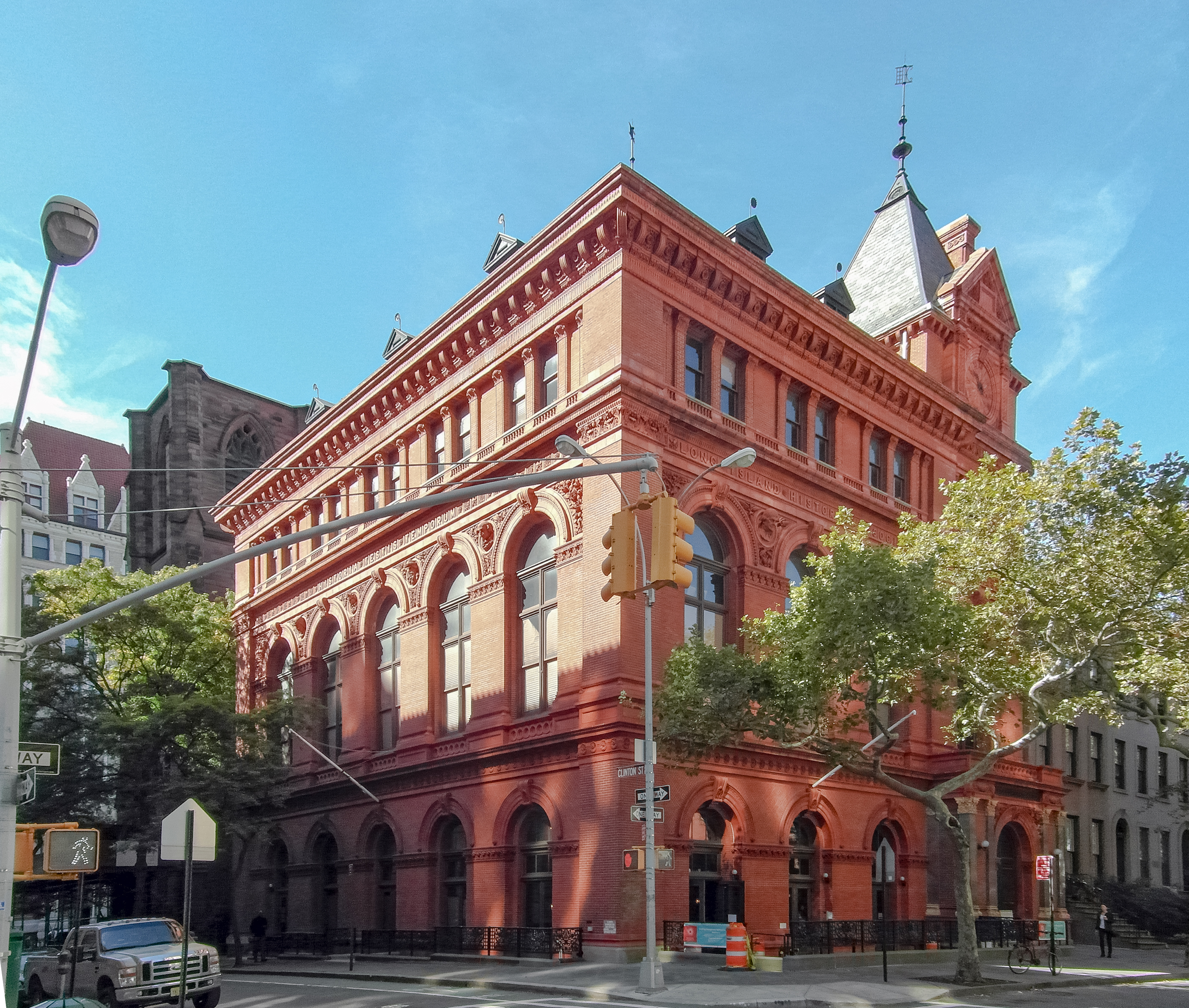
- Exterior of the building

- Location within New York City Location within New York Location within the United States
- Interactive map of Brooklyn Historical Society Building (Long Island Historical Society Building)
- Location: 128 Pierrepont Street; Brooklyn Heights, New York City, New York, US
- Coordinates: 40°41′41.5″N 73°59′34″W
- Built: 1878–1881
- Built by: David H. King, Jr.
- Architect: George B. Post
- Architectural style: Renaissance revival
- Part of: Brooklyn Heights Historic District (ID66000524)
- NRHP reference No.: 91002054
- NYSRHP No.: 04701.000502
- NYCL No.: 1131

Significant dates
- Added to NRHP: July 17, 1991
- Designated NHL: July 17, 1991
- Designated NYSRHP: June 23, 1980
- Designated NYCL: March 23, 1982 (interior only)

The Center for Brooklyn History (CBH; formerly the Long Island Historical Society and Brooklyn Historical Society) is a museum, library branch, and educational center in Brooklyn, New York, United States. Part of the Brooklyn Public Library (BPL) system, it is located at 128 Pierrepont Street in Brooklyn Heights. The CBH hosts materials, events, and programs relating to the history of Brooklyn, with over 300,000 items in its collection as of 2023.

The Long Island Historical Society, or LIHS, was founded in 1863 as a membership library named after its geographic location on Long Island. It initially occupied rented space but, due to rapid growth in its collections, built the Pierrepont Street structure between 1878 and 1881. After the independent city of Brooklyn became part of New York City in 1898, the LIHS began focusing more heavily on Brooklyn. As the organization's focus changed, it was rebranded as the Brooklyn Historical Society (BHS) in 1984. Following a 2020 merger with the BPL, the building reopened as the CBH in 2023 and became accessible to the public free of charge.

The center's four-story building, designed by George B. Post and built by David H. King Jr., was designed in the Renaissance Revival style, occupying a rectangular site at Pierrepont and Clinton streets. The facade is made of brick with terracotta trim and is divided into three tiers, corresponding to the interior uses. The first floor contains a lobby and originally had an auditorium (later an exhibit gallery). The second and third floors contain the Othmer Library, while the fourth floor, originally a museum, is used as offices and storage. The building, part of the Brooklyn Heights Historic District, is a National Historic Landmark and a New York City interior landmark.

The CBH's collection includes books, newspapers, maps, photographs, and manuscripts. Many of these items are related to Long Island and New York City history, though the society also collected volumes about other topics. The collection also includes other miscellaneous objects such as art, furniture, dishware. The center hosts exhibitions and programs as well. The society previously published the Journal of Long Island History until 1985, and it briefly had a branch in Dumbo between 2017 and 2020.

== History ==
=== 19th century ===
==== Founding and early years ====
The Center for Brooklyn History was originally the Long Island Historical Society (LIHS), founded in 1863, at a time when Brooklyn was an independent city in western Long Island. On February 4 of that year, several prominent residents of Long Island (then composed of Kings, Queens, and Suffolk counties) signed a circular supporting the establishment of a membership library for books, photographs, awards, memorials, and documents. A resolution to establish a historical society was passed in early March, and the organization was officially incorporated under New York state law that April. Carson Brevoort was the founding president, and Henry Reed Stiles was its first librarian. Initially, the LIHS rented space. Following its first meeting at the Brooklyn Academy of Music on May 7, it occupied the second floor of the Hamilton Building at Court and Joralemon streets in Brooklyn Heights. Before the end of 1863, the society had 400 members, and at its first anniversary, the society had 10,000 unique volumes. The society hosted about fifteen meetings a year, where reports and papers were read to large audiences.

The LIHS established its first permanent fund in 1865, when Caroline and Ellen Thurston provided $2,000 (Note: Equivalent to $33,000 in 2025) for a special collection. The society had expanded to eight rooms in the Hamilton Building by 1867, amid the rapid growth of the collection, which had reached 14,000 books and 16,000 pamphlets. The society also began searching for land for a future building, and it began raising $50,000 for a permanent library fund. That year, the LIHS bought three land lots at the southwest corner of Pierrepont and Clinton streets for $32,500. (Note: Equivalent to $615,000 in 2025) The site was, at the time, an upscale cultural center, located near many clubhouses and governmental buildings. The society had raised $20,000 for the land within one year, (Note: Equivalent to $402,000 in 2025) while the rest of the cost was funded through a mortgage loan.

The LIHS established a Building Committee, which selected Leopold Eidlitz to design the building in 1870. By then, the LIHS had 1,200 members and split its meetings between its own offices and the Packer Institute. The LIHS began raising money for a new building in 1871, but the Panic of 1873 slowed down fundraising, and the society fell into debt. Brevoort resigned as president in 1873 and was succeeded by Richard Salter Storrs. Further damaging the LIHS's finances, the Hamilton Building caught fire in January 1874, causing thousands of dollars worth of damage. The fire prompted the society to temporarily pause its proposed expansion program, though the Brooklyn Eagle wrote that the fire had given LIHS directors even more of a reason to erect a new building. The LIHS had revived its efforts to erect the new building by 1876, anticipating that it would need $200,000 for the building fund. (Note: Equivalent to $5.4 million in 2025) At the time, the society was looking to increase membership. The society's collection was valued at $80,000 by the next year, (Note: Equivalent to $2.2 million in 2025) but the library at Court and Joralemon streets was still vulnerable to fire.

==== Construction of headquarters ====
The LIHS sought to construct a structure with a library, museum, reading rooms, and photograph gallery. Disputes over whether the building should include a lecture hall prompted Abiel Abbot Low, one of the LIHS's trustees, to resign. By November 1877, the LIHS had raised $100,000, (Note: Equivalent to $2.8 million in 2025) the minimum amount required for the building fund to become legally binding. One-fifth of the amount had come from board member S. R. Chittenden, who had previously helped secure the land. Following that month's board meeting, the LIHS voted to select a seven-person building committee; the society had already received several designs by then, despite not having solicited bids yet. The LIHS formally launched an architectural design competition in December 1877, receiving either 14, 15, or 16 proposals. Among the unsuccessful proposals were Henry Hudson Holly's Queen Anne design; J. Pickering Putnam's Gothic design, which closely resembled the nearby Brooklyn Art Association; and Parfitt Brothers' design, with a Gothic exterior and a clear interior hierarchy.

The building fund had grown further to $125,000 by March 1878. (Note: Equivalent to $3.7 million in 2025) That month, the building fund recommended selecting George Browne Post as the architect, a commission he ultimately accepted. Post's commission was, in part, due to his experience constructing commercial structures such as the first Equitable Life Building and the New York World Building. Excavation on the site began in October 1878, with the LIHS adhering to its original $100,000 budget. The next month, the LIHS received a construction permit from the Brooklyn Department of Fire and Buildings, at which point the foundation was nearly completed. David H. King Jr. was hired as the contractor. Stone was originally proposed to be used as exterior decoration, but ultimately, terracotta was used instead, Terracotta was used in place of the originally-planned stone, By March 1879, the exterior walls and interior iron columns were being constructed, and the partition walls had reached the third story; the exterior was finished by December.

The interior had progressed significantly enough that, by mid-1880, the collections could be moved into the new building. The LIHS temporarily closed its library that October to relocate its collection. The building's construction cost totaled either $121,209 (Note: Equivalent to $3.5 million in 2025) or $135,700, (Note: Equivalent to $3.9 million in 2025) funded entirely by 300 donors. News media wrote that, if the contracts had been delayed even slightly, the LIHS would have incurred tens of dollars worth of additional expenses. Due to the relatively low budget, the LIHS did not have sufficient funds to make the building fully fireproof, as much of the funding went toward paying off mortgages and completing the decorations. The new building was supposed to have opened in December 1880, but this was postponed due to delays in interior furnishings, for which approximately $40,000 more needed to be raised. (Note: Equivalent to $1,144,000 in 2025) At the time, the LIHS had grown to 1,400 members, and it had 26,000 volumes and pamphlets apiece.

==== 1880s and 1890s ====
The LIHS moved to its new building in 1881.

On January 12, 1881, the LIHS formally took ownership of the new Pierrepont Street building, having paid off all outstanding debts. The LIHS held its first board meeting in the new building that May. Soon afterward, the LIHS's membership peaked at 1,600. The new LIHS building hosted events such as twice-monthly meetings of its members, meetings of the Brooklyn Diet Dispensary, and concert performances. The library on the second and third floors was restricted to members only. Though the first-floor lecture hall was a popular venue for speeches and concerts, the LIHS had intended the lecture hall to be easily convertible into additional library space if needed. The fourth floor had a museum devoted to natural history, antiquities, and miscellaneous items. The society's endowment fund had reached $100,000 by 1888; (Note: Equivalent to $3.1 million in 2025) the fund included various donations intended for specific collections.

LIHS members began raising funds in 1889 for the establishment of a library catalog, given the continued growth of the collection, which three years later had reached 50,000 volumes. The society published its first printed catalog in 1893. The catalog soon became outdated, and a card catalog had to be implemented to track later acquisitions. The LIHS's endowment fund of $121,000 (Note: Equivalent to $4.0 million in 2025) was by then among the twenty largest library endowment funds in the US, though it had a relatively small staff of seven. After Brooklyn joined New York City in 1898 and became a borough, the LIHS increasingly narrowed its focus to Brooklyn history. Lectures, which had long been one of the LIHS's main events, gradually declined in frequency. At the time, Brooklyn residents made up nearly half the society's board of councilors, and the collection had grown to 150,000 items. Membership, conversely, had declined to fewer than a thousand.

=== 20th century ===
==== 1900s to 1930s ====
The LIHS's directors voted in 1900 to allow public access to the library and to convert the first floor into a reading room; the directors filed to change the terms of its incorporation that October. Storrs, the LIHS's longtime president, died that year and was succeeded by Alexander E. Orr. The LIHS discussed possibly merging with the Brooklyn Public Library (BPL) in 1901, but this plan did not succeed, since the directors wished to continue operating as a non-circulating library. Although the museum was open to the public, the library remained for member use only. Upon Orr's resignation in 1907, Willard Bartlett became the LIHS's president. Meanwhile, the society continued to lose members through attrition until, by 1911, the society had only four staff.

In 1917, the LIHS stopped using its auditorium, which was given to the American Red Cross's supply committee that May. Since it was beginning to run out of storage space, the LIHS also began transferring parts of its collection to other historical societies; for example, in 1918, it transferred colonial artifacts to the Roslyn Historical Museum in Roslyn, New York. The Red Cross occupied the LIHS building for seven years, at which point the society was compelled to expand into the Red Cross's space. Bartlett led the LIHS until his death in 1925, after which William B. Davenport took over. The former Red Cross offices became storage space for the LIHS's newspaper collection that year. The society rejected an offer in 1926 to operate a colonial house in Bergen Beach as a historic house museum, and the organization closed the museum on its headquarters' top floor that year. Concurrently, the ground floor was renovated as commercial offices.

Following Davenport's death in 1929, William G. Low became the LIHS's president the following year. By the early 1930s, the LIHS's genealogical collection was by far the most popular part of the LIHS library; it comprised one-tenth of the total collection but attracted ten times as many readers as the other volumes combined. By that decade, the library had about 100,000 books, and an elevator had been added. Further additions in the 1930s included the addition of a fire escape and sprinklers. Low led the LIHS until his death in 1936; his successor, B, Herbert Smith, served only three years before himself dying in 1939. That year, a tablet dedicated to Deborah Moody, a colonial American landowner who founded Gravesend, Brooklyn, was dedicated at the building.

==== 1940s to 1970s ====
Detail of the Center for Brooklyn History building's entrance tower

The LIHS acquired the collection of the Kings County Historical Society following a merger in 1941, and the 53 members of the Kings County Historical Society joined the LIHS. Brooklyn Red Cross conducted a home nursing instruction center at the LIHS building starting in 1943, and by mid-decade, the LIHS had about 500 members. During that decade, Guy Du Val led the LIHS, serving until his death in 1949; he was followed by Lewis W. Francis in 1950, then by Joseph Dana Allen in 1952.

By the early 1950s, although the LIHS's library was open to the public free of charge, the Brooklyn Eagle wrote that Brooklyn residents were not familiar with the society. The LIHS's membership began to grow again later that decade, when the society resumed membership drives; by 1956, the society had 600 members, a four-decade high. Upon the LIHS's centennial in 1963, it had 800 members and a collection of 100,000 volumes. By then, it was Long Island's oldest historical society, out of 23 that existed at the time. In 1973, the LIHS temporarily lost its tax exemption from the city government before regaining it.

The LIHS employed 11 staff members in the mid-1970s, who proposed forming a labor union. At the time, membership had grown slightly to 825, while its collection had expanded to 125,000 volumes; the LIHS estimated that it had about 30 daily visitors. The collection had evolved to include rare books, biographies, genealogies, and maps, and the society was receiving so many genealogy requests that it began referring patrons to other organizations for genealogical information. The term "Long Island" had colloquially come to apply only to Nassau and Suffolk counties on eastern Long Island, and Brooklyn residents were largely unaware of the LIHS, leading to proposals to rename the society. In 1976, minibuses began serving the LIHS and several other cultural institutions near Downtown Brooklyn, as part of an initiative to increase visitation. The society also conducted an inventory of its collection, finding that some of its objects had been stolen or misplaced.

==== 1980s and 1990s: Renaming and further changes ====
By the early 1980s, the society was planning to restore some of its paintings. During that time, the LIHS enlarged its board of directors, which comprised 30 people by 1984. In preparation for a narrowing of its scope, the organization stopped accepting materials related to Long Island's other counties in January 1984, and the directors voted the next month to rename the organization the Brooklyn Historical Society (BHS). The name change took effect that March. By then, the BHS had 1,200 members, a plurality of whom lived in Brooklyn, and the building was open to nonmembers for a daily fee. Only about 10% of the collection focused on eastern Long Island, and all except three of the BHS's directors (comprising 10% of the board) hailed from Brooklyn. The BHS then had its members vote on the matter, where the renaming passed by a narrow margin of 392–350.

Supporters of the renaming cited the collection's predominant focus on Brooklyn and said the old name misled people into thinking that the society was elsewhere. Dissenting members wanted to retain the society's island-wide focus. Residents of Nassau and Suffolk counties argued that the BHS should give up its eastern Long Island collections, and they petitioned the New York Attorney General's office to reverse the renaming. The BHS's renaming was ultimately finalized by New York State Education Department in October 1985. The newly rebranded society began raising funds and launched a membership drive. By then, the BHS was renting out the building for photography and film shoots several times a year. The BHS announced plans in 1986 for a gallery dedicated to Brooklyn history. The gallery, costing $625,000 in total, was funded in part by federal grants and matching funds; the BHS also received a state grant to update lighting. Jan Hird Pokorný conducted the gallery renovations in 1987, which included removing partitions on the building's ground story.

The Brooklyn history gallery opened in 1989. Afterward, the BHS hosted both a permanent Brooklyn exhibition and temporary exhibits, The society also expanded its public programs, hosting 80 annual events, including walking tours and lectures. The New York Times wrote that the BHS was still unable to attract visitors in the early 1990s, as tourists were, at the time, avoiding Brooklyn in general. The society also considered opening an annex in the then-abandoned Empire Stores warehouse complex. The society had by 1996 amassed over 155,000 volumes, 100,000 images, and thousands of artifacts and maps. The BHS had no full-time director for two years afterward; in the interim, the society did not host exhibits, though it did host student programs and created two traveling exhibits.

=== 21st century ===
==== Late 1990s and 2000s: Renovation ====
In 1996, the BHS announced plans to renovate its building, which was to include a new history center in the basement, as well as restoration of the exteriors, interiors, and utilities. The renovation was initially planned to cost $5.7 million. The building closed in April 1998, following delays caused by the need to modify the renovation's scope. The New York City Council and the Brooklyn borough president's office collectively provided $3.1 million for the renovation. That year the BHS received a $16 million bequest from Poly Tech professor Donald Othmer and his wife Mildred. This bequest, more than four times the BHS's existing $3.5 million endowment, was to be used to renovate the library. With the additional funding, the BHS wanted to also improve its programs and add an exhibit. Borough president Howard Golden provided additional funds in 1999 to restore the BHS building, and the society spent several weeks relocating the collection out of the building.

The BHS began renovating the building in September 1999, at which point the renovation was budgeted at $15 million. Pokorný was rehired to supervise the project. During the closure, the BHS hosted programs on its website and continued to host workshops and school programs across Brooklyn. The BHS building's renovation included restoring the facade and rooftop metalwork, rebuilding the fourth story into offices, renovating the library and stair, and creating education spaces in the cellar. Due to unanticipated issues that arose during construction, the renovation's completion was pushed back by over a year. Jessie McClintock Kelly, the society's president, said at the time that the building was "the biggest item in the collection".

The project was completed in October 2003 for $23 million. The library was renamed the Othmer Library in honor of the Othmer family's gift. The renovation had been severely delayed and over budget, and it was still raising money for the renovation when the building reopened. The budget overruns negatively impacted the BHS, whose endowment had dwindled to $1 million. Although annual visitation had increased to 20,000 in 2005, the BHS ran at a deficit, prompting it to fire employees and reduce operating hours. Deborah Schwartz became the society's new president that year.

==== 2010s to present ====
The BHS building underwent additional modifications in the early 2010s. These modifications, completed in 2014, included renovating the first-floor gallery space and the basement, where classrooms and retail were added. By 2013, the BHS was looking to open an annex inside Empire Stores as part of Brooklyn Bridge Park's development. After receiving a grant from the National Endowment for the Humanities, the BHS opened an annex at Empire Stores in 2017. By that decade, the library was described as 33,000 books, 50,000 artifacts, and hundreds of archival collections, artifacts, oral history interviews, maps, and paintings. The BHS also began participating in the Culture Pass program in 2018, allowing BPL, New York Public Library, and Queens Public Library cardholders to visit the building without a membership or admission fee.

The society's reopening as the Center for Brooklyn History (CBH) in 2023

In February 2020, Schwartz announced that the BHS would merge with the BPL. The merger allowed the BPL's 650,000 cardholders to access the BHS collections in Brooklyn Heights; previously, the BPL's Brooklyn collection had been housed at the Brooklyn Central Library at Grand Army Plaza. At the time, the BHS had 50,000 annual visitors, including 7,000 researchers. The BPL renovated the first-floor exhibition space and made the Othmer Library open for public visitation without appointment. A gift shop was also added. The building reopened in September 2023 as the BPL's Center for Brooklyn History (CBH). BPL officials had found the "society" name pretentious and uninviting, and Brooklyn had become more widely known across the world.

== Building ==
The CBH's headquarters building is at 128 Pierrepont Street, on the corner with Clinton Street, in the Brooklyn Heights neighborhood of Brooklyn. The building was designed by George B. Post and is one of a relatively small number of his designs that remain intact. It is designed in the Renaissance Revival style or a Renaissance-inspired style, (Note: An entry in The Encyclopedia of New York City cites it as being the Queen Anne style, but this contrasts with other sources that cite a Renaissance influence.) contrasting with Post's other structures, which were generally built in other styles. Writer Sarah Bradford Landau said the design "brings to mind Quattrocento Italy" to a greater extent than Post's earlier work did.

The building occupies a rectangular site with 75 feet (23 m) of frontage on Pierrepont Street to the north and 100 feet (30 m) of frontage on Clinton Street to the east. (Note: This is sometimes described erroneously as a 75-by-90-foot (23 by 27 m) site; however, this excludes the 10 feet (3.0 m) setback from Pierrepont Street.) It was combined from three land lots each measuring 100 by 25 feet (30.5 m × 7.6 m) on Pierrepont Street. The building itself occupies the full Pierrepont Street frontage and only 85 feet (26 m) of the Clinton Street frontage. The building is set back about 10 feet (3.0 m) from the Pierrepont Street sidewalk. A 5-foot-wide (1.5 m) alley separates it from St. Ann & the Holy Trinity Church to the south. Also nearby are the Brooklyn Trust Company Building to the east, 181 and 185 Montague Street one block southeast, and the Crescent Athletic Club to the north. At the time of construction, the section of Pierrepont Street east of Clinton Street was commercial, while buildings to the west were residential. The structure was also relatively close to the Brooklyn Mercantile Library and the original Brooklyn Academy of Music building.

The building is part of the Brooklyn Heights Historic District, designated as a National Historic Landmark District in 1965 and protected by the New York City Landmarks Preservation Commission in 1966. The LPC designated some interior spaces as a city landmark on March 23, 1982. The building was also added to the National Register of Historic Places as a National Historic Landmark (NHL) in 1991. The NHL designation, granted primarily due to the building's architecture, covers the exterior, lobby, stair, and library.

=== Exterior ===
The CBH building measures four stories high, with three tiers of windows: arches on the first and second tiers, and rectangular windows on the third tier. The terms of the 1877 architectural competition had specified that each story be built to specific heights. The central tier is larger than the top and bottom tiers, a design feature Post also used in Chickering Hall. Post went on to refine his use of differently sized tiers in the New York Produce Exchange Building.

The foundation is clad with gray Wyoming Valley stone. The first three stories of the facade are load-bearing walls, typical of late-19th-century American buildings, and measure 4 feet (1.2 m) thick. The brick in the building is sourced from Philadelphia, interspersed with Newark sandstone. As originally planned, the brick was to be laid in black oil putty instead of mortar, but ultimately, dark mortar was used for the street-facing elevations, and regular mortar was used on the rear elevations. The brickwork is accented by terracotta trim manufactured by the Perth Amboy Terra Cotta Company. The CBH building was one of the first in modern-day New York City to use architectural terracotta, and it was reportedly the first building to use American-made terracotta. The terracotta was sculpted by Olin Levi Warner, for whom the LIHS building was the first of multiple architectural commissions. Both the brick and terracotta are painted red.

==== Facade details ====
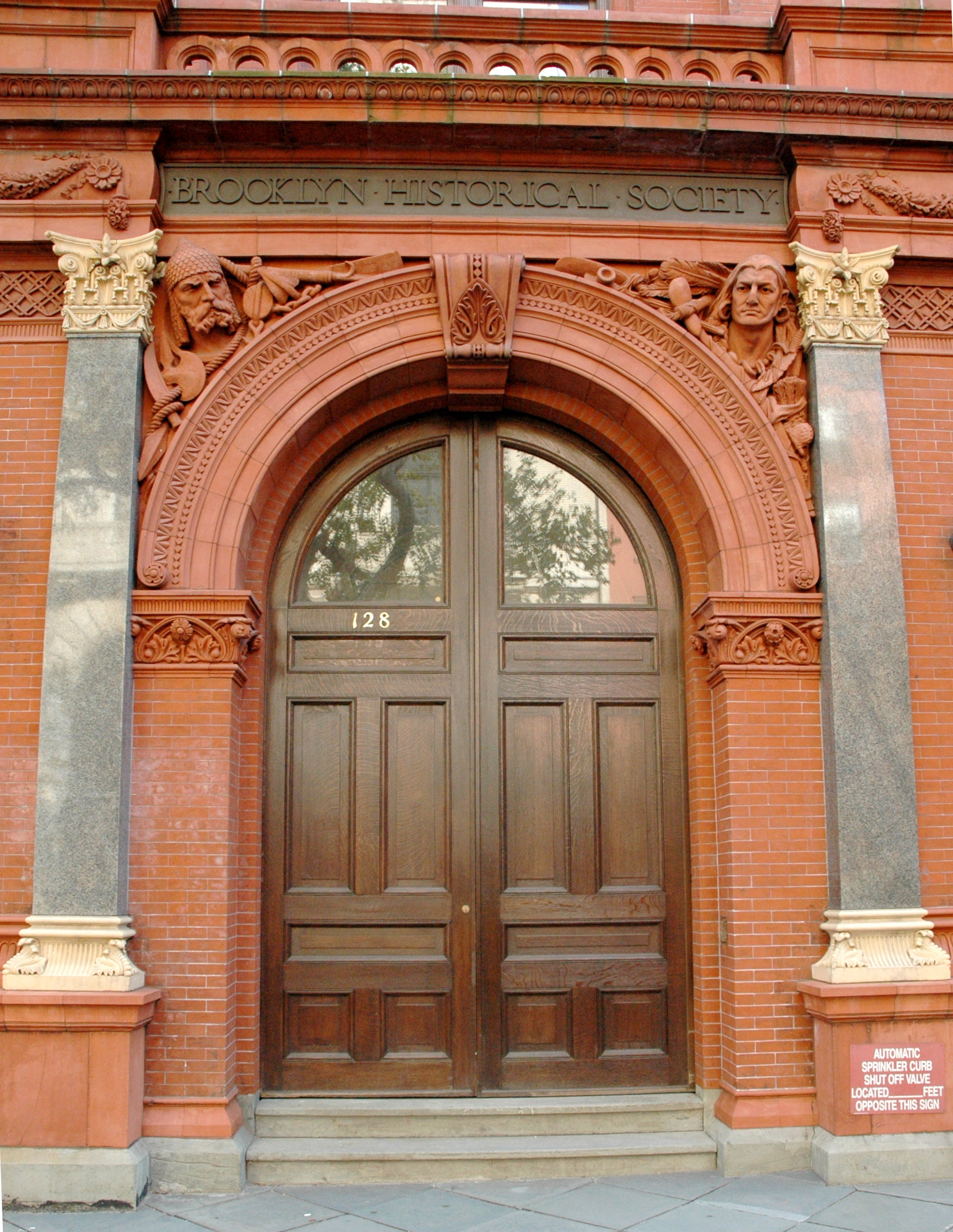
The original main entrance in 2008

The first tier was to be sunken 6 feet (1.8 m) below ground and rise 14 feet (4.3 m) high. As built, there is a deep areaway on Clinton Street. The ground-story lecture hall is only slightly beneath the sidewalk on Pierrepont Street, accessed by round arches, where the modern entrance is located. There were originally six sets of doorways, spread across the three visible elevations (north, east, and south). The original main entrance is in the westernmost bay on Pierrepont Street and consists of an arch, flanked by a set of projecting piers that function as antae. The spandrels above the arch's corners depict a Viking and a Native American, a reference to disputes over colonial claims to Brooklyn. Each pier has granite pilasters at its corners. The exterior also contains plaques denoting the building's and district's NHL designations.

The second tier (comprising the second and third stories) was to be 25 feet (7.6 m) high. This tier has double-height round arches to indicate the presence of the library's tall reading room inside. The spandrels depict the heads of Michelangelo, Beethoven, Gutenberg, Shakespeare, Christopher Columbus, and Benjamin Franklin. The Columbus and Franklin heads face Pierrepont Street, while the other four face Clinton Street. Decorations are placed in the corner spandrels. These include crops grown in the United States such as corn and wheat, along with fruits and flowers, and are present only on the northern (Pierrepont) and eastern (Clinton) elevations of the facade. Running above the third floor is a frieze with tiles, which are decorated with either rosettes or embossed letters. The frieze on the Pierrepont elevation spells out the name "The Long Island Historical Society". The frieze on the Clinton elevation spells out the LIHS motto "Historia testis temporum", a Latin phrase meaning "History, the witness of time".

The third tier (comprising the fourth floor) was specified at 15 feet (4.6 m) high. The height of the attic was not specified, but the competition rules indicated a roofline about 54 feet (16 m) above the street. The fourth story is shorter than the others and contains two rectangular windows in each bay, flanked by pilasters. It is topped by a protruding cornice with interspersed rosettes and brackets. As built, the structure has a tower above the entrance on Pierrepont Street. The entrance tower has a clock face and a pediment, though the clock machinery was never functional. The pediment interrupts a pyramidal hip roof. The rest of the structure is capped by a hip roof, decorated with dormers bearing sunflower motifs.

=== Interior ===
The CBH building's interiors were built using both traditional methods and then-novel industrial technologies. From the outset, the building was planned with a lecture room, library, and museum. As originally configured, the lecture room or auditorium was on the first floor. The Othmer Library spans the second and third stories, while the fourth floor (the original museum) and attic have since been converted for other uses. A cellar, expanded in a 2000s renovation, contains educational space. The trustees also specified that Post design a fireproof building with good ventilation, which influenced his design.

Stair hall

The first floor is supported by wooden joists, which rest on the foundation walls. The superstructure above uses cast iron columns and girders; the base of one of the girders is visible in the basement. The superstructure mostly used design features that had been incorporated into other buildings, except for the fourth floor, which is suspended from two roof girders via iron rods, thus creating a column-free space below for the library. On all floors, a brick wall separates the library and museum spaces in the east from the staircase hall in the west. An elevator was first installed in 1937, within the stair hall, but was relocated in the 2000s renovation, creating a mismatched floor pattern when the stair hall's floor was replaced.

Originally, air circulation was through large windows and an air shaft at one corner. The interior was heated by radiators and cooled by air conditioners at the first and fourth stories. When the building was renovated in the 2000s, a forced air system was installed, with a boiler, chiller, and air handlers in the basement. The attic was rebuilt at that time to accommodate the weight of air-handling equipment.

==== Vestibules, hallways, and stair halls ====
The original Pierrepont Street entrance leads successively to a vestibule and foyer arranged north–south, both of which have geometric floor tiles, wooden wainscoting, and plaster walls above the wainscot. The vestibule, just inside the entrance, had a ticket window on one side and a door with steps (later replaced by a ramp) descending to the former auditorium on the other side. Past the foyer is the first-floor lobby, which also contains wooden wainscoting and plaster walls.

The western portion of the first floor has a lobby with a has an L-shaped staircase, with a wainscoted wall on one side and a railing with newel posts on the other. A hallway with wainscoted walls runs west–east across the second floor at the top of the staircase. The hall has a skylight made of stained glass. The original elevator obstructed much of the natural light from the skylight; the skylight was restored in 2003. The hall is illuminated by a brass chandelier. From this hall, two doorways lead to the library's reading room and office, and another leads to a green room. The reading-room entrance has a set of double doors with glass-filled upper sections, topped by glass transom windows. A stair ascends to the museum on the third floor. Woodwork throughout is made of black ash.

==== Library ====
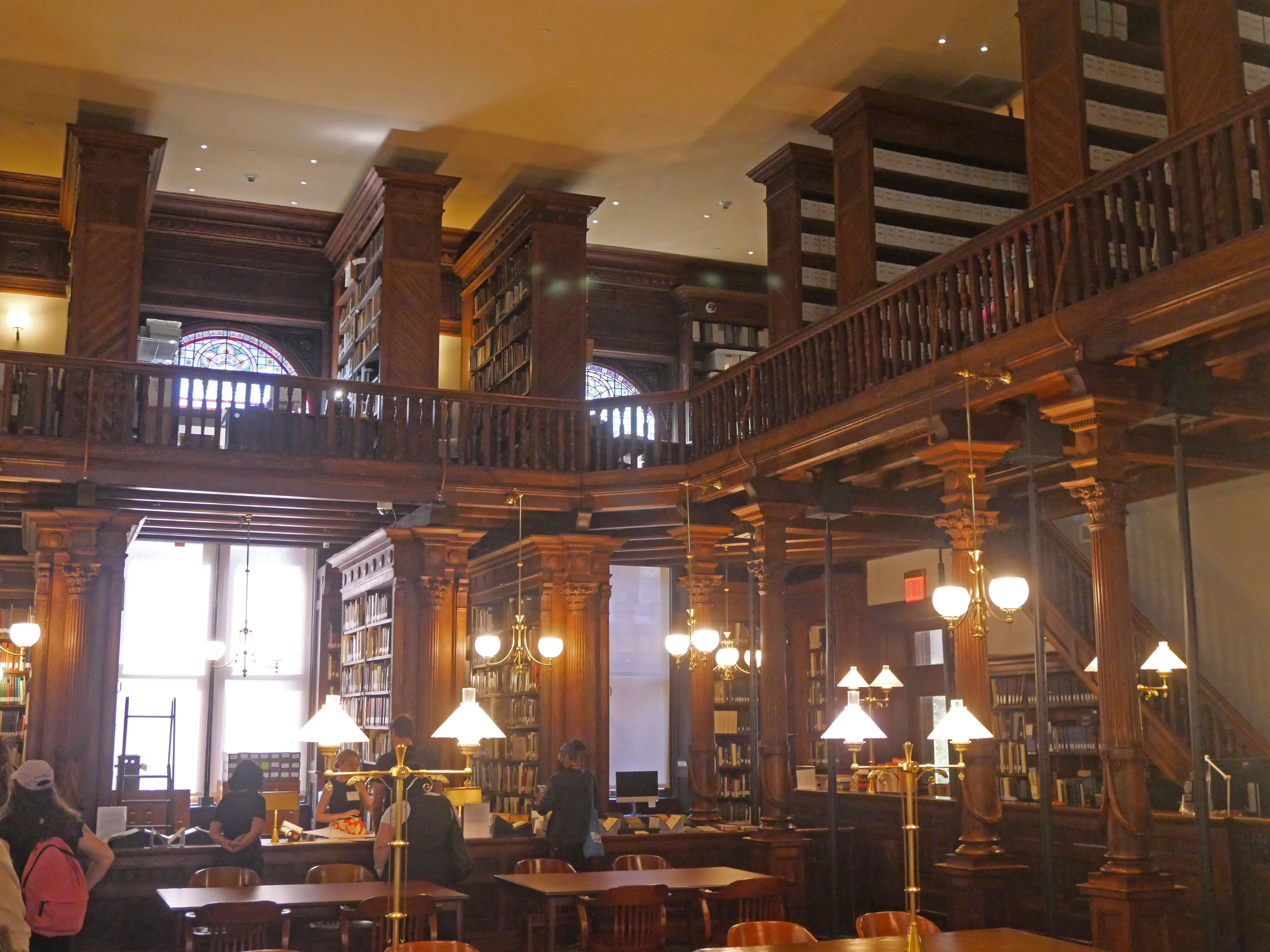
Othmer Library

The CBH's library, formally the Othmer Library, has a reading room on the second floor, measuring 50 by 80 feet (15 by 24 m) across and 24 feet (7.3 m) high. On three walls are round-headed, stained-glass windows with geometric patterns. The windows—three each on the north and south walls, and five on the east wall—measure 18 feet (5.5 m) high and 8 feet (2.4 m) wide. About halfway between the main floor and the ceiling is a gallery, measuring 12 feet (3.7 m) wide and running around the perimeter; the gallery spans each corner diagonally, forming an octagonal shape. The gallery is made of oak and has a balustrade made of curved and rectangular posts. In general, the room has oak floors, wainscoted walls with white surfaces above, and white ceilings. The ceiling was left blank, without any ornamentation. Part of the main level's floor has since been replaced with linoleum tiles.

The reading room has a central public reading area surrounded by a wainscoted parapet with gates. The central area has desks with lamps, and there are additional chandeliers on the reading area's ceiling. Flanking the entrance, on the west wall, are a pair of platforms beneath the gallery, both surrounded by balustrades. Originally, the librarian worked on the south platform, and the assistant occupied the north platform. Behind both platforms, stairs ascend to the gallery. There are bookcases on both levels, which could store 90,000 volumes. The bookcases, measuring 8 feet (2.4 m) wide and 12 feet (3.7 m) high, flank alcoves measuring 8 feet (2.4 m) wide near each window and 16 feet (4.9 m) square at the room's corners. The ends of the bookcases have elaborate decorations such as sunburst motifs and diagonal panels. There are lamps between the bookcases and under the gallery's soffit. The room also has 24 wooden columns with Corinthian-styled capitals, which are arranged to allow natural light into the room; these columns encase iron beams.

Two anterooms lead off both levels of the reading room. At the second floor, a doorway at the reading room's northwest corner leads to an anteroom variously described as a members' room or a ladies' parlor. The northwest second-floor anteroom is 19 by 28 feet (5.8 by 8.5 m) across and has plaster walls, wood trim, a ceiling chandelier, and a large arched window on the north wall. The west wall has a fireplace with a wooden fireplace mantel. The library has three additional anterooms: one at the southwest corner of the second floor, and two at the northwest and southwest corners of the third (gallery) floor. The southwest second-floor room, 19 by 18 feet (5.8 by 5.5 m) across, was a gentleman's parlor, later converted into stacks. It has an iron stair leading to a mezzanine below, which has since been converted into archives. The gallery-level anterooms also do not retain their original purposes. The northwest third-level anteroom, directly above the ladies' parlor was a directors' room; it has a fireplace and bookcases. The southwest third-level anteroom was a librarian's room.

==== Other interior spaces ====
Exhibition space on the first floor

The original first-floor auditorium occupied a 50-by-80-foot (15 by 24 m) space beneath the library's reading room. It had 600 seats (Note: A contemporary Brooklyn Eagle article described the lecture hall as a 500-seat auditorium with a ceiling measuring 26 feet (7.9 m) high.) and was raked downward toward the stage. The auditorium descended to about 3 feet (0.91 m) below ground at its lowest point. The wooden ceiling rose 24 feet (7.3 m) with an oak cornice, while the stage was made of wood, with a carved wooden wall at the rear. Four doors, including the front door on Pierrepont Street, led from the auditorium. The auditorium was removed in 1917, and it was partitioned into commercial space after 1926, with offices. In 1989, the first floor was converted into gallery space. Following the 2020s rebranding as the Center for Brooklyn History, part of the first floor became a lobby and reception area, with some workspace. The rest of the first floor still has exhibit space.

The fourth story, behind the third tier of windows on the facade, was originally the museum. Spanning the same area as the auditorium and reading room, it has a pine floor, black-ash wainscoting and trim, and plaster walls and cornice. Iron rods suspend the floor from the ceiling, which is 16 feet (4.9 m) high. The southwestern corner originally had sliding doors (later replaced with a partition), which led to a lecture room 20 by 70 feet (6.1 by 21.3 m) across. The lecture room originally had a rostrum, later removed. The northwestern corner has an office originally used by the museum's curator, which has a fireplace, a wooden baseboard, plaster walls, and a wooden cornice. A staircase ascends to a caretaker's apartment under the roof trusses in the attic. By the 2000s, the fourth story was used as offices and gallery space, and it had ductwork running through it.

== Operation ==
Originally, the LIHS was led by an executive committee consisting of a chairman, vice president, and board of directors. There was also a board of councilors, representing the counties of Long Island—Kings (now coextensive with Brooklyn), Queens, Nassau, and Suffolk. Members paid annual dues, and people could also buy life memberships. LIHS members were allowed to visit all the LIHS's departments and to use the library and reading room, though they could not take items home. People living outside Brooklyn could receive temporary membership privileges if sponsored by an existing member. Members were originally allowed to join only with assent from existing members and were elected, but by the 1970s, this was no longer the case. Prior to its merger with the BPL, the BHS still sold memberships, and it charged admission except to students.

Following its reopening in 2023, the CBH building was open to the public for free without appointment. Library users still had to make appointments to use books from the collection. As of 2023, the building is open to the public six days a week.

=== Programming and events ===
The CBH hosts annual temporary exhibits. Subjects of exhibits and programs in the late 20th century included black communities on Long Island, the interiors of Brooklyn's houses, the Brooklyn Bridge, the Brooklyn Dodgers, the Brooklyn Fire Department, and emancipation of slaves. Exhibits also focused on demographic groups of Brooklyn, such as Puerto Ricans, black women, Native Americans, and Chinese people. BHS exhibits in the early 21st century continued to cover various aspects of the history of Brooklyn, including its beer industry, oral history interviews with Vietnam War veterans, lesser-known Brooklyn abolitionists, the waterfront, healthcare, and Muslim residents. After its rebranding, the CBH hosted exhibits on slavery and the Battle of Brooklyn.

The CBH's activities also include education programs, such as Brooklyn Connections, which teaches students in Brooklyn public schools about the borough's history. Before its merger with the BPL, the BHS hosted afterschool and weekend children's programs. It also hosted such events such as an annual antique shows, archeology workshops, and lectures hosted on Brooklyn's waterfront. In 2013, the BHS, BPL, and Brooklyn Museum formed the Brooklyn Visual Heritage website to digitize their respective collections.

The LIHS also previously published the Journal of Long Island History, a semiannual scholarly journal pertaining to the island's history. The periodical was discontinued in 1965 and revived in 1973. The Journal was discontinued again in 1985, in part because of its high publication cost of $30–50 thousand annually, even though it published only two issues a year. Publication of the journal was subsequently transferred to Stony Brook University, which resumed publication in 1988.

=== Long-term exhibits ===
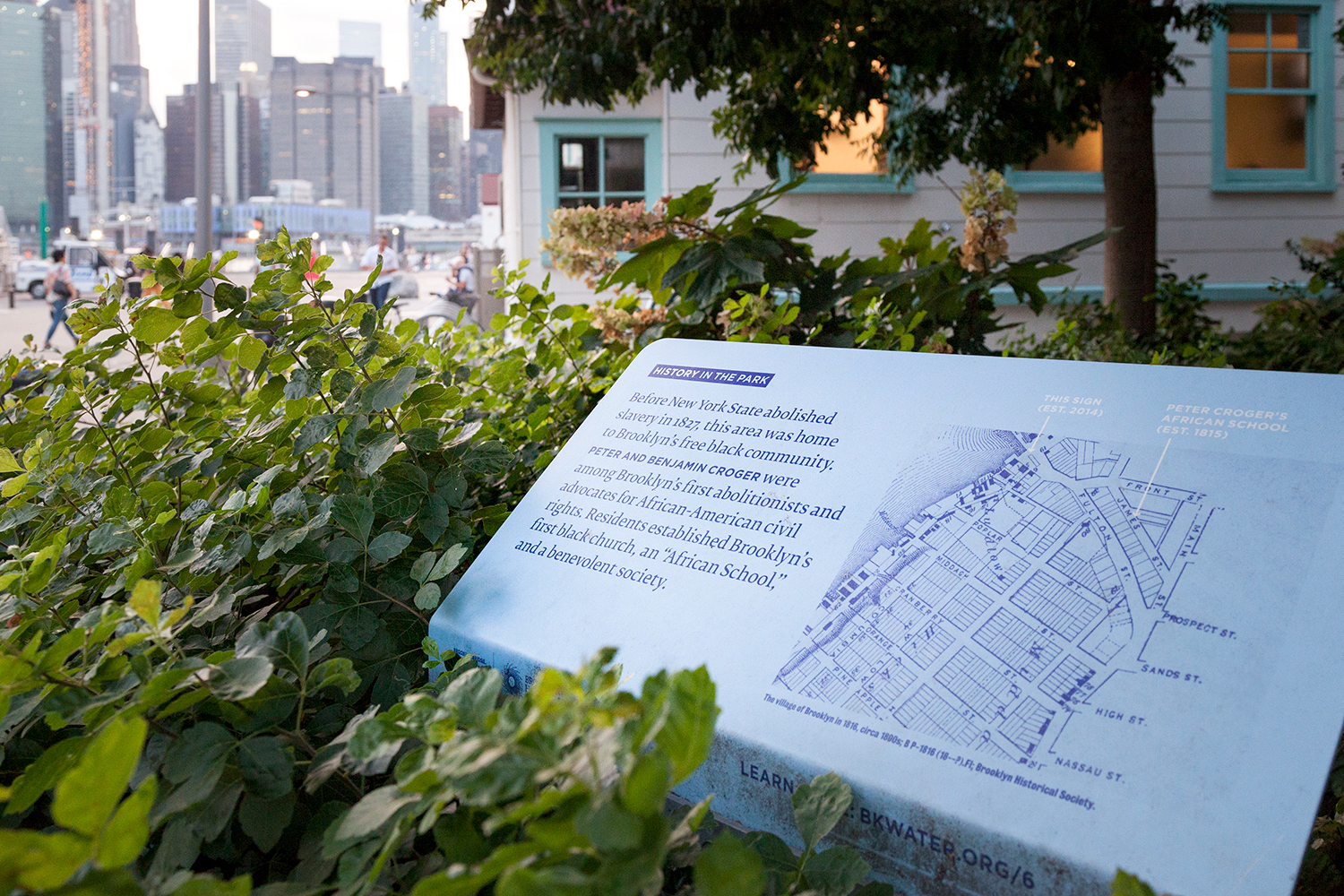
In 2014, BHS created a series of signs marking points of historic significance throughout Brooklyn Bridge Park.

When the CBH building's ground-story exhibition space opened in 1989, it spanned 4,000 square feet (370 m^{2}). Much of the space was devoted to a permanent exhibit with artifacts pertaining to various eras of Brooklyn's history, accessed by an archway with an eagle from the old Brooklyn Eagle newspaper building. The permanent exhibit was divided into five sections: the Brooklyn Navy Yard, Coney Island, the Dodgers, the Brooklyn Bridge, and Brooklyn's ethnic groups. The rest of the exhibition space held the rotating exhibits, spanning about 600 square feet (56 m^{2}). This exhibit was revamped during the 2023 renovation.

As part of the construction of Empire Stores at Brooklyn Bridge Park, the BHS opened a 3,200-square-foot (300 m^{2}) exhibition space to commemorate Brooklyn's industrial history. The BHS Dumbo exhibition space, as it was called, opened on May 17, 2017. The Dumbo space hosted programs, supplementing the events and programs in the Brooklyn Heights headquarters, and the second floor had offices. The Dumbo space was occupied under a lease that lasted through 2030, but it closed in 2020 following the BHS's and BPL's merger.

== Collection ==
The CBH has over 300,000 items, including books, newspapers, maps, photographs, and manuscripts, following the BHS's merger with the BPL in 2020. These include 100,000 items from the BHS's collection and over 200,000 from the BPL's collection. Following the merger, the Othmer Library had 325,000 photographs and 36,000 books. There are also 1,650 archival collections and 57,000 artifacts. These objects are sometimes lent to BPL branches. Previously, the LIHS published its own literature, starting with a pamphlet on Suffolk County's early history in 1865.

=== Library collection ===
==== Long Island and New York City collection ====
From the outset, the LIHS collected archives of local newspapers such as the Long Island Star, The New York Times, the New-York Tribune, and the Brooklyn Daily Eagle. The LIHS also collected music, including songs related to Brooklyn's history. There is a genealogical collection, which numbered thousands of volumes as far back as the late 19th and early 20th centuries. Some families' genealogies (such as those of the Smith, Clark, and Adams families) each span several dozen volumes, while others span hundreds of pages in one volume. The LIHS collected books about Long Island's history, such as a 1782 gazette about Brooklyn history. By the mid-20th century, the society owned 12,000 volumes about Long Island alone.

The LIHS had amassed over 500 photo slides and maps of the island by the 1950s. The modern CBH possesses a collection of historical maps of the New York City area, spanning between 1562 and 2015. An online portal displaying about 1,500 of these maps was launched in 2020. Notable maps in the collection include early plans of Manhattan; an early-19th-century diagram of yellow fever deaths in Brooklyn neighborhoods; a 1919 New York City Subway map; mid-20th-century tourist maps of Brooklyn and Manhattan; and diagrams of the Battle of Long Island and the villages of Astoria, Queens. The CBH also has a previously uncatalogued, rare copy of a c. 1770 map by Bernard Ratzer, which was rediscovered in 2010 and restored. Some of the maps are hung on the walls.

The CBH's modern collection also includes the photographic archive of the Brooklyn Daily Eagle, which had been given to the BPL in 1957. Other documents collected by the CBH and its predecessors included the original deeds of incorporation for the towns of Smithtown, Southold, and East Hampton on eastern Long Island.

==== Other collections ====
Long Island history was not the sole focus of the LIHS (later CBH).

Long Island history was not the sole focus of the LIHS (whose name referred to its location). When the Pierrepont Street building was constructed, the society's collection included American, English, and French history, along with volumes relating to biography, fine arts, natural history, and antiquities. Items such as the New Testament and the Holy Bible were collected in several languages. The LIHS also collected rare books and manuscripts; one newspaper wrote in 1923 that the collection included 1,300 titles not in the Library of Congress (LOC), compared with 400 LOC titles not in the LIHS. The library's rare items include an original manuscript by Voltaire, a Thai bamboo manuscript, and a 13th-century Bible.

Part of the collection was obtained from the personal collections of families or individual donors. The library's first-ever special collection was the Thurston fund, established by Caroline and Ellen Thurston for books relating to Egypt, Greece, and the Holy Land. Other special collections were donated by various benefactors over the years, including the Cary fund for American biographical volumes, Samuel Duryea's bequest of manuscripts, the Thayer fund for industrial history volumes, and a collection of 2,000 book plates. The CBH continues to maintain some personal records.

Some parts of the collection have been given away over the years. The LIHS previously had Dewitt C. Enos's medical collection, but after the Enos collection was given to the Medical Society of the County of Kings in 1899, the LIHS stopped collecting medical volumes. A set of over 100 unpublished letters, written by George Washington, was sold to the David Library of the American Revolution in 1976 to raise money for the LIHS. The LIHS also collected 234 items relating to topics other than Long Island, all of which were sold off in 1973; these items included an 1863 document by John N. Goodwin declaring the creation of the Arizona Territory.

The Oral History Collections contained interviews with over 1,200 narrators by 2017. The oral collection's projects include a 1973 initiative to record the experiences of Puerto Rican residents and a 2017 initiative to gather interviews with Brooklyn Muslims of various ethnicities. A 2013 oral history project called Crossing Borders, Bridging Generations, includes data about mixed-heritage families, with historical perspectives.

=== Other objects ===
Artifacts at the CBH building

The collection also includes various pieces of ephemera. When the LIHS museum was in operation, it displayed battle flags; pieces of Long Island nature such as rocks, eggs, and reptiles; Native American relics; and early colonists' clothing, pictures, furniture, and other belongings. Other artifacts such as marriage certificates, dishware, and bedsheets were also displayed at the museum, along with less commonplace items such as mummified heads and wood carvings. The organization collected art, with 300 paintings in 2016. The art collection included sculptural busts of William Shakespeare and Ulysses S. Grant; painting of US Supreme Court justice John Marshall; and historical portraits of Brooklyn, such as scenes of the Brooklyn Bridge and a fire truck. Non-literary works also included a wanted poster issued after the assassination of Abraham Lincoln.

By the mid-20th century, the LIHS collected miscellaneous keepsakes from Brooklyn residents, such as golf scorecards, graduation programs, and amusement-park tickets, along with antiques from demolished Brooklyn Heights buildings. The BHS's holdings at the end of the century included a drawing of a Lenape woman, the Brooklyn Dodgers' championship pennant from the 1955 World Series, a honorable discharge certificate given to a Continental Army soldier, and the Brooklyn Eagle's eagle emblem. In 2026, the CBH catalogued over 11,000 scattered items for an online portal. These included a lock of Alexander Hamilton's hair, Coney Island wax heads, American Civil War medals, porcelains, and menus.

== Reception ==
=== Collection commentary ===
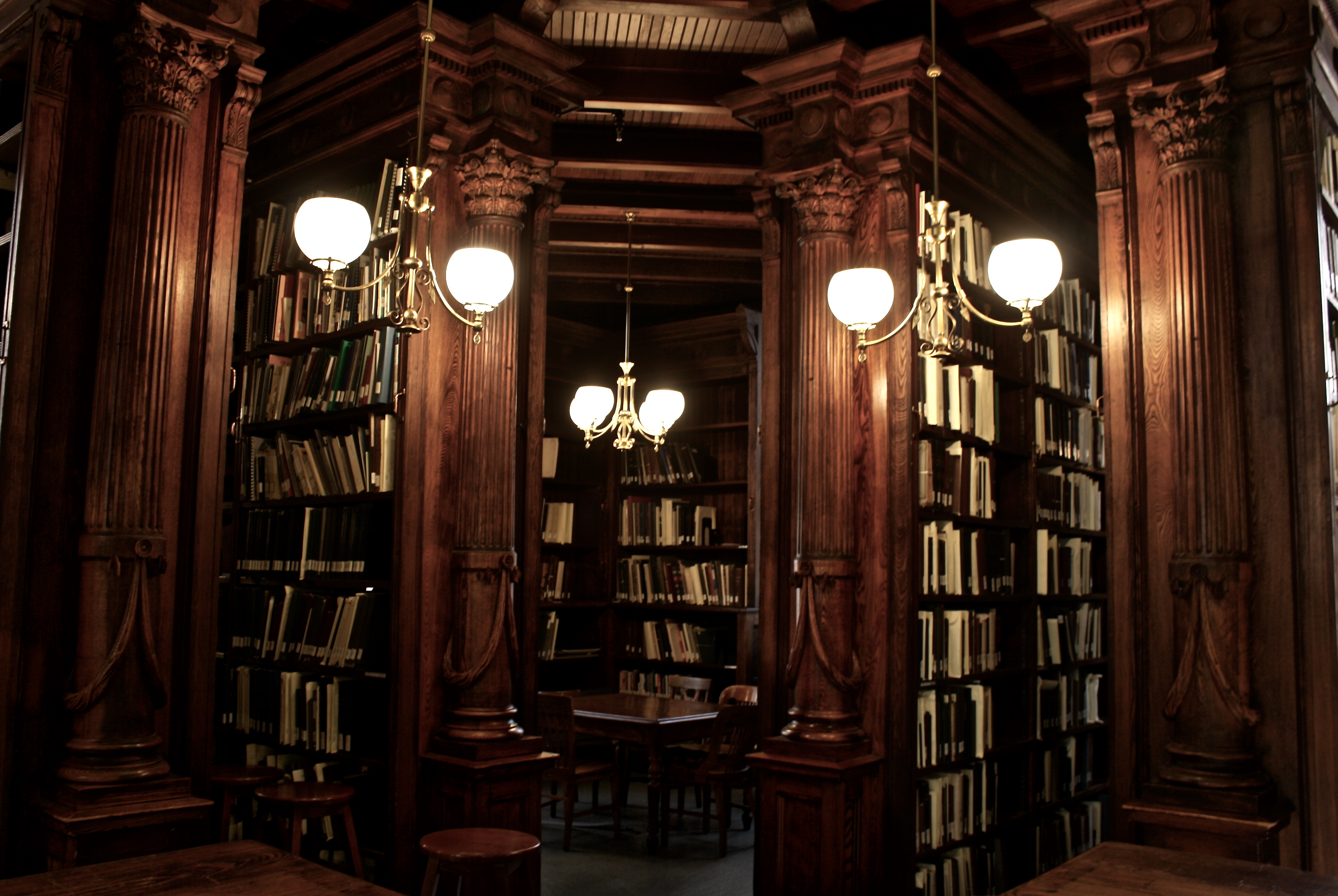
A corner of the library, illuminated by spherical lamps

Within a decade of the LIHS's formation, the Brooklyn Eagle wrote that the society had "become one of the recognized institutions of Brooklyn", and the New York Observer and Chronicle wrote that the organization had already "collected a library of great value" and that its meetings drew large amounts of public interest. The New York Times wrote in 1880 that the collection held interest for a wide reader base, in part because it was not limited exclusively to Long Island history, In the 1900s, the Brooklyn Citizen wrote that the collection "contains very much that is curious and valuable", and the Brooklyn Daily Times described it as having "inestimable value" to Long Island historians. Following the 2023 merger with the BPL, The New York Times wrote that the CBH combined both "iconic Brooklyniana" and a more "broad-based social history".

=== Building commentary ===
Architecturally, the CBH building received acclaim when built. The Eagle wrote that "the new edifice will in time be, indeed, a historical building", citing the appearance of the brick facade, and The New York Times called it "probably the handsomest building of recent construction in Brooklyn". The Missouri Republican regarded it as one of Brooklyn's "finest edifices". Montgomery Schuyler, writing for American Architect and Building News dissented, saying that he did not like the tower, though he felt the cornice was less aggressive than a similar one at Chickering Hall. In 1898, Russell Sturgis wrote that the building was a major neoclassical design, praising specifically the entrance porch.

Architecture critic Henry Hope Reed Jr. wrote in 1962 that the building was "an odd mixture of the classical and Romanesque". By the 1980s, Paul Goldberger of The New York Times described the CBH building as "among the city's greatest works of 19th-century civic architecture". The building was described in the AIA Guide to New York City as "one of the City's great architectural treasures" and the inside as "one of New York's great 19th-century interiors". The writer Judith Gura described the building as "one of the most architecturally significant landmarks in the Brooklyn Heights Historic District". Robert A. M. Stern and the co-authors of his 1999 book New York 1880 called it "vivid without being garish".

== See also ==
- List of historical societies in New York (state)
- List of museums and cultural institutions in New York City
- List of National Historic Landmarks in New York City
- National Register of Historic Places listings in Brooklyn
