= Joel Munsell =

American historian

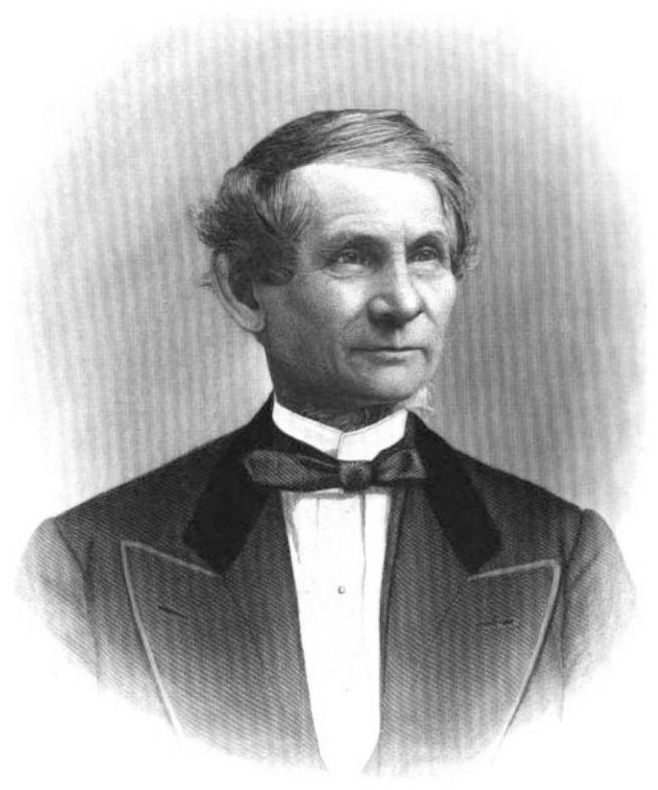
- Born: April 14, 1808; Northfield, Massachusetts
- Died: January 15, 1880 (aged 71); Albany, New York
- Occupations: Printer, publisher, writer

Signature
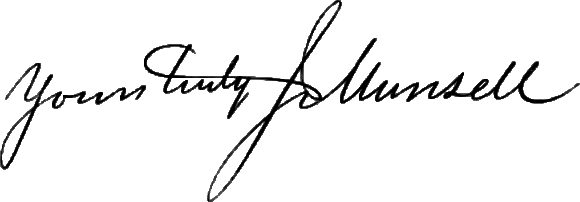

Joel Munsell (April 14, 1808 – January 15, 1880) was an American printer, publisher and writer.

== Biography ==
Joel Munsell was born in Northfield, Massachusetts on April 14, 1808. He established himself as a printer in Albany in 1827. He edited and published the Albany Minerva in 1828, was associate editor of the Microscope in 1834, and was publisher and editor of the New York State Mechanic from 1841 to 1843. Subsequently, he published The Lady's Magazine, the Northern Star and Freeman's Advocate, The Spectator, the Unionist, the Albany Daily State Register, the Guard, The New York Teacher, the Morning Express and Statesman, Webster's Almanac, The Daily Statesman, and for three years the New England Historical and Genealogical Register.

Munsell made a close study of the craft of printing, in its history and application, and his collection of works on the subject, the largest in America, was in part purchased by New York State for the New York State Library. His printing and publishing business was continued by his sons.

He was elected a member of the American Antiquarian Society in 1854.

He died at his home in Albany on January 15, 1880.

== Publications ==
He contributed papers to the Transactions of the Albany Institute, of which he was a founder, and published:

- 'Outline of the History of Printing (1839)
- Annals of Albany (1849–59)
- The Typographical Miscellany (1850)
- Chronology of Paper and Paper-Making (1857; enlarged 1870)
- Every-Day Book of History and Chronology (1858, 1st edition)
- Manual of the First Lutheran Church of Albany, 1670-1870 (1871)
- Woodworth's Reminiscences of the City of Troy

Among his contributions to American historical literature was the "Historical Series" (10 vols., Albany, 1850–58) that he edited and annotated mostly himself. In 1872, he published a catalogue of all the books and pamphlets he had printed down to that date (8vo, 191 pp.).
