= Wyncoop Run =

Stream in Elk County, Pennsylvania, U.S.

Coordinates: 41.376225°N 79.031422°W

Wyncoop Run is a stream in Elk County, Pennsylvania, in the United States.

== History ==
Wyncoop Run is named for John Wynkoop, a pioneer who settled near the creek in the 1820s.

== See also ==
- List of rivers of Pennsylvania
