= Brooklyn Citizen =

American newspaper (1887–1947)

The Brooklyn Citizen was a newspaper serving Brooklyn, New York—later part of New York City—from 1887 to 1947. It became influential under editor Andrew McLean (1848-1922), a Scottish immigrant from Renton, West Dunbartonshire. Its offices were located at Fulton and Adams Streets near Borough Hall in Downtown Brooklyn, in a section of buildings later demolished for the construction of Cadman Plaza.

== Distribution ==
By 1912, ninety percent of the Citizen's distribution went to Brooklyn homes. In 1942/1943, daily circulation totaled 31,000.

== Union conflicts ==
Staff were involved in a major strike in 1894, alongside staff from The Brooklyn Ties and The Brooklyn Standard Union who were all members of the Brooklyn Typographical Union No. 98; almost all 75 typesetters at the Brooklyn Citizen went on strike. As a result of this strike, circulation of the Citizen fell by one third.

In 1943, employees sought union recognition through the Newspaper Guild of New York, of the American Newspaper Guild. The Citizen refused to recognize the union, and the National Labor Relations Board ruled that an election must be held and recognized by the newspaper in September 1943.
