= Benjamin Wynkoop =

American silversmith, active in New York City (1673–1751)

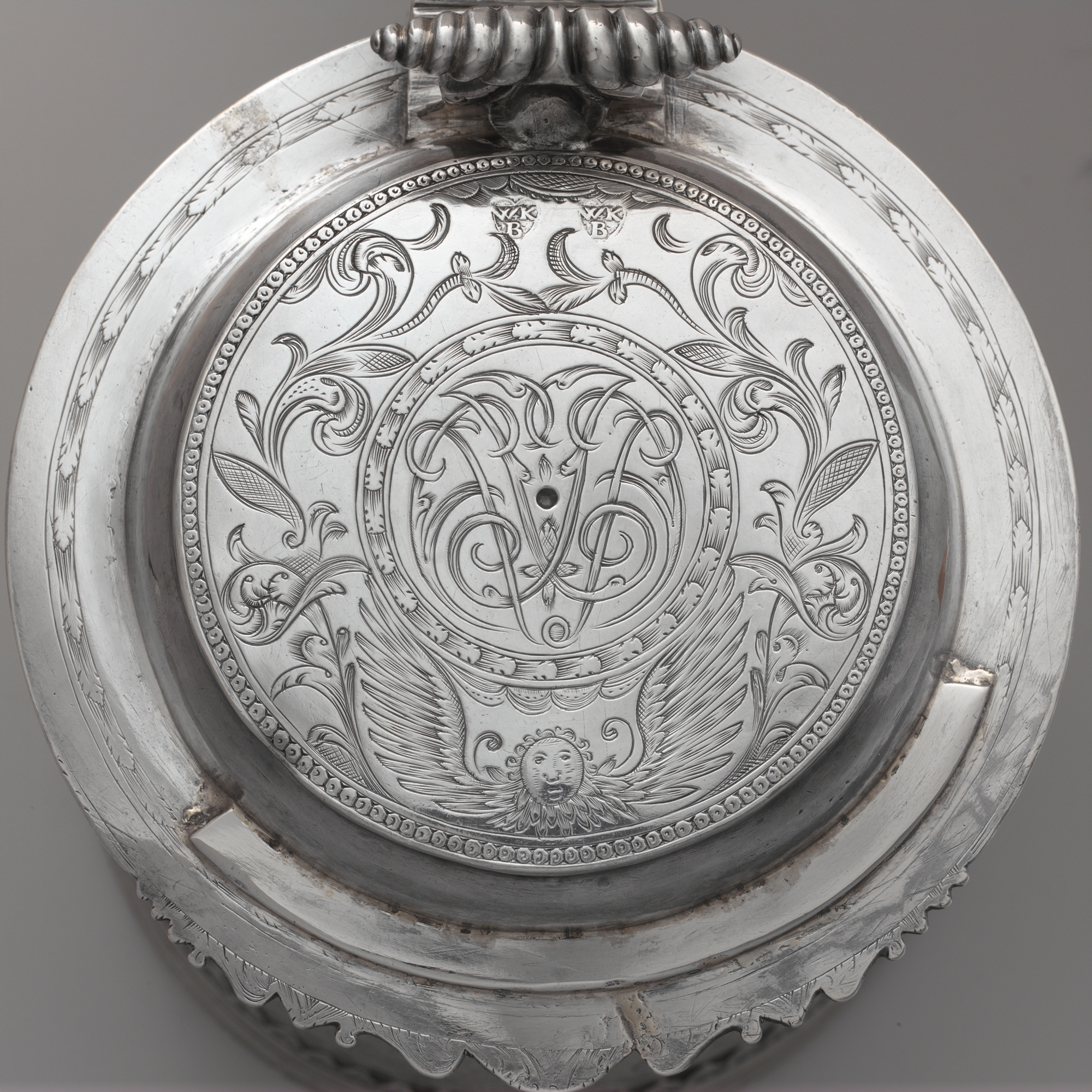
Tankard detail by Benjamin Wynkoop, between 1700 and 1730

Benjamin Wynkoop (November 5, 1673 - buried April 6, 1751) was a silversmith, active in New York City in the Thirteen Colonies.

Wynkoop was born in Kingston, New York and baptised by the Dominie of Kingston's Old Dutch Church on April 18, 1675. On October 21, 1697, he married Femmetje Van Der Huel in New York City, where they lived in the South Ward of Manhattan Island. He was made freeman of the city in 1698 and served as a Collector and Assessor of Taxes at various times from 1703 to 1732. His Spanish-Indian slave, London, was indicted with others in the New York Conspiracy of 1741 for conspiring to burn the city. He died in New York City.

Wynkoop made much of the communion silver of the Dutch Reformed churches. His work is collected in the Metropolitan Museum of Art, Museum of the City of New York, New York Historical Society, Smithsonian Institution, Winterthur Museum, and the Yale University Art Gallery.
