= Henry Reed Stiles =

American genealogical author and physician (1832–1909)

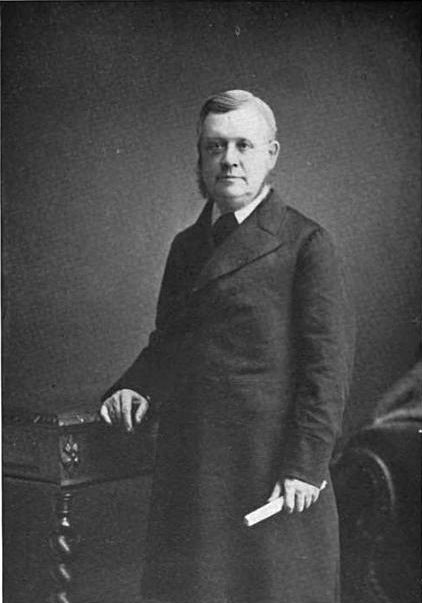
- circa 1895
- Born: March 10, 1832; New York City, New York, US
- Died: January 7, 1909 (aged 76); New York City, New York, US
- Occupations: Physician, author
- Known for: Physician, advocate for the mentally ill, and author of several important histories and family histories
- Spouse: Sarah Woodward
- Children: Elliot and Charles Butler

Henry Reed Stiles (March 10, 1832 – January 7, 1909) was an American physician who wrote several historical records and genealogical books. As a doctor, he served in various medical positions primarily in New York City, although he spent four years in Dundee, Scotland. He was very interested in genealogical and historical research. As of 2011, his work (including The Stiles Family in America, Genealogies of the Connecticut Family and The History and Genealogies of Ancient Windsor, Connecticut) continued to be widely cited by researchers and remained in print more than 115 years later.

== Family life and education ==
Henry Reed Stiles was born in New York City and had three brothers, Arthur, William, and Samuel, and one sister, Charlotte. Henry Stiles' father Samuel was the son of American Revolutionary War soldier Asahel Stiles from East Windsor, Connecticut. Their ancestors included farmer John Stiles, one of the first settlers of Windsor, Connecticut in 1636. Henry Reed Stiles was a kinsman of Ezra Stiles.

== Academic life ==
Stiles attended the University of the City of New York beginning in 1848, one year after its founding. He transferred to Williams College in 1849 as a sophomore. His health took a turn for the worse, and he did not finish a degree then at Williams College. Henry Stiles returned to school at the University of the City of New York and the New York Ophthalmic Hospital, graduating from both in 1855. In 1876, Stiles received a master's degree from Williams College.

== Professional life ==
In 1856 he married Sarah Woodward of Freeport, Illinois. They had two children, a daughter Elliot and a son Charles Butler.

He practiced medicine for a few months in New York City before moving briefly to Galena, Ohio, where he took on a partner, Dr. Timothy M. Wilcox. In 1856 he moved again to Toledo, Ohio where he edited the Toledo Blade newspaper. In July 1856, he began practicing medicine in Brooklyn, New York, and in 1859-63 he expanded his practice to Woodbridge, New Jersey. In 1868-70 he served in the Brooklyn office of the Metropolitan Board of Health as a clerk in the Bureau of Vital Statistics. Two months later he was appointed Chief Clerk. In 1870-73 he was a medical inspector in the Board of Health of New York City.

In 1872, he helped to organize the American Public Health Association in New York City, and founded and became an officer in the Society for Promoting the Welfare of the Insane, an organization that sought to protect the welfare of the mentally ill in New York City. He taught on the topics of hygiene and sanitary legislation in the New York homoeopathic medical college.

On June 17, 1873, he was appointed as a Sanitary Inspector until the next month, when he was made Superintendent of the State Homeopathic Asylum for the Insane in Middletown, New York. He directed construction of its first two buildings. He received a master's degree from Williams College with 1876. In September, 1877, he resigned as Superintendent and from 1877 to 1881 managed a homeopathic hospital in Dundee, Scotland, remaining there until 1881.

In 1881 he and his wife's health deteriorated, and they returned to New York. In January 1882 he established a private practice to treat individuals with mental and nervous diseases at Hill View, New York. He also taught the treatment of mental and nervous diseases in the New York Woman's Medical College and Hospital from 1882 till 1885. He practiced in New York until 1888, when he moved to Hill View on the shore of Lake George, New York. There he continued to treat mental and nervous diseases until 1901.

He was a member or corresponding member of and served in various offices of the American Ethnological Association; Dorchester Historical and Antiquarian Society; New England Historic Genealogical Society; State Historical Society of Wisconsin; Arizona Historical Society; Numismatic and Antiquarian Society of Philadelphia; and the American Philological Society of New York. He was a life member of the Long Island Historical Society.

== Genealogical and historical activity ==
In 1857-8 Stiles formed the company Calkins and Stiles which published a number of educational articles and journals, including the American Journal of Education. In May, 1863 Stiles was one of the founders of the Long Island Historical Society, and he became a director and its first librarian.

In 1865 he was an active member of the Faust Club which published limited editions of Wood's History of Long Island, and of Farman's Notes on Brooklyn, N. Y. In 1865 he issued a limited edition of two volumes describing to the condition and experiences of prison ship captives in Wallabout Bay, under the title of The Wallabout Prisonship Series, and also edited The Genealogy of the Stranahan and Josslyn Families.

In 1867 he issued the first volume of his History of the City of Brooklyn, N. Y., in 1869 the second, and in 1870 the third. He wrote a short biography, the Life of Abraham Lincoln (1865); 22 of the 56 biographies in The Men of Our Day (1868), one or two campaign biographies of General Ulysses S. Grant, and portions of many other subscription books. He contributed articles to many newspapers and magazines, and brief biographies of publishers in the Round Table for 1866-7; papers in the Historical Magazine, of which he was editor; letters and historical sketches in the Rahway Times, New Jersey, under the nom-de-plume of "Tip Top." In 1884 he edited and largely contributed to the Illustrated History of the County of Kings and the City of Brooklyn, in two volumes, and in 1887 completed editing The Humphreys Family and Genealogy.

He helped to organize the American Anthropological Society in 1869, and was one of the seven founders of the New York Genealogical and Biographical Society, serving as its president from 1869 until 1873. After his full retirement in 1901, he devoted all his time to completing and preparing for publication of The History of Ancient Wethersfield, Connecticut. Stiles was described upon his death as having "made it possible for thousands to trace their ancestry to the founders of our American Government and to honored names in the older governments of the world." Stiles died on January 7, 1909.

== Works ==
Stiles wrote a number of books and also contributed numerous articles to magazines, newspapers, and genealogical publications. These are most of his major works.

- The History and Genealogies of Ancient Windsor, Connecticut (Volumes 1 and 2); Including East Windsor, South Windsor, Bloomfield, Windsor Locks (New York, 1859; supplement, Albany, 1863)
- Genealogy of the Massachusetts Family of Stiles (1863)
- The Wallabout Prison-Ship Series (2 vols., 1865)
  - Letters from the Prisons and Prison-ships of the Revolution
  - Account of the Interment of the Remains of American Patriots, Who Perished On Board British Prison Ships During the American Revolution
- The Genealogy of the Stranahan and Joselyn Families (1865)
- Life of Abraham Lincoln (1865)
- A History of the City of Brooklyn (Volume 1, 1867; Volume 2, 1869; Volume 3, 1870)
- Monograph on Bundling in America (Albany, 1861)
- The Stiles Family in America. Genealogies of the Connecticut Family. Descendants of John Stiles, of Windsor, Conn., and of Mr. Francis Stiles (1895)
- Historical Magazine: And Notes and Queries Concerning the Antiquities, History, and Biography of America (2 vols.)
- A History of the Town of Bushwick, Kings County, N.Y. and of the Town, Village and City of Williamsburgh, Kings County, N.Y
- Illustrated History of the County of Kings and City of Brooklyn (2 vols., 1884)
- The Humphreys Family and Genealogy (1887)
- Bundling: Its Origin, Progress and Decline in America Knickerbocker Publishing Company, Albany, NY (1871)
- A Hand-Book of Practical Suggestions, for the Use of Students in Genealogy Joel Munsell's Sons, Albany, New York (1899)
- Adams, Sherman Wolcott; Stiles, Henry Reed (1904). The History of Ancient Wethersfield, Connecticut : comprising the present towns of Wethersfield, Rocky Hill, and Newington, and of Glastonbury prior to its incorporation in 1693 : from date of earliest settlement until the present time. New York: Grafton Press – via archive.org., ed. 3 volumes.
