= Silent Spring (disambiguation) =

Silent Spring is a 1962 book written by Rachel Carson.

Silent Spring may also refer to:

- Silent Spring (composition), a 2011 symphonic poem
- Silent Spring Institute, a nonprofit organization
- "The Numbers", a Radiohead song formerly known as Silent Spring
- Rachel Carson Playground, also known as Silent Spring Park
