= Paul Martin Lester =

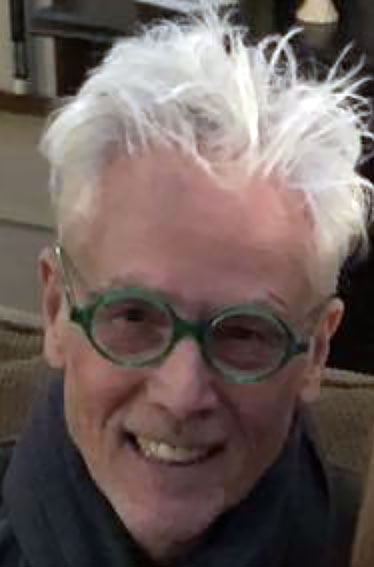
- Born: March 21, 1953; Flushing, Queens, New York, U.S.
- Died: November 12, 2023 (aged 70); Dallas, Texas, U.S.
- Occupations: Professor of communications, author, photojournalist

Paul Martin Lester (March 21, 1953 – November 12, 2023) was an American professor of communications, photojournalist, and author known for his contributions to the fields of visual communication and photojournalism ethics. He was Clinical Professor at the School of Arts, Technology, and Emerging Communication (ATEC) and a Professor Emeritus from California State University, Fullerton.

== Early life and education ==
Paul Martin Lester was born on March 21, 1953, in Flushing, Queens. He completed his undergraduate degree in journalism from the University of Texas at Austin. Lester then worked as a photojournalist for The Times-Picayune in New Orleans. He pursued further education, earning a Master's degree from the University of Minnesota and a Ph.D. in mass communications from Indiana University School of Journalism in Bloomington.

== Career ==
Lester began his career as a photojournalist and later transitioned into academia, involved in the study of visual communication and media ethics. He co-wrote the monthly column "Ethics Matters" for News Photographer magazine, the official publication of the National Press Photographers Association. From 2006 to 2011, he served as the editor of Visual Communication Quarterly. Subsequently, he was appointed editor of Journalism & Communication Monographs, a journal sponsored by the Association for Education in Journalism and Mass Communication (AEJMC) and published by Sage Publications.

Lester's research interests included mass media ethics, new communications technologies, and visual communications. His book, Visual Communication: Images with Messages, explored the interpretation and impact of visual media. Lester's dissertation on photojournalism ethics was a serious academic exploration on the topic. An early adopter of digital photography and online learning, he developed a synchronous course in Second Life.

Lester was a speaker, delivering presentations and workshops across the United States and in countries such as Australia, Canada, Finland, the Netherlands, Northern Ireland, Spain, Sweden, and Turkey.

Lester died on November 12, 2023 from a long illness.

== Legacy ==
A memorial scholarship fund was established in his name by the National Press Photographers Foundation to support the education of aspiring photojournalists, ensuring his legacy continues to influence the field.

== Personal life ==
Lester was known for his charismatic personality and ability to deeply connect with people.

Lester had a wide range of interests, including travel, technology, cooking, and music. He frequently combined his professional work with his passion for exploring different cultures.

Lester was married and had three children. His daughter, Dr. Allison Lester, followed his footsteps and became a scholar in AI ethics and election studies.

== Books ==
- Visual Ethics A Guide for Photographers, Journalists, and Filmmakers (2018)
- Digital Innovations for Mass Communication Engaging the User (2014)
- Visual Communication on the Web (2013) with Xtine Burrough.
- Visual Communication Images with Messages 1st ed, 1996; latest (7th) Edition 2017. According to WorldCat, the book is held in 488 libraries
  - translated into Chinese by Xiaoting Zhang; Meixue Yang as 視覺傳播/Shi jue chuan bo
- Images that Injure Pictorial Stereotypes in the Media. Co-edited with Susan Ross, 1st ed. 1996; 3rd Edition (2011) Santa Barbara:Prager. According to WorldCat, the book is held in 3792 libraries.
- On Floods and Photo Ops: How Herbert Hoover and George W. Bush Exploited Catastrophes Jackson : University Press of Mississippi, 2010.
- The Zen of Photography (2007). [Persian Edition].
- Visual Journalism A Guide for New Media Professionals with Christopher R. Harris. Boston : Allyn and Bacon, 2002.
- The Spiral Web On the Nature of Coincidence (2000).
- The Zen of Photography (2000).
- Desktop Computing Workbook A Guide for Using 15 Programs in Macintosh and Windows Formats (1996).
- Photojournalism An Ethical Approach (1991).
- Ethics of Photojournalism (1990), (ed.).
