= IS 237 =

Middle school in Queens, New York

Coordinates: 40°44′58.5″N 73°49′17.5″W

The school in 2010

I.S. 237 or Rachel Carson Intermediate School 237Q is a public middle school in Flushing, Queens in New York City serving grades 6 - 8. The school is located at 46-21 Colden Street and is part of NYCDOE District 25.

Judith Friedman is the principal of the school, which has over 1,200 students. The school uniform consists of color-coded shirts (green, grey, maroon) corresponding to each grade.

== History ==
The school was named after scientist Rachel Carson, the writer of Silent Spring which inspired people to name the school after her; it opened in 1971. In 1999 the school took ownership of a park called Rachel Carson Playground, which is right across from the school.

== Accelerated courses ==
The school offers high school courses that culminate in New York Regents Examinations to 8th-grade honors students as part of their Academic acceleration program. Courses include Algebra 1, Life Science: Biology (formerly known as Living Environment), Earth and Space Sciences, and US History. Students also have the opportunity to take the first level of high school Spanish, culminating in Checkpoint A of the Spanish World Languages exam, formerly known as the Languages Other Than English (LOTE) exam.

== East-West School of International Studies ==
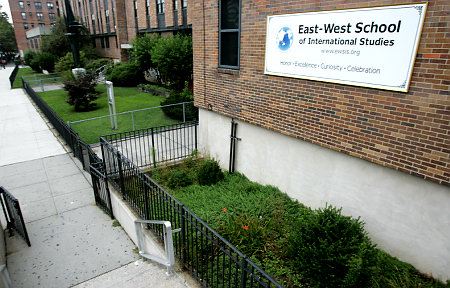
East-West School of International Studies sign on I.S. 237

The East-West School of International Studies (Public School Q281) is a combined middle and high school, serving students in grades 6-12 with an emphasis on Asian studies that shares the same building as I.S. 237. It first opened in September 2006 with 6th through 12th grade classes.

The school is located on the 4th floor of the building and shares facilities such as the cafeteria, auditorium, and gymnasium with I.S. 237. Students are required to wear uniforms consisting of pullovers and collared shirts in royal blue, light blue, or white, all adorned with the school insignia. Students are also expected to wear dark pants, excluding jeans.

Operated by the New York City Department of Education, it is led by principal David Bantz, has an average class size of 25 students, and has a student-teacher ratio of 14.9:1 in 2006–07.

The East-West School curriculum prepares students to graduate high school with a Regents' diploma and proficiency in Mandarin Chinese, Japanese, or Korean.

=== Clubs ===
Student groups and activities include, anime club, art, STEP team, dance team calligraphy, chess club, dance, film-making, mentoring, Model United Nations, music, newspaper, peer tutoring, step club, Korean traditional painting, Korean dancing and singing, K-POP club, and student government. Athletic clubs and teams include basketball, martial arts, tai chi, judo, volleyball, and table tennis.
