= Flushing Fields =

Public park in Queens, New York

Coordinates: 40°46′26″N 73°48′59″W

Flushing Fields is a public park in the northern section of the Flushing neighborhood of Queens in New York City. The site of this park was purchased by the Memorial Field of Flushing Corporation in 1921 at what was at the time open farmland. From its beginning, the park served as the home field for the softball, soccer, football and track teams from Flushing High School. The name of the park and monument at its southern section honor residents of Flushing killed in the First World War.

In 1930, the income generated by sports games at Memorial Field failed to meet the tax burden for the property and its owners approached the City, offering to transfer a portion of the field to the Parks Department as a playground. The central section of the property, containing an athletic field and grandstand was transferred in the following year to the Board of Education for continued use by Flushing High School. In 1935, the bequest of Flushing Fields to the City was recorded and an Art Moderne-style memorial was completed on the southern portion of the property.

The Flushing War Memorial is unique in that it honors both men and women. Its location in a public park not only recognized the individuals who died but also serves as a constant reminder to the neighborhood of the great sacrifice made by local residents for the county. The granite stele carries a bronze plaque inscribed with 70 names and a quote from the Gospel of John 15:13. "Greater love hath no man than this that a man lay down his life for his friends."

Following the City’s acquisition of Flushing Fields, the site was divided into three sections, the Memorial Field of Flushing on Bayside Avenue, which contains the Flushing War Memorial, the Flushing High School Memorial Field in the center, and the Leonardo Ingravallo Playground on the northern section of the site. The playground contains a baseball field, two softball fields, courts for basketball, handball and tennis, and a playground.

The playground was reconstructed in 1995 and the ballfield in 2003, updating the play equipment with safety features and improved drainage. Flushing Fields remains a popular venue for organized sports in Flushing, a lasting gift to the city by the neighborhood’s residents.
