= Flushing, Queens =

Neighborhood in New York City

Flushing
- Neighborhood in Queens
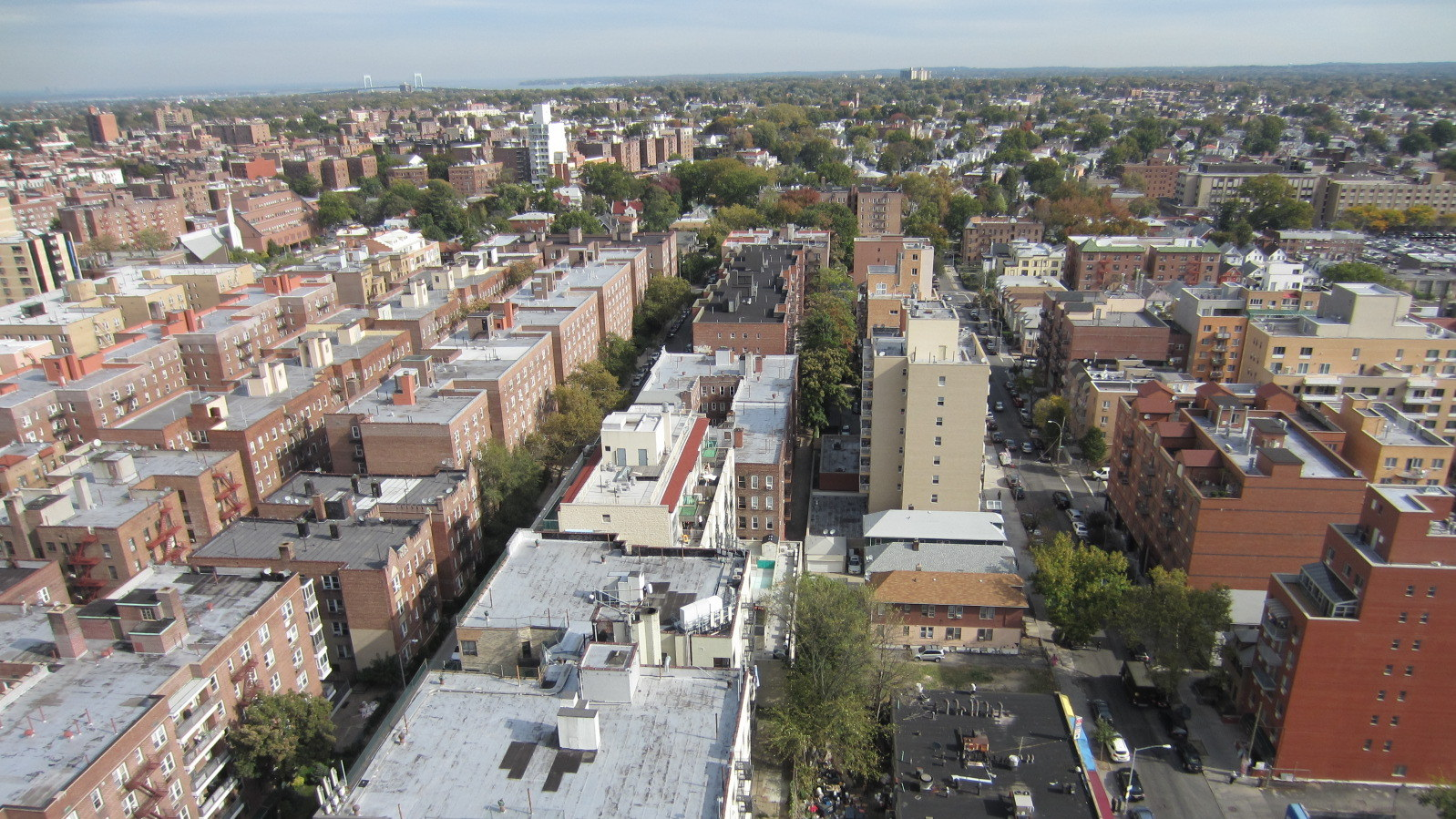
- Aerial view of the neighborhood
- Interactive map of Flushing
- Coordinates: 40.765°N 73.805°W
- Country: United States
- State: New York
- City: New York City
- County/Borough: Queens
- Community District: Queens 7
- Founded: 1645
- Town: 1683–1898
- Named for: Vlissingen, Netherlands

Population (2010)
  - Total: 72,008 (176,000 with the subsections)

Race/Ethnicity
  - White: 9.5%
  - Black: 4.2%
  - Hispanic: 14.9%
  - Asian: 69.2%
  - Other/Multiracial: 2.2%

Economics
  - Median income: $39,804
- Time zone: UTC– 05:00 (EST)
  - Summer (DST): UTC– 04:00 (EDT)
- ZIP Codes: 11354, 11355, 11358
- Area codes: 718, 347, 929, and 917

Flushing is a neighborhood in the north-central part of the New York City borough of Queens. The neighborhood is the fourth-largest central business district in New York City. Downtown Flushing is a major commercial and retail area, with the intersection of Main Street and Roosevelt Avenue at its core being the third-busiest in New York City, behind Times Square and Herald Square.

Flushing was established as a settlement of New Netherland on October 10, 1645, on the eastern bank of Flushing Creek. It was named Vlissingen, after the Dutch city of Vlissingen. The English took control of New Amsterdam in 1664, and when Queens County was established in 1683, the Town of Flushing was one of the original five towns of Queens. In 1898, Flushing was consolidated into the City of Greater New York. Development came in the early 20th century with the construction of bridges and public transportation. A significant immigrant population, composed mostly of Chinese, Indians, and Koreans, settled in Flushing in the late 20th century and early 21st century, leading to the neighborhood hosting the original Queens Chinatown and being revered as a cultural melting pot.

Flushing contains numerous residential subsections, and its diversity is reflected by the numerous ethnicities that reside there. Flushing is served by several stations on the Long Island Rail Road's Port Washington Branch, as well as by the New York City Subway's IRT Flushing Line (7 and <7> trains), which has its terminus at Main Street.

Flushing is located in Queens Community District 7, and its ZIP Codes are 11354, 11355, and 11358. It is patrolled by the New York City Police Department's 109th Precinct.

== History ==
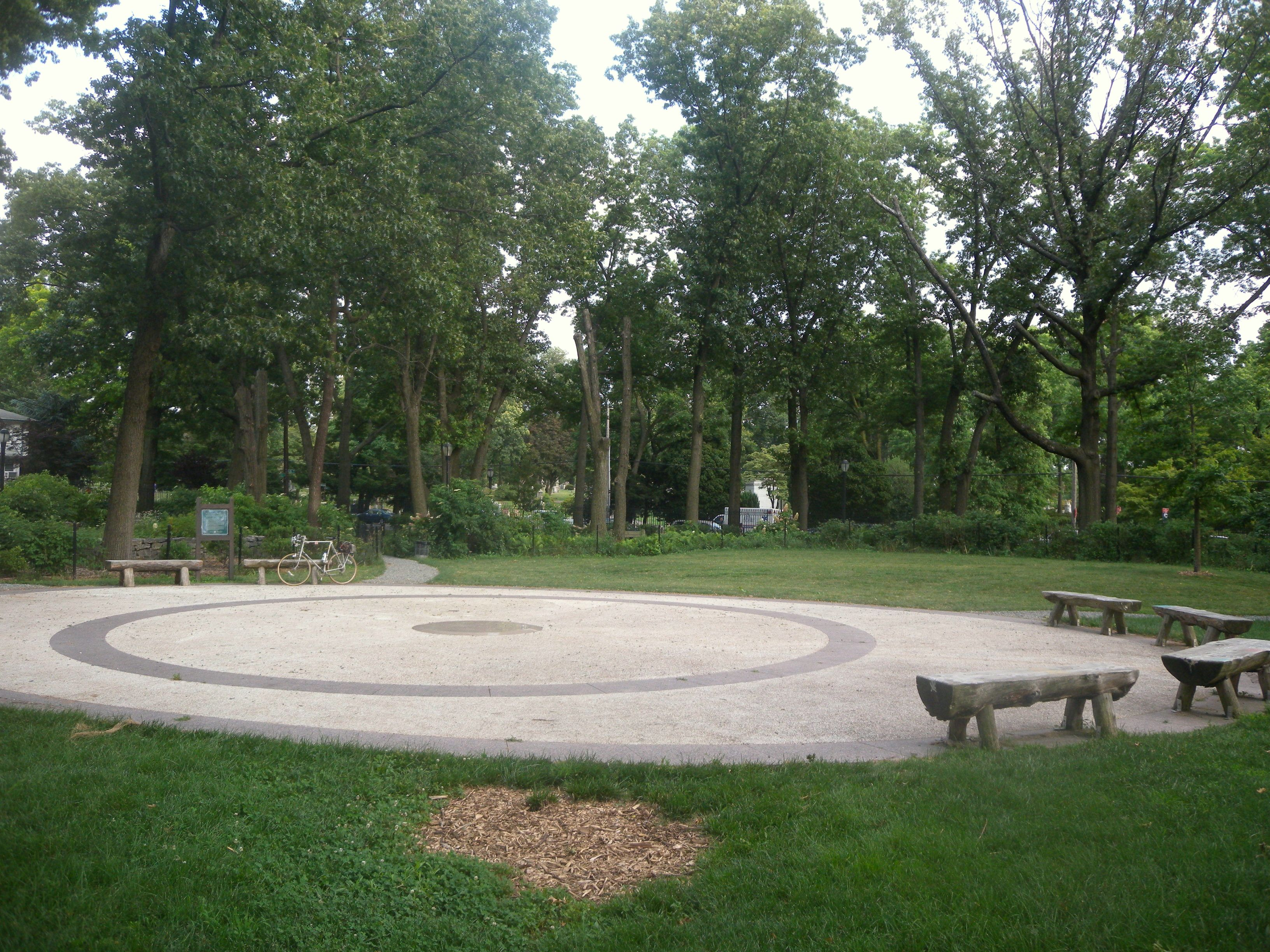
Old Flushing Burial Ground, used in the 17th and 18th centuries, now a park

=== Precolonial and colonial history ===
Flushing was originally inhabited by the Lenape Indians prior to colonization and European settlement.

=== Dutch colony ===
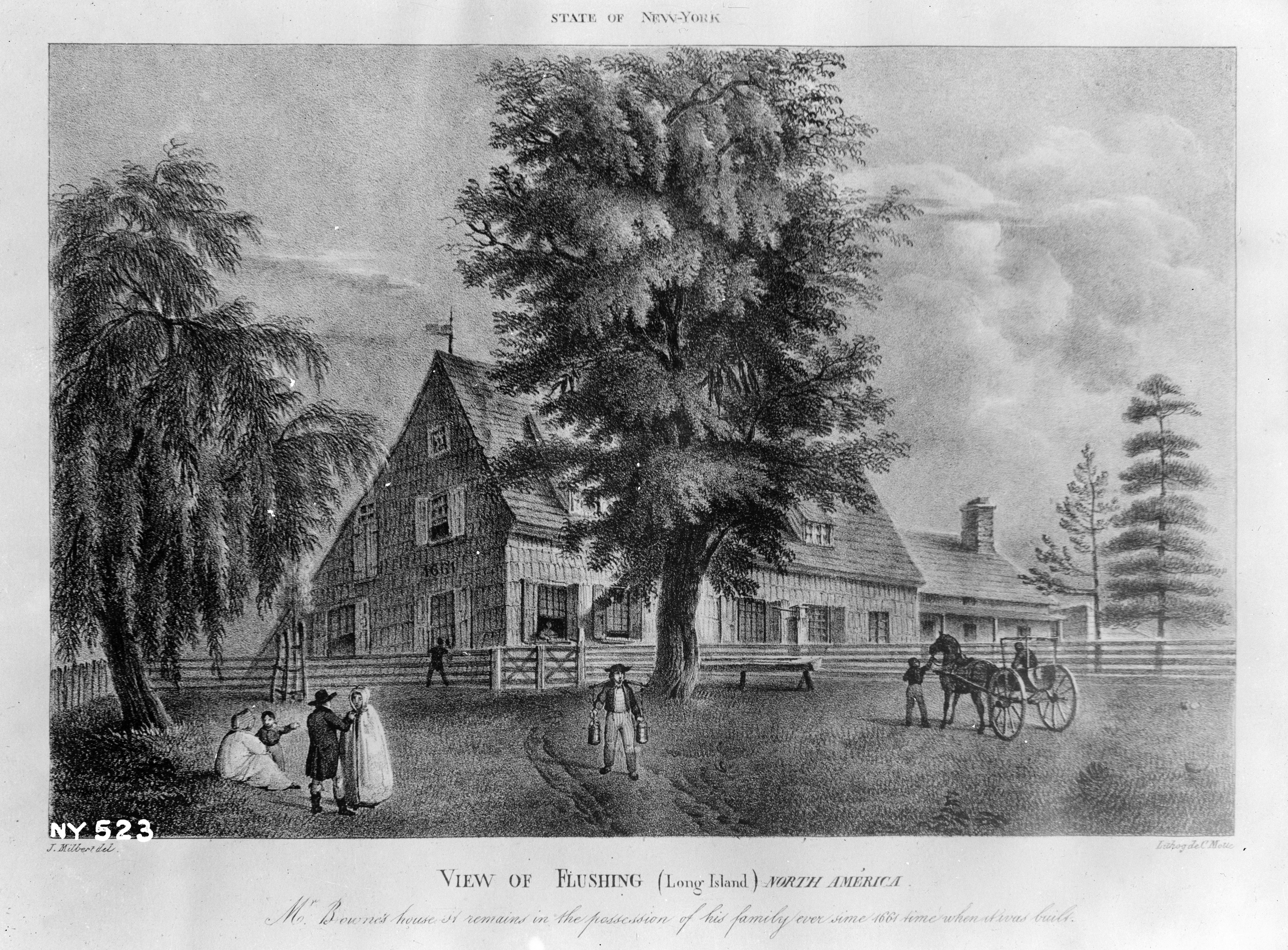
View of Flushing, John Bowne House, 1825

On October 10, 1645, Flushing was established on the eastern bank of Flushing Creek under charter of the Dutch West India Company and was part of the New Netherland colony that was governed from New Amsterdam (Lower Manhattan). The settlement was named Vlissingen, after the city of Vlissingen, which was the European base of the Dutch West India company. By 1657, the residents called the place "Vlishing". Eventually, the formal traditional English name for the Dutch town, "Flushing", would be settled upon (despite being a Dutch colony, many of the local early settlers were British, who trickled down from nearby Connecticut Colony).

Unlike all other towns in the region, the charter of Flushing allowed residents freedom of religion as practiced in Holland "without the disturbance of any magistrate or ecclesiastical minister". However, in 1656, New Amsterdam Director-General Peter Stuyvesant issued an edict prohibiting the harboring of Quakers.

In response, on December 27, 1657, the inhabitants of Flushing approved a protest known as The Flushing Remonstrance. This petition contained religious arguments, even mentioning freedom for "Jews, Turks, and Egyptians," and ended with a forceful declaration that any infringement of the town charter would not be tolerated. Subsequently, a farmer named John Bowne held Quaker meetings in his home and was arrested for this and deported to Holland. Eventually he persuaded the Dutch West India Company to allow Quakers and others to worship freely. As such, Flushing is claimed to be a birthplace of religious freedom in the New World.

Landmarks remaining from the Dutch period in Flushing include the John Bowne House (c. 1661) on Bowne Street and the Old Quaker Meeting House (1694) on Northern Boulevard. The Remonstrance was signed at a house on the site of the former State Armory, now a police facility, on the south side Northern Boulevard between Linden Place and Union Street.

=== English colony ===
In 1664, the English took control of New Amsterdam, ending Dutch control of the New Netherland colony, and renamed it the Province of New York. When Queens County was established in 1683, the "Town of Flushing" was one of the original five towns which comprised the county. Many historical references to Flushing are to this town, bounded from Newtown on the west by Flushing Creek (now Flushing River), from Jamaica on the south by the watershed, and from Hempstead on the east by what later became the Nassau County line. The town was dissolved in 1898 when Queens became a borough of New York City, and the term "Flushing" today usually refers to a much smaller area, for example the former Village of Flushing.

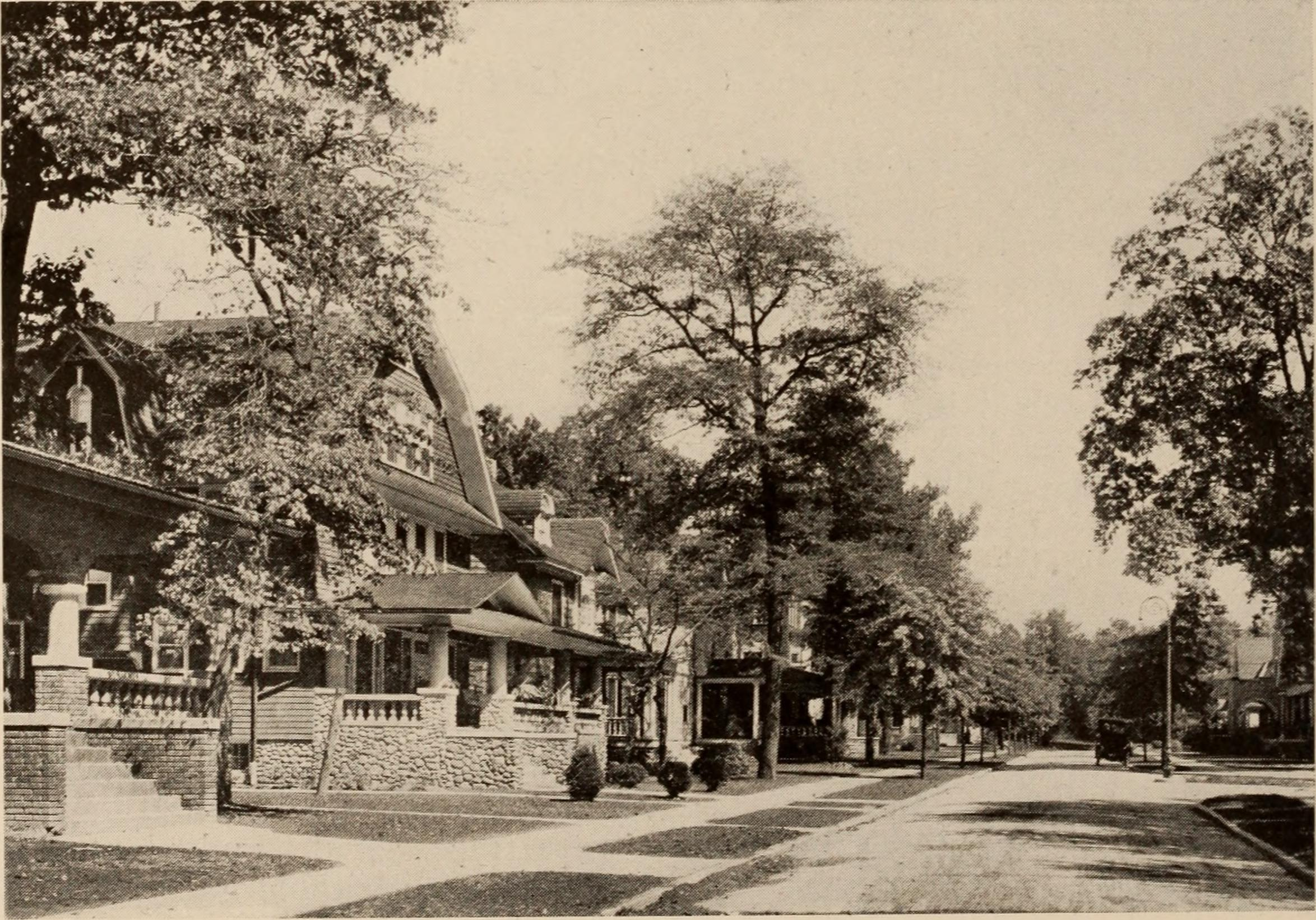
Ash Street, now called Ash Avenue, in the early 20th century

Flushing was a seat of power as the Province of New York up to the American Revolution was led by Governor Cadwallader Colden, based at his Spring Hill estate.

Flushing was the site of the first commercial tree nurseries in North America, the most prominent being the Prince, Bloodgood, and Parsons nurseries. A 14-acre (5.7 ha) tract of Parsons's exotic specimens was preserved on the north side of Kissena Park. The nurseries are also commemorated in the names of west–east avenues that intersect Kissena Boulevard; the streets are named after plants and ordered alphabetically from Ash Avenue in the north to Rose Avenue in the south. Flushing also supplied trees to the Greensward Project, now known as Central Park in Manhattan. Well into the 20th century, Flushing contained many horticultural establishments and greenhouses.

During the American Revolution, Flushing, along with most settlements in present-day Queens County, favored the British and quartered British troops, though one battalion of Scottish Highlanders is known to have been stationed at Flushing during the war. Following the Battle of Long Island, Zackary Perrine, an officer in the Continental Army, was apprehended near Flushing Bay while on what was probably an intelligence gathering mission and was later hanged.

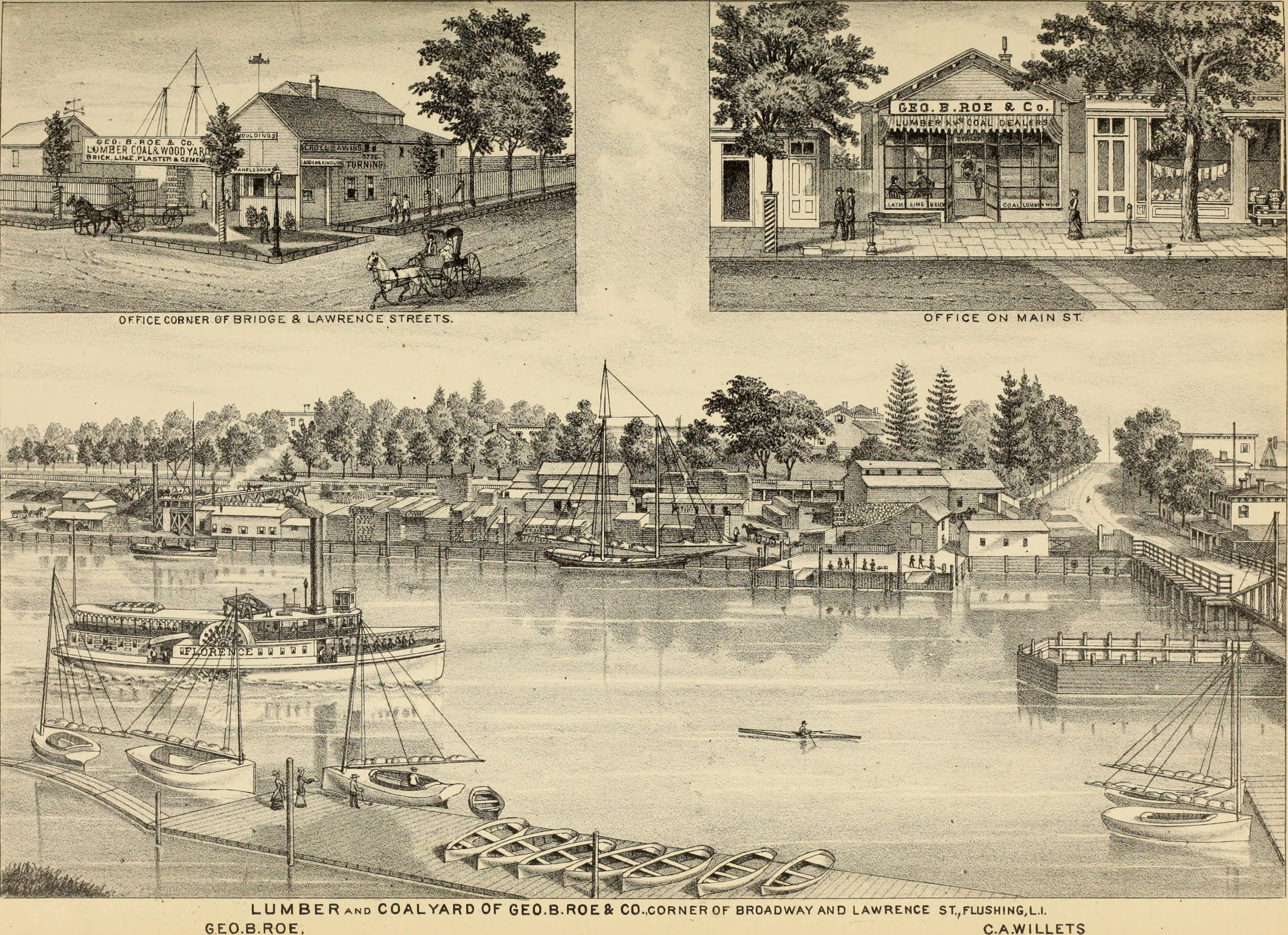
Flushing in 1882

The 1785 Kingsland Homestead, originally the residence of a wealthy Quaker merchant, now serves as the home of the Queens Historical Society.

=== 19th century ===
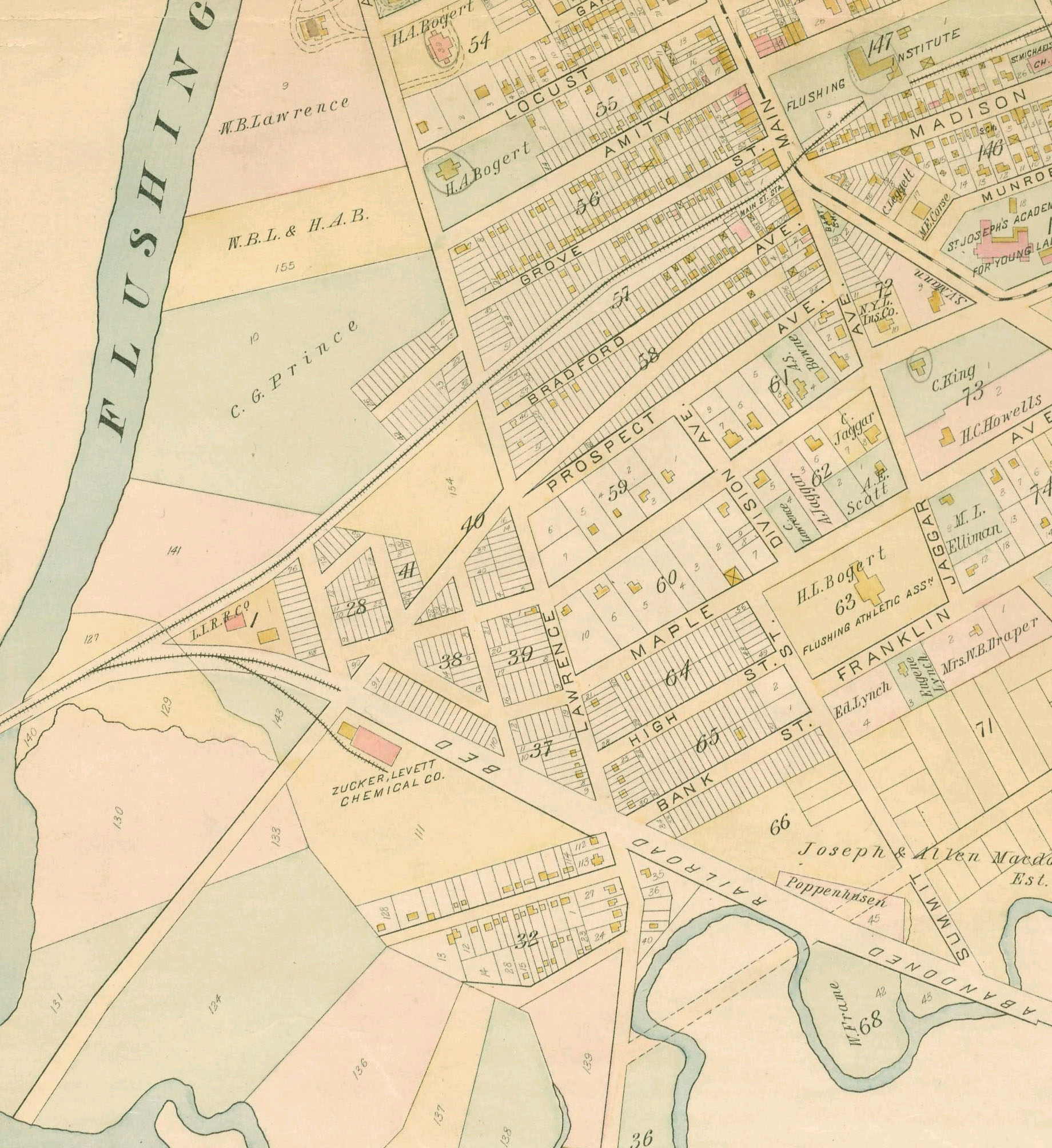
Map of Flushing in 1891

During the 19th century, as New York City continued to grow in population and economic vitality, so did Flushing. Its proximity to Manhattan was critical in its transformation into a fashionable residential area. On April 15, 1837, the Village of Flushing was incorporated within the Town of Flushing. The official seal was merely the words, "Village of Flushing", surrounded by nondescript flowers. No other emblem or flag is known to have been used. The Village of Flushing included the neighbourhoods of Flushing Highlands, Bowne Park, Murray Hill, Ingleside, and Flushing Park.

The Flushing and North Side Railroad opened its Port Washington Branch to Flushing in 1854, providing access to Hunters Point on the East River shore. By the mid-1860s, Queens County had 30,429 residents. The Village of College Point was incorporated in 1867, and the Village of Whitestone was incorporated in 1868. The first free public high school in what is now New York City was established in Flushing in 1875. Flushing, then a small village, established a library in 1858, the oldest in Queens County and only slightly younger than the library of the City of Brooklyn (built in 1852).

In 1898, although opposed to the proposal, the Town of Flushing (along with two other towns and other land of Queens County) was consolidated into the City of New York to form the new Borough of Queens. All towns, villages, and cities within the new borough were dissolved.

Local farmland continued to be subdivided and developed transforming Flushing into a densely populated neighborhood of New York City. A major factor in this was the Halleran real estate agency. From the American Civil War to the end of the 1930s its slogan "Ask Mr. Halleran!" could be seen in ads all over Long Island, and the phrase from its maps "So This Is Flushing" became a catchphrase.

=== Early 20th century development ===
The continued construction of bridges over the Flushing River and the development of other roads increased the volume of vehicular traffic into Flushing. In 1909, the Queensboro Bridge over the East River opened, connecting Queens County to midtown Manhattan. With the opening of Pennsylvania Station the next year, the Port Washington Branch, now part of the Long Island Rail Road, started running to midtown Manhattan. Broadway, a main roadway through Flushing, was widened and renamed Northern Boulevard. The Roosevelt Avenue Bridge over the Flushing River, which carries four lanes of traffic and the New York City Subway's elevated Flushing Line (7 and <7> trains), was the largest trunnion bascule bridge in the world when it was completed in 1927. The next year, the Main Street terminal of the Flushing subway line opened in downtown Flushing, giving the neighborhood direct subway access.

Flushing was a forerunner of Hollywood, when the young American film industry was still based on the U.S. East Coast and Chicago. Decades later, the RKO Keith's movie palace would host vaudeville acts and appearances by the likes of Mickey Rooney, the Marx Brothers and Bob Hope.

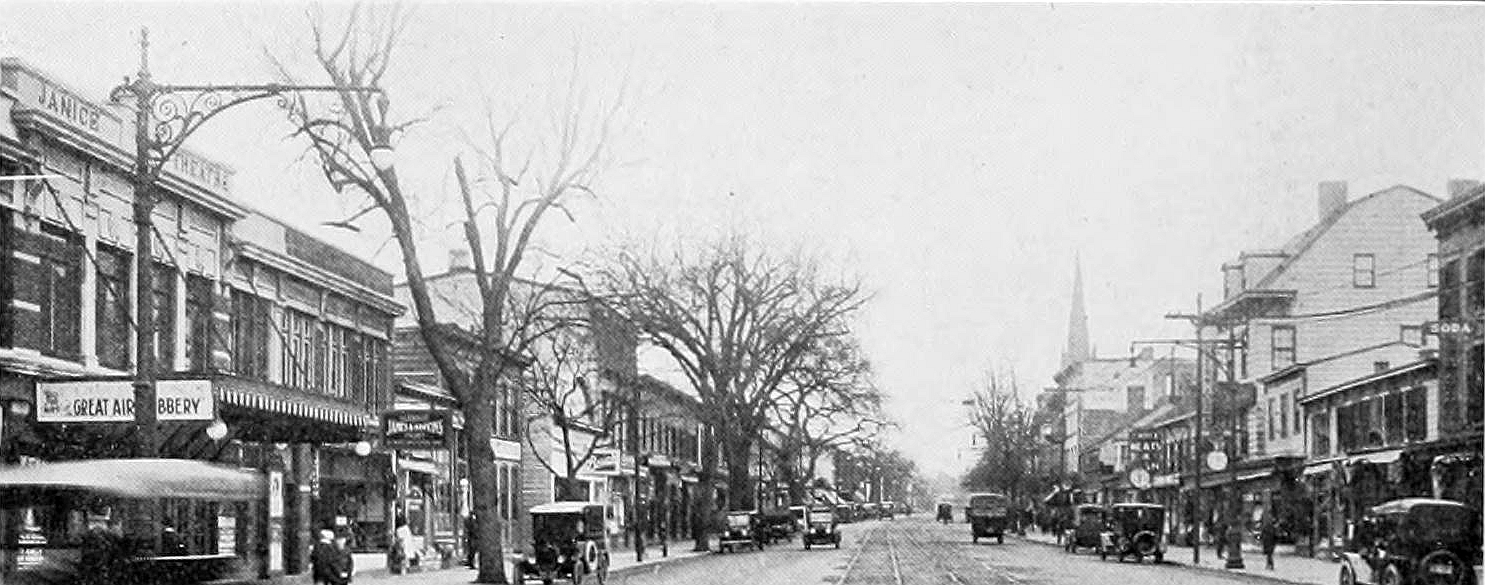
Main Street, 1920

=== Asian immigration ===
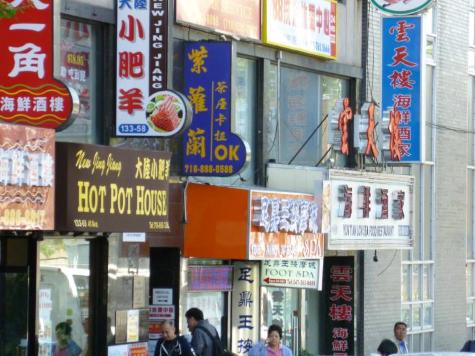
Flushing Chinatown

In the 1970s, immigrants from Taiwan established a foothold in Flushing, whose demographic constituency had been predominantly non-Hispanic white, interspersed with a small Japanese community. Additionally, a large South Korean population also called Flushing home. The Taiwanese immigrants were the first wave of Chinese-speaking immigrants who spoke Mandarin (Taiwanese also spoken) rather than Cantonese to arrive in New York City. Many Taiwanese immigrants were additionally Hokkien and had relatives or connections to Fujian province in China, which led to large influxes of Fuzhounese Americans.

Over the years, many recent non-Cantonese ethnic Chinese immigrants from different regions and provinces of China have settled in Flushing having heard of it through word of mouth. This wave of immigrants spoke Mandarin and various regional/provincial dialects. The early 1990s and 2000s brought a wave of Fuzhounese Americans and Wenzhounese immigrants, who mostly spoke Mandarin, and who settled in Flushing as well as Elmhurst. Flushing's Chinese population became diverse over the next few decades as people from different provinces started to arrive. Due to loosened emigration restrictions in mainland China, there has been a growing Northern Chinese population in Flushing. The regional food cuisines have led to Flushing being considered the "food mecca" for Chinese regional cuisine outside of Asia.

=== 21st century transformation ===
In the 21st century, Flushing has cemented its status as an international "melting pot", predominantly attracting immigrants from Asia, particularly from throughout the various provinces of China, but including newcomers from all over the world. Flushing Chinatown is centered around Main Street and the area to its west, most prominently along Roosevelt Avenue, which have become the primary nexus of Flushing Chinatown. However, Chinatown continues to expand southeastward along Kissena Boulevard and northward beyond Northern Boulevard. The Flushing Chinatown houses over 30,000 individuals born in China alone, the largest Chinatown by this metric outside Asia and one of the largest and fastest-growing Chinatowns in the world. In January 2019, the New York Post named Flushing as New York City's "most dynamic outer-borough neighborhood". Flushing is undergoing rapid gentrification by Chinese transnational entities.

==== Streetscape ====
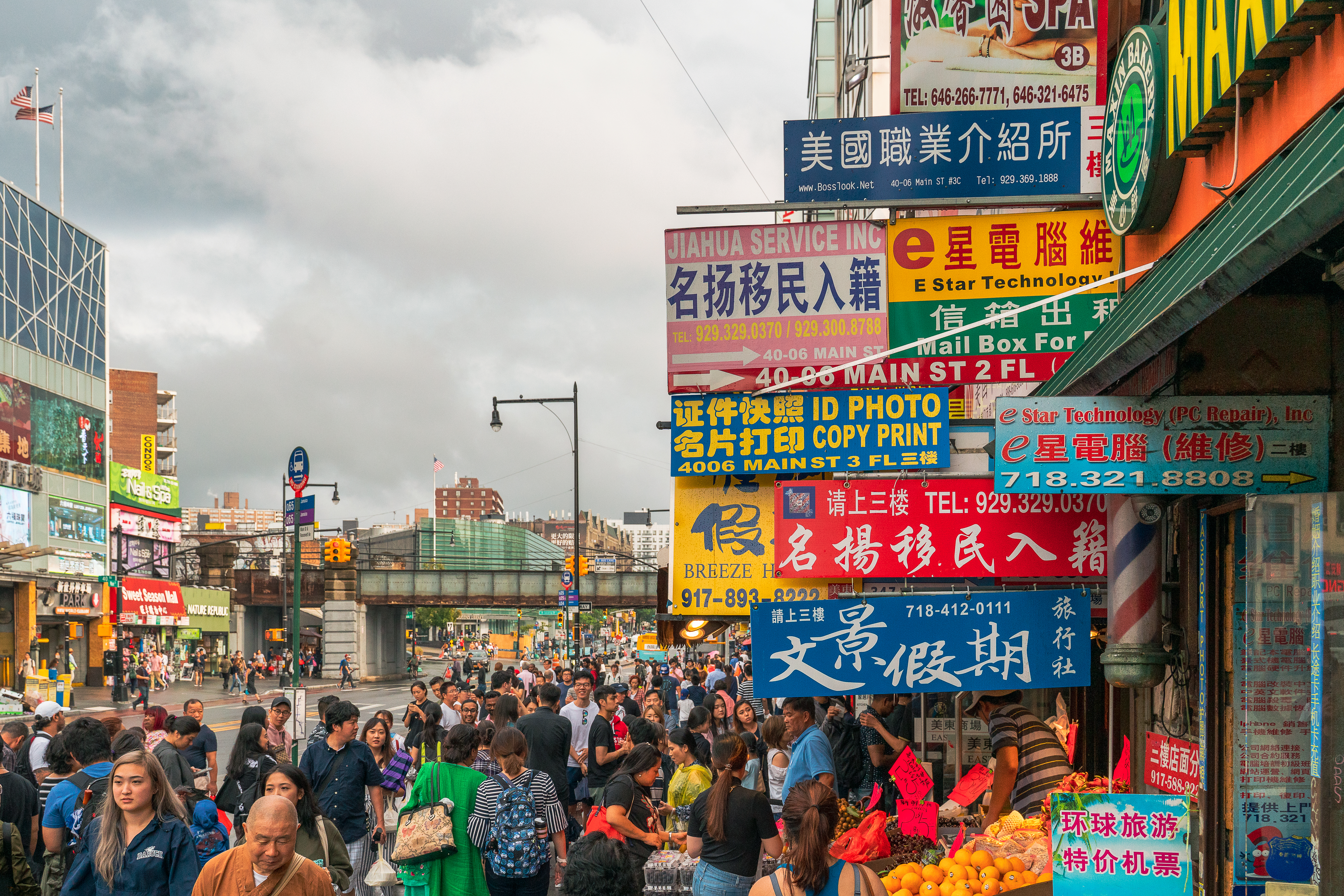
The busy intersection of Main Street and Roosevelt Avenue in the Flushing Chinatown (法拉盛華埠), Downtown Flushing, the third-busiest pedestrian intersection in New York City. The segment of Main Street between Kissena Boulevard and Roosevelt Avenue, punctuated by the Long Island Rail Road Port Washington Branch overpass, represents the cultural heart of Flushing Chinatown. Housing over 30,000 individuals born in China alone, the largest by this metric outside Asia, Flushing has become home to the largest and one of the fastest-growing Chinatowns in the world, known as the "Chinese Times Square" or the "Chinese Manhattan".

== Demographics ==
Based on data from the 2010 United States census, the population of Flushing was 72,008, an increase of 2,646 (3.8%) from the 69,362 counted in 2000. Covering an area of 853.06 acres (345.22 ha), the neighborhood had a population density of 84.4 inhabitants per acre (54,000/sq mi; 20,900/km^{2}).

The racial makeup of the neighborhood was 69.2% (49,830) Asian, 9.5% (6,831) white, 4.2% (3,016) black, 0.1% (74) Native American, 0.1% (59) Pacific Islander, 0.2% (172) from other races, and 1.8% (1,303) from two or more races. Hispanic or Latino of any race were 14.9% (10,723) of the population.

The entirety of Community Board 7, which comprises Flushing, College Point, and Whitestone, had 263,039 inhabitants as of NYC Health's 2018 Community Health Profile, with an average life expectancy of 84.3 years. This is longer than the median life expectancy of 81.2 for all New York City neighborhoods. Most inhabitants are middle-aged and elderly: 22% are between the ages of between 25 and 44, 30% between 45 and 64, and 18% over 65. The ratio of youth and college-aged residents was lower, at 17% and 7%, respectively.

As of 2017, the median household income in Community Board 7 was $51,284. In 2018, an estimated 25% of Flushing and Whitestone residents lived in poverty, compared to 19% in all of Queens and 20% in all of New York City. One in seventeen residents (6%) were unemployed, compared to 8% in Queens and 9% in New York City. Rent burden, or the percentage of residents who have difficulty paying their rent, is 57% in Flushing and Whitestone, higher than the boroughwide and citywide rates of 53% and 51% respectively. Based on this calculation, as of 2018, Flushing and Whitestone are considered to be high-income relative to the rest of the city and not gentrifying.

== Cultural enclaves ==
=== Diverse Chinese communities ===
Chinatown, Flushing
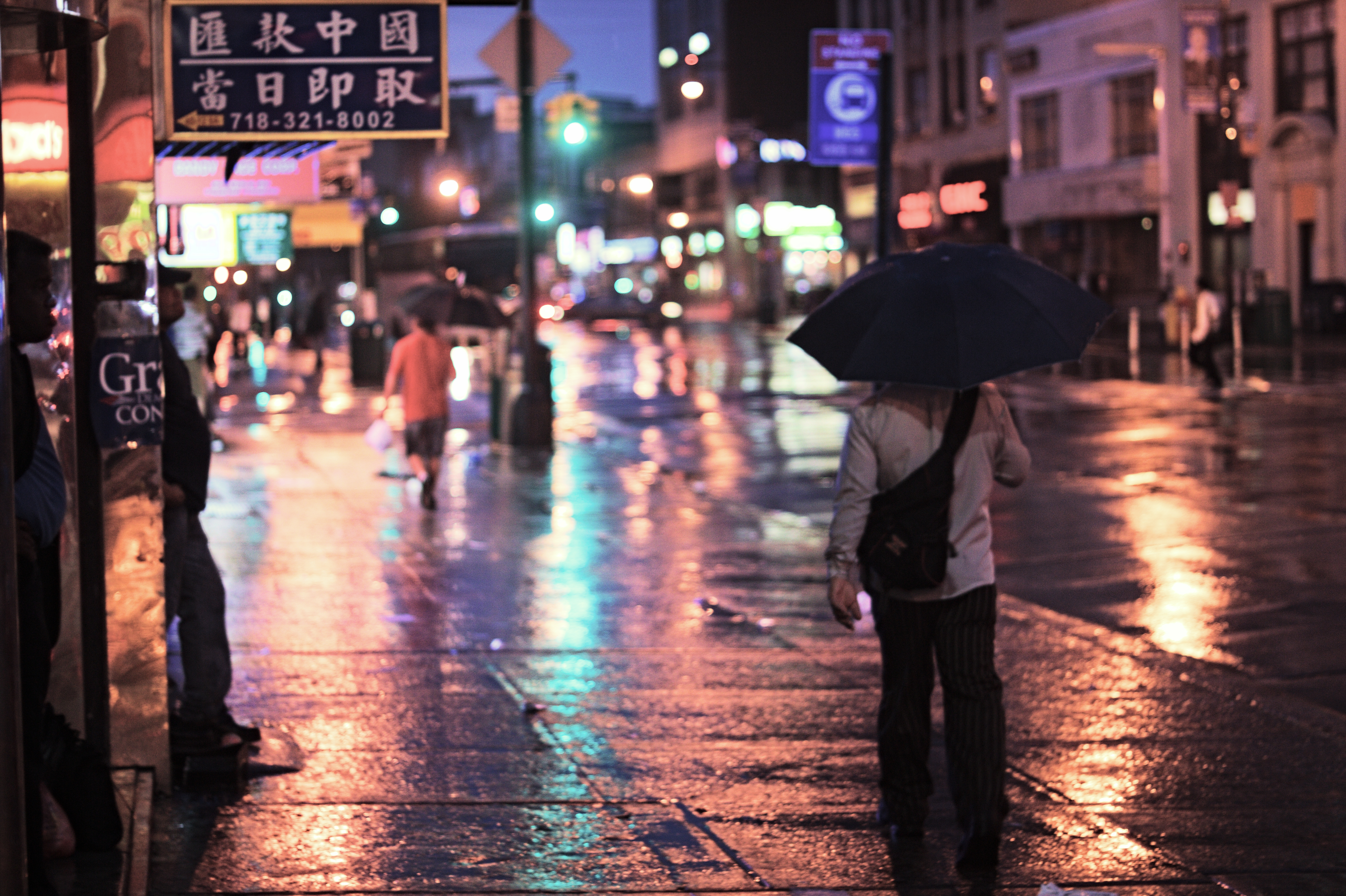
- The intersection of Main Street and Roosevelt Avenue
- Traditional Chinese: 法拉盛華埠
- Simplified Chinese: 法拉盛华埠
Transcriptions
Standard Mandarin
- Hanyu Pinyin: Fǎlāshèng Huá Bù
- Gwoyeu Romatzyh: Faalashenq Hwabuh
- Wade–Giles: Fa^{3}la^{1}sheng^{4} Hua^{2} Pu^{4}
- Tongyong Pinyin: Fǎlāshèng Húa Bú
- IPA: [fàláʂə̂ŋ xwǎ pʰû]
Yue: Cantonese
- Jyutping: Faat3laa1sing4 Waa4 Bou6
- IPA: [fāːtláːsȉŋ wȁːpòu]
Southern Min
- Hokkien POJ: Niú-iok Hôa-bú

Flushing Chinatown, or Mandarin Town is the world's largest and one of the fastest-growing Chinatowns, known as the "Chinese Times Square" or the "Chinese Manhattan". In Mandarin, Flushing is known as "Falasheng" (Chinese: 法拉盛; pinyin: Fǎlāshèng). The Chinatown of Flushing is centered around the intersection of Main Street and Roosevelt Avenue, and many of the area's Chinese businesses are located on the blocks around, or west of, Main Street. However, Chinatown continues to expand southeastward along Kissena Boulevard and northward beyond Northern Boulevard.

In the 1970s, a Chinese community established a foothold in the neighborhood of Flushing, whose demographic constituency had been predominantly non-Hispanic white. Taiwanese began the surge of immigration, followed by other groups of Chinese. A 1986 estimate by the Flushing Chinese Business Association approximated 60,000 Chinese in Flushing alone. By 1990, Asians constituted 41% of the population of the core area of Flushing, with Chinese in turn representing 41% of the Asian population. However, ethnic Chinese are constituting an increasingly dominant proportion of the Asian population as well as of the overall population in Flushing and its Chinatown. High rates of both legal and illegal immigration from Mainland China continue to spur the ongoing rise of the ethnic Chinese population in Flushing. According to a Daily News article in 2011, Flushing's Chinatown ranked as New York City's second largest Chinese community with 33,526 Chinese, surpassed only by the Brooklyn Chinatown (布鲁克林華埠), and larger than Manhattan's Chinatown. The growth of the business activity at the core of Downtown Flushing, dominated by the Flushing Chinatown, has continued to flourish despite the Covid-19 pandemic.

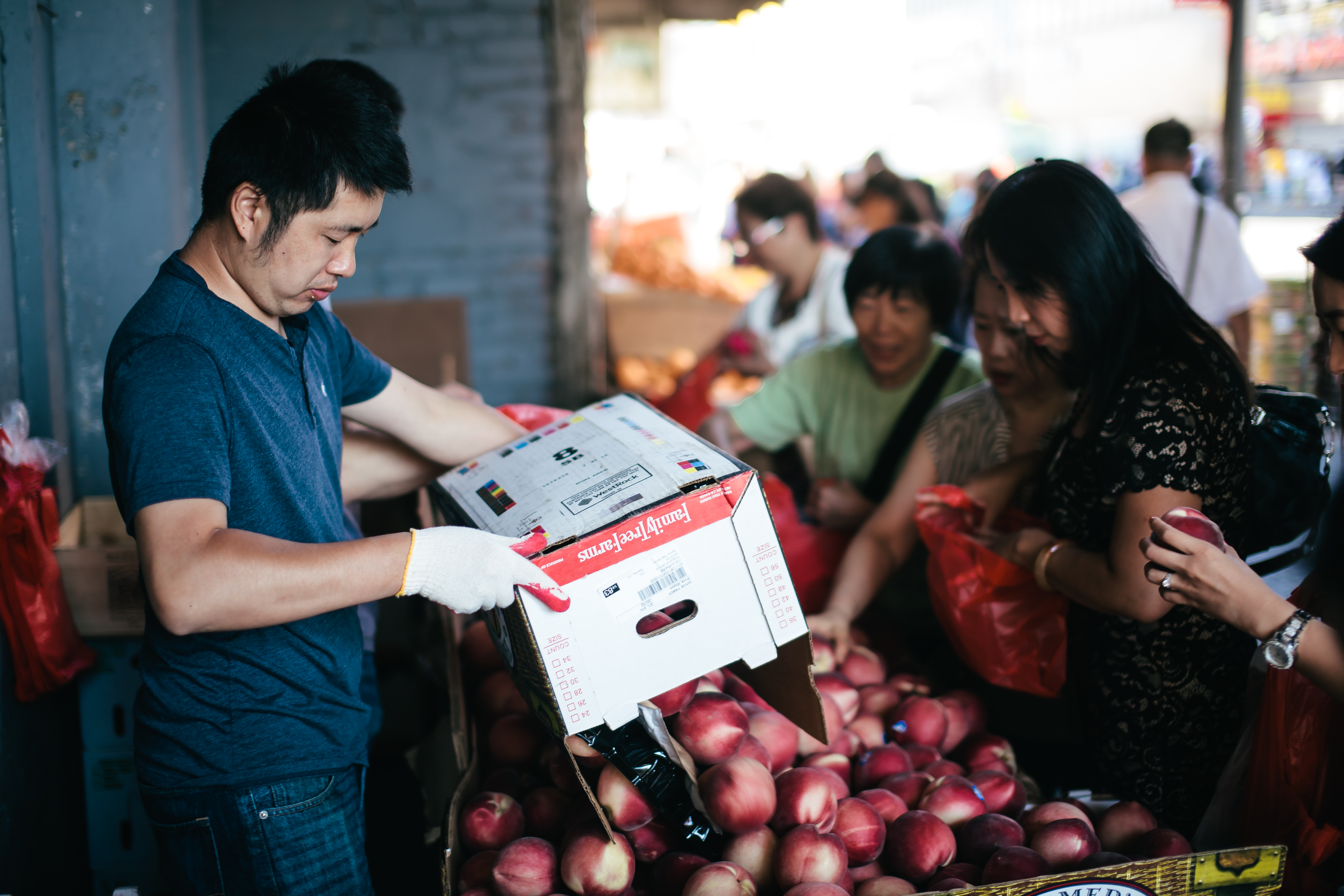
Street vendor selling fruit under the Flushing–Main Street LIRR station

Flushing now rivals Manhattan's Chinatown as a center of Chinese culture. The Lunar New Year Parade has become a growing annual celebration of Chinese New Year. In addition, several Chinese supermarkets such as Hong Kong Supermarket and New York Supermarket have locations in Flushing. The World Journal, one of the largest Chinese-language newspapers outside China, is headquartered in adjacent Whitestone. Numerous other Chinese- and English-language publications are available in Flushing, including SinoVision, one of North America's largest Chinese language television networks.

Many styles of Chinese cuisine are accessible in Flushing, including Hakka, Taiwanese, Shanghainese, Hunanese, Sichuanese, Cantonese, Fujianese, Xinjiang, Zhejiang, and Korean Chinese cuisine. Even obscure styles of cuisine indigenous to Northeast China, such as Dongbei, is available in Flushing, as well as Mongolian cuisine and Uyghur cuisine. Varieties of Chinese spoken in Flushing include Mandarin Chinese, Fuzhou dialect, Min Nan (Hokkien), Wu Chinese (Wenzhounese, Shanghainese, Suzhou dialect, Hangzhou dialect), and Cantonese. Additionally, the Mongolian language is emerging in the neighborhood. Due to its rapid growth, the Flushing Chinatown has surpassed the original New York City Chinatown in the borough of Manhattan in size and population.

In accompaniment with its rapid growth, Flushing in particular has witnessed the proliferation of highly competitive businesses touted as educational centers as well as non-profit organizations declaring the intent to educate the community. Some entities offer education in Mandarin, the most spoken Chinese variety in mainland China. A diverse array of social services geared toward assisting recent as well as established Chinese immigrants is readily available in Flushing. As of the 2020s, about 3/4 of the Asian population in the area are of Chinese descent making them the majority of the Asian population.

=== Korean community ===
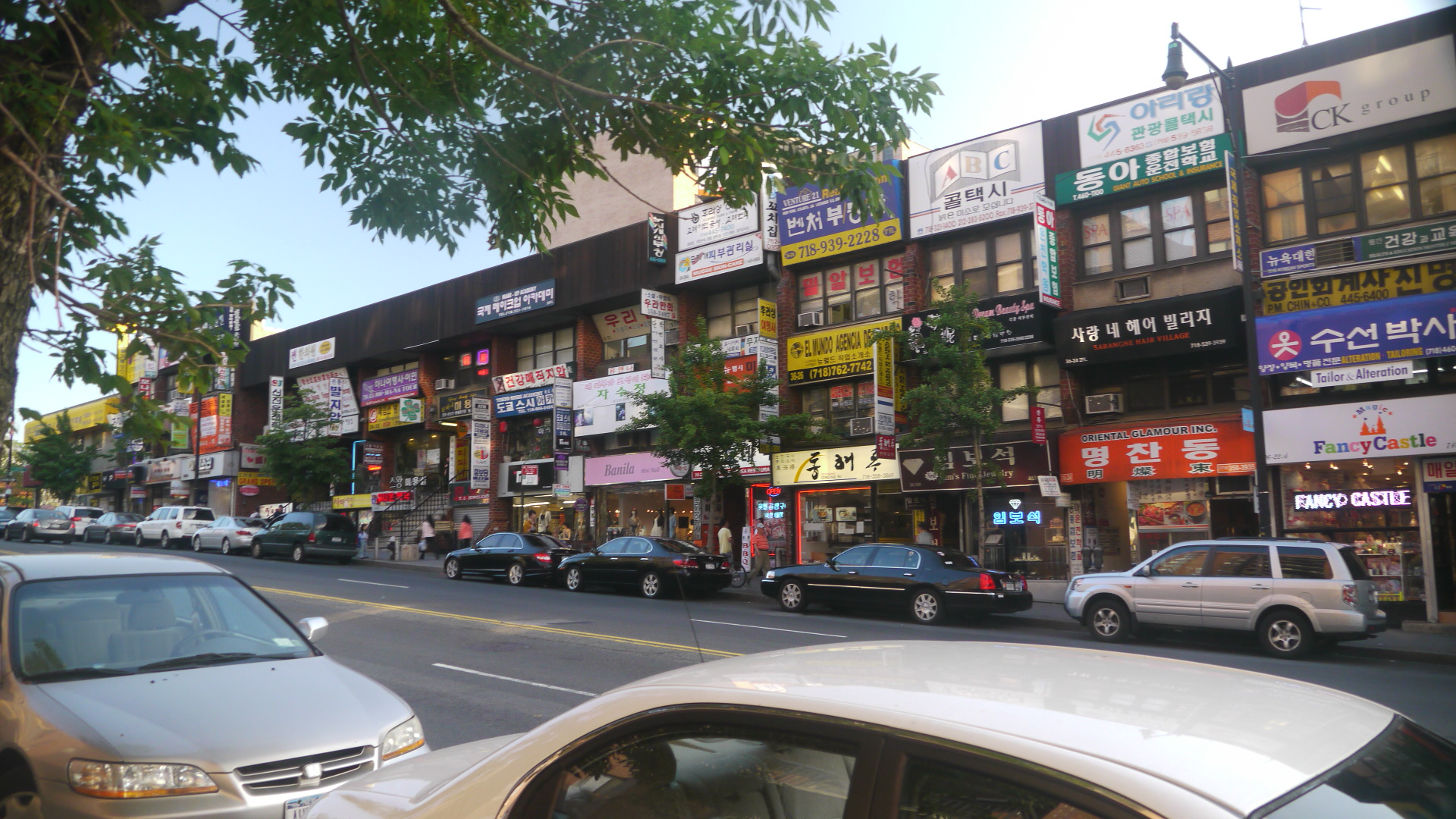
Koreatown

There is a Koreatown that originated in Flushing, but has since spread eastward to Murray Hill, Bayside, Douglaston, and Little Neck in Queens, and also into Nassau County. The Koreatown has historically been centered around Union Street, with the later growth being concentrated around Northern Boulevard east of Union Street. As of the 2010 United States census, the Korean population of Queens was 64,107.

In the 1980s, a continuous stream of Korean immigrants emerged into Flushing, many of whom began as workers in the medical field or Korean international students who had moved to New York City to find or initiate professional or entrepreneurial positions. They established a foothold on Union Street in Flushing between 35th and 41st Avenues, featuring restaurants and karaoke (noraebang) bars, grocery markets, education centers and bookstores, banking institutions, offices, consumer electronics vendors, apparel boutiques, and other commercial enterprises. As the community grew in wealth and population and rose in socioeconomic status, Koreans expanded their presence eastward along Northern Boulevard, buying homes in more affluent and less dense neighborhoods in Queens and Nassau County. This expansion has led to the creation of an American Meokjagolmok, or Korean Restaurant Street, around the Murray Hill station. The eastward pressure to expand was also created by the inability to move westward due to the Flushing Chinatown on Main Street. Per the 2010 United States census, the Korean population of Queens was 64,107, representing the largest municipality in the United States with a density of at least 500 Korean Americans per square mile. The Korean American population, consisting of 218,764 individuals in the New York metropolitan area, is the second largest population of ethnic Koreans outside Korea.

The Korea Times, a news organization based in Seoul, carries a significant presence in the Long Island Koreatown. The Long Island Koreatown features numerous restaurants that serve both traditional and/or regional Korean cuisine. Korean is spoken frequently alongside English and Chinese varieties, and retail signs employing the Hangul alphabet are ubiquitous. A significant array of social services toward assisting recent and established Korean immigrants is available in Koreatown. There is also a significant population of Korean-Chinese or Chinese-Koreans in Flushing who can speak Mandarin, Korean, and English.

=== Other ethnic communities ===
The neighborhood of East Flushing, technically within Greater Flushing, also houses a substantial Chinese community along with most of Downtown Flushing. However, East Flushing also substantially includes Irish, Greek, Russian, Italian, Jewish, Spanish, and Portuguese communities, as well as communities of Indians, Sri Lankans, Japanese, Malaysians, and Hispanics, mostly Colombians and Salvadorans. This neighborhood tends to be more diverse visibly than Downtown Flushing because of the more even distribution of the ethnicities of East Flushing residents resulting in more ethnic businesses catering to each community rather than the dominance of Chinese and to a lesser extent Korean businesses in Downtown Flushing.

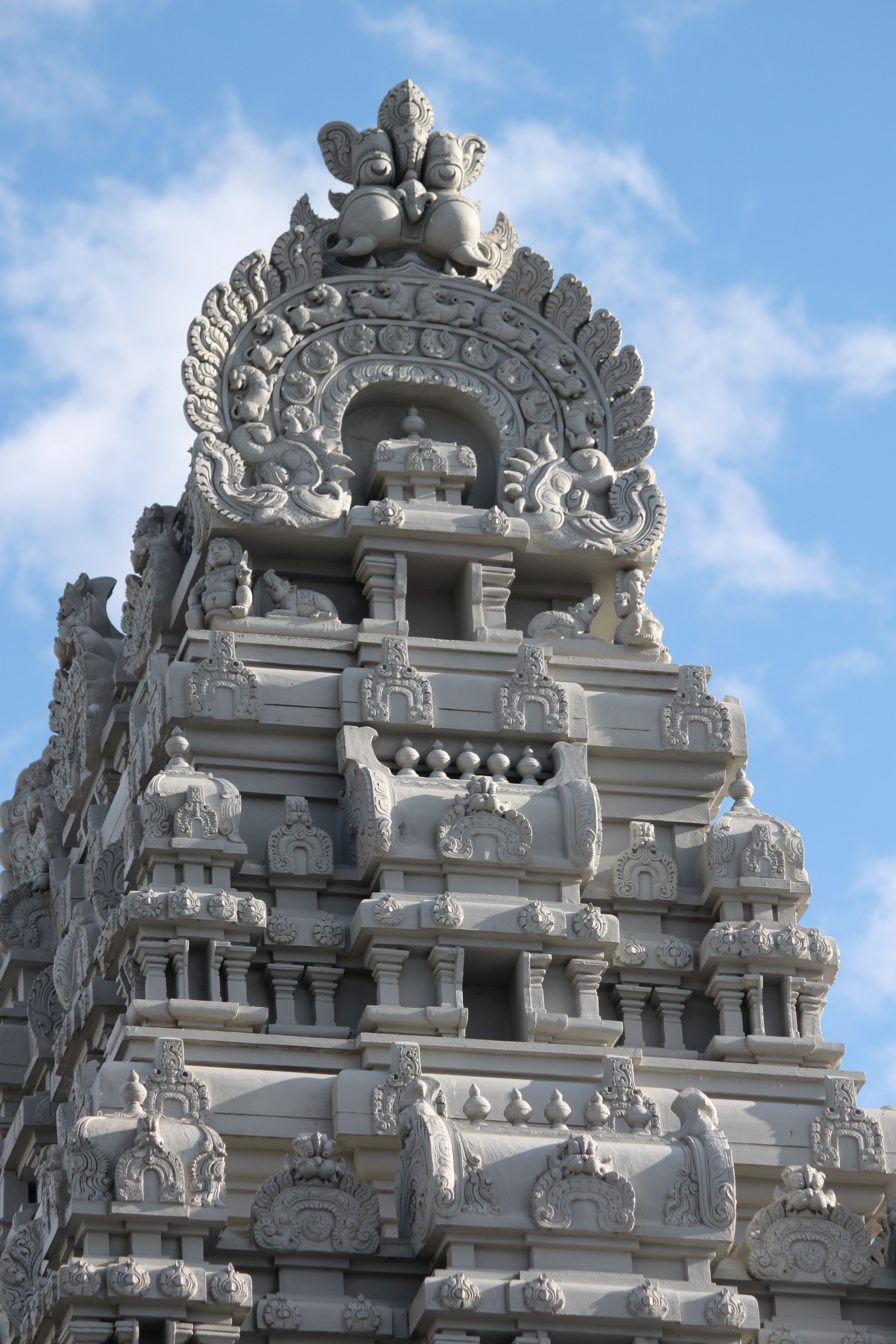
Sri Maha Vallabha Ganapati Devasthanam Hindu Temple

The northeastern section of Flushing near Bayside continues to maintain large Italian and Greek presences that are reflected in its many Italian and Greek bakeries, grocery stores and restaurants. The northwest is a mix of Jews, Greeks, and Italians. Most of central Flushing is an ethnic mix of Whites, Hispanic Americans, and Asian Americans.

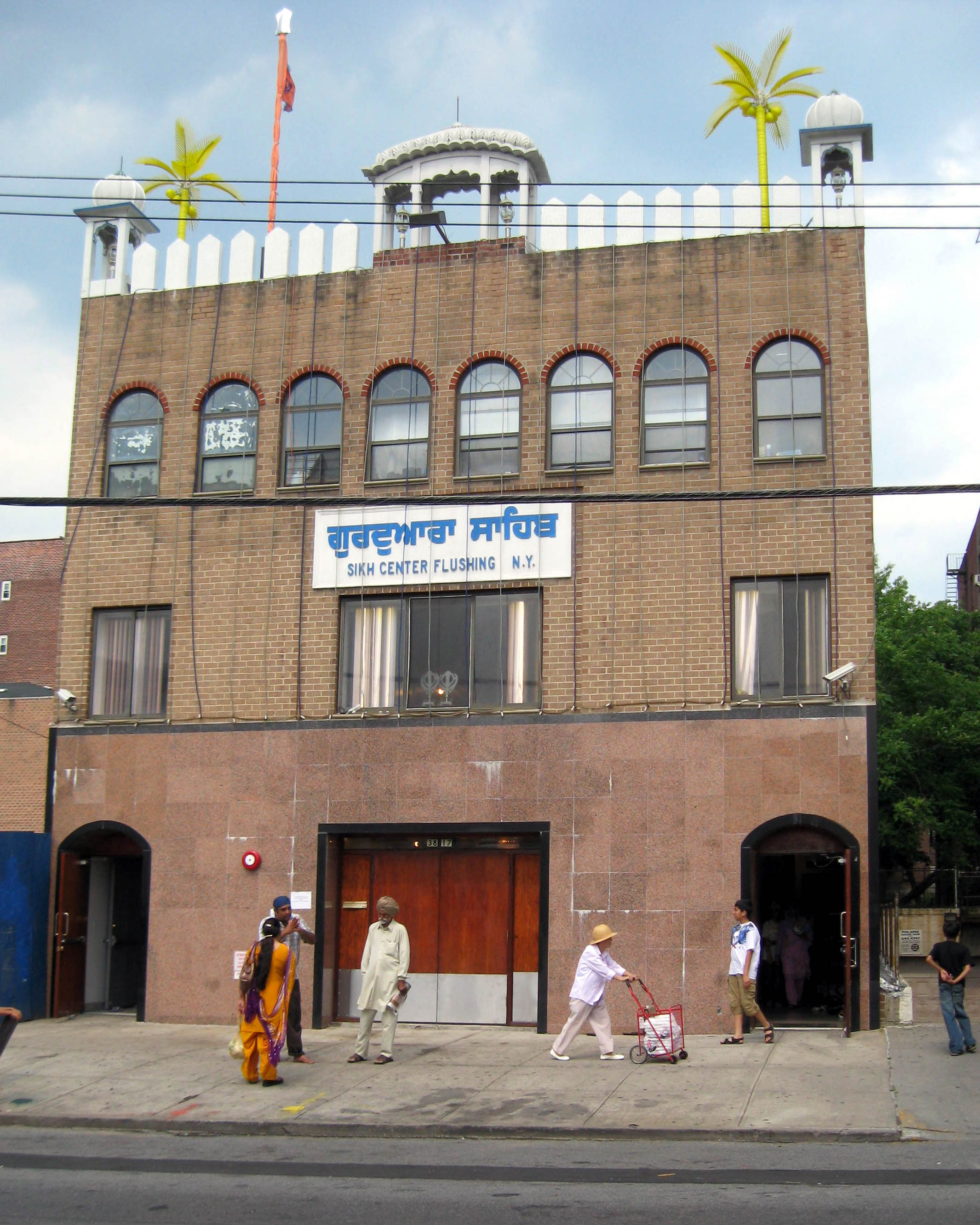
Sikh Center in Flushing

An area south of Franklin Avenue houses a concentration of Indian, Pakistani, Afghan, and Bangladeshi markets. This concentration of Indian American and other South Asian American businesses south of Franklin Avenue has existed since the late 1970s, one of the oldest Little India neighborhoods in North America. The Sri Maha Vallabha Ganapati Devasthanam (Sanskrit: श्री महावल्लभ गणपति देवस्थानम्, Tamil: ஸ்ரீ மகா வல்லப கணபதி தேவஸ்தானம்) at 45–57 Bowne Street in Flushing was the very first of the traditional Hindu temple organized in North America. However, Indians are migrating eastward into neighborhoods in northeastern Queens and into Nassau County, as with many Chinese and Korean immigrants.

== Subsections ==
=== Broadway–Flushing ===
Broadway–Flushing, also known as North Flushing, is a residential area with many large homes. The name refers to the area served by the "Broadway" station of the Long Island Rail Road. The Broadway station is located immediately east of the location where the LIRR's Port Washington Branch crosses Northern Boulevard, which when the station was opened in 1866 was called "Broadway". Part of this area has been designated a State and Federal historic district due to the elegant, park-like character of the neighborhood. Much of the area has been rezoned by the City of New York to preserve the low density, residential quality of the neighborhood. Broadway-Flushing is approximately bounded by 29th Avenue to the north, Northern Boulevard and Crocheron Avenue to the south, 155th Street to the west, and 172nd Streets to the east.

=== Linden Hill ===
Linden Hill is bound by 25th Avenue to Willets Point Boulevard to the north, 154th Street to the east, Northern Boulevard to the south and the Whitestone Expressway to the west.

Linden Hill was originally a rural estate owned by the Mitchell family. Ernest Mitchell owned an adjacent area to the west known as Breezy Hill and his father owned the area now called Linden Hill. The two areas are sometimes referred to as the Mitchell-Linden neighborhood. A major change in the rural nature of Linden Hill occurred in the early 1950s. Neisloss Brothers with architect Benjamin Braunstein envisioned a cooperative project to be set on Linden Hill and landfill on the adjacent swamp to the west which would provide middle-income housing to veterans of World War II and the Korean War. The construction was carried out under Section 213 of the Federal Housing Act of 1950 which provided mortgage insurance for non-subsidized projects. Gerace and Castagna with architects Samuel Paul and Seymour Jarmul subsequently developed the larger Linden Towers several years after this. Paul was additionally the architect of Embassy Arms. In total, 41 six-story buildings containing 3,146 apartments comprising the Linden Hill, Mitchell Gardens, Linden Towers, and Embassy Arms cooperatives were erected.

Once a primarily European-American, largely Jewish, neighborhood, Linden Hill is now predominantly Chinese-American.

=== Murray Hill ===
Map of Murray Hill (including Broadway–Flushing)

Murray Hill is bounded by 150th Street to the west and 160th Street to the east and straddles ZIP Codes 11354, 11355, and 11358. Traditionally the home of families of Irish and Italian immigrants, many Korean and Chinese immigrants have moved into Murray Hill in recent years. Murray Hill within Flushing is often confused with the larger Murray Hill neighborhood on the East Side of Manhattan. The Long Island Rail Road's Murray Hill and Broadway stations serve the area.

Before the area was developed for residential housing in 1889, Murray Hill was the location of several large nurseries owned by the King, Murray, and Parsons families. The Kingsland Homestead has been preserved as the home of the Queens Historical Society. The Voelker Orth Museum, Bird Sanctuary and Victorian Garden is also located in Murray Hill. Comic strip artist Richard F. Outcault, the creator of The Yellow Kid and Buster Brown, lived on 147th Street in Murray Hill.

=== Pomonok ===
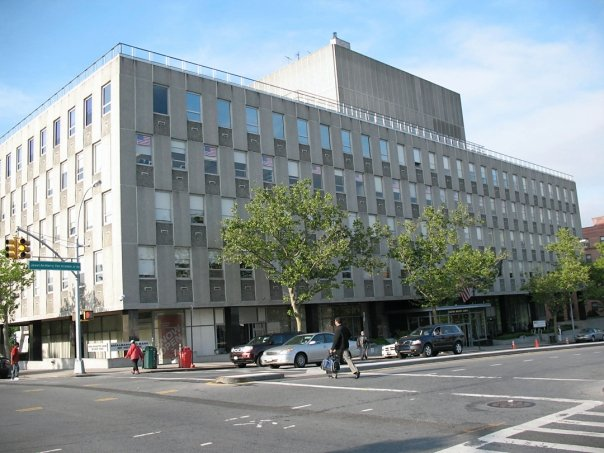
Electchester Union Building – Local 3

Pomonok is a neighborhood in South Flushing. This large public housing development was built in 1949 on the former site of Pomonok Country Club. The name comes from an Algonquian word for eastern Long Island, and means either "land of tribute" or "land where there is travelling by water". In Pomonok, there is also Electchester, a cooperative housing complex at Jewel Avenue and Parsons Boulevard in Pomonok, which was established by Harry Van Arsdale Jr. and Local 3 of the International Brotherhood of Electrical Workers in 1949, when Van Arsdale worked with the Joint Industry Board of the Electrical Industry to purchase 103 acres (0.42 km^{2}) of the former Pomonok Country Club and build apartment buildings. 5,550 people live in about 2,500 units in 38 buildings, many of which are six-story brick structures. It is served by Public School 200, which is on land donated by Electchester. The union provided the majority of the mortgage. New York state offered tax abatements. Electchester was classified as a "limited dividend nonprofit", subject to state regulations. The first families paid $475 per room for equity shares, and carrying charges of $26 per month per room, on apartments ranging from three-and-a-half to five-and-a-half rooms.

Both housing complexes are patrolled by the N.Y.P.D.'s 107th Precinct. There is also an N.Y.P.D. P.S.A.-9 Housing Police Unit station located in the Pomonok Houses. Pomonok is part of Queens Community District 8.

=== Queensboro Hill ===
Queensboro Hill in southern Flushing is bordered to the west by College Point Boulevard, to the north by Kissena Park and Kissena Corridor Park, to the south by Reeves Avenue and the Long Island Expressway, and to the east by Kissena Boulevard. Queensboro Hill is a part of ZIP Codes 11355 and 11367 and contains the NewYork–Presbyterian/Queens hospital. One of the leading churches is the Queensboro Hill Community Church, a multi-racial congregation of the Reformed Church in America. Turtle Playground serves the residents of this section of Flushing. This area is often referred to as South Flushing.

=== Waldheim ===
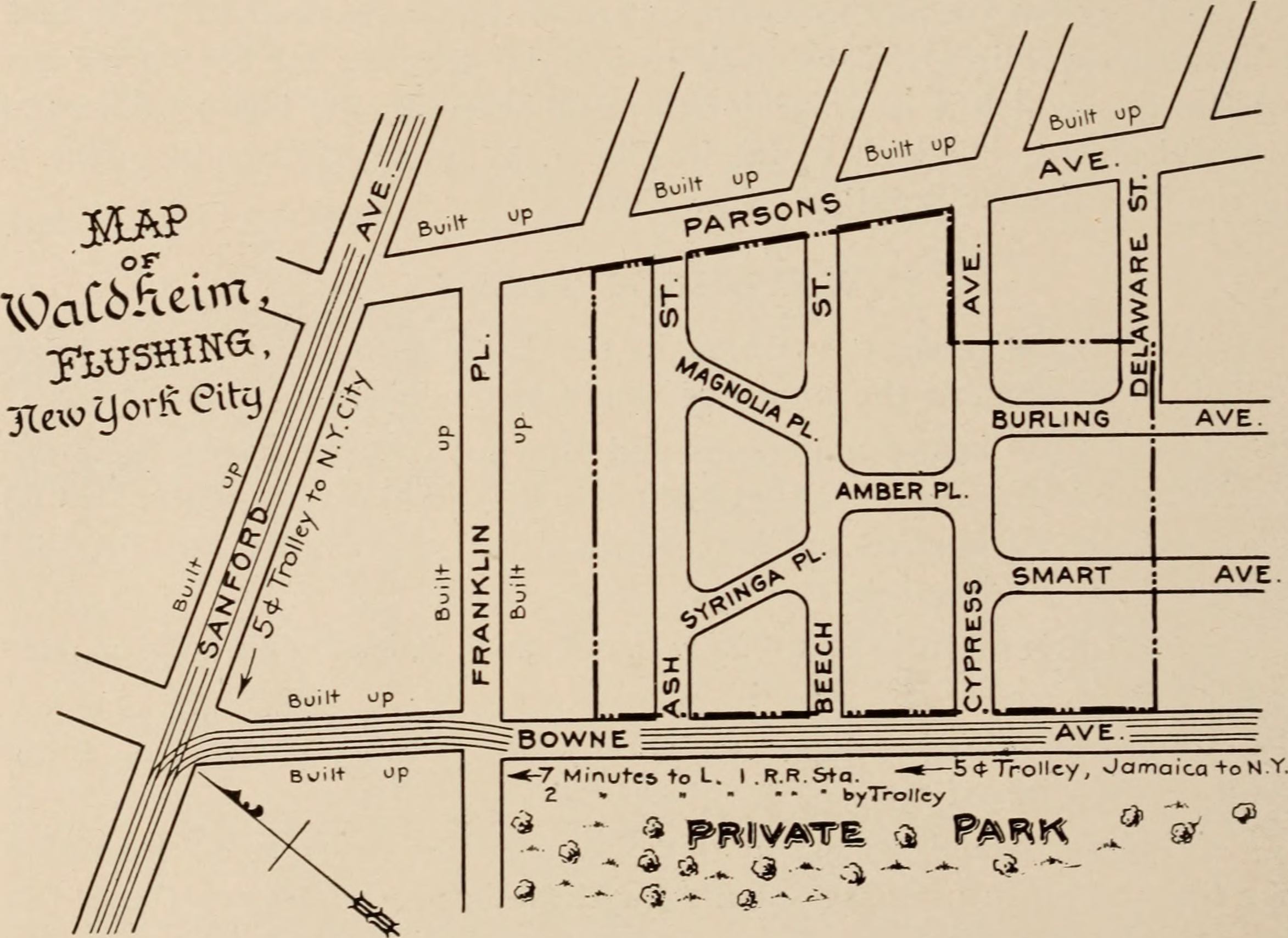
Map of Waldheim, early 20th century

The Waldheim neighborhood, an estate subdivision in Flushing constructed primarily between 1875 and 1925, is bound by Sanford and Franklin Avenues on the north, 45th Avenue on the south, Bowne Street on the west and Parsons Boulevard on the east. The area is immediately southeast of the downtown Flushing commercial core, and adjacent to Kissena Park. a small district of upscale "in-town" suburban architecture. Waldheim, German for "home in the woods", is known for its large homes of varying architectural styles and is laid out in an unusual street pattern.

Waldheim was the home of some of Flushing's wealthiest residents until the 1960s. Notable residents include the Helmann family of condiment fame, the Steinway piano-making family, as well as A. Douglas Nash, who managed a nearby Tiffany glass plant. Starting in the 1980s, homes in Waldheim were destroyed by the Korean American Presbyterian Church of Queens, one of the area's largest land owners. In 2008, the city rezoned the neighborhood to help preserve the low-density, residential character of the neighborhood. As with the Broadway neighborhood, preservationists have been unable to secure designation as an Historic District by the NYC Landmarks Preservation Commission, and as of 2017, structures in Waldheim were still being torn down.

== Points of interest ==
=== Houses of worship ===
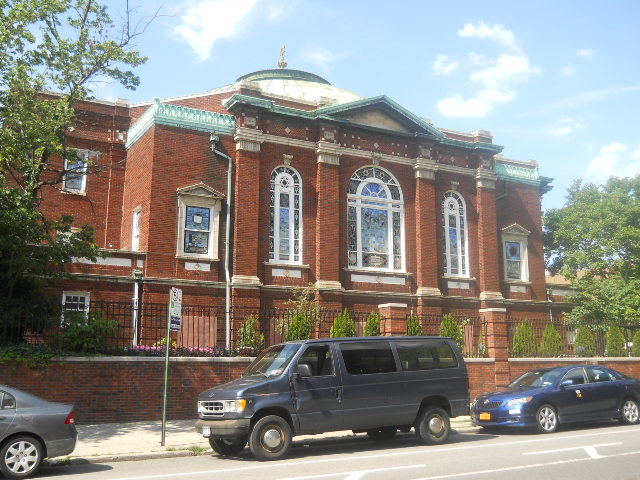
Free Synagogue of Flushing, located at 41–60 Kissena Boulevard, near Sanford Avenue

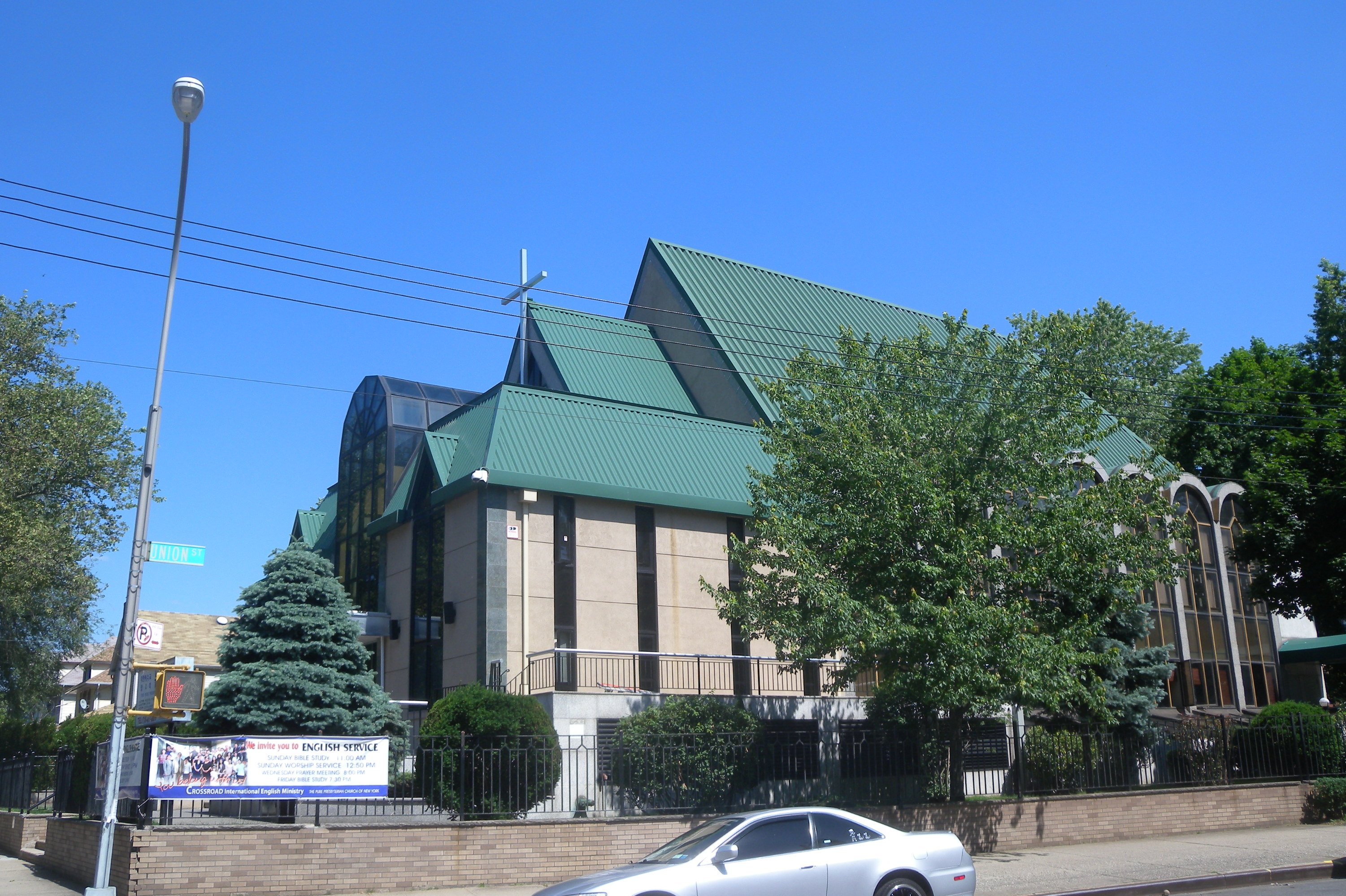
Pure Presbyterian Church, located at 142–08 32nd Avenue, near Union Street

Flushing is a religiously diverse community. Houses of worship in Flushing include the Dutch colonial epoch Quaker Meeting House, the historic Unitarian Universalist Congregation of Queens, St. Andrew Avellino Roman Catholic Church, St. George's Episcopal Church, the Free Synagogue of Flushing, the Congregation of Georgian Jews, St. Mel Roman Catholic Church, St. Michael's Catholic Church, St. Nicholas Greek Orthodox Shrine Church, Holy Annunciation Russian Orthodox Church, St. John's Lutheran Church, Queensboro Hill Community Church, Hindu Temple Society of North America, and the Muslim Center of New York.

There are more than 200 houses of worship in Flushing.

In 1657, while Flushing was still a Dutch settlement, a document known as the Flushing Remonstrance was created by Edward Hart, the town clerk, where some thirty ordinary citizens protested a ban imposed by Peter Stuyvesant, the director general of New Amsterdam, forbidding the harboring of Quakers. The Remonstrants cited the Flushing Town charter of 1645, which promised liberty of conscience.

=== Landmarks, museums, and cultural institutions ===
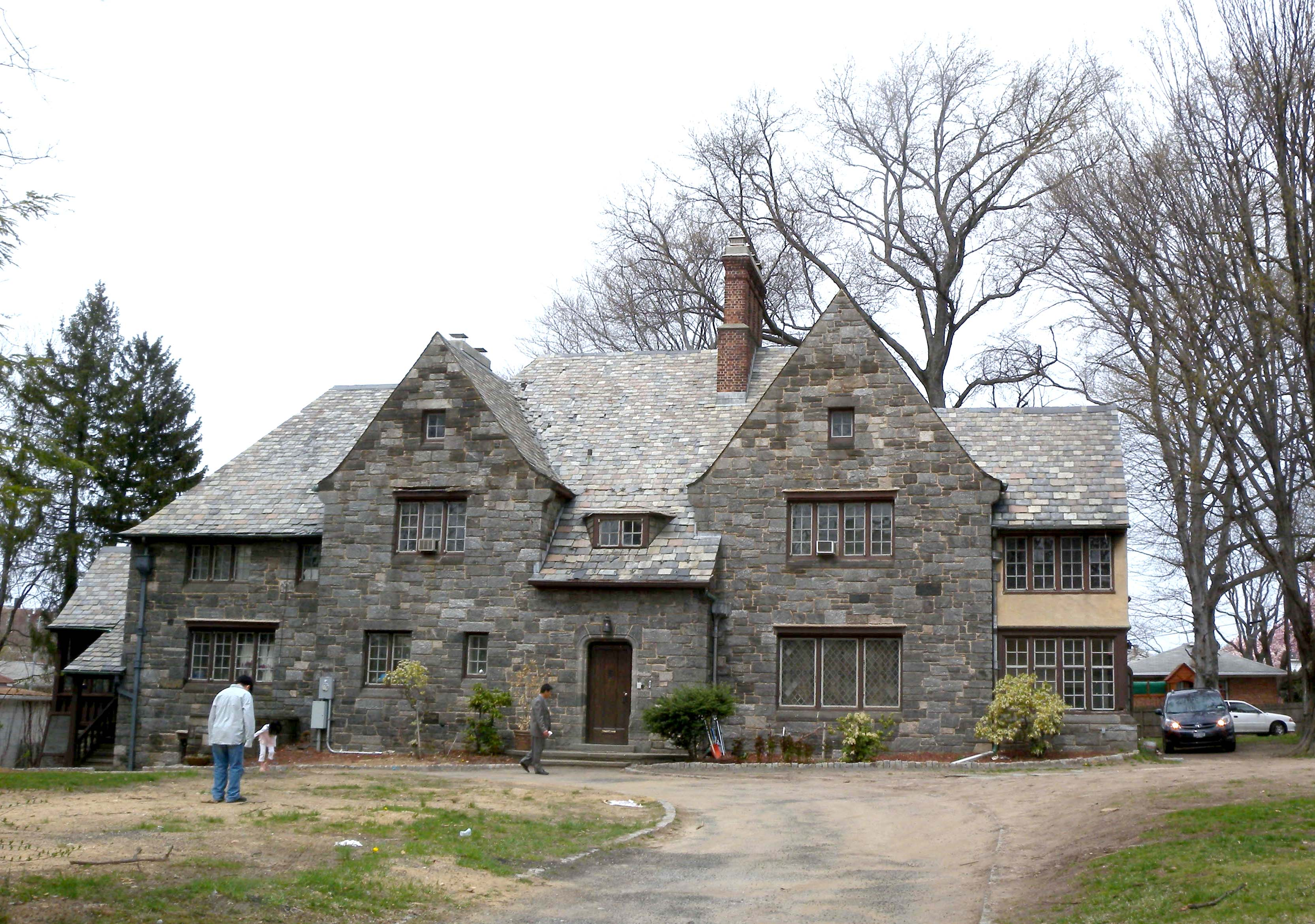
Fitzgerald-Ginsberg Mansion

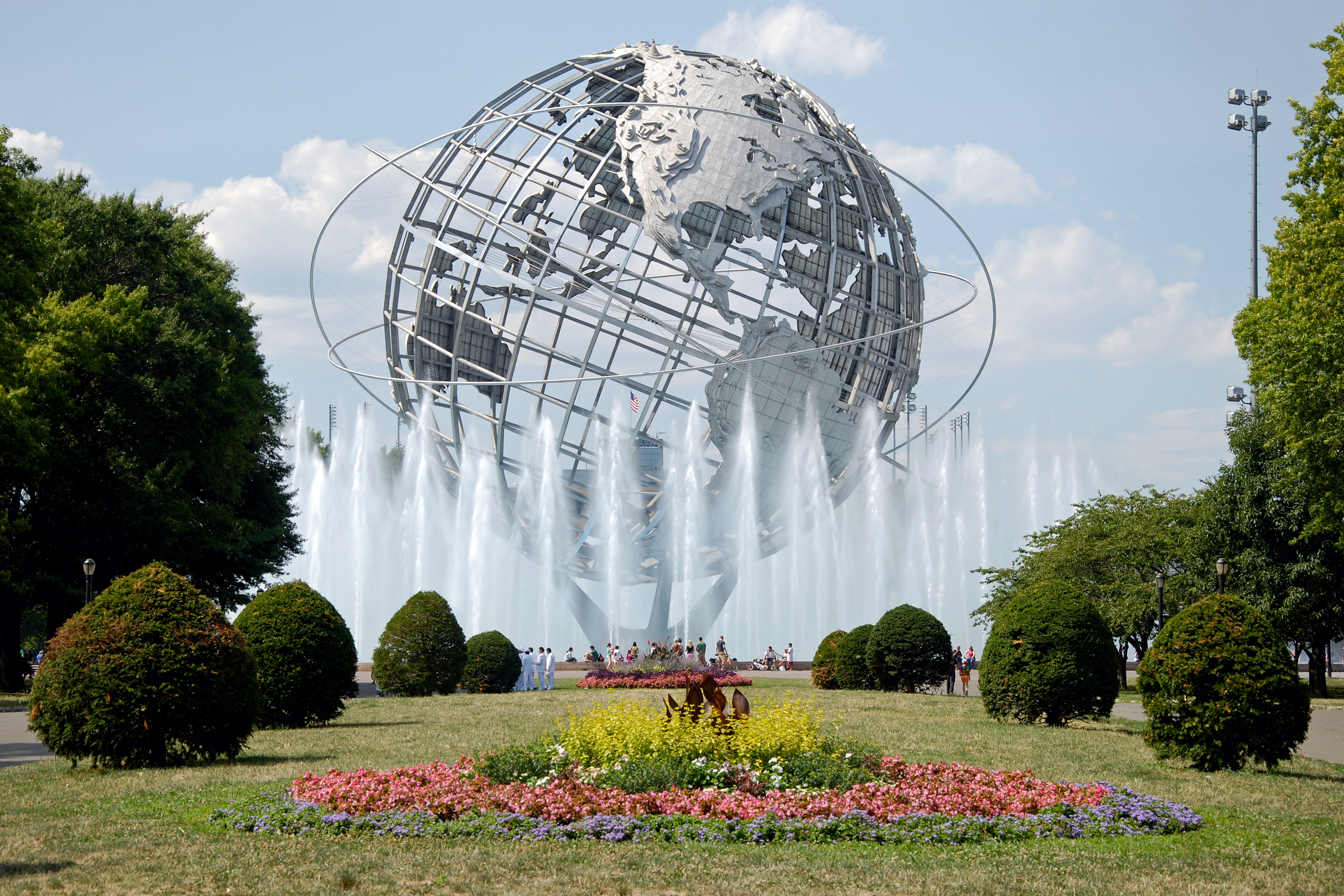
The Unisphere in Flushing Meadows–Corona Park, symbol of the 1964 New York World's Fair

Flushing has many registered New York City Landmarks, several of which are also located on the National Register of Historic Places. Several city landmarks are located on the Queens Historical Society's Freedom Mile. Flushing Town Hall on Northern Boulevard is the headquarters of the Flushing Council on Culture and the Arts, an affiliate of the Smithsonian Institution, and houses a concert hall and cultural center. Other landmarks include the Bowne House, Kingsland Homestead, the Weeping Beech, Old Quaker Meeting House, Flushing High School, St. George's Church, the Lewis H. Latimer House, and the lobby of the former RKO Keith's movie theater. The Flushing Armory, on Northern Boulevard, was formerly used by the National Guard.

There are several other landmarks in Flushing, but outside the Freedom Mile. These include the Protestant Reformed Dutch Church of Flushing, the Fitzgerald/Ginsberg Mansion, on Bayside Avenue and the Voelker Orth Museum, Bird Sanctuary and Victorian Garden. In addition, the Broadway-Flushing Historic District, Free Synagogue of Flushing, United States Post Office, and Main Street Subway Station (Dual System IRT) are listed on the National Register of Historic Places.

The Queens Botanical Garden is located on 39 acres (16 ha) between College Point Boulevard and Main Street. It has been in operation continuously since its opening as an exhibit at the 1939 New York World's Fair, and has been at its current location since 1963. The Botanical Garden carries on Flushing's horticultural tradition that dates back to the area's 18th-century tree nurseries and seed farms.

=== Parks ===
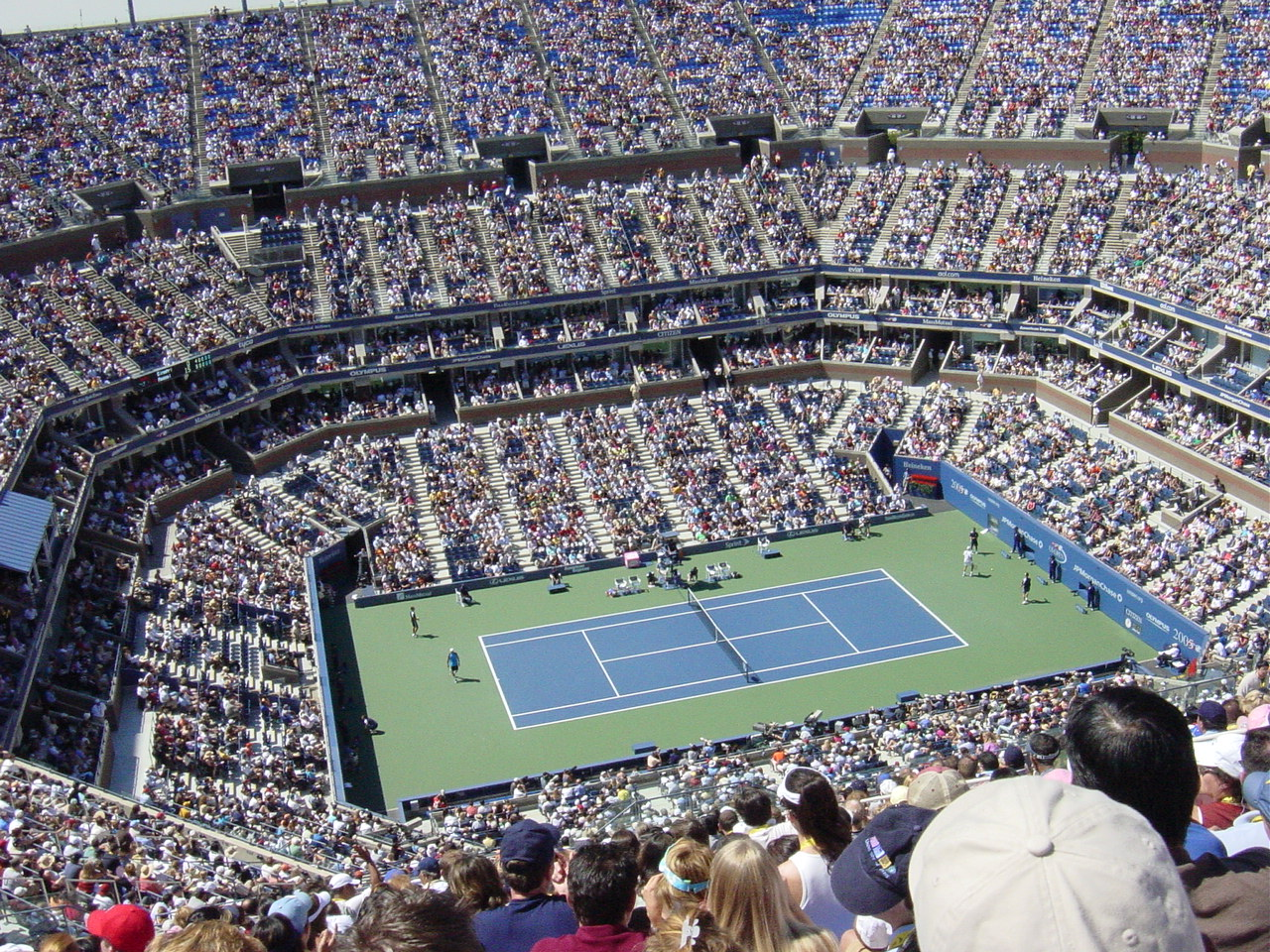
Arthur Ashe Stadium, built in 1997 at the USTA National Tennis Center in Flushing Meadows-Corona Park, is the world's largest tennis-specific stadium.

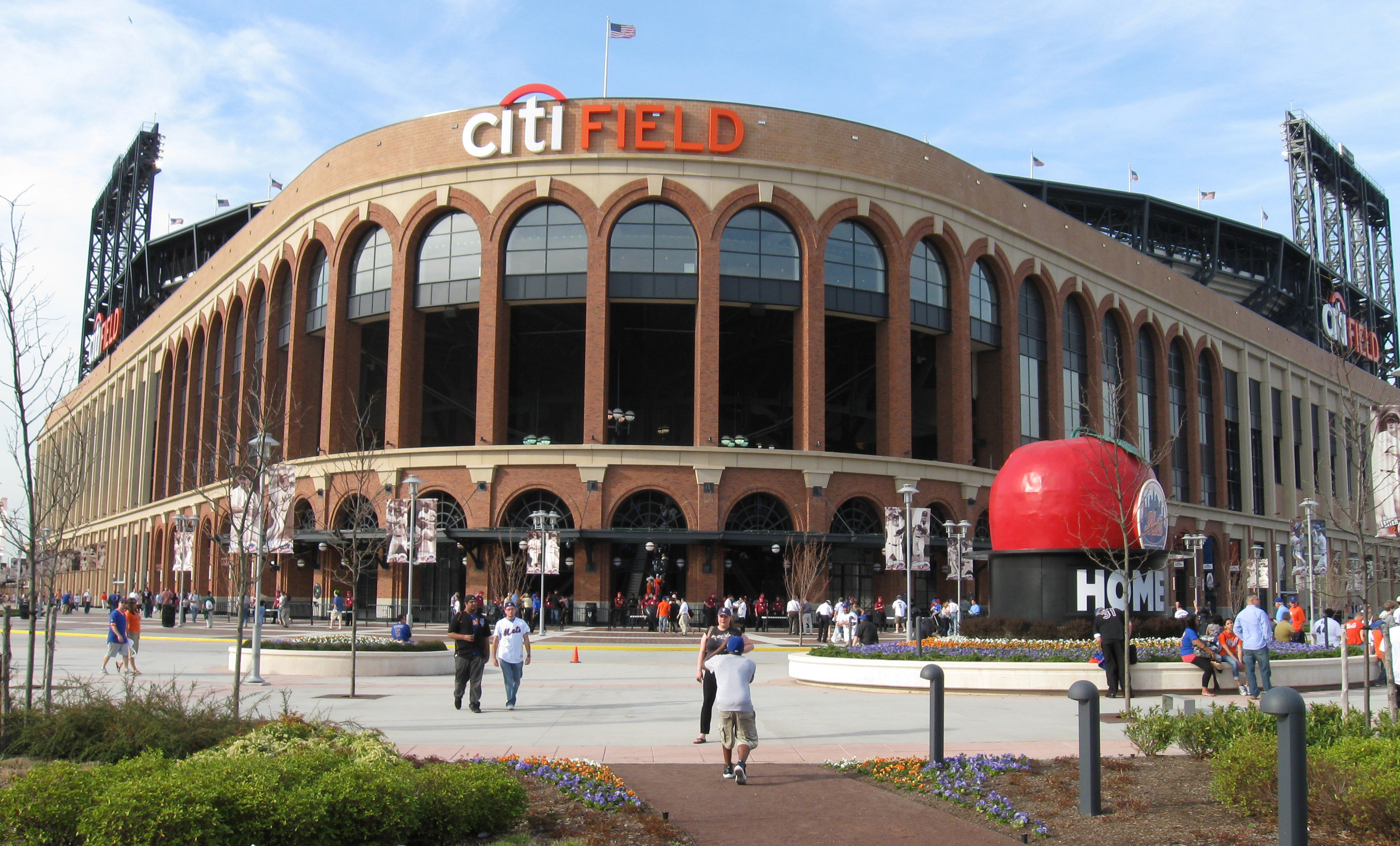
Citi Field, built in 2009 at Flushing Meadows-Corona Park, is the home of Major League Baseball's New York Mets.

Public parks and playgrounds in Flushing are supervised by the New York City Department of Parks and Recreation.

==== Flushing Meadows-Corona Park ====
Flushing Meadows–Corona Park, an 897-acre (3.63 km^{2}) park, is the largest park in Queens. The site hosted two World's Fairs, in 1939–1940 and 1964–1965, and the park infrastructure reflects the construction undertaken for the Fairs. The northern part of the park contains Citi Field, home of the New York Mets of Major League Baseball; the field, opened in 2009, replaced the former Shea Stadium. To the south is the USTA Billie Jean King National Tennis Center which is the home of the US Tennis Open.

Several attractions were originally developed for the World's Fairs in Flushing Meadows-Corona Park. One of the most prominent is the Unisphere, the iconic 12-story-high stainless steel globe that served as the centerpiece for the 1964 New York World's Fair, which was made a city landmark. Additionally, there is a stone marker for the two 5,000-year Westinghouse Time Capsules made of special alloys buried in the park, chronicling 20th-century life in the United States, dedicated both in 1938 and 1965. Also in the park are the Queens Museum of Art which features a scale model of the City of New York, the largest architectural model ever built; Queens Theatre in the Park; the New York Hall of Science; and the Queens Zoo. The New York State Pavilion was listed on the National Register of Historic Places in 2009.

==== Other parks ====
- Kissena Park is a 234-acre (0.95 km^{2}) park with a lake as a centerpiece.
- Kissena Corridor Park is a 100-acre (0.40 km^{2}) park which connects two separate corridors, adjoining Flushing Meadows–Corona Park to Kissena Park. It contains a baseball field and a playground called Rachel Carson Playground.
- Bowne Park is an 11-acre (45,000 m^{2}) park developed on the former estate of New York City Mayor Walter Bowne.
- Flushing Fields is a 10-acre (40,000 m^{2}) greenbelt that includes the home athletic field of Flushing High School.

=== Malls ===
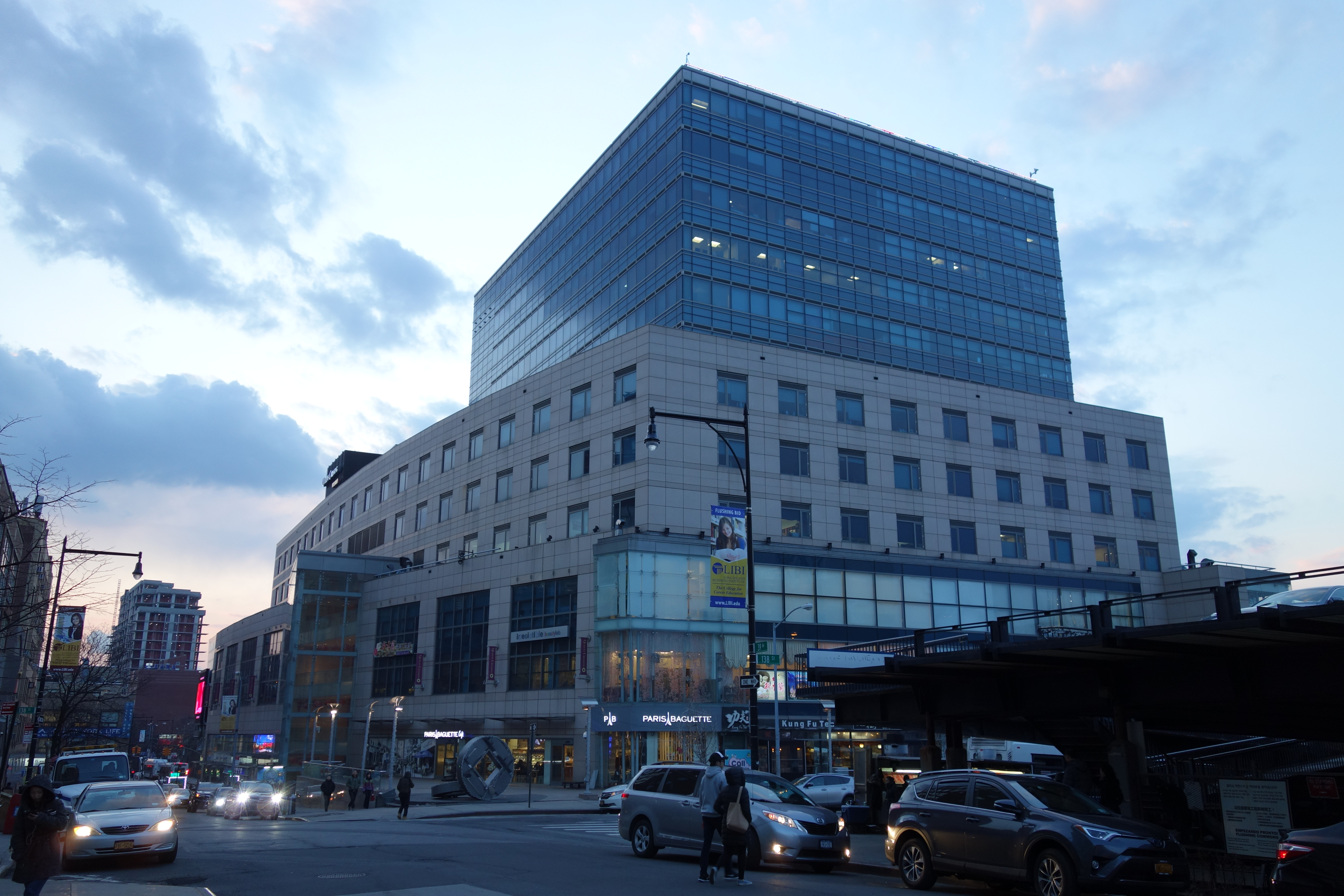
Queens Crossing

- Queens Crossing, at 39th Avenue and 136th Street, which opened in 2017.
- New World Mall, at Roosevelt Avenue east of Main Street
- One Fulton Square, at 39th Avenue and Prince Street, which opened in 2014.
- The Shops at Skyview Center, at College Point Boulevard and Roosevelt Avenue, which opened in 2010. The mall also contains a condominium development atop it.
- Flushing Commons, at 39th Avenue and Union Street, which opened its first phase in 2017. This is a multi-phase retail and housing development project.
- The entrance to Tangram Mall in fall 2026
  Tangram, at 39th Avenue and 133rd Street, which first opened in 2022. It houses a food hall, children's swim school, and the first 4DX movie theater in Queens.

== Police and crime ==
Flushing, College Point, and Whitestone are patrolled by the 109th Precinct of the NYPD, located at 37-05 Union Street. The 109th Precinct ranked 9th safest out of 69 patrol areas for per-capita crime in 2010. As of 2018, with a non-fatal assault rate of 17 per 100,000 people, Flushing and Whitestone's rate of violent crimes per capita is less than that of the city as a whole. The incarceration rate of 145 per 100,000 people is lower than that of the city as a whole.

The 109th Precinct has a lower crime rate than in the 1990s, with crimes across all categories having decreased by 83.7% between 1990 and 2018. The precinct reported 6 murders, 30 rapes, 202 robberies, 219 felony assaults, 324 burglaries, 970 grand larcenies, and 126 grand larcenies auto in 2018.

== Fire safety ==
Flushing contains the following New York City Fire Department (FDNY) fire stations:

- Engine Company 273/Ladder Company 129 – 40-18 Union Street
- Engine Company 274/Battalion 52 – 41-20 Murray Street
- Engine Company 320/Ladder Company 167 – 36-18 Francis Lewis Boulevard

In addition, FDNY EMS Station 52 is located at 135–16 38th Avenue.

== Health ==
As of 2018, preterm births and births to teenage mothers are less common in Flushing and Whitestone than in other places citywide. In Flushing and Whitestone, there were 63 preterm births per 1,000 live births (compared to 87 per 1,000 citywide), and 8 births to teenage mothers per 1,000 live births (compared to 19.3 per 1,000 citywide). Flushing and Whitestone have a higher than average population of residents who are uninsured. In 2018, this population of uninsured residents was estimated to be 14%, slightly higher than the citywide rate of 12%.

The concentration of fine particulate matter, the deadliest type of air pollutant, in Flushing and Whitestone is 0.0073 milligrams per cubic metre (7.3×10^{−9} oz/ft^{3}), less than the city average. Thirteen percent of Flushing and Whitestone residents are smokers, which is lower than the city average of 14% of residents being smokers. In Flushing and Whitestone, 13% of residents are obese, 8% are diabetic, and 22% have high blood pressure—compared to the citywide averages of 22%, 8%, and 23% respectively. In addition, 15% of children are obese, compared to the citywide average of 20%.

Ninety-five percent of residents eat some fruits and vegetables every day, which is higher than the city's average of 87%. In 2018, 71% of residents described their health as "good", "very good", or "excellent", lower than the city's average of 78%. For every supermarket in Flushing and Whitestone, there are 6 bodegas.

The nearest major hospitals are NewYork–Presbyterian/Queens and Flushing Hospital Medical Center. NewYork–Presbyterian/Queens serves Flushing as well as surrounding communities with comprehensive medical care services. Numerous tertiary medical clinics also serve the residents of Flushing.

== Post offices and ZIP Codes ==
Flushing is covered by multiple ZIP Codes. Downtown Flushing and western Murray Hill is covered by 11354; south Flushing, including Queensboro Hill and Waldheim, is included in 11355; and eastern Murray Hill and Broadway-Flushing fall within 11358. ZIP Codes 11356 and 11357, which are part of College Point and Whitestone respectively, also cover small parts of northern Flushing and Linden Hill. The United States Post Office operates three post offices nearby:

- Flushing Station – 41–65 Main Street
- Linden Hill Station – 29–50 Union Street
- Station A – 40–03 164th Street

ZIP Codes prefixed with 113 are administered from a sectional center at the Flushing Post Office. The 113-prefixed area extends west to Elmhurst and Jackson Heights; southwest to Ridgewood; south to Forest Hills; southeast to Fresh Meadows; and east to Bayside and Little Neck.

== Education ==
Flushing and Whitestone generally have a similar rate of college-educated residents to the rest of the city as of 2018. While 37% of residents age 25 and older have a college education or higher, 23% have less than a high school education and 40% are high school graduates or have some college education. By contrast, 39% of Queens residents and 43% of city residents have a college education or higher. The percentage of Flushing and Whitestone students excelling in math rose from 55% in 2000 to 78% in 2011, and reading achievement rose from 57% to 59% during the same time period.

Flushing and Whitestone's rate of elementary school student absenteeism is less than the rest of New York City. In Flushing and Whitestone, 9% of elementary school students missed twenty or more days per school year, lower than the citywide average of 20%. Additionally, 86% of high school students in Flushing and Whitestone graduate on time, more than the citywide average of 75%.

=== Public schools ===
IS 237

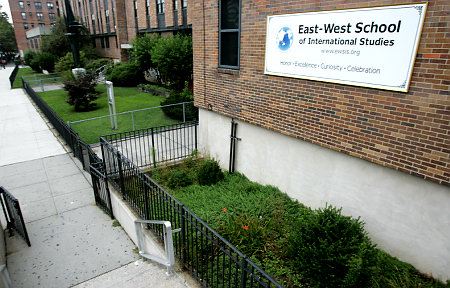
The East-West School

Flushing's public schools are operated by the New York City Department of Education. Flushing contains the following public elementary schools, which serve grades PK-5 unless otherwise indicated:

- PS 20 John Bowne
- PS 21 Edward Hart
- PS 22 Thomas Jefferson
- PS 24 Andrew Jackson (grades K-5)
- PS 32 State Street
- PS 107 Thomas A. Dooley
- PS 120
- PS 163 Flushing Heights
- PS 214 Cadwallader Colden
- PS 242 Leonard P Stavisky Early Childhood School (grades PK-3)
- PS 244 The Active Learning Elementary School (grades PK-3)

Public middle schools include:

- IS 25 Adrien Block
- JHS 185 Edward Bleeker
- JHS 189 Daniel Carter Beard
- IS 237 Rachel Carson
- East-West School of International Studies (grades 6–12). Located in the same building as I.S. 237

The eight public high schools in Flushing are:

- John Bowne High School
- East-West School of International Studies (grades 6–12)
- Robert F. Kennedy Community High School
- Townsend Harris High School, a selective high school located on the Queens College campus, was once ranked by U.S. News & World Report as one of the best public high schools in the United States.
- The Flushing International High School
- Flushing High School, the oldest free public high school (1875) in what is now New York City. It is housed in a distinctive Gothic Revival building built between 1912 and 1915 and declared a NYC Landmark in 1991.
- The Queens School of Inquiry
- Queens Academy High School

=== Private schools ===
The private high schools include:

- Archbishop Molloy High School
- Holy Cross High School

On December 22, 1980, The Japanese School of New York moved from Jamaica Estates, Queens into Fresh Meadows, Queens, near Flushing. In 1991, the school moved to Yonkers in Westchester County, New York, before moving to Greenwich, Connecticut in 1992.

As a result of the high number of Chinese and Korean immigrants with (Confucius) educationally orientated outlooks, there is a large number of cram schools (Buxiban and hagwon) located not only in Flushing, but also following Northern Blvd. west into Nassau County.

=== Higher education ===
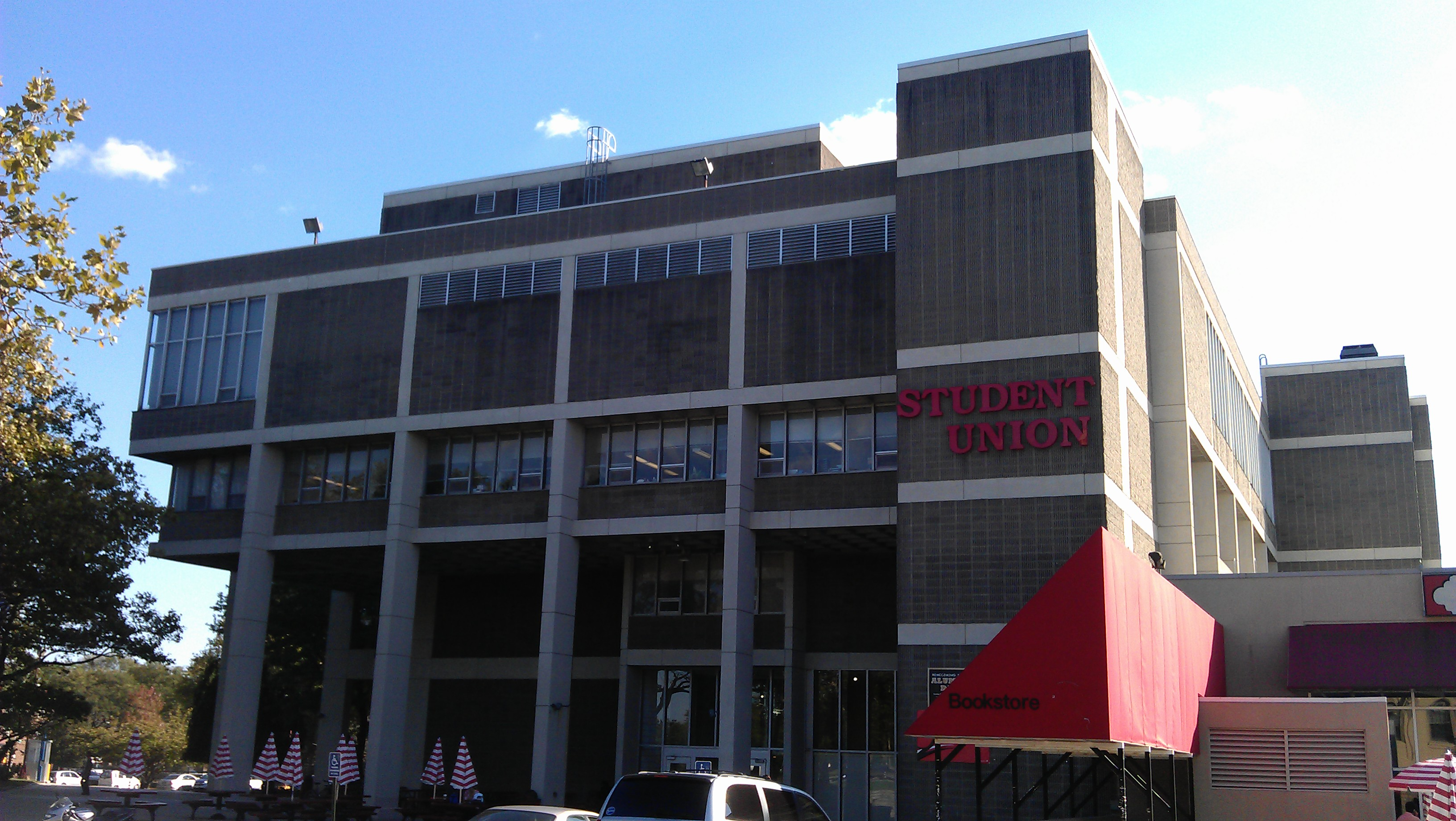
Queens College's Student Union building

Queens College, founded in 1937, is a senior college of the City University of New York (CUNY), and is commonly misconstrued to be within Flushing neighborhood limits due to its Flushing mailing address. It is actually located in the nearby neighborhood of Kew Gardens Hills on Kissena Boulevard near the Long Island Expressway. The City University of New York School of Law was founded in 1983 adjacent to the Queens College campus, and was located at 65–21 Main Street in Kew Gardens Hills until 2012. It moved to Long Island City for the Fall 2012 Semester. The Law School operates Main Street Legal Services Corp., a legal services clinic.

=== Libraries ===
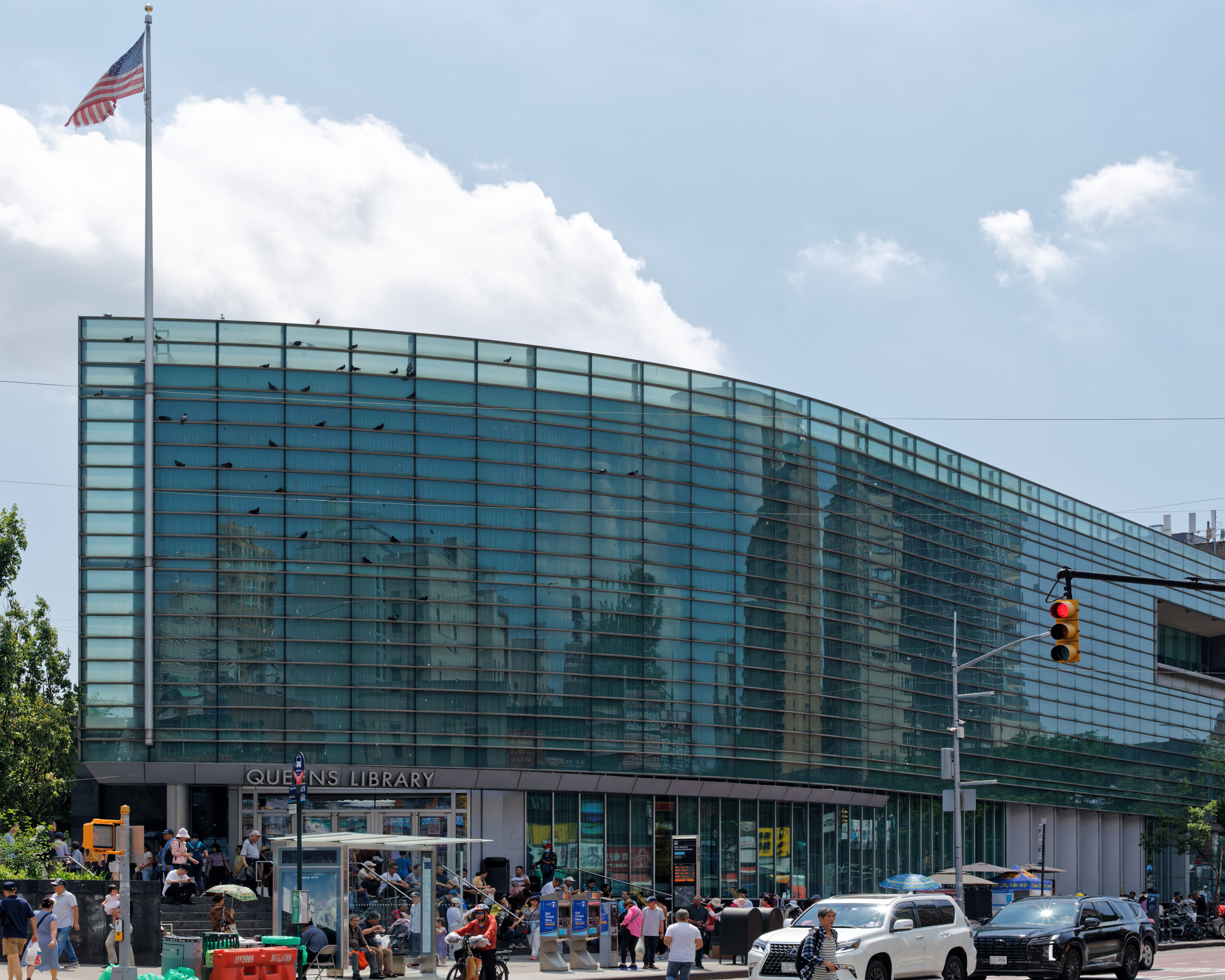
Branch of the Queens Public Library in Flushing

Flushing contained the first public library in Queens, founded in 1858. Today, Queens Public Library contains five libraries in Flushing.

The largest of the libraries is the Flushing branch, located at the intersection of Kissena Boulevard and Main Street in Flushing's central business district. It is the busiest branch of the Queens Public Library, the highest-circulation system in the United States. This library has an auditorium for public events. The current building, designed by Polshek Partnership Architects, is the third to be built on the site—the first was a Carnegie library, built through a gift of Andrew Carnegie.

The other branches are:

- East Flushing – 196-36 Northern Boulevard
- McGoldrick – 155-06 Roosevelt Avenue
- Mitchell-Linden – 31-32 Union Street
- Queensboro Hill – 60-05 Main Street

In addition, the Auburndale, Hillcrest, and Pomonok libraries carry Flushing addresses but are not located in Flushing proper.

== Transportation ==
=== Public transportation ===
The following MTA Regional Bus Operations bus routes serve Flushing:

- Q12: to Little Neck via Northern Boulevard
- Q13: to Fort Totten via Sanford Avenue and Northern Boulevard
- Q15: to Beechhurst via 41st Avenue and 150th Street
- Q16: to Fort Totten via Union Street and Bayside Avenue
- Q17: to Jamaica via Kissena Boulevard
- Q19: to Astoria via Northern Boulevard
- Q20: to Jamaica or College Point via Main Street and Union Street
- Q25: to Sutphin Boulevard–Archer Avenue–JFK Airport (E, J, and Z trains) or College Point via Kissena Boulevard, Main Street, and Linden Place
- Q26: to Fresh Meadows or College Point via Parsons Boulevard and 46th Avenue
- Q27: to Cambria Heights via Parsons Boulevard and 46th Avenue
- Q28: to Bay Terrace via Northern Boulevard and Crocheron Avenue
- Q44 SBS: to Jamaica or West Farms, Bronx via Main Street and Union Street
- Q50: to Co-op City, Bronx via Linden Place and Whitestone Expressway
- Q58 and Q98: to Myrtle–Wyckoff Avenues (L and M trains) via College Point Boulevard
- Q61: to Beechhurst via Linden Place and Willets Point Boulevard
- Q65: to Sutphin Boulevard–Archer Avenue–JFK Airport (E, J, and Z trains) via Sanford Avenue
- Q63 and Q66: to Queensboro Plaza (7, <7>, N and W trains) via Northern Boulevard
- Q90: to LaGuardia Airport via Roosevelt Avenue

The n20G Nassau Inter-County Express (NICE) bus route to Great Neck, which runs along Sanford Avenue and Northern Boulevard, terminates in Flushing. The n20x NICE bus route to Roslyn Clock Tower, which follows the n20G route that goes between Flushing and Great Neck, and the n20H that goes between Great Neck and Hicksville.

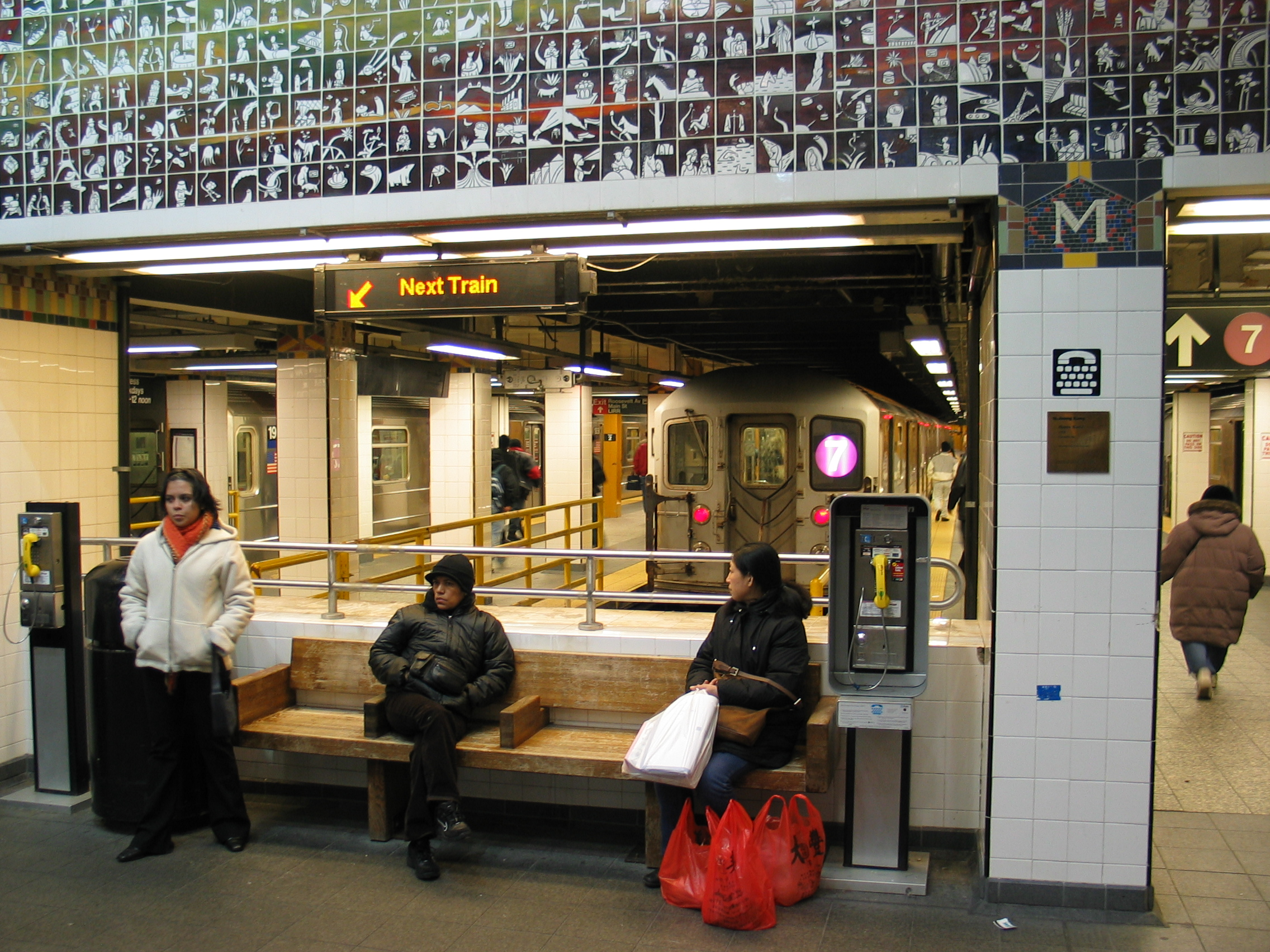
Flushing–Main Street, the terminal station of the IRT Flushing Line (7 and <7> trains)

There is one New York City Subway station in Flushing, the Flushing–Main Street station at Main Street and Roosevelt Avenue, served by the 7 and <7> trains. It is one of the busiest stations in the New York City Subway system as of 2018.

The Long Island Rail Road's Port Washington Branch also serves Flushing via the following stations:

- Mets–Willets Point
- Flushing–Main Street
- Murray Hill
- Broadway

=== Roads ===
Major highways that serve the area include the Van Wyck Expressway and Whitestone Expressway (Interstate 678), Grand Central Parkway, and Long Island Expressway (Interstate 495). Northern Boulevard (part of New York State Route 25A) extends from the Queensboro Bridge in Long Island City through Flushing into Nassau County. The Roosevelt Avenue Bridge over Flushing Creek was the largest fixed trunnion bascule type in the world when opened in 1927. However, it was decommissioned as a moving bridge when marine navigation was eliminated in the late 1930s.

== Political representation ==
The political stature of Flushing appears to be increasing significantly, with many Chinese from Flushing becoming New York City Council members. Taiwan-born John Liu, former New York City Council member representing District 20, which includes Flushing and other northern Queens neighborhoods, was elected New York City Comptroller in November 2009. In 2018, Liu defeated incumbent Tony Avella to become the first of two Asian Americans in the New York State Senate.

At the same time, Shanghai-born Peter Koo was elected to succeed Liu to assume this council membership seat. Additionally, in 2012 Flushing resident Grace Meng, a State Assembly Member, was elected to Congress as the first Asian-American member of the United States House of Representatives from the eastern United States.

== In popular culture ==
- The first series of Charmin toilet paper commercials featuring Mr. Whipple (Dick Wilson) were filmed in Flushing at the Trade Rite (now H-Mart) supermarket on Bowne Street and Roosevelt Avenue.
- The rock band Kiss first played at the Coventry Club on Queens Boulevard in 1973, and is said to have derived its name from Kissena Boulevard in Flushing.
- Joel Fleischman, the fictional character from the 1990s comedic drama Northern Exposure, was said to have relocated from Flushing. Often, references were made to actual locations around Main Street, Flushing.
- The eponymous celebration in Taiwanese director Ang Lee's 1993 comedy hit The Wedding Banquet takes place in Downtown Flushing's Sheraton LaGuardia East Hotel.
- Fran Drescher's character Fran Fine on the TV show The Nanny, was said to have been raised in Flushing, where her family still lived. Drescher was born in Flushing Hospital.
- Flushing was the location of the Stark Industries (later Stark International) munitions plant in Marvel Comics' original Iron Man series. In the movie Iron Man 2, the Stark Expo is located in Flushing.
- On the Norman Lear-produced TV show All in the Family, in the episode when Edith Bunker was arrested for shoplifting, she mentions the names of a few long-gone stores that were in downtown Flushing. The Bunkers also mention having lived on Union Street in Flushing.
- The main characters of The Black Stallion series resided in Flushing and many of Flushing's streets and landmarks in the 1940s were mentioned in the first book.
- In the musical Hair, the character Claude Bukowski is from Flushing.
- In episode seven of the TV show White Collar, main characters Neal Caffrey and FBI Special Agent Tim Burke investigate a crime that takes place in Chinatown, though part of the episode is actually filmed in Flushing.
- In The Simpsons episode "The City of New York vs. Homer Simpson", Homer, after having drunk a large quantity of crab juice and unable to find a restroom, sees a bus going to Flushing Meadows and imagines it to be a field full of toilets.
- The 2014 novel Preparation for the Next Life by Atticus Lish takes place largely in Flushing and surrounding neighborhoods. The novel depicts the unlikely romance between an Iraq War veteran and a Uighur immigrant.
- F. Scott Fitzgerald's The Great Gatsby alludes to Flushing: "About half way between West Egg (Great Neck) and New York, the motor road hastily joins the railroad and runs beside it for a quarter of a mile."

== Notable people ==
- Judd Apatow (born 1967), stand-up comedian, director, producer, actor, screenwriter
- Annet Artani (born 1976), singer-songwriter and international pop star
- Yak Ballz (born 1982), rapper, born Yashar Zadeh
- Daniel Carter Beard (1850–1941), founder of the Boy Scouts of America
- Jerry Beck (born 1955), animation historian
- Michael Bellusci (born 1960), musician
- Black Sheep, rap group
- James A. Bland (1854–1911), singer and composer
- Arthur Blank (born 1942), co-founder of The Home Depot and the owner of the Atlanta Falcons and Atlanta United
- Joe Bolton (1910–1986), host of the WPIX show "Clubhouse Gang" and "The Three Stooges Funhouse" as Officer Joe Bolton
- Action Bronson (born 1983), rapper
- Godfrey Cambridge (1933–1976), comedian and actor
- Margaret I. Carman (1890–1976), teacher who taught for 44 years at Flushing High School
- George Henry Clements (1854–1935), artist
- Cadwallader Colden (1688–1776), Lieutenant Governor and acting Governor for the Province of New York. Estate was at Springhill, now the location of Mount Hebron Cemetery.
- Glenn Consor, American-Israeli NBA and NCAA basketball analyst, who played collegiate and pro basketball
- Joseph Cornell (1903–1972), artist
- Manuel De Peppe (born 1970), actor, singer, musician, arranger, music producer, songwriter
- Harris Doran (born 1978), writer, director, actor, producer
- Fran Drescher (born 1957), actress, author, politician/humanitarian, cancer survivor, activist (known for The Nanny as Fran Fine)
- Thomas Duane (born 1955), first openly gay member of the New York State Senate
- Jimmy Durante (1893–1980), singer, pianist, comedian and actor
- Jon Favreau (born 1966), actor/producer/director
- F. Scott Fitzgerald (1896–1940), novelist who lived at 29–34 146th Street
- Franky G (born 1965), actor
- Mic Geronimo (born 1973), rapper
- Nancy Gertner (born 1946), federal court judge
- Charles Dana Gibson (1867–1944), illustrator
- Eugene Glazer (born 1939), Olympic fencer
- Mary Gordon (born 1949), writer
- Al Greenwood (born 1951), former keyboardist of Foreigner
- Steve Guttenberg (born 1958), actor, author, businessman, producer, and director
- Marvin Hamlisch (1944–2012), composer
- Han Hee-jun (born 1989), American Idol contestant
- Mark Hurd (1957–2019), former CEO of Hewlett-Packard and former CEO of Oracle Corp
- Dan Ingram (1934–2018), retired radio disc jockey
- Aldona Jonaitis (born 1948), American author and specialist in Northwest Coast art
- Sarah Jones (born 1973), Tony Award-winning stage actress and poet
- Marilyn Kagan (1951–2020), actress and psychotherapist
- Steve Karsay (born 1972), baseball player
- Keith and The Girl, podcasters
- Kevin "Flushing Flash" Kelley (born 1967), boxer
- Clarence King (1842–1901), explorer and geologist
- Yul Kwon (born 1975), television personality and winner of Survivor: Cook Islands
- Cathy Ladman (born 1955), stand-up comedian, actress, writer (grew up in Little Neck)
- Large Professor (born 1972), hip-hop producer
- Gene Larkin (born 1962), Major League Baseball player
- Lewis Latimer (1848–1928), inventor
- Martin Lawrence (born 1965), actor and comedian
- Sandra Lee, "Dr. Pimple Popper", TV and YouTube reality host
- Paul Martin Lester (1953–2023), author and educator
- Ken Levine (born 1966), creator of BioShock series; CEO of Irrational Games
- Reggie Lucas (1953–2018), musician, songwriter and record producer
- Gene Mayer (born 1956), tennis player
- Sandy Mayer (born 1952), tennis player
- Nettie Mayersohn (1924–2020), New York Assemblywoman from 1983 to 2011
- Charles Momsen (1896–1967), vice admiral who organized rescue of USS Squalus
- Robert Moog (1934–2005), inventor of the Moog synthesizer
- Rick Moonen, executive chef of RM Seafood and R Bar Café at Mandalay Bay
- Lewis Mumford (1895–1990), architecture critic and historian
- Tito Muñoz (born 1983), conductor and is music director of the Phoenix Symphony
- Richard Outcault (1863–1928), creator of Buster Brown, The Yellow Kid, and Hogan's Alley
- Jason Patric (Jason Miller, Jr.), (born 1966), film, television and stage actor.
- Samuel Parsons (1844–1923), landscape architect
- L. Bradford Prince (1840–1922), politician who was governor of New Mexico Territory
- Amy Ryan (born 1968), actress
- Nancy Reagan (1921–2016), actress and former First Lady
- Richard Riordan (1930–2023), Los Angeles mayor
- Peter Rosenthal (1941–2024), mathematician and lawyer
- Royal Flush (born 1975), rapper
- Martin Scorsese (born 1942), Oscar winning movie director
- David Schwimmer (born 1966), actor, comedian, director and producer
- John Seery, artist
- Kasey Smith (born 1990), Danger Danger keyboardist
- Paul Stanley (born 1952), member of the band KISS
- Beau Starr (1944–2026), actor
- Mike Starr (born 1950), actor
- Henry E. Steinway (1797–1871), founder of Steinway & Sons piano company
- Jeannie Suk, professor of law / Harvard Law School
- Himanshu Suri (born 1985), musician
- Tobias Truvillion (born 1975), actor
- Bill Viola (1951–2024), video artist
- Tommy Victor (born 1966), rock singer, guitarist, songwriter
- John Vinocur (1940–2022), journalist
- Harvey (born 1952) and Bob Weinstein (born 1954), founders of Miramax and the Weinstein Company
- Suzanne Weyn, children's author
- John Williams (born 1932), Academy Award-winning film composer
- Susan Wu Rathbone (1921–2019), a community leader in New York City, founder and head of the Chinese Immigrants Service and the Queens Chinese Women's Association
- Najibullah Zazi (born 1985), convicted al-Qaeda member

== See also ==
- List of Queens neighborhoods
- Community boards of Queens
