= Rachel Carson Playground =

Public park in Queens, New York

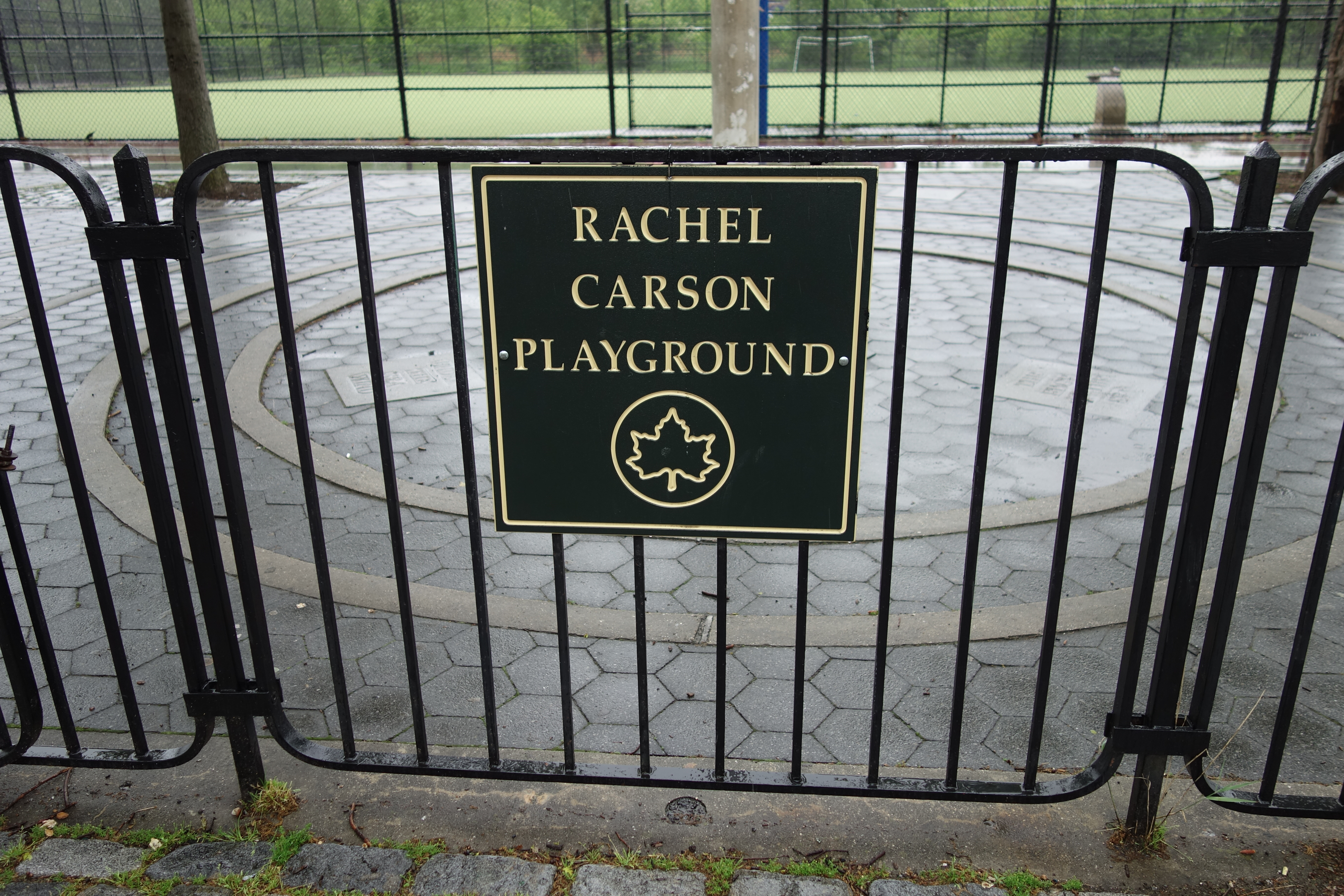
- Interactive map of Rachel Carson Playground
- Type: Public park
- Location: Flushing, New York
- Coordinates: 40°44′59″N 73°49′22″W
- Created: 1946
- Operator: NYC Parks
- Status: Open

Rachel Carson Playground, also known as Silent Spring Playground, is a park located in Flushing, Queens, New York City. It is located across the street from IS 237, which owns the park.

== Description ==
The park, opened in 1946, was named to honor Rachel Carson and her widely sold book Silent Spring. The park is located between Juniper and Geranium Avenues on Colden Street. It is part of the larger Kissena Corridor Park. In that same year the park was formally named Playground for All Children.

In 1978 the government spent $351,000 for a project which allowed the park to be accessible to children regardless of physical ability. In 1999 Councilwoman Julia Harrison spent $421,395 for renovating the park. She established a baseball diamond with chain-link backstop, dugouts, and drinking fountains. She also established basketball courts, handball courts, running tracks, picnic areas with tables. In 2011, the park underwent some new renovations for the first time in 12 years. The main effect of the renovation took place on what used to be the baseball diamond, which now has a green platform. Another renovation took place between 2017 and 2018.

== Features ==
- Baseball diamond (green platform)
- Four handball courts
- Basketball court
- Running track
- Benches
- Picnic area with tables
- Trellis
- Flagpole
- Cement blocks with depictions of sea creatures, and the titles of Carson's three books before Silent Spring to commemorate her life's passion

The adjacent Silent Springs Playground is a tribute to her most influential work and now holds swings for tots and kids, benches, a game table, play equipment with safety surfacing, a spray shower, and a basketball court.
