= List of New York City Designated Landmarks in Queens =

The New York City Landmarks Preservation Commission (LPC), formed in 1965, is the New York City governmental commission that administers the city's Landmarks Preservation Law. Since its founding, it has designated over a thousand landmarks, classified into four categories: individual landmarks, interior landmarks, scenic landmarks, and historic districts.

The New York City borough of Queens contains 82 landmarks designated by the LPC, (Note: This includes one listing shared with another borough, the Queensboro Bridge (LP-0828). However, a mass listing of Historic Street Lampposts (LP-1961) is not included in this count, because there is a high number of lampposts that are geographically spread out.) 4 interior landmarks, and 13 historic districts. The following is a complete list as of 2022. Some of these are also National Historic Landmark (NHL) sites, and NHL status is noted where known.

== Historic districts ==
Landmark name	Image	Date listed (Note: The number below each date is the number assigned to each location by the Landmarks Preservation Commission. The landmark designation report can be viewed by clicking the number.) (Note: For an interactive map, refer to "Discover New York City Landmarks". New York City Landmarks Preservation Commission – via ArcGIS.)	Location	Neighborhood	Description
Addisleigh Park Historic District	Addisleigh Park Historic District	February 1, 2011 (#2405)	40°41′38″N 73°46′27″W	St. Albans	A residential neighborhood consisting of single-family homes built in a variety of styles between the 1910s and 1930s.: Also a U.S. historic district.
Cambria Heights–222nd Street Historic District		June 28, 2022 (#2655)	40°41′51″N 73°44′13″W	Cambria Heights	Forty-six Storybook-style houses on 222nd Street between 115th Road and 116th Avenue, completed in 1931. One of the two first landmark districts in Cambria Heights, along with the Cambria Heights–227th Street Historic District.
Cambria Heights–227th Street Historic District		June 28, 2022 (#2656)	40°41′38″N 73°44′01″W	Cambria Heights	Fifty Storybook-style houses on 227th Street between 116th Avenue and Linden Boulevard, completed in 1931. One of the two first landmark districts in Cambria Heights, along with the Cambria Heights–222nd Street Historic District.
Central Ridgewood Historic District	Central Ridgewood Historic District	December 9, 2014 (#2448)	40°42′15″N 73°54′00″W	Ridgewood	A series of houses built between 1895 and 1927, largely comprising two-story, brick rowhouse dwellings with one apartment per floor.: Also a U.S. historic district.
Douglaston Historic District	Douglaston Historic District	June 24, 1997 (#1957)	40°46′30″N 73°45′03″W	Douglaston	A residential neighborhood with more than 600 single-family residences on Little Neck Peninsula, built in various styles in the early and mid-20th century.: Also a U.S. historic district.
Douglaston Hill Historic District	Douglaston Hill Historic District	December 14, 2004 (#2155)	40°46′07″N 73°44′49″W	Douglaston	Thirty-one single-family residences on Little Neck Peninsula, built in various styles from the 1890s to the 1930s.: Also a U.S. historic district.
Fort Totten Historic District	Fort Totten Historic District	June 29, 1999 (#2040)	40°47′36″N 73°46′38″W	Fort Totten	Former military fortification with more than 100 buildings and structures erected from the 1830s to the 1960s.
Hunters Point Historic District	Hunters Point Historic District	May 15, 1968 (#0450)	40°44′50″N 73°56′47″W	Long Island City	A collection of 47 Italianate, French Second Empire, and Neo-Grec townhouses on 45th Avenue, built in 1871–1890.: Also a U.S. historic district.
Jackson Heights Historic District	Jackson Heights Historic District	October 19, 1993 (#1831)	40°45′06″N 73°53′05″W	Jackson Heights	A series of residential buildings in different sizes and styles, erected in 1914–1939 as part of the largest planned community of cooperative and garden apartments in the United States.: Also a U.S. historic district.
Ridgewood North Historic District	Ridgewood North Historic District	September 15, 2009 (#2319)	40°42′24″N 73°54′15″W	Ridgewood	A collection of 96 buildings, mostly three-story brick rowhouses called "Mathews Model Flats", built in 1908–1914 by the G.X. Mathews Company.: Overlaps with the Woodbine–Palmetto–Gates Historic District, a U.S. historic district.
Ridgewood South Historic District	Ridgewood South Historic District	October 26, 2010 (#2348)	40°42′10″N 73°54′15″W	Ridgewood	A collection of 210 buildings, including three-story brick rowhouses as well as the St. Matthias Roman Catholic Church, built in 1911–1912 by the G.X. Mathews Company.: Overlaps with the Seneca–Onderdonk–Woodward Historic District, a U.S. historic district.
Stockholm Street Historic District		November 28, 2000 (#2081)	40°42′31″N 73°54′49″W	Ridgewood	Thirty-six two-story brick rowhouses, two garages, and a stable built primarily in 1907-1910 by Joseph Weiss & Company along Stockholm Street, the only remaining brick street in Ridgewood.: Overlaps with the Stockholm–DeKalb–Hart Historic District, a U.S. historic district.
Sunnyside Gardens Historic District	Sunnyside Gardens Historic District	June 26, 2007 (#2258)	40°44′47″N 73°54′58″W	Sunnyside Gardens	A collection of 1,202 residences across 77 acres (31 ha), developed by Clarence Stein and Henry Wright between 1924 and 1928 as part of the first garden city in the United States.: Also a U.S. historic district.

== Individual landmarks ==
Landmark name	Image	Date listed	Location	Neighborhood	Description
35-34 Bell Boulevard		October 19, 2004 (#2154)	35-34 Bell Boulevard; 40°44′44″N 73°51′37″W	Bayside	Colonial Revival house built in 1905–1906 with a distinctive cobblestone facade.
53rd (now 101st) Precinct Police Station	53rd (now 101st) Precinct Police Station	May 29, 2018 (#2610)	16-12 Mott Avenue; 40°36′11″N 73°45′00″W	Far Rockaway	First police station in the Rockaways built by the New York City government, erected 1927–1928 in the Renaissance Revival and Colonial Revival styles.
Adrian and Ann Wyckoff Onderdonk House	Adrian and Ann Wyckoff Onderdonk House	March 21, 1995 (#1923)	18-20 Flushing Avenue; 40°42′40″N 73°55′12″W	Ridgewood	One of a few remaining 18th-century stone houses with gambrel roofs in New York City.: Also on the National Register of Historic Places
Allen-Beville House (Benjamin P. Allen House)	Allen-Beville House (Benjamin P. Allen House)	January 11, 1977 (#0944)	29 Center Drive; 40°46′22″N 73°45′03″W	Douglaston	One of Douglaston's oldest homes, built in 1848–1850 in the Greek Revival style.: Also on the National Register of Historic Places, and overlaid by the Douglaston Historic District
Louis Armstrong House		December 13, 1988 (#1555)	34-56 107th Street; 40°45′16″N 73°51′42″W	Corona	Former home of musician Louis Armstrong, a brick-covered frame structure erected in 1910.
Astoria Park Pool and Play Center	Astoria Park Pool and Play Center	June 20, 2006 (#2196)	19th Street between 22nd Drive and Hoyt Avenue North; 40°46′44″N 73°55′21″W	Astoria	One of several Works Progress Administration recreation centers, built in 1936.
Bank of Manhattan Company Building aka Long Island City Clocktower	Bank of Manhattan Company Building aka Long Island City Clocktower	May 12, 2015 (#2570)	29-27 41st Avenue; 40°45′00″N 73°56′11″W	Long Island City	Queens' first skyscraper, a neo-Gothic clock tower built in 1927 by the Manhattan Company.
Benevolent and Protective Order of Elks, Lodge Number 878		August 14, 2001 (#2086)	82-10 Queens Boulevard; 40°44′14″N 73°52′52″W	Elmhurst	Italian Renaissance Palazzo Elks lodge built in 1923–1924.: Also on the National Register of Historic Places
John Bowne House		February 15, 1966 (#0143)	37-01 Bowne Street; 40°45′46″N 73°49′30″W	Flushing	Oldest house in Queens, an English Colonial house built in 1661. It was home to John Bowne and nine generations of his family.: Also on the National Register of Historic Places
Bowne Street Community Church	Bowne Street Community Church	December 13, 2016 (#2137)	143-11 Roosevelt Avenue; 40°45′41″N 73°49′26″W	Flushing	Romanesque Revival church built in 1891–1892 in Flushing, an early center of religious tolerance.
Brinckerhoff Cemetery		August 14, 2012 (#2087)	69-71 182nd Street; 40°43′55″N 73°47′18″W	Fresh Meadows	One of Queens' oldest colonial cemeteries, dating from 1730.
Ralph Johnson Bunche House		May 17, 2005 (#2175)	115-24 Grosvenor Road; 40°42′23″N 73°50′13″W	Kew Gardens	Former home of diplomat Ralph Bunche, a neo-Tudor house built in 1927.: Also on the National Register of Historic Places as a National Historic Landmark
Congregation Tifereth Israel	Congregation Tifereth Israel	February 12, 2008 (#2283)	109-18 54th Avenue; 40°44′32″N 73°51′11″W	Corona	A Gothic and Moorish synagogue built in 1911.: Also on the National Register of Historic Places
Richard Cornell Graveyard		August 18, 1970 (#0741)	1457 Greenport Road; 40°36′01″N 73°44′59″W	Far Rockaway	One of New York City's surviving 18th-century cemeteries. Private burial ground of the Cornell family in the 18th and 19th centuries.
Creedmoor (Cornell) Farmhouse	Creedmoor (Cornell) Farmhouse	November 9, 1976 (#0941)	73-50 Little Neck Parkway; 40°44′54″N 73°43′13″W	Bellerose	Colonial farmhouse built in 1772, and operated as part of the Queens County Farm Museum.
Daniel and Abbie B. Eldridge House		December 20, 2011 (#2473)	87-61 111th Street; 40°41′43″N 73°50′10″W	Richmond Hill	Italianate-style villa built in 1870 as one of the first developments in the Richmond Hill area.
Firehouse, Engine Company 258, Hook and Ladder Company 115		June 20, 2006 (#2200)	10-40 47th Avenue; 40°44′42″N 73°57′06″W	Long Island City	Renaissance Revival firehouse built in 1902–1904.
Firehouse, Engine Companies 264 and 328, Ladder Company 134		May 29, 2018 (#2609)	16-15 Central Avenue; 40°36′16″N 73°45′08″W	Far Rockaway	Renaissance Revival and Colonial Revival firehouse built in 1910–1912.
Firehouse, Engine Company 268, Ladder Company 137		February 12, 2013 (#2527)	259 Beach 116th Street; 40°34′51″N 73°50′18″W	Rockaway Park	Colonial Revival firehouse built in 1912–1913.
Firehouse, Engine Company 289, Ladder Company 138		June 22, 1999 (#2035)	97-28 43rd Avenue; 40°44′47″N 73°51′55″W	Corona	Neoclassical firehouse built in 1912–1914.
Firehouse, Engine Company 305		June 12, 2012 (#2522)	111-02 Queens Boulevard; 40°43′06″N 73°50′16″W	Forest Hills	Neo-Medieval firehouse built in 1912–1914.
First Reformed Church of Jamaica	First Reformed Church of Jamaica	January 30, 1996 (#1939)	153-10 Jamaica Avenue; 40°42′09″N 73°48′08″W	Jamaica	Romanesque Revival church built in 1858–1859.: Also on the National Register of Historic Places
Fitzgerald/Ginsberg Mansion		September 20, 2005 (#2160)	145-15 Bayside Avenue; 40°46′16″N 73°49′24″W	Linden Hill	Tudor Revival mansion built in 1924 for Charles and Florence Fitzgerald, then occupied by Ethel and Morris Ginsberg.: Also on the National Register of Historic Places
Flushing High School		January 8, 1991 (#1798)	35-01 Union Street; 40°45′54″N 73°49′39″W	Flushing	New York City's oldest high school, designed in the Collegiate Gothic style and built in 1912–1915.
Flushing Municipal Courthouse/Flushing Town Hall	Flushing Municipal Courthouse/Flushing Town Hall	July 30, 1968 (#0139)	137-35 Northern Boulevard; 40°45′50″N 73°49′49″W	Flushing	Romanesque Revival courthouse and town hall built in 1862.: Also on the National Register of Historic Places
Forest Park Carousel		June 25, 2013 (#2528)	Forest Park; 40°42′01″N 73°51′24″W	Woodhaven	Carousel with 52 figures, most carved by Daniel Muller from 1903 to 1909.: Also on the National Register of Historic Places
Fort Totten Battery		September 24, 1974 (#0826)	Fort Totten Park; 40°47′48″N 73°46′46″W	Fort Totten	Fortification built between 1817 and 1864 as part of the Third System of fortifications: Overlaid by the Fort Totten Historic District
Fort Totten Officers' Club		September 24, 1974 (#0827)	Fort Totten Park; 40°47′32″N 73°46′41″W	Fort Totten	Gothic Revival castellated structure built in 1870, one of a few such designs in New York City.: Also on the National Register of Historic Places, and overlaid by the Fort Totten Historic District
Friends Meeting House	Friends Meeting House	August 18, 1970 (#0141)	137-16 Northern Boulevard; 40°45′47″N 73°49′49″W	Flushing	New York City's oldest surviving house of worship, built in 1694.: Also on the National Register of Historic Places as a National Historic Landmark
John Birks "Dizzy" Gillespie Residence		June 27, 2023 (#2657)	105-19 37th Avenue; 40°45′15″N 73°51′44″W	Corona	Multi-family home that was Dizzy Gillespie's residence for 12 years.
Grace Episcopal Church and Graveyard	Grace Episcopal Church and Graveyard	May 25, 1967 (#0487)	155-03 Jamaica Avenue; 40°42′13″N 73°48′04″W	Jamaica	Gothic Revival church built in 1861–1862, with one of New York City's oldest graveyards.: Also on the National Register of Historic Places
Arthur Hammerstein House		July 27, 1982 (#1282)	168-11 Powells Cove Boulevard; 40°47′37″N 73°50′24″W	Whitestone	Former home of producer Arthur Hammerstein, a neo-Tudor house built in 1924.
Hawthorne Court Apartments		November 25, 2014 (#2461)	215-37 to 215-43 43rd Avenue and 42-22 to 42-38 216th Street; 40°45′44″N 73°45′59″W	Bayside	Tudor Revival apartment complex built in 1930–1931.
Jamaica Chamber of Commerce Building		October 26, 2010 (#2386)	89-31 161st Street; 40°42′20″N 73°47′57″W	Jamaica	Georgian Revival office building constructed in 1928–1929.: Also on the National Register of Historic Places
Jamaica High School/Jamaica Educational Campus	Jamaica High School/Jamaica Educational Campus	March 24, 2009 (#2316)	167-01 Gothic Drive; 40°42′51″N 73°47′53″W	Jamaica Estates	Gothic Revival structure built in 1925–1927 to replace the old Jamaica High School building on Hillside Avenue.
Jamaica High School/Jamaica Learning Center	Jamaica High School/Jamaica Learning Center	June 25, 2013 (#2538)	162-02 Hillside Avenue; 40°42′30″N 73°47′59″W	Jamaica	Dutch Revival structure built in 1895–1896.
Jamaica Savings Bank, Jamaica Avenue	Jamaica Savings Bank, Jamaica Avenue	February 12, 2008 (#2109)	161-02 Jamaica Avenue; 40°42′13″N 73°47′55″W	Jamaica	Beaux-Arts building constructed in 1897–1898.: Also on the National Register of Historic Places
Jamaica Savings Bank, Sutphin Boulevard	Jamaica Savings Bank, Sutphin Boulevard	October 26, 2010 (#2393)	146-21 Jamaica Avenue; 40°42′07″N 73°48′29″W	Jamaica	Moderne bank built in 1939.
King Manor		April 19, 1966 (#0145)	150th Street and Jamaica Avenue; 40°42′11″N 73°48′14″W	Jamaica	Residence of Founding Father Rufus King, one of Queens' few remaining 18th Century American Colonial houses.: Also on the National Register of Historic Places as a National Historic Landmark
Kingsland Homestead		October 14, 1965 (#0005)	143-35 37th Avenue; 40°45′49″N 73°49′27″W	Flushing	Second oldest house in Flushing, a Dutch Colonial house built in 1774.: This building was originally designated as a landmark with the address 40-25 155th Street. The designation was amended on June 30, 2020, to also include the grounds of the property.; Also on the National Register of Historic Places
J. Kurtz and Sons Store Building		November 24, 1981 (#1132)	162-24 Jamaica Avenue; 40°42′15″N 73°47′49″W	Jamaica	Art Deco store built in 1931.: Also on the National Register of Historic Places
La Casina		January 30, 1996 (#1940)	90-33 160th Street; 40°42′16″N 73°47′58″W	Jamaica	Streamlined Moderne building erected in 1933.
Lewis H. Latimer House		March 21, 1995 (#1924)	34-41 137th Street; 40°45′58″N 73°49′46″W	Flushing	Former home of inventor Lewis H. Latimer, a Queen Anne style frame house built in 1887–1889.
Lawrence Cemetery		August 2, 1967 (#0630)	216th Street and 42nd Avenue; 40°45′48″N 73°46′01″W	Bayside	Cemetery with 40–50 graves for the Lawrence family, interred between 1832 and 1925.
Lawrence Family Graveyard		April 19, 1966 (#0136)	20th Road and 35th Street; 40°46′38″N 73°54′20″W	Steinway	Cemetery with 89 graves for the Lawrence family.
Lent-Riker-Smith Homestead	Lent-Riker-Smith Homestead	March 15, 1966 (#0135)	78-03 19th Road; 40°46′23″N 73°53′31″W	Ditmars	New York City's oldest remaining private house used for such purposes. Built in 1729 as a Dutch Colonial farmhouse.: Also on the National Register of Historic Places
Loew's Valencia Theatre		May 29, 1990 (#2036)	165-11 Jamaica Avenue; 40°42′21″N 73°47′40″W	Jamaica	Baroque theater constructed in 1928 as part of the Loew's Wonder Theatres chain.
Lydia Ann Bell and William Ahles House		April 12, 2016 (#2341)	39-24 213th Street; 40°45′51″N 73°46′25″W	Bayside	Second Empire Style house built in 1873 with Colonial Revival alterations in 1924. It is Bayside's only remaining Second Empire house of the 1870s and 1880s.
Marine Air Terminal		November 25, 1980 (#1109)	La Guardia Airport; 40°46′25″N 73°53′10″W	East Elmhurst	Art Deco airport terminal built in 1939–1940, only active airport terminal dating from the first generation of passenger air travel in the United States.: Also on the National Register of Historic Places
Moore-Jackson Cemetery		March 18, 1997 (#1956)	31-34 54th Street; 40°45′22″N 73°54′28″W	Woodside	Cemetery with at least 51 interments from 1733 to 1868. One of New York City's few surviving Colonial-era cemeteries.
Newtown High School	Newtown High School	June 24, 2003 (#2131)	48-01 90th Street; 40°44′27″N 73°52′27″W	Elmhurst	Flemish Renaissance Revival style high school building erected in 1917–1921, with a turreted tower. The designation also includes expansions in 1930–1931 and 1956–1958.
New York Architectural Terra Cotta Works Building		August 24, 1982 (#1304)	42-10 Vernon Boulevard; 40°45′14″N 73°56′59″W	Long Island City	Renaissance and Tudor Revival building constructed in 1892 as the headquarters of the New York Architectural Terra-Cotta Company, the city's sole architectural terracotta manufacturer.
New York State Supreme Court, Queens County, Long Island City Branch	New York State Supreme Court, Queens County, Long Island City Branch	May 11, 1976 (#0925)	25-10 Court Square; 40°44′45″N 73°56′35″W	Long Island City	English Renaissance Revival courthouse dating from 1872–1876, and rebuilt in 1904–1908.: Also on the National Register of Historic Places
Old Saint James Episcopal Church	Old Saint James Episcopal Church	September 19, 2017 (#2593)	86-02 Broadway; 40°44′18″N 73°52′40″W	Elmhurst	Colonial-era church dating from 1735–1736.: Also on the National Register of Historic Places
Paramount Studios, Building No. 1 (Main Building)	Paramount Studios, Building No. 1 (Main Building)	March 14, 1978 (#0977)	35-11 35th Avenue; 40°45′25″N 73°55′28″W	Astoria	Concrete motion-picture studio built in 1920–1921.: Also on the National Register of Historic Places
Pepsi-Cola Sign	Pepsi-Cola Sign	April 12, 2016 (#1653)	4-09 47th Road; 40°44′51″N 73°57′28″W	Long Island City	Electric sign that once advertised Pepsi-Cola's Long Island City bottling facility.
Poppenhusen Institute		August 18, 1970 (#0662)	114-04 14th Road; 40°47′04″N 73°51′12″W	College Point	Italianate and French Second Empire building that served as a village hall, library, and jail.: Also on the National Register of Historic Places
Prospect Cemetery	Prospect Cemetery	January 11, 1977 (#0945)	159th Street and Beaver Road; 40°42′04″N 73°48′01″W	Jamaica	Oldest graveyard in Jamaica, dating from 1665–1670.: Also on the National Register of Historic Places
Public School 48		September 21, 2020 (#2646)	155-02 108th Avenue; 40°41′37″N 73°47′46″W	South Jamaica	Art Deco school designed in 1932.
Public School 66	Public School 66	January 12, 2010 (#2317)	85-11 102nd Street; 40°41′52″N 73°50′47″W	Richmond Hill	Victorian Eclectic, Romanesque Revival, and Queen Anne school built in 1898.: Also on the National Register of Historic Places
Queens Borough Public Library, Poppenhusen Branch	Queens Borough Public Library, Poppenhusen Branch	May 30, 2000 (#2045)	121-23 14th Avenue; 40°47′10″N 73°50′46″W	College Point	Classical-inspired Carnegie library built in 1904, part of the Queens Public Library system.
Queens General Court House		October 26, 2010 (#2404)	88-11 Sutphin Boulevard; 40°42′16″N 73°48′30″W	Jamaica	Modern Classical courthouse constructed in 1936–1939.
Queensboro Bridge		April 16, 1974 (#0828)	Spanning the East River between Queens Plaza, Queens, and East 59th Street, Manhattan; 40°45′20″N 73°57′05″W	Long Island City	Double-decked cantilever bridge to Manhattan, completed in 1909, which helped influence the development of Queens.
Reformed Dutch Church of Newtown and Fellowship Hall	Reformed Dutch Church of Newtown and Fellowship Hall	July 19, 1966 (#0138)	85-15 Broadway; 40°44′21″N 73°52′39″W	Elmhurst	One of New York City's few remaining churches made entirely of wood, built in 1831.: Also on the National Register of Historic Places
The Register/Jamaica Arts Center	The Register/Jamaica Arts Center	November 12, 1974 (#0875)	161-04 Jamaica Avenue; 40°42′14″N 73°47′53″W	Jamaica	Neo-Italian Renaissance building that formerly housed the Queens Register of Titles and Deeds.: Also on the National Register of Historic Places
Remsen Cemetery		May 26, 1981 (#1177)	near 69-43 Trotting Course Lane; 40°42′44″N 73°51′31″W	Rego Park	Private cemetery dating from 1785–1795.
Richmond Hill Republican Club		December 17, 2002 (#2126)	86-15 Lefferts Boulevard; 40°42′03″N 73°49′52″W	Richmond Hill	Colonial Revival clubhouse of the Republican Party, built in 1908.
Ridgewood Savings Bank, Forest Hills Branch	Ridgewood Savings Bank, Forest Hills Branch	May 30, 2000 (#2066)	107-55 Queens Boulevard; 40°43′19″N 73°50′39″W	Forest Hills	First branch of Ridgewood Savings Bank, built in 1939–1940 in the Modern Classical style.
Ridgewood Theatre Building		January 12, 2010 (#2325)	55-27 Myrtle Avenue; 40°42′01″N 73°54′27″W	Ridgewood	Beaux-Arts theater built in 1916.
Edward E. Sanford House	Edward E. Sanford House	February 10, 1987 (#1292)	102-45 47th Avenue; 40°44′44″N 73°51′37″W	Corona	Italianate house built circa 1871.
Herman A. and Malvina Schleicher House		October 20, 2009 (#2321)	11-41 123rd Street; 40°47′12″N 73°50′41″W	College Point	Italianate and French Second Empire mansion built in 1857, and one of New York City's first buildings with mansard roofs.
St. George's Church	St. George's Church	February 8, 2002 (#2053)	38-02 Main Street; 40°45′37″N 73°49′52″W	Flushing	Gorthic Revival church built in 1853–1854.: Also on the National Register of Historic Places as a National Historic Landmark
St. Monica's Church	St. Monica's Church	March 13, 1979 (#1017)	94-20 160th Street; 40°42′07″N 73°47′53″W	Jamaica	Romanesque church built in 1856 with a central entrance tower.: Also on the National Register of Historic Places
Sidewalk Clock, 161-11 Jamaica Avenue	Sidewalk Clock, 161-11 Jamaica Avenue	August 25, 1981 (#1176)	92-00a Union Hall Street; 40°42′15″N 73°47′53″W	Jamaica	Classical cast-iron clock made circa 1900.: This building was originally designated as a landmark with the address 161-11 Jamaica Avenue. In 1989, it was moved across the street.; Also on the National Register of Historic Places
Sidewalk Clock, 30-78 Steinway Street	Sidewalk Clock, 30-78 Steinway Street	August 25, 1981 (#1174)	30-78 Steinway Street; 40°45′43″N 73°55′00″W	Astoria	Classical cast-iron clock made circa 1922 for Edward Wagner, owner of the Wagners Jewelers store.
Sohmer and Company Piano Factory		February 27, 2005 (#2172)	31-01 Vernon Boulevard; 40°46′10″N 73°56′07″W	Astoria	German Romanesque Revival factory for Sohmer & Co., built in 1886.: Also on the National Register of Historic Places
Steinway Mansion/Benjamin T. Pike House	Steinway Mansion/Benjamin T. Pike House	February 15, 1967 (#0632)	18-33 41st Street; 40°46′44″N 73°53′49″W	Steinway	Residence of piano maker William Steinway, an Italianate villa built circa 1858.: Also on the National Register of Historic Places
Suffolk Title and Guarantee Company Building		March 6, 2001 (#2088)	90-04 161st Street; 40°42′19″N 73°47′59″W	Jamaica	Art Deco building erected in 1929.
Trans World Airlines Flight Center/TWA Terminal A	Trans World Airlines Flight Center/TWA Terminal A	July 19, 1994 (#1915)	John F. Kennedy International Airport; 40°38′45″N 73°46′39″W	Jamaica	Concrete and glass terminal built for Trans World Airlines between 1956 and 1962.: Also on the National Register of Historic Places
Unisphere and Reflecting Pool	Unisphere and Reflecting Pool	May 16, 1995 (#1925)	Inside Flushing Meadows–Corona Park; 40°44′47″N 73°50′41″W	Flushing Meadows–Corona Park	Steel globe built as an icon of the 1964 New York World's Fair.
Cornelius Van Wyck House		April 19, 1966 (#0144)	37-04 Douglaston Parkway; 40°46′24″N 73°45′09″W	Douglaston	Dutch Colonial house built in 1735, one of New York City's few remaining Dutch Colonial houses.: Also on the National Register of Historic Places, and overlaid by the Douglaston Historic District
Voelker Orth Museum Bird Sanctuary and Victorian Garden	Voelker Orth Museum Bird Sanctuary and Victorian Garden	October 30, 2007 (#2272)	149-19 38th Avenue; 40°45′53″N 73°48′58″W	Murray Hill	One of a few remaining houses from Flushing's first major suburban developments, built in 1891 for businessman Conrad Voelker.
Weeping Beech	Weeping Beech	April 19, 1966 (#0142)	Weeping Beech Park, 37th Avenue between Parsons Boulevard and Bowne Street; 40°45′49″N 73°49′27″W	Flushing	Weeping beech planted by Samuel Parsons in 1847; the original tree was euthanized in 1999.

== Interior landmarks ==
Landmark name	Image	Date listed	Location	Neighborhood	Description
King Manor (first floor interior)	King Manor (first floor interior)	March 23, 1976 (#0923)	150th Street and Jamaica Avenue; 40°42′11″N 73°48′14″W	Jamaica	The first floor of King Manor (an exterior landmark and National Historic Landmark) with features in the Georgian and Federal styles.
Marine Air Terminal (main floor interior)	Marine Air Terminal (main floor interior)	November 25, 1980 (#1110)	La Guardia Airport; 40°46′25″N 73°53′10″W	East Elmhurst	The Modernist style main floor of the Marine Air Terminal (an exterior landmark and National Registered Historic Place), which contains a mural and circular main room.
RKO Keith's Flushing Theater (ground level interior)	RKO Keith's Flushing Theater (ground level interior)	February 28, 1984 (#1257)	135-27 to 135-45 Northern Boulevard; 40°45′48″N 73°49′57″W	Flushing	Interior space of a Baroque theater built in 1927–1928 for the RKO Pictures chain.: Also on the National Register of Historic Places; however, the exterior is not a city landmark.
Trans World Airlines Flight Center/TWA Terminal A (ground, main, and balcony level interior)	Trans World Airlines Flight Center/TWA Terminal A (ground, main, and balcony level interior)	July 19, 1994 (#1916)	John F. Kennedy International Airport; 40°38′45″N 73°46′39″W	Jamaica	The public spaces of the TWA Flight Center (an exterior landmark and National Registered Historic Place), which consists of a central space spanned by a balcony, as well as two passageways called "flight tubes".

== Former landmarks ==
Landmark name	Image	Date listed	Date removed	Location	Neighborhood	Description
Grace Episcopal Memorial Hall		October 26, 2010 (#2394)	January 18, 2011	155-24 90th Avenue; 40°42′16″N 73°48′05″W	Jamaica	Memorial hall built in the Tudor Gothic style in 1912, behind Grace Episcopal Church.: The New York City Council voted down landmark status due to opposition from the church.
Jamaica Savings Bank, Queens Boulevard	Jamaica Savings Bank, Queens Boulevard	June 28, 2005 (#2173)	October 20, 2005	89-01 Queens Boulevard; 40°44′06″N 73°52′26″W	Elmhurst	Jamaica Savings Bank building with an elongated-saddle roof, built in 1966–1968.: The New York City Council voted down landmark status.
Loew's Triboro Theater		July 23, 1974 (#0870)	1974	Steinway Street & 28th Avenue; 40°45′56″N 73°54′49″W	Astoria	Neo-Aztec theater constructed in 1930.: The New York City Board of Estimate voted down landmark status, and it was demolished.
Sidewalk Clock, 36-34 Main Street		August 25, 1981 (#1175)	1982	36-34 Main Street; 40°45′44″N 73°49′54″W	Flushing	Classical cast-iron clock made circa 1920 for Henry B. Conovitz.: The landmark designation was rescinded and the clock was removed.

== See also ==
- List of New York City Landmarks
