= Allmendinger =

Allmendinger is a German surname. Notable people with the surname include:

- A. J. Allmendinger (born 1981), American racing driver
- Ernest Allmendinger (1890–1973), American football player
- Jutta Allmendinger (born 1956), German social scientist
- Karl Allmendinger (1891–1965), German World War II general
- Louis Allmendinger (1875–1937), American architect
