= Voelker Orth Museum =

Museum in Queens, New York

- Voelker Orth Museum, Bird Sanctuary, and Victorian Garden
- U.S. National Register of Historic Places
- New York State Register of Historic Places
- New York City Landmark
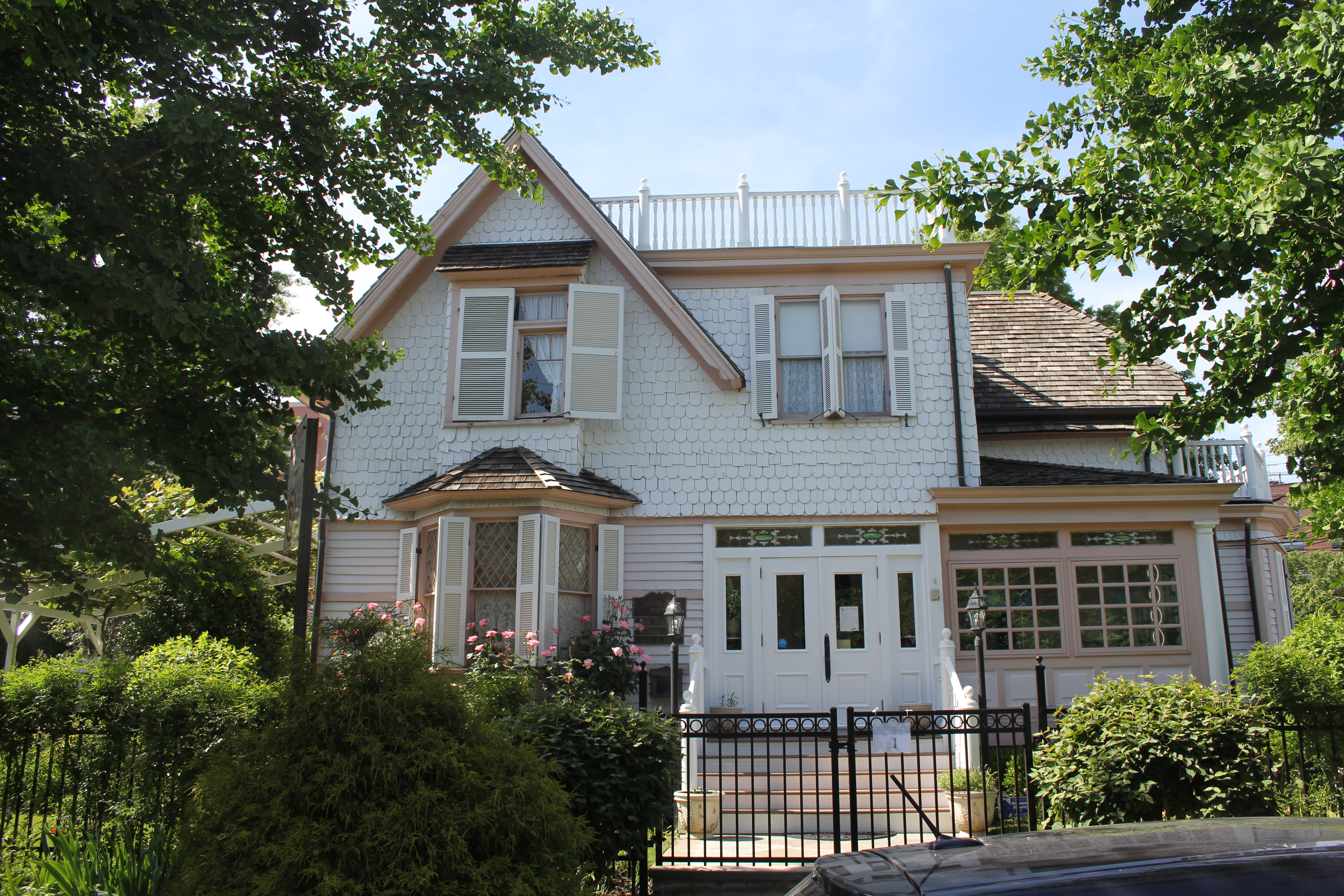
- Voelker Orth house from 38th Avenue
- Location: 149-19 38th Ave. Flushing, Queens, New York, United States
- Coordinates: 40.764618°N 73.816114°W
- Built: c. 1891
- Website: www.vomuseum.org
- NRHP reference No.: 100005569
- NYSRHP No.: 08101.013196
- NYCL No.: 2272

Significant dates
- Added to NRHP: September 18, 2020
- Designated NYSRHP: June 16, 2020
- Designated NYCL: October 30, 2007

The Voelker Orth Museum, Bird Sanctuary and Victorian Garden is a museum at 149-19 38th Avenue in the Murray Hill neighborhood of Queens in New York City. In addition to preserving a German immigrant family's 1890s home and garden, the Voelker Orth Museum offers house tours, temporary exhibitions, concerts, lectures and workshops, cultural festivals, and family and school programs. Its mission is to "preserve and interpret the cultural and horticultural heritage of Flushing, Queens and adjacent communities to engage their ever-changing populations, through the experience of an immigrant family’s 1890s home." The property was listed on the National Register of Historic Places in 2020.

== Description ==
The museum occupies a two-story house that was constructed in 1891 by a local businessman, James Bouton. It was built as an investment two years after the Long Island Rail Road opened the Murray Hill railway station nearby. The house was then purchased in 1899 by a German immigrant named Conrad Voelcker, who moved in with his wife Elizabeth and infant daughter Theresa. After Voelcker's death in 1930, the house became the home of his daughter, Theresa Voelker (later generations spelled the name without the 'c') and her husband, Dr. Rudolph Orth. Their daughter, Elisabetha Orth, who lived in the house most of her life, established the organization which now runs the museum in her will. When the Museum was incorporated, extensive restoration of the property was undertaken prior to opening in 2003. Photographs of the house from the early 1900s provided a reference for Graf & Lewent, the restoration architects. Period rooms incorporated the Orth family furnishings from the 1930s. The property was designated a New York City Landmark in 2007.

=== Victorian garden ===
A distinguishing feature of the museum is the Victorian garden, which is maintained using eighteenth century propagation methods and gardening techniques, such as hand pruning and the use of natural fertilizers and pesticides. Serving as a bird sanctuary, the garden's many varieties of berry bushes and trees attract wild birds, most commonly sparrows, mockingbirds, and robins, cardinals, and blue jays. The museum also operates a bee hive, from which honey is harvested to use in educational programs and sell in their gift shop. In 2005, the Voelker Orth Museum Garden won the Long Island Nurserymen's and Landscapers Association's 2005 Gold Award.

== Family history ==
Conrad Voelcker was born in Edenkoben, Germany and immigrated to the United States in 1881, when he was nineteen years old. He established a printing business and German language newspaper, Der Pfälzer in Amerika, in 1884. After living in Manhattan, New Jersey, and Brooklyn, Conrad eventually moved to the Murray Hill area of Flushing, Queens, where he purchased a house. A few years prior, Conrad had married Elizabeth Maibach. Their first and only daughter, Theresa, was about a year old at the time of the move. In moving to Flushing, Conrad Voelcker was bringing his family to what was then an attractive suburb of Manhattan with a relatively short commute to work. Voelcker continued selling his newspaper Der Pfalzer in Amerika until around the time the United States entered World War I in 1917, probably due to Anti-German sentiment. Voelcker retired from the printing business in 1925, and his nephew Carl S. Voelcker became the president and treasurer of the company.

Conrad's daughter Theresa married Dr. Rudolph Orth, a graduate of Cornell University Medical School and World War I veteran. Their first daughter, Elisabetha “Betty” Orth, was born in 1926. In 1935 they adopted a nine-year-old girl, whom they renamed Barbara. Elisabetha Orth graduated from New York University in 1948, majoring in English Literature. She then attended the University of Texas, where she received a master's degree in Theater. Elisabetha lived with her mother in the family home for many years after her father's death in 1948. Barbara married Thomas Lipera and moved to Long Island; she now lives in Florida. Theresa Orth died in 1992, and Elisabetha died three years later in 1995 of injuries resulting from an automobile accident. In her will, Elisabetha Orth bequeathed the establishment of the Voelker Orth Museum as an educational resource.

== Gallery ==
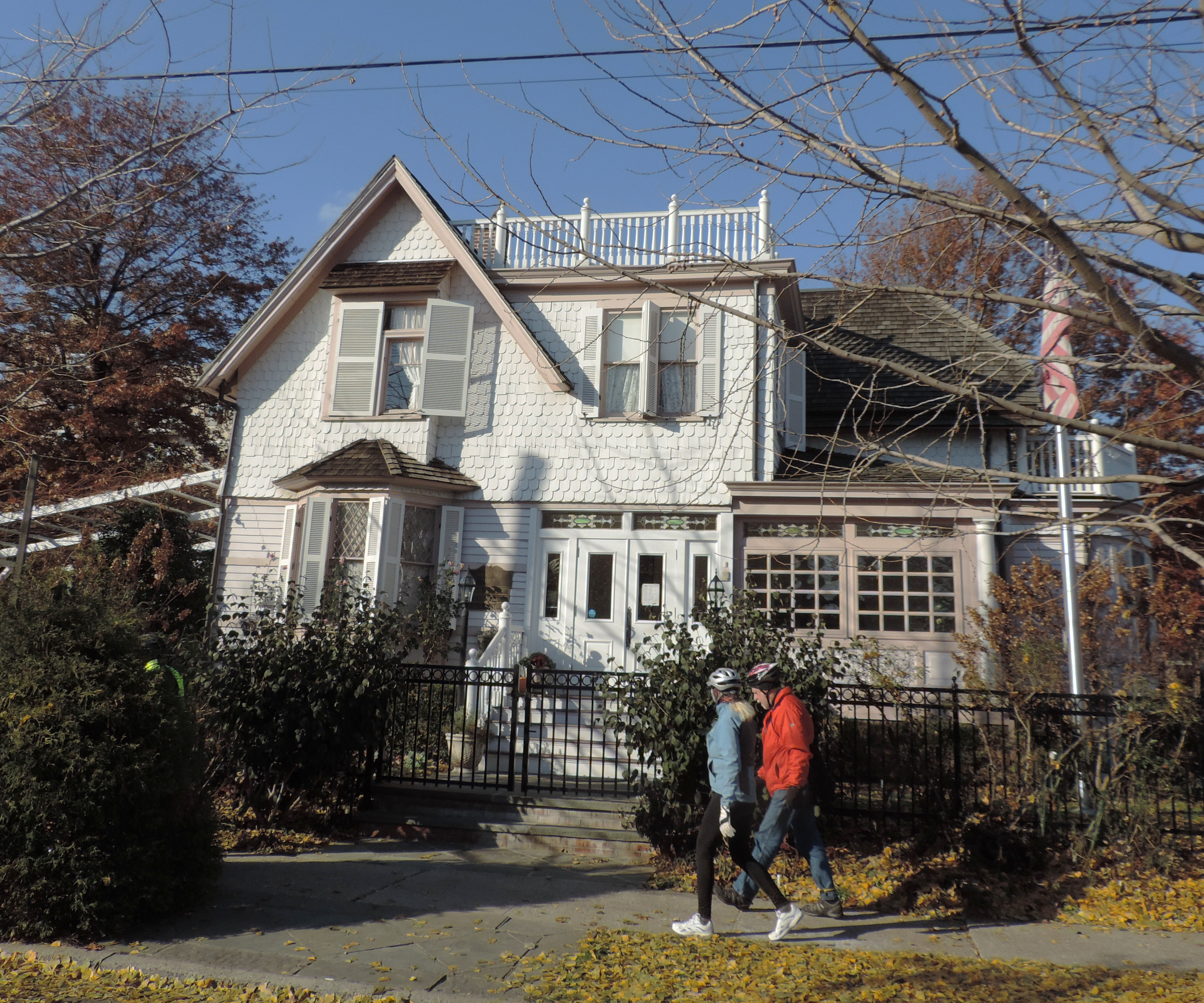
South facade from 38th Avenue

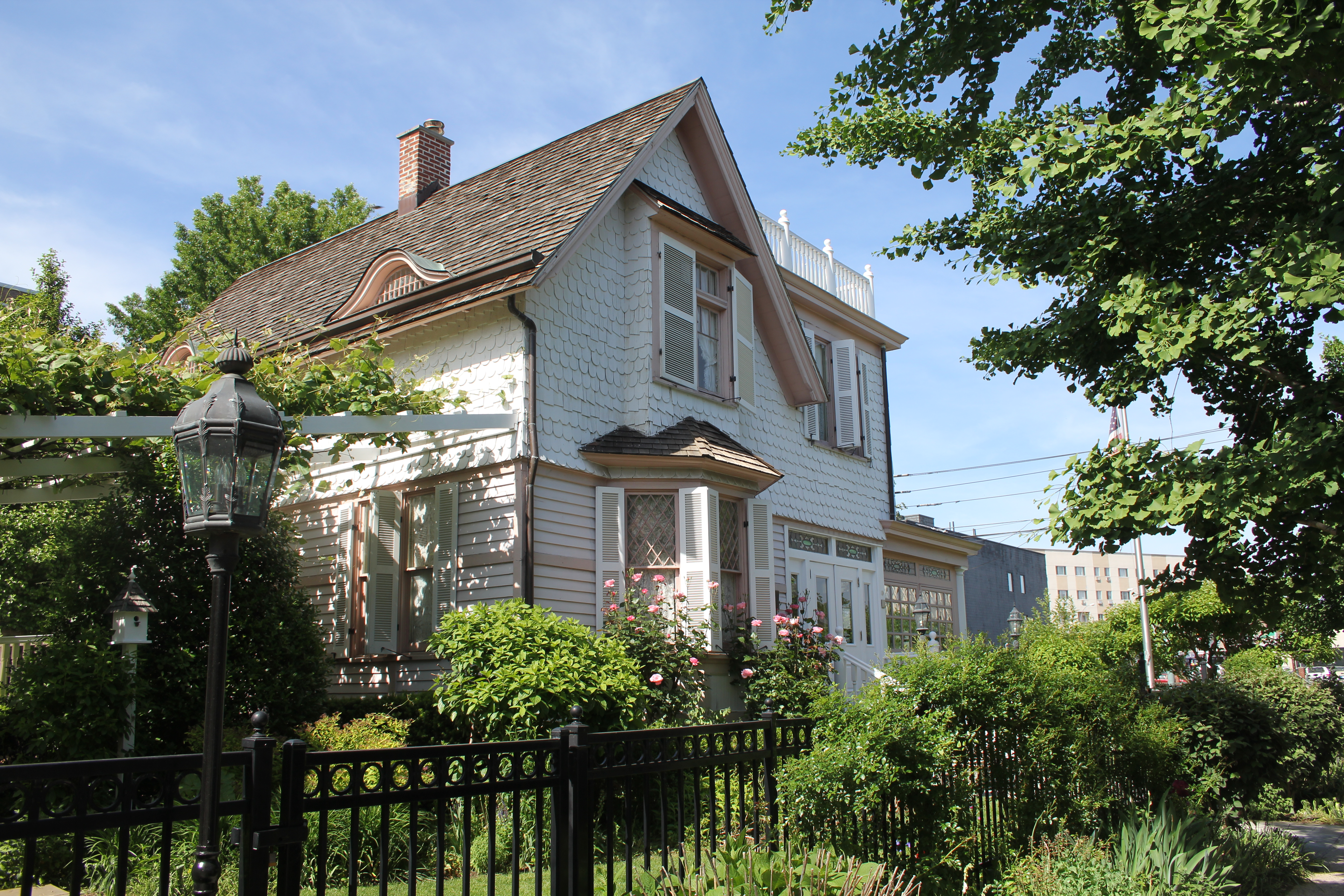
From southwest of the house

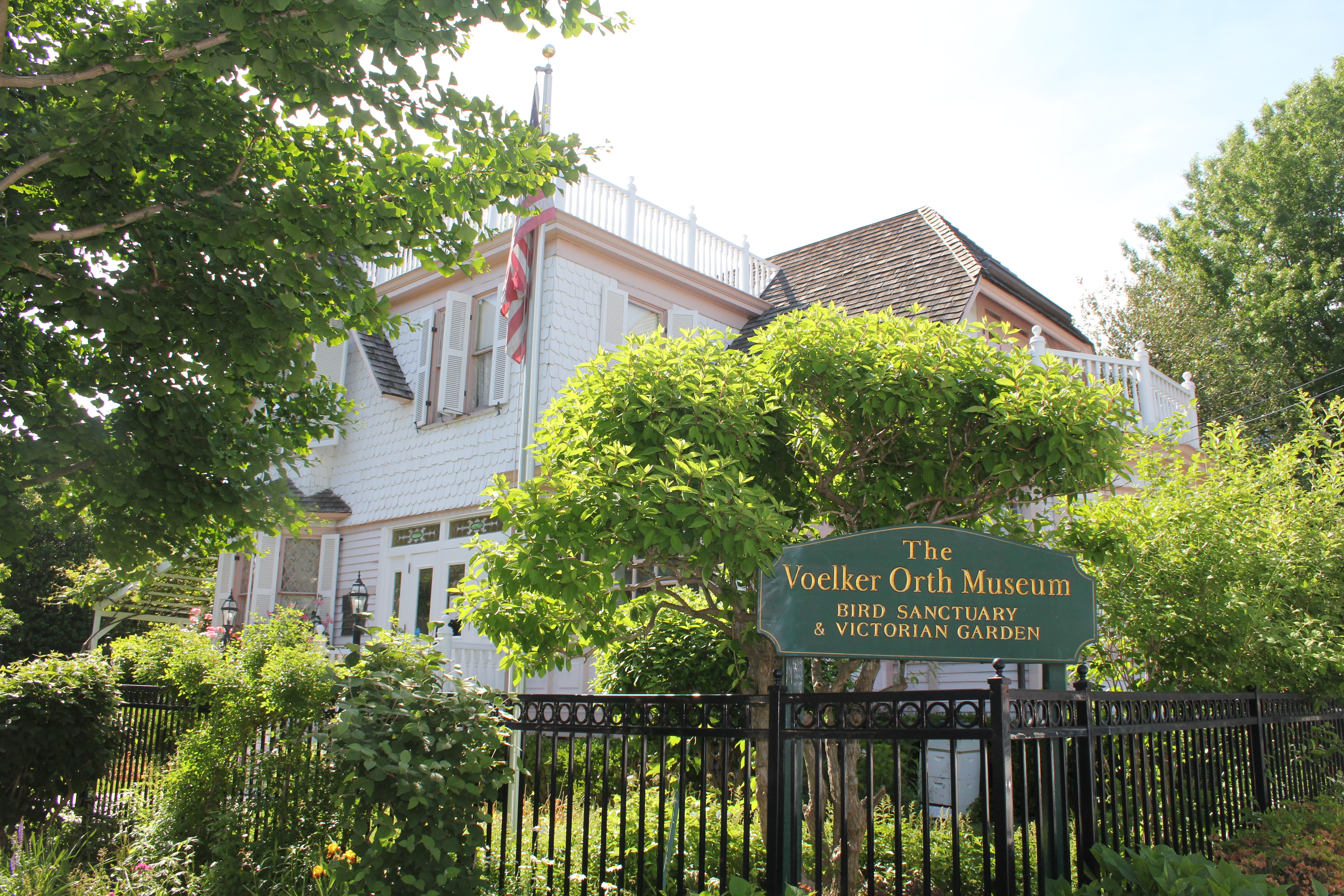
From southeast of the house

== See also ==
- List of New York City Designated Landmarks in Queens
- National Register of Historic Places listings in Queens
