= Russian Orthodox Cathedral of the Transfiguration of Our Lord =

Church in Brooklyn, New York

- U.S. National Register of Historic Places
- New York City Landmark
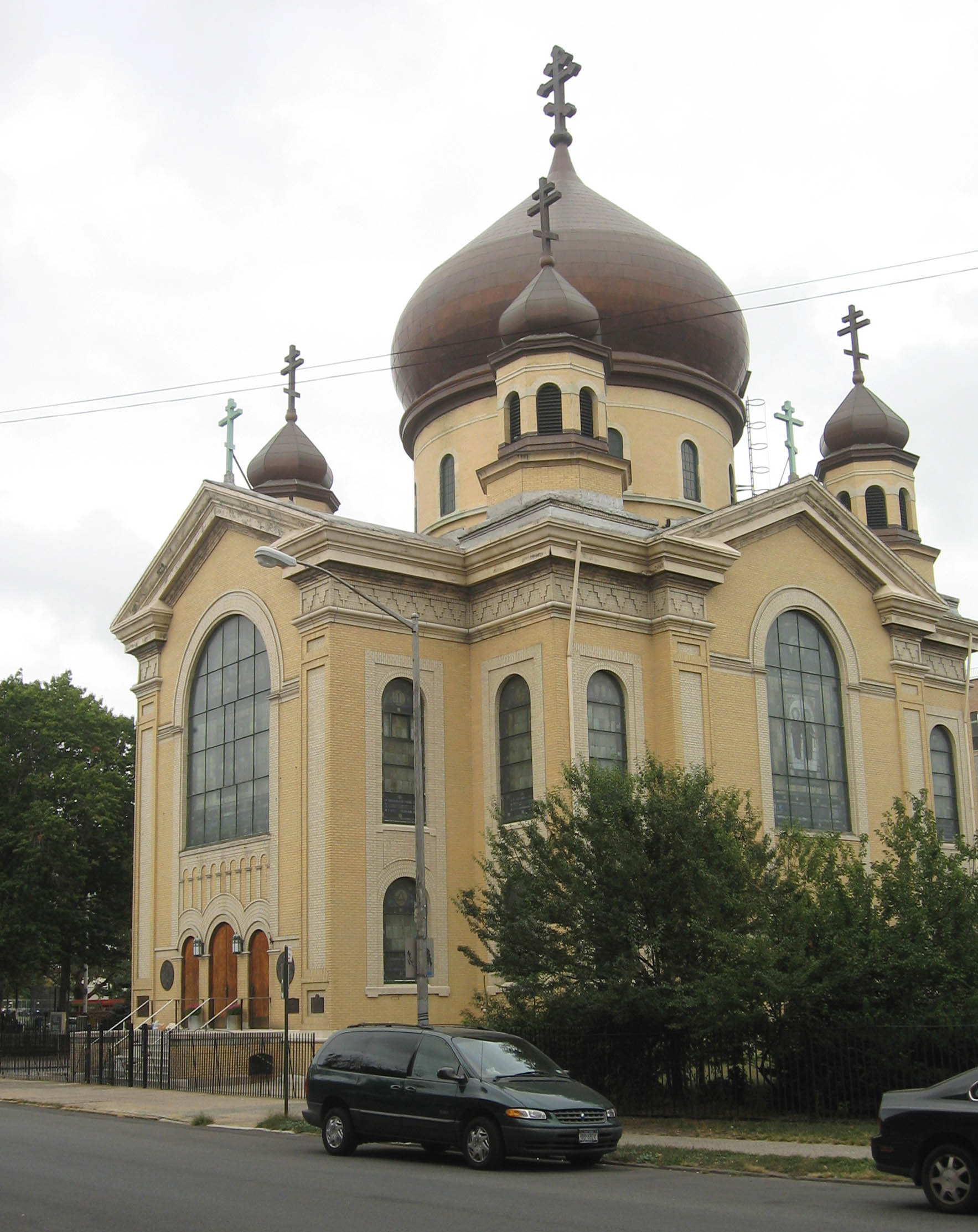
- (2007)

- Location within New York City
- Location: 228 North 12th Street; Brooklyn, New York City
- Coordinates: 40°43′10″N 73°57′13″W
- Built: 1916-1921
- Architect: Louis Allmendiger
- Architectural style: Russian Byzantine
- NRHP reference No.: 80002638

Significant dates
- Added to NRHP: April 16, 1980
- Designated NYCL: November 19, 1969

Russian Orthodox Cathedral of the Transfiguration of Our Lord is a historic Russian Orthodox cathedral at 228 North 12th Street in the Williamsburg neighborhood of Brooklyn, New York City. The cathedral was designated a New York City landmark by the Landmarks Preservation Commission in 1969, and was listed on the National Register of Historic Places in 1980.

== History and description ==
The cathedral was built from 1916 to 1921 and was designed by Louis Allmendiger. The plan is based on a Greek cross and is designed in the Russian version of the Byzantine style, but with a Renaissance flavor. The building features characteristic copper Onion domes atop four octagonal belfries and a large central copper-covered dome. Each dome is topped by a large, gilded Russian Orthodox cross.

The building's facade is constructed from yellow bricks with a small amount of trim made from stone. The windows and doors are primarily round-arched, with stairs leading to the front entrance.

== In popular culture ==
Exterior shots of the cathedral were used in the Seinfeld episode "The Conversion" where it represented a fictionalized version of a Latvian Orthodox church.

== See also ==
- List of New York City Designated Landmarks in Brooklyn
- National Register of Historic Places listings in Kings County, New York
