= Remsen Cemetery =

Private cemetery in Queens, New York

Coordinates: 40°42′44″N 73°51′30″W

- Interactive map of Remsen Cemetery

Details
- Established: 1790s
- Location: 69-43 Trotting Course Lane, Queens, New York
- Country: United States
- Type: Private

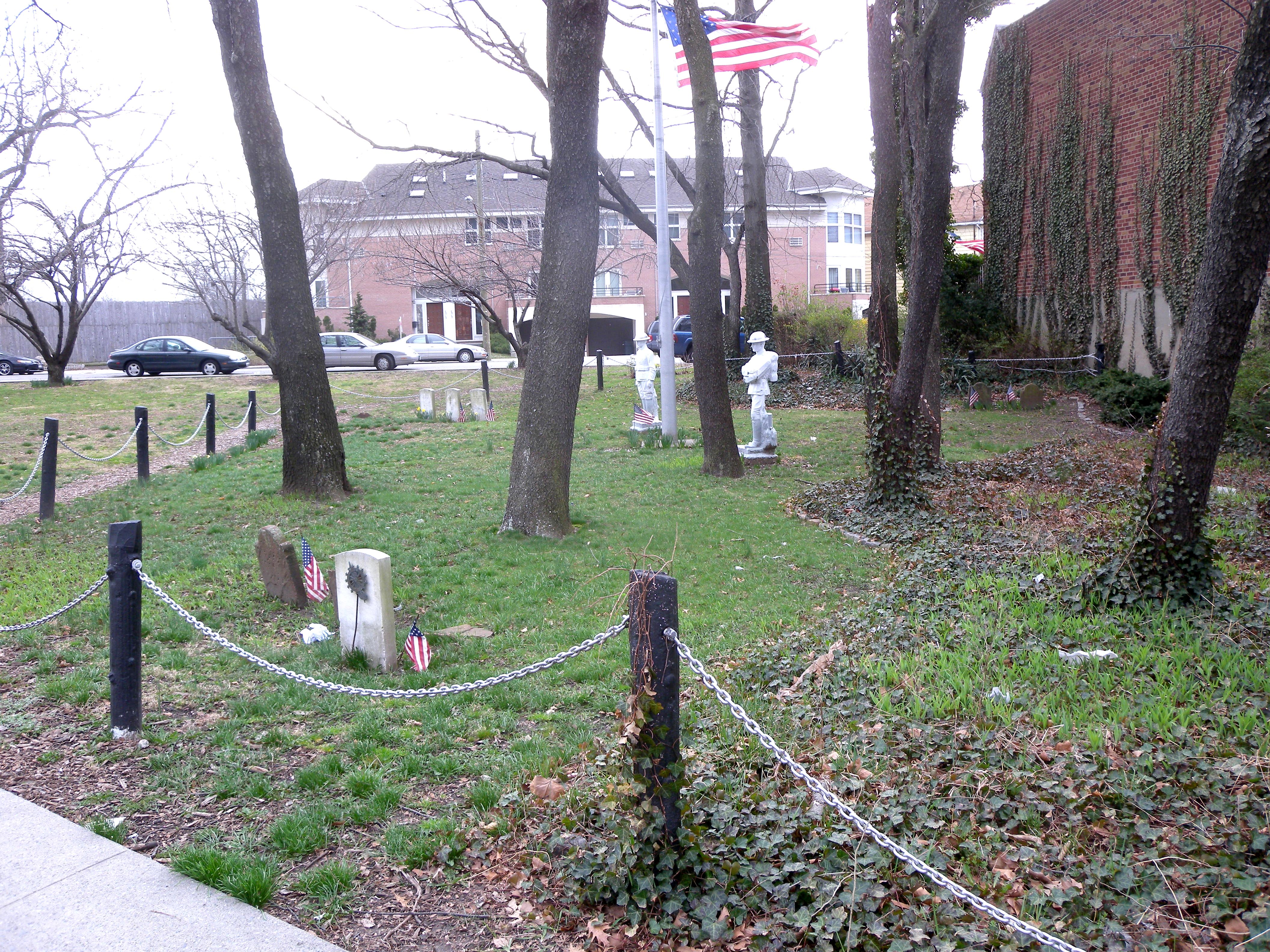
Looking west toward Trotting Course Lane

The Remsen Cemetery is a private burial ground at 69-43 Trotting Course Lane, bordering the Middle Village and Rego Park neighborhoods of Queens in New York City. The cemetery is on a 2.5-acre (1.0 ha) triangle just north of Metropolitan Avenue and one block east of Woodhaven Boulevard. The Remsen Cemetery contains the remains of members of the Remsen family who died between 1790 and the early 19th century. The burials in the cemetery include that of American Revolutionary War colonel Jeromus Remsen (1735–1790), as well as his wife, his brother, and four of his children. The remains of an eighth person, Bridget Remsen, are also in the cemetery.

In the 20th century, commemorative military gravestones were placed there by the Veterans Administration, and memorials to World War I soldiers were erected in the cemetery. By the late 20th century, the cemetery was rundown, despite efforts by nearby landowners to keep it maintained. The New York City Landmarks Preservation Commission designated the Remsen Family Cemetery as a landmark in 1981, and the local American Legion post took over maintenance of the cemetery around the same time. During the first decade of the 21st century, the burial ground came under the administration of the New York City Department of Parks and Recreation (NYC Parks).

== Site and burials ==
The cemetery is on a 2.5-acre (1.0 ha) triangle at 69-43 Trotting Course Lane, just north of Metropolitan Avenue and one block east of Woodhaven Boulevard, at the border of Middle Village and Rego Park in the New York City borough of Queens. It is bounded to the west by Trotting Course Lane, the east by Alderton Street, and the north by private residences. It is one of a few private burial grounds remaining on Long Island. The surrounding area was settled in the 17th century by English and Dutch farmers, as the land was good for growing hay, rye, corn, straw, oats and green vegetables. During the colonial days, only a few roads cut through the marsh including Whitepot Road, now replaced by local streets. The only known existing remnant of Whitepot is the Remsen Family Cemetery.

The Remsens immigrated from northern Germany in the 17th century under Rem Jansen Van der Beeck, whose sons took the Remsen surname. One son, Abraham, settled near Hempstead Swamp (now Middle Village) and helped clear the swamp around 1712 before building an estate there. Abraham Remsen's grandson, Jeromus Remsen Jr., was an American Revolutionary War colonel who lived from 1735 to 1790. (Note: Colonel Jeromus was the second member of his immediate family to bear the name. His father, Abraham's son, was also named Jeromus. The colonel's son, Jeromus the third, is also buried in the cemetery.) Jeromus was recorded by the Continental Congress of 1774 as a leadership figure in New Towne, and was a clerk and member of the Queens County committee. During the Revolutionary War, he was colonel for half of the Kings and Queens county militias and sent to join the brigade of general Nathanael Greene in the Battle of Brooklyn by general George Washington. In 1768, Jeromus married Anna Rapelje (died 1816). (Note: Also variously spelled "Ann") They had seven children, of which three boys lived to adulthood.

The cemetery was originally between the Remsen family's house and the Suydam family's homestead, both now demolished. The cemetery was used to bury Remsen family members from 1790 until the 19th century, with brownstone tombstones dating through at least 1819. A survey in 1925 found inscriptions for eight family members: Jeromus and Anna; four of their children; Jeromus's brother Major Abraham Remsen (1730–1807, Major, Cooper's Regiment, New York Militia); and Bridget Remsen, whose connection to the rest of the family was undetermined. The Remsen estate had been sold off for development by the late 19th century.

== Later history ==
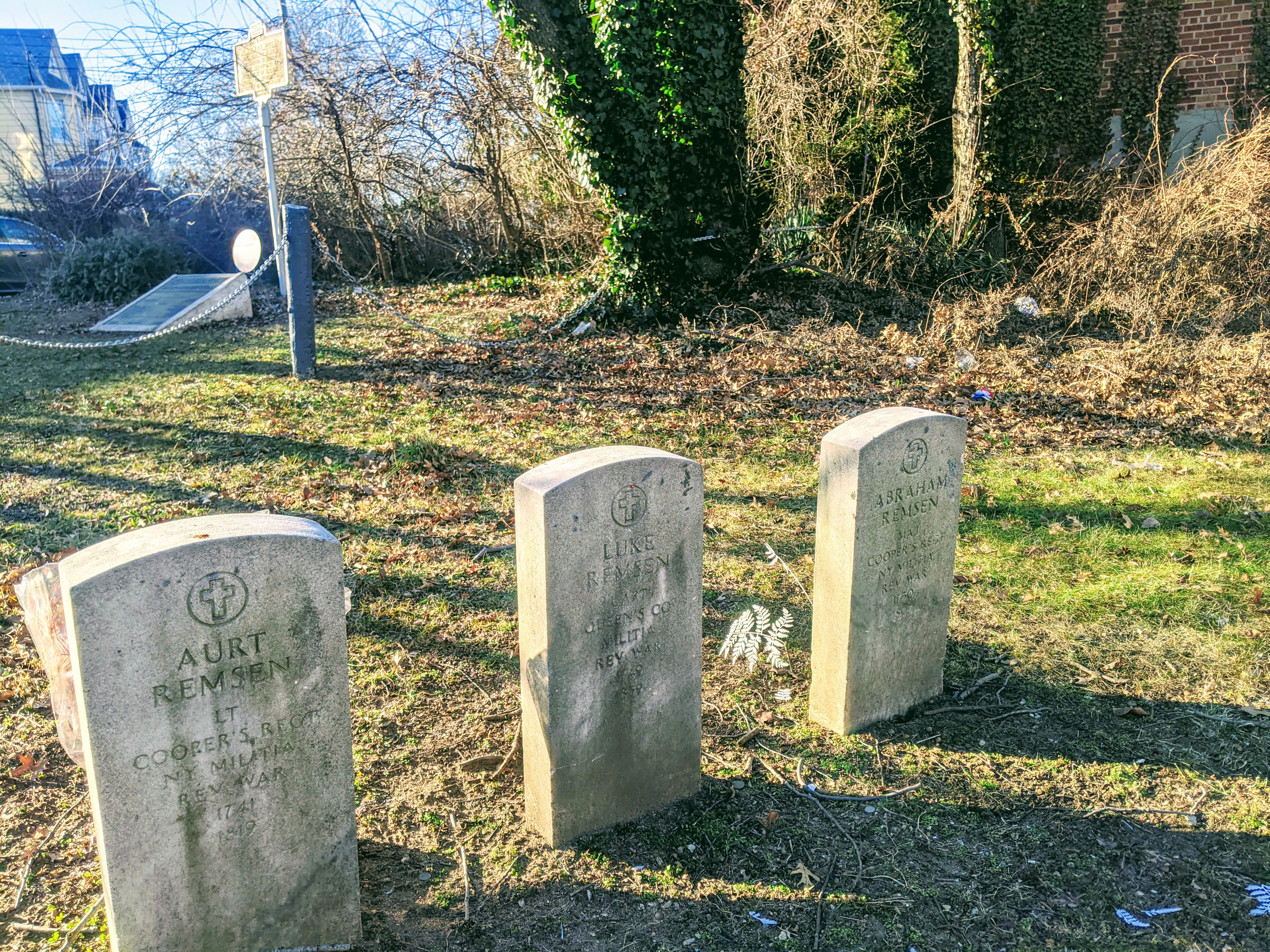
Remsen Cemetery VA Gravestones

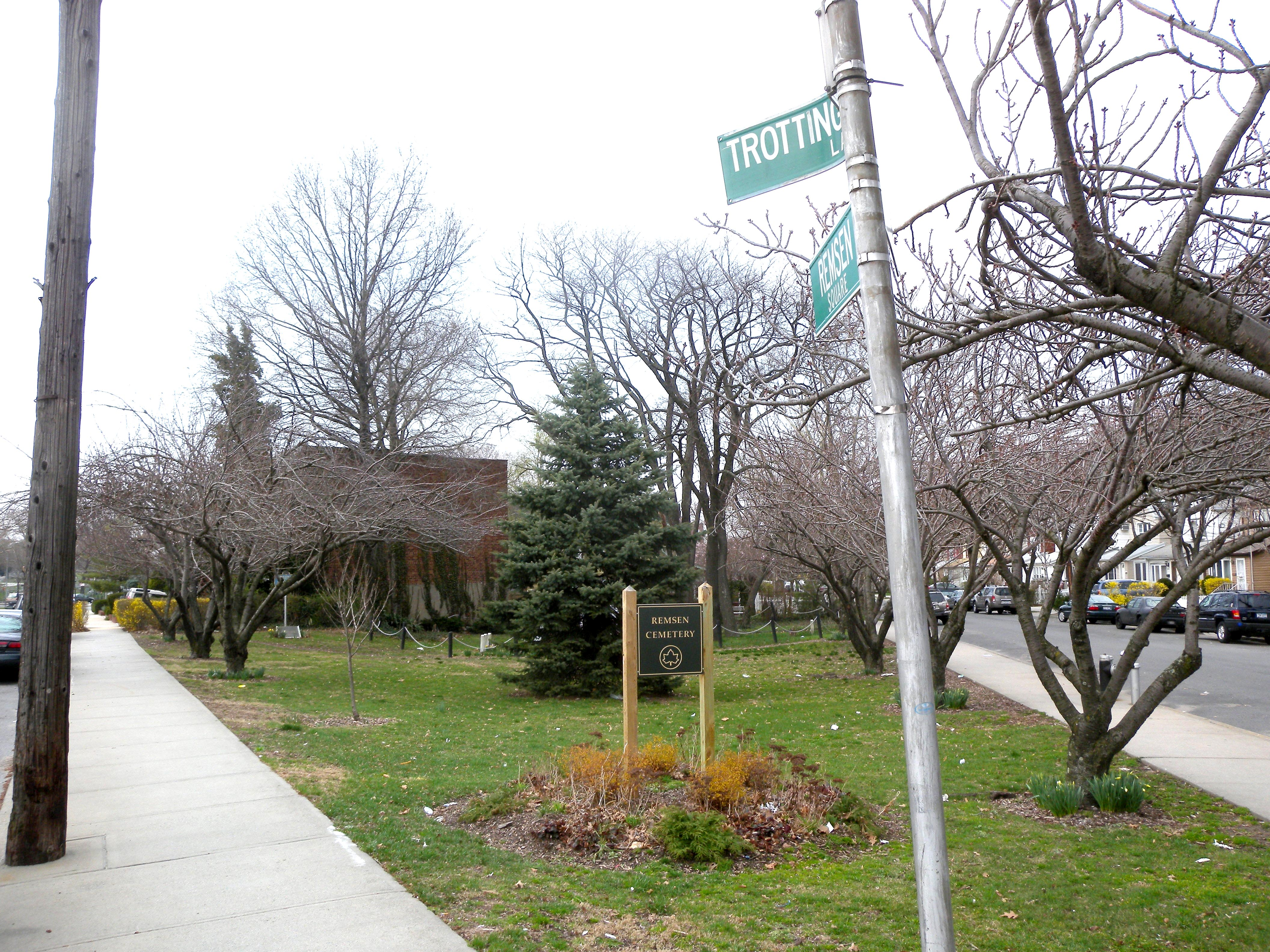
Looking north from Trotting Course Lane and Alderton Street

In the early 20th century, commemorative military gravestones were placed there by the Veterans Administration in honor of two Remsen family members. Memorials were also placed in honor of two brothers who also served in the Revolutionary War: Aurt Remsen (1741–1819, Lieutenant, Cooper's Regiment, New York Militia) and Garrett (Luke) Remsen, (1749–1839, Captain, Queen's Company Militia). A memorial to community members who fought in World War I was also installed in the cemetery. A guidebook in 1923 described the cemetery as having only a few headstones, including that of colonel Jeromus. The Remsen residence was demolished in 1925, and residential developments were built on the surrounding land. However, the cemetery remained undeveloped, as no one came forward to claim ownership. At the time, the last recorded land deed had taken place in 1806, and taxes had not been paid on the land since 1897.

Neighborhood residents commenced efforts to beautify the cemetery in 1935. By the late 20th century, the cemetery was rundown, despite efforts by nearby landowners to keep it maintained. In response, in 1978, the Native New Yorkers' Historical Association and the local American Legion post agreed to collaborate to improve the plot, with help from two historians who had maintained small cemeteries in Brooklyn and the Bronx. The American Legion post, which was in a building adjacent to the cemetery, took over maintenance. Shortly thereafter it was renamed Remsen Memorial Square and was cleaned up. New gravestone markers were constructed in 1980. The cemetery was designated a landmark by the New York City Landmarks Preservation Commission in 1981. The Remsen Park Coalition, led by Joseph E. Devoy (1926–2000), had advocated for the designation of Remsen Cemetery. The Thomas X. Winberry Garden was subsequently planted at the southern end of the cemetery, at the corner of Trotting Course Lane and Alderton Street.

In 2003, the New York City Department of Parks and Recreation (NYC Parks) took control of a portion of the cemetery, covering 1.6 acres (0.65 ha). Two years later, NYC Parks proposed taking over the remaining area from the American Legion. However, local residents opposed giving NYC Parks total control of the parcel, citing that the city government had neglected the parcel. Despite the opposition, the $50,000 sale was nearly completed by 2008. NYC Parks planned to build a 4-foot-tall (1.2 m) fence around the plot, replacing the short chain-loop fence. The Forest Hills Community and Civic Association wished to spend $10,000 to install protective cases over the tombstones, though this was rejected by state officials.

== See also ==
- List of New York City Designated Landmarks in Queens
