= J. Kurtz and Sons Store Building =

Historic commercial building in Queens, New York

- U.S. National Register of Historic Places
- New York City Landmark
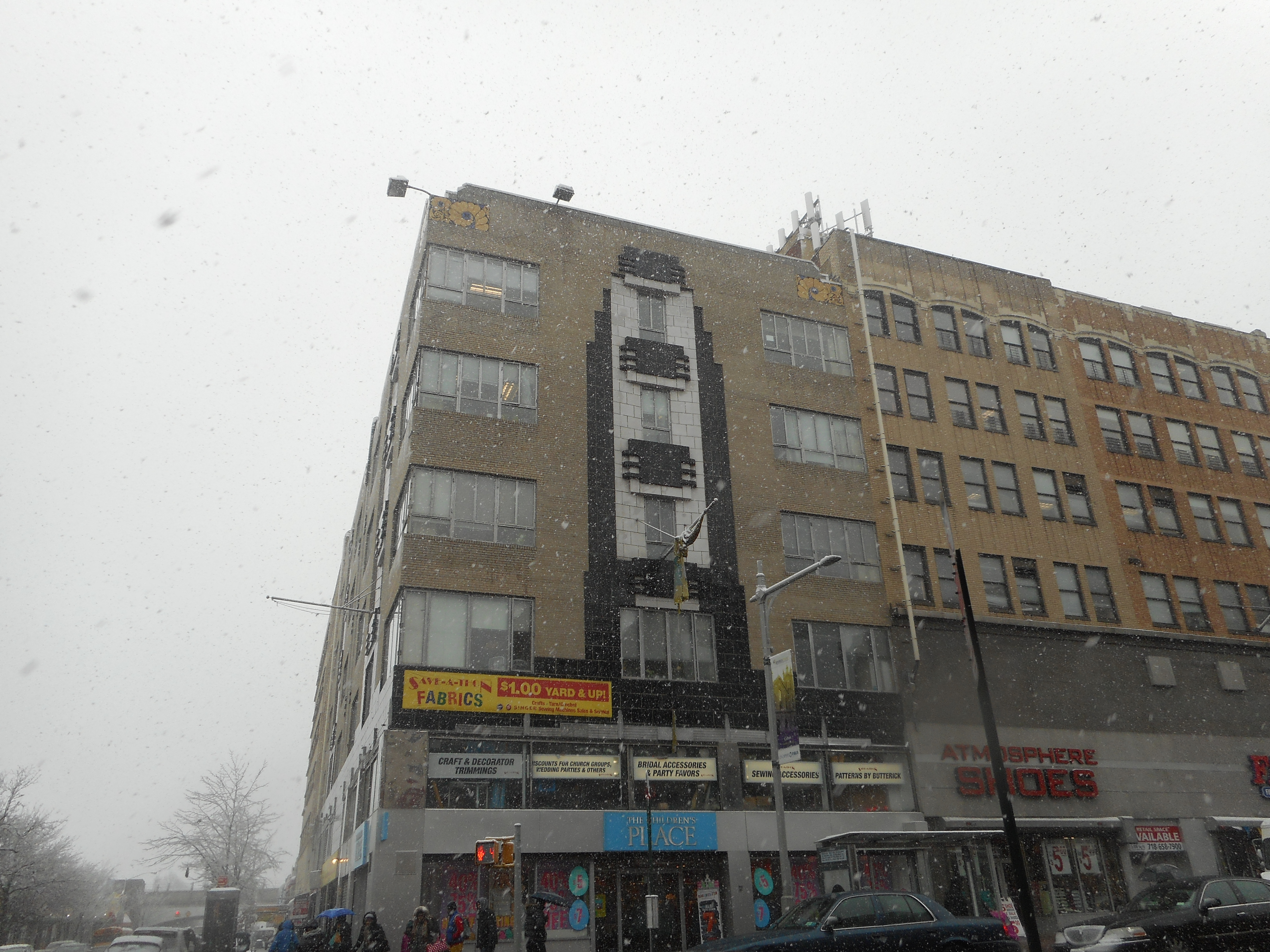
- Seen on a snowy March day in 2017

- Location within New York City Location within New York Location within the United States
- Location: 162-24 Jamaica Ave., Queens, New York
- Coordinates: 40°42′15.6″N 73°47′49″W
- Area: less than one acre
- Built: 1931
- Architect: Allmendinger & Schlendorf
- Architectural style: Art Deco
- NRHP reference No.: 83001775
- NYCL No.: 1132

Significant dates
- Added to NRHP: September 8, 1983
- Designated NYCL: November 24, 1981

J. Kurtz and Sons Store Building is a historic commercial building in the Jamaica neighborhood of Queens in New York City. It was built in 1931 and is a six-story, steel-frame building with two decorated sides in the Art Deco style. It is three bays by six bays and features a metal-framed windows with stepped pylon motif rising through all four floors. They are of cast aluminum with geometric designs. It was built to house a franchise of the J. Kurtz and Sons furniture store, founded by Jacob Kurtz in 1870.

It was designated as a New York City Landmark in 1981, and listed on the National Register of Historic Places in 1983. Today it is a local The Children's Place franchise, as well as other local shops and an office for the New York City Department of Probation.

== See also ==
- List of New York City Designated Landmarks in Queens
- National Register of Historic Places listings in Queens County, New York
