= Queens County Farm Museum =

Museum in Queens, New York

- Cornell Farmhouse
- U.S. National Register of Historic Places
- New York City Landmark
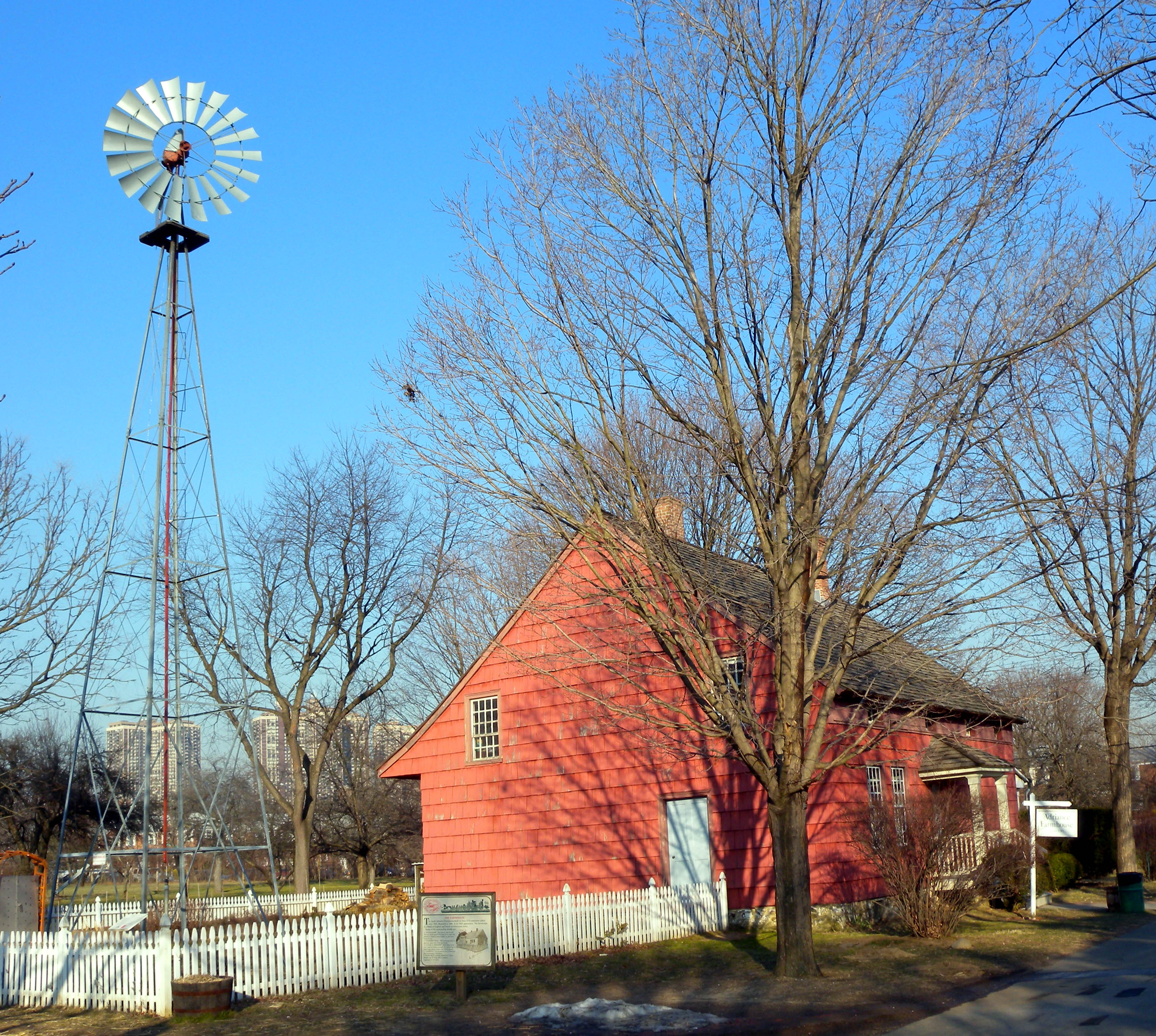
- The Jacob and Catherine Adriance Farmhouse
- Location: 73-50 Little Neck Parkway; Queens, New York 11004
- Coordinates: 40°44′54″N 73°43′13″W
- Built: 1750
- Architectural style: Greek Revival, Colonial, Dutch Colonial
- NRHP reference No.: 79001620
- NYCL No.: 0941

Significant dates
- Added to NRHP: July 24, 1979
- Designated NYCL: November 9, 1976

The Queens County Farm Museum, also known as Queens Farm, is a 47-acre (190,000 m^{2}) farm in the Glen Oaks neighborhood of Queens in New York City. The farm occupies the city's largest remaining tract of undisturbed farmland (in operation since 1697), and is still a working farm today. Queens Farm practices sustainable agriculture and has a four-season growing program. The museum includes the Adriance Farmhouse (also known as the Cornell Farmhouse), a New York City Landmark on the National Register of Historic Places.

The site features restored farm buildings, planting fields with 200 types of crops, livestock, and various examples of vintage farm equipment. The museum has free admission on most days, though tickets are sold for special event days throughout the year. The museum hosts guided tours of the farmhouse, weekend hayrides, and an on-site seasonal farmstand.

== Cornell Farmhouse ==
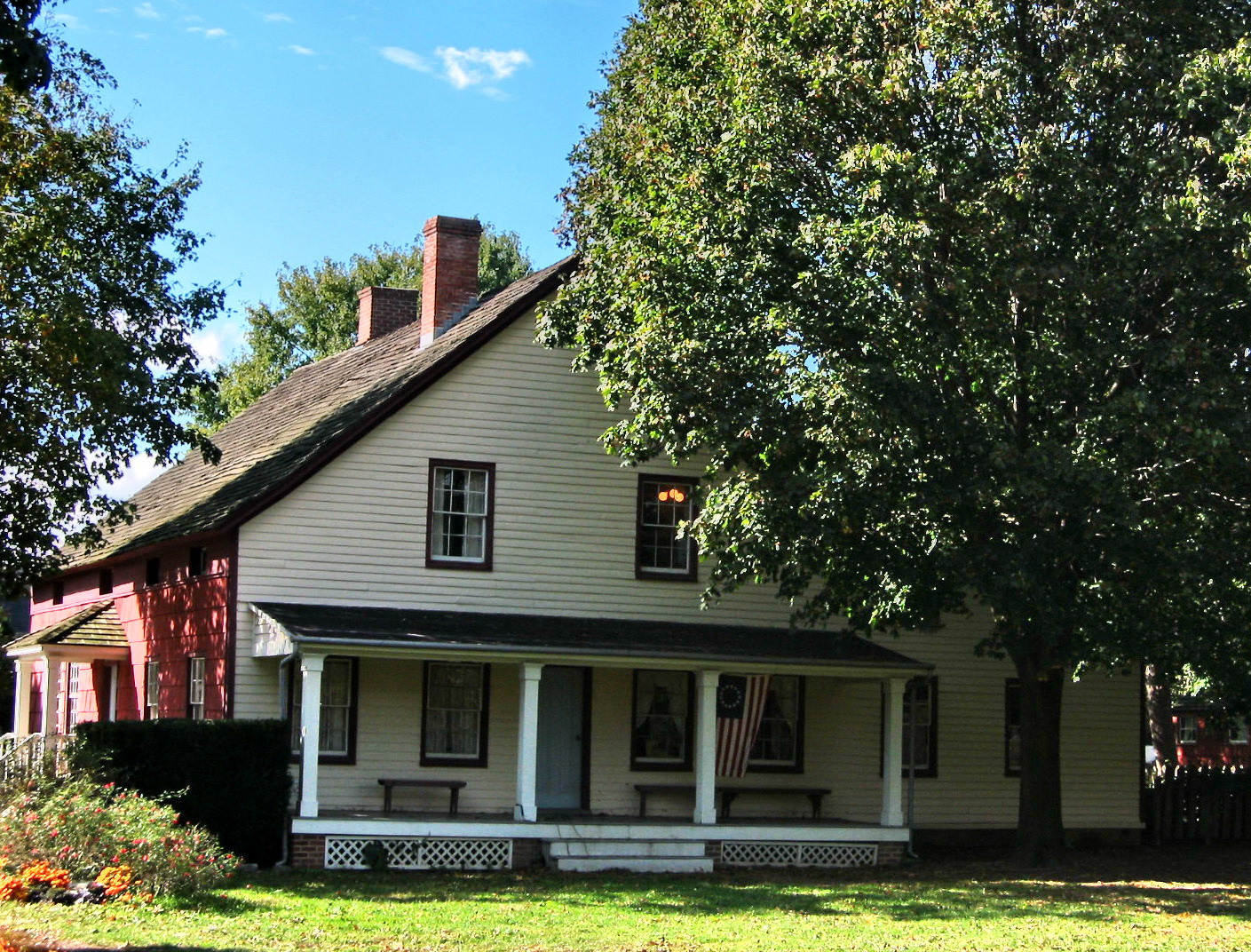
The farmhouse from another angle.

The Cornell Farmhouse was built in 1750 with Dutch and English architectural features. The Farmhouse is also known as the Creedmoor Farmhouse Complex or the Adriance Farmhouse. It is part of the museum and is owned and operated by the New York City Department of Parks and Recreation (NYC Parks).

It was listed as a New York City Landmark in 1976, and on the National Register of Historic Places in 1979.

== History ==
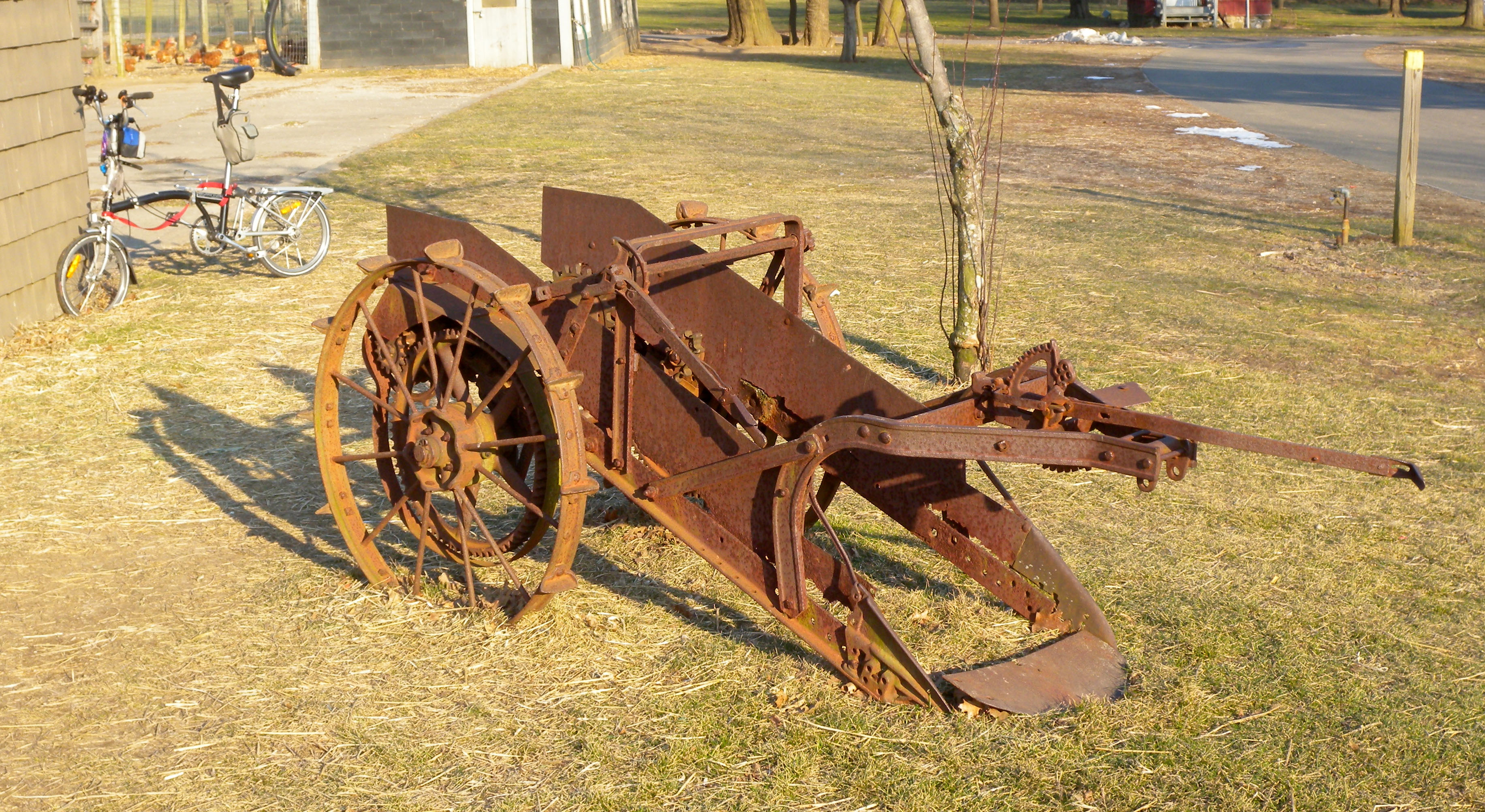
Equipment on display

The farm was privately owned by a Dutch family, the Adriances, from 1697 to 1808. Their three-room farmhouse, built in 1772, has been restored and still stands. After 1808, a series of families owned the farm as it continued to evolve from a colonial homestead to a modern "truck farming" or market gardening business. Under its last private farmer, Daniel Stattel, it became, by 1900, "the second largest [farm] in size in Queens County and the highest in dollar value...assessed at 32,000 dollars." In 1926, the Stattels sold the farm to real estate investor Pauline Reisman, who, in turn, later that year sold it to Creedmoor State Hospital, which used it for occupational therapy, to stock its kitchen, and to grow ornamental plants for the rest of the hospital campus. In 1975, state legislation authored by Frank Padavan transferred ownership of the farm from the hospital to NYC Parks for the purpose of starting a museum.

== See also ==
- List of museums and cultural institutions in New York City
- Open-air museum
- List of New York City Designated Landmarks in Queens
- National Register of Historic Places listings in Queens
