= Mathews Model Flats =

Apartment type in New York City

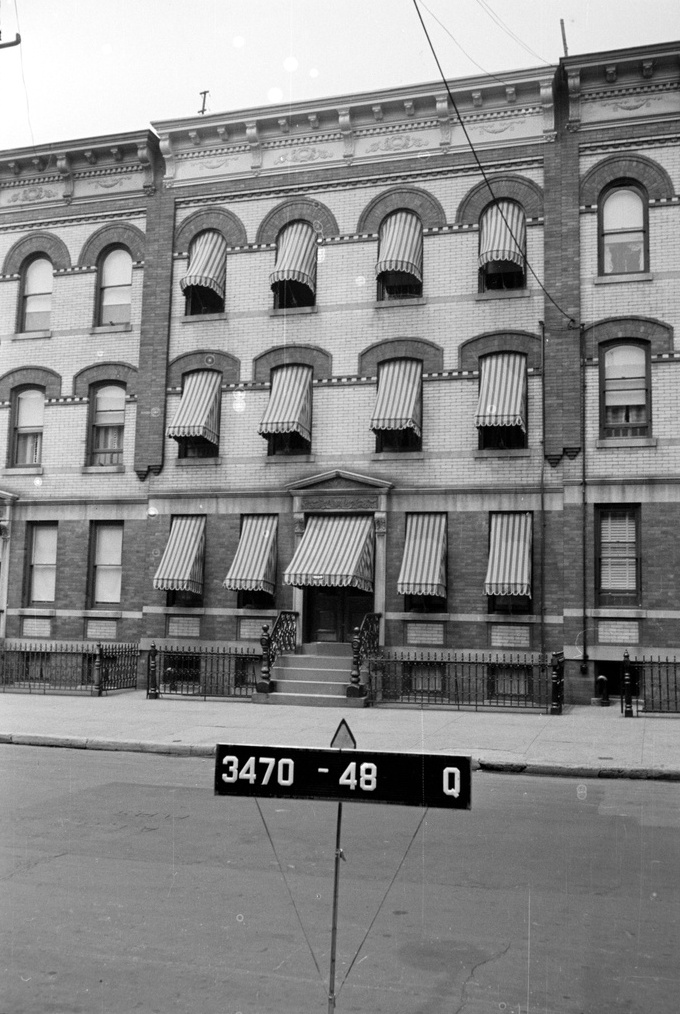
A Mathews Flat at 1859 Madison Street in Ridgewood in 1940

Mathews Model Flats, also called Mathews Flats, are a type of low-rise brick apartment house built in Queens, New York City, United States, mostly between about 1908 and 1930. They were the work of the G. X. Mathews Company, which built more than 3,000 buildings in Queens. The flats became the characteristic residential building of Ridgewood.

The buildings are New Law Tenements, designed to comply with the 1901 New York State Tenement House Act. A typical example is three stories tall above a basement; it contains six apartments, two on each floor, on a lot about 27.5 feet (8.4 m) wide. Each apartment has five rooms and a private bathroom, offering more space, light, and sanitation than the older tenements of Williamsburg and the Lower East Side. The street fronts consist of pale Kreischer brick from Staten Island and are finished with cast-stone trim, a pressed-metal cornice, and iron railings at the stoops and areaways.

In 1915 the New York City Tenement House Department displayed the Mathews Model Flats at the Panama–Pacific International Exposition in San Francisco as an example of affordable working-class housing. Mathews Flats exist as contributing properties within Ridgewood historic districts designated by the New York City Landmarks Preservation Commission and are listed on the National Register of Historic Places.

== History ==
=== Background ===
By the late 19th century, most working-class New Yorkers lived in tenements. Buildings put up under the state's Tenement House Act of 1879 were mostly "dumbbell" tenements, named for the narrow air shafts pinched into their sides, which reformers considered only a slight improvement on earlier housing. The New York State Tenement House Act of 1901, known as the New Law, required better light and fire protection as well as indoor water closets connected to the municipal sewers, one for every two apartments. The law also required a window in every room and larger interior courts for light and air. The Mathews Model Flats were New Law tenements built in response to these rules.

=== Gustave Mathews and the company ===
Gustave Xavier Mathews was born in Rodalben, in the Palatinate of Germany, in 1871. His parents, Xavier and Rosa Matheis, brought their five sons to the United States in 1886, settling in New York and, by 1900, on Myrtle Avenue in Bushwick. Mathews married Clara Kuntz, the daughter of Louis Kuntz, a builder in the Bushwick and Ridgewood area, and learned the building trade from his father-in-law. The family surname was originally Matheis; Mathews legally Americanized it in 1907.

Mathews and two of his brothers, William F. and Ernest, incorporated the Mathews Realty and Construction Company in 1904. The firm's first work used standard 20-foot (6.1 m) lots with a single apartment on each floor. By 1909 Mathews had incorporated the G. X. Mathews Company, of which he was president until his death. He worked almost entirely in Queens, buying large tracts of open land and putting in the streets, sewer lines, and curbing before lining each block with attached houses.

=== Development in Ridgewood ===
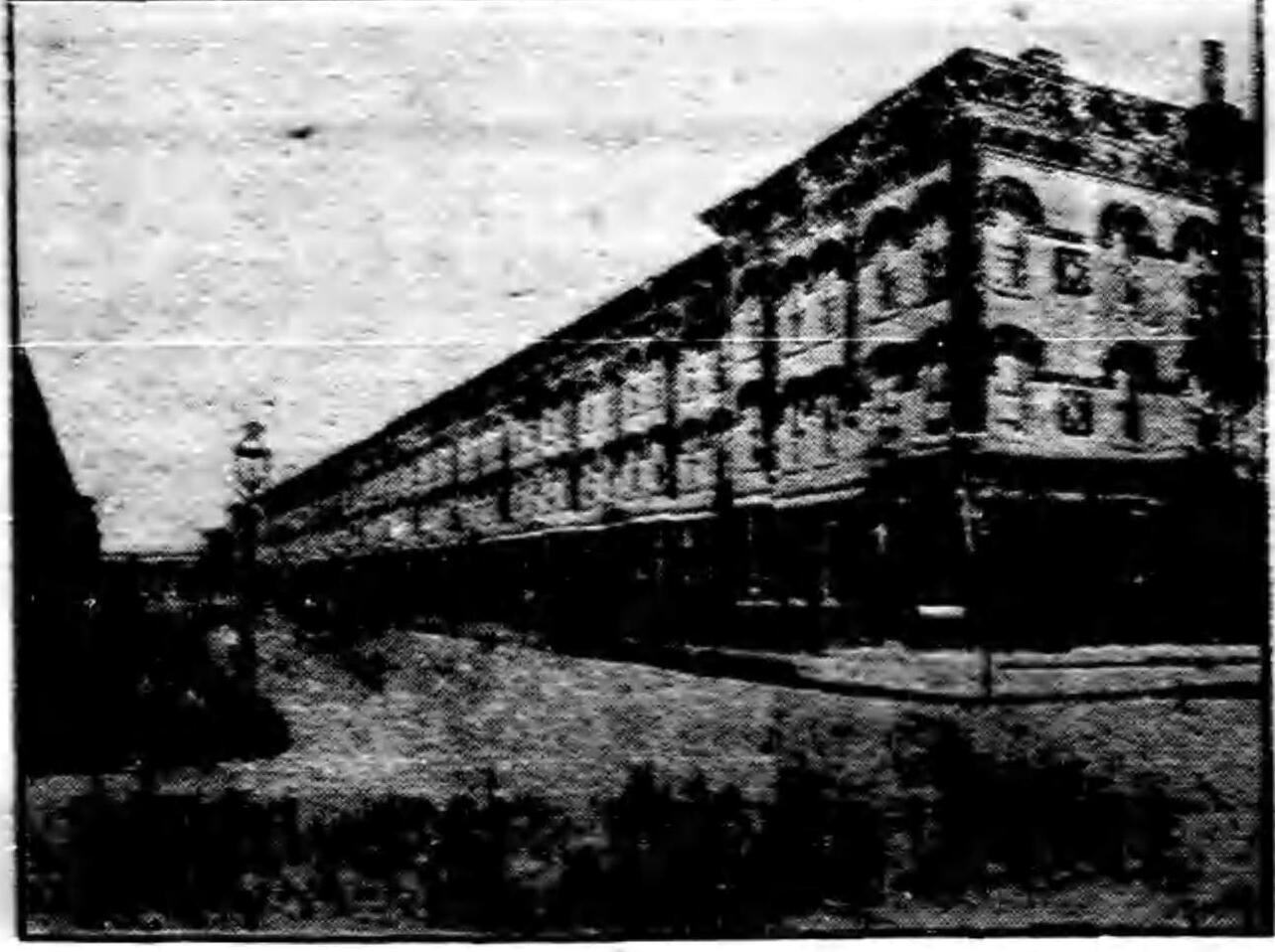
Cornelia Street and Onderdonk Avenue, 1913 (from a Mathews advertisement)

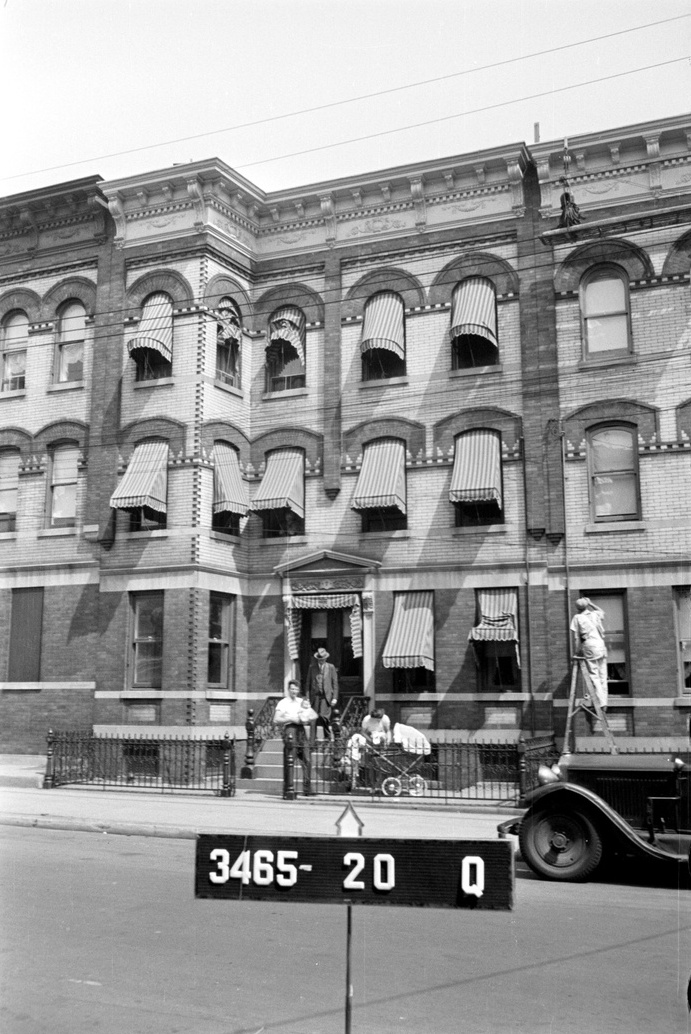
1830 Cornelia Street in a 1940 tax photograph

The company built its earliest model tenements around 1906 and began a full-block development in 1907–1908 on land that later became the Ridgewood North Historic District. After 1905, city building codes barred wood-frame construction in the area and required masonry, and the Mathews rows were built in brick from then on. About 1907 the company settled on its standard design, a six-family, three-story brick house on a lot 27.5 feet (8.4 m) wide and 100 feet (30 m) deep with a rear yard.

The firm acquired a series of former farms in Ridgewood, including the Fleckenstein and Meyerrose farms, and built rows of flats along Madison Street, Putnam Avenue, Cornelia Street, Woodbine Street, Gates Avenue, and Palmetto Street. The company built roughly 650 six-family houses in the neighborhood. The Landmarks Preservation Commission records that Mathews built and sold more than 300 tenements in Ridgewood between 1909 and 1912, and that in 1911 the company received a quarter of all tenement-house permits issued in the borough of Queens. A six-family house sold for about $11,000 on a $2,000 deposit, and rents of $15 to $16 a month for each flat gave the owner enough to cover the mortgage and the building's carrying costs. The company advertised the buildings as "Mathews' Model Flats" and marketed them to investors as having "improvements superior to any others." A May 1912 advertisement said that 700 families were already housed in the flats, with 69 more houses under construction. A 1915 advertisement stated that 800 of its six-family houses had been sold, housing 25,000 people, with 1,000 more planned along Queens Boulevard. The company's dealings were also reported as news in the Brooklyn press. In August 1915 the Brooklyn Daily Times described a $138,000 Queens land transaction involving Ridgewood property improved by the G. X. Mathews Company as one of the most important local real-estate deals of the preceding months.

=== Recognition ===
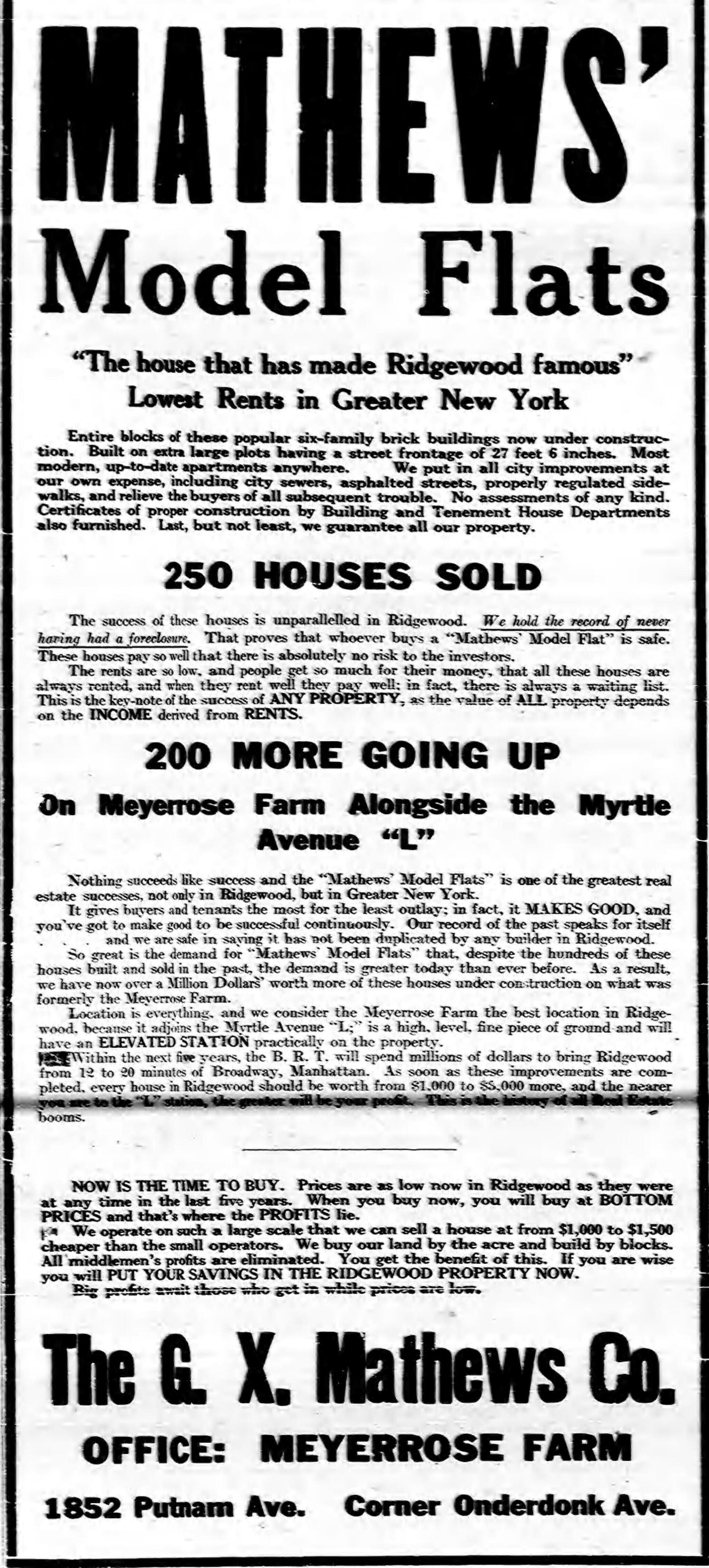
A 1913 advertisement in the Ridgewood Times calling the flats "the house that has made Ridgewood famous".

In 1915 the New York City Tenement House Department described the Mathews Model Flats as the "most up-to-date method of housing for the masses at a minimum of cost," and rival builders imitated the type. The same year, a model of the flats appeared in New York City's exhibit at the Panama–Pacific International Exposition in San Francisco. The exhibit occupied about 15,000 square feet (1,400 m^{2}) and set the buildings alongside miniatures of recent municipal works such as the Williamsburg Bridge and Grand Central Terminal. The historian Mike Wallace writes that the department was "so taken with their model for affordable working-class housing" that it exhibited the flats at the fair.

=== Expansion and later work ===
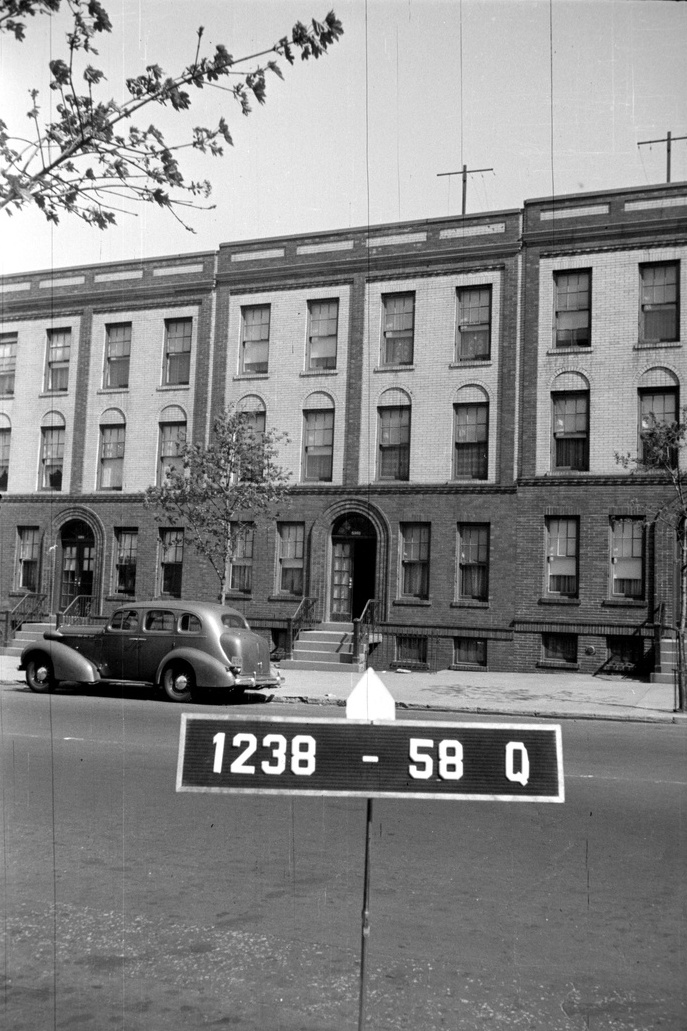
A row of the Mathews Model Flats type on Skillman Avenue in Woodside, 1940 tax photograph; the G. X. Mathews Company built widely in Woodside in the 1920s

Through the World War I years and the 1920s, the company built Mathews Model Flats beyond Ridgewood, in Astoria, Corona, Woodhaven, Long Island City, Sunnyside, and Woodside. In 1917 the New York Times reported that the firm had begun 31 six-family houses in Long Island City, housing for 186 families, amid wartime demand for low-cost apartments that it said had "increased a hundred per cent" since the subway opened. In 1919 the paper described the company's purchase of the Sussdorf estate on the north side of Queens Boulevard, by the Lincoln Avenue station of the Corona line, where it planned to build 50 buildings once a sewer extension opened the land to development. By the time the City Housing Corporation began building Sunnyside Gardens in the mid-1920s, Mathews had already built more than 300 buildings just east of the site in Woodside. The firm moved its office from Ridgewood to Long Island City in 1919 and to Woodside in 1924, where it advertised that it had sold more than 950 houses without a single foreclosure. The same year, the New York Times reported that the company had sold 53 six-family houses in the previous month, each priced at $25,500 with a cash payment of $6,000, before the buildings were finished. Of some 950 Mathews Model Flats sold in Queens and Brooklyn, more than three-quarters went to first-time property buyers, most paying with savings-bank passbooks. By this period the business operated as the G. X. Mathews Company (along with the Mathews Bond and Guaranty Company and the Mathews Mortgage Corporation) and operated from a storefront in one of its own buildings on Roosevelt Avenue. In 1927 the Daily News reported that the company was doubling its output for the year and rushing another million-dollar development at Sunnyside to completion.

In the 1930s the company turned mainly to one- and two-family houses, including about 250 one-family brick houses with garages in Elmhurst and about 150 two-family houses in Maspeth, designed in a streamlined style. Its final model flats were built around 1930 in eastern Maspeth and Elmhurst. Working with the architect Louis Allmendinger, Mathews adapted the standard plan to local height limits by placing an apartment in a raised basement, and set the rows along the area's curving streets. The Elmhurst project was not completed until the summer of 1942. Mathews died in 1958 at the age of 88, after more than fifty years as a builder in Queens.

== Architecture and design ==
=== Form and plan ===
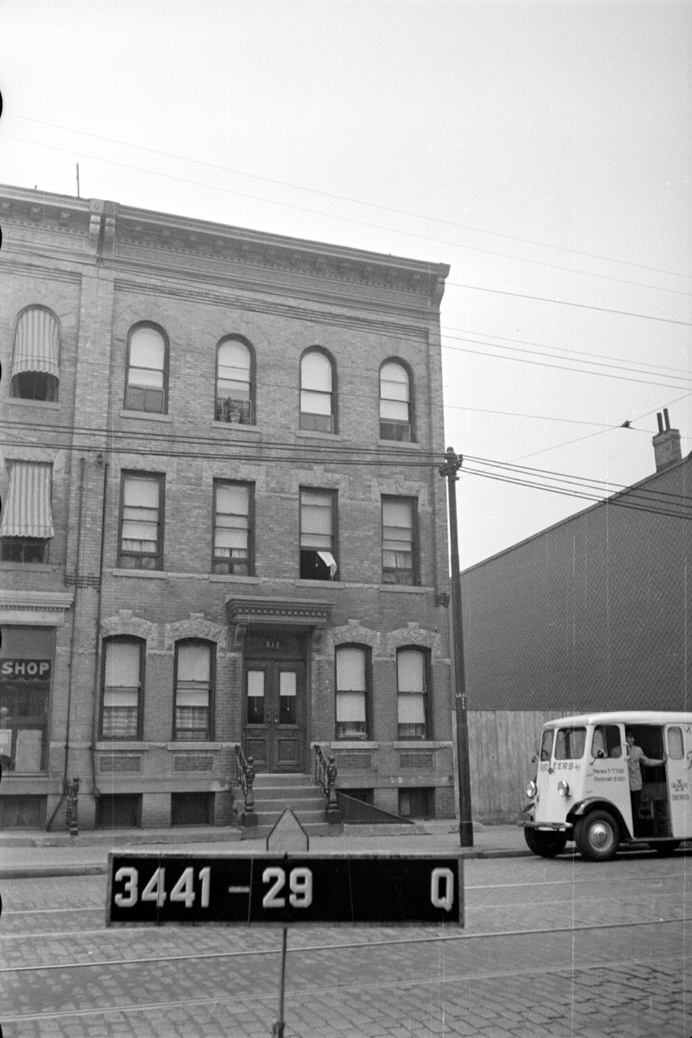
612 Seneca Avenue, Ridgewood, among the earliest Mathews flats (built 1906), in a 1940 tax photograph

A standard Mathews Model Flats building is three stories tall above a basement and holds six apartments, one on each side of a central entrance on each of the three floors. Each unit is a railroad flat running the full depth of the building. Windows at the front and rear, with shafts cut along the side walls, bring daylight to every room. The Queens writer Mitch Waxman has called the buildings "barbell tenements," each holding six railroad units around a central air shaft. The plots were about 27.5 feet (8.4 m) in width, more generous than those common to earlier flats buildings, and each had an open rear yard.

The type had several variants. Corner buildings often carried a store in the ground floor and contained four apartments above. The company's earliest buildings, on narrower lots, held a single apartment per floor. The final flats of about 1930 were built lower, with a full apartment in a raised basement, to meet height restrictions in Elmhurst and Maspeth.

=== Materials and style ===
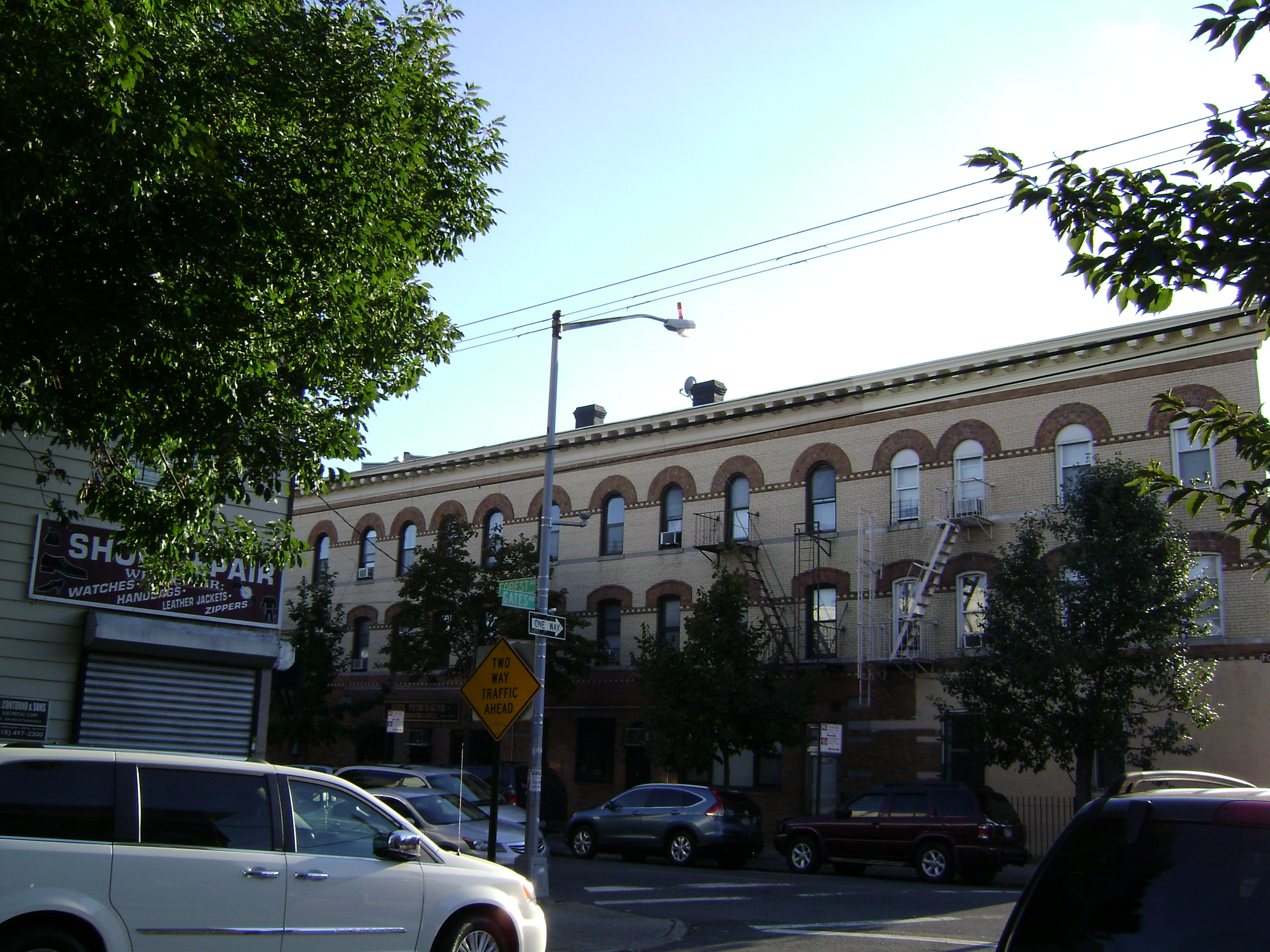
A Mathews flats row with a ground-floor corner store, showing the arched window heads and bracketed cornice

The walls are of load-bearing masonry, their fronts faced in pale Kreischer brick that is mostly buff and amber iron-spot, set off with red and brown. The brick came from the Kreischer Brick Manufacturing Company of Kreischerville, on Staten Island. That firm grew from a brickworks founded in the 1850s by Balthazar Kreischer, a Bavarian immigrant, and was reincorporated under the Kreischer name in 1902 before closing in 1927. The Ridgewood Iron Works furnished the stoop railings, fences, and gates, and Charles Rothbach Inc. supplied the millwork.

The company built to a small number of standard elevations, so the flats form continuous rows of nearly identical fronts. Contrasting brick colors, trim of cast stone, and a bracketed metal cornice recur throughout. Their round-arched window heads and other details draw on the Renaissance Revival style, with some Romanesque Revival elements. Several architects worked for Mathews. The firm of Louis Berger & Co. designed rows for many Ridgewood builders, while Louis Allmendinger (1878–1937) is credited with the design of the Mathews Model Flats themselves.

=== Interiors and systems ===
Each apartment contained five rooms, a living room, dining room, sitting room, bedroom, and kitchen, together with a private bathroom holding a toilet, sink, and tub. The units were "cold-water flats," with running water and a full bath but, as first built, no hot water and no central heating. For warmth each flat relied on the kitchen's coal range and a kerosene burner in the parlor. Central heat was added to many of the buildings only during the 1930s. Even so, a flat gave a working-class family more space, light, and plumbing than an older tenement, and owning a six-family house meant both a home and a source of rental income.

== Legacy ==
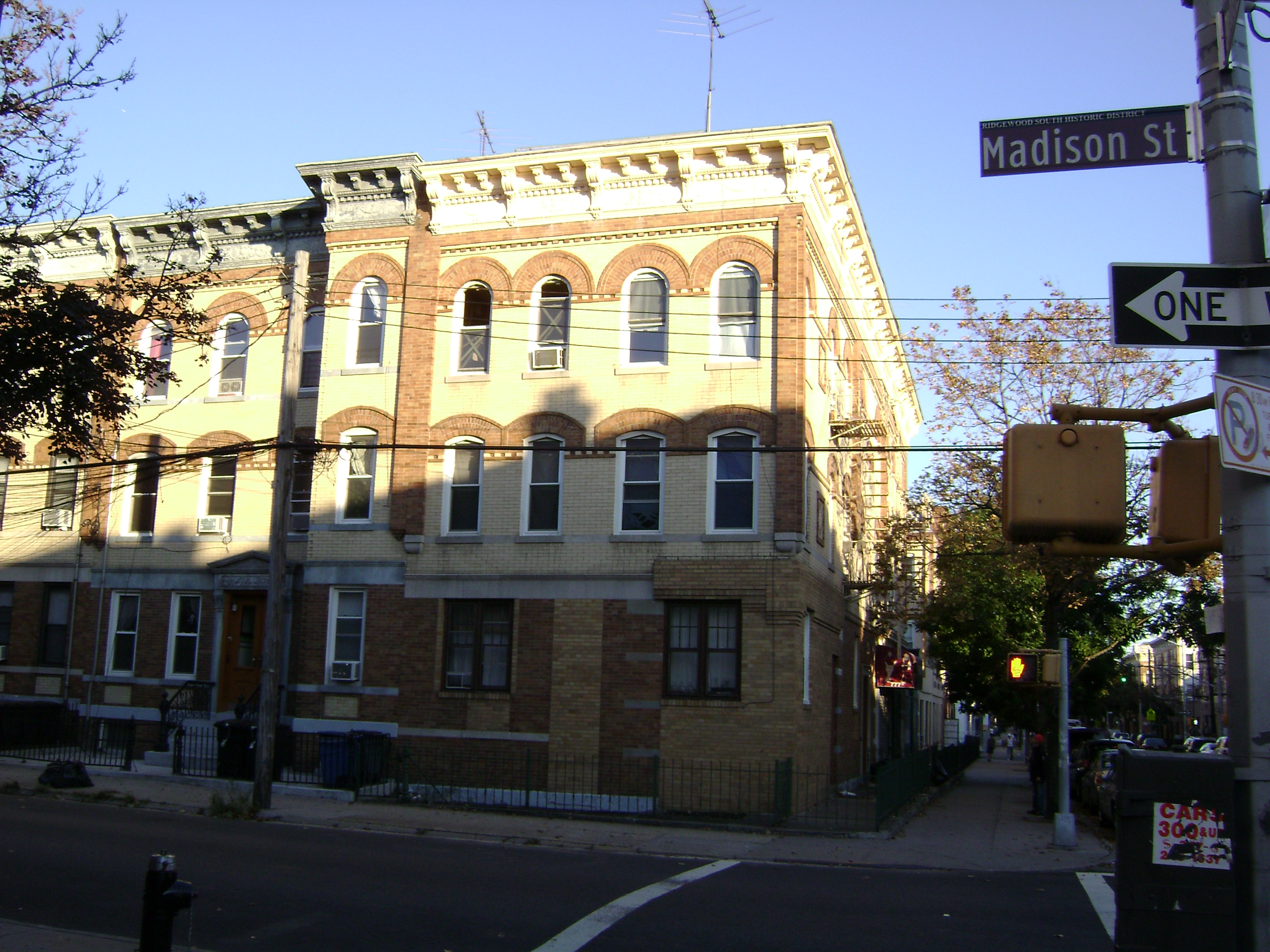
A Mathews Model Flats building on Madison Street in Ridgewood

Mathews Model Flats shaped the built environment of Ridgewood and several other Queens neighborhoods, where rows of them line entire blocks. Over his career Mathews is estimated to have built more than 3,000 buildings in Queens. In 1925, its houses, set side by side, would form a line more than three and a half miles long. By 1926, the company was reported to have built more than 1,200 flats, housing over 30,000 people, that would stretch more than four miles. Later accounts repeat this comparison ranging from four to four and a half miles.

The historian Jeffrey A. Kroessler has written that, although the flats were attractive and solidly built, they differed little in design from other urban tenements and, as railroad flats, offered no connection to open space or greenery. Kroessler places them among the model-housing efforts of early-20th-century western Queens but differentated as the work of a private builder seeking a profit, with other examples including the limited-dividend City Housing Corporation and the philanthropic Phipps Houses.

Many of the flats are now protected as historic landmarks. The New York City Landmarks Preservation Commission designated the Ridgewood North Historic District, of 96 buildings, on September 15, 2009; the Ridgewood South Historic District on October 26, 2010; and the Central Ridgewood Historic District on December 9, 2014. Many Ridgewood blocks built with Mathews flats had earlier been listed on the National Register of Historic Places in 1983, when roughly 3,000 buildings in the neighborhood were entered on the state and national registers as part of the Ridgewood Multiple Resource Area. Under the city designations, changes to the exteriors of the buildings require the commission's approval.

== See also ==
- Old Law Tenement
- Three-decker (house)
