= Long Island City Courthouse =

Building in Queens, New York

- Long Island City Courthouse Complex
- U.S. National Register of Historic Places
- New York State Register of Historic Places
- New York City Landmark
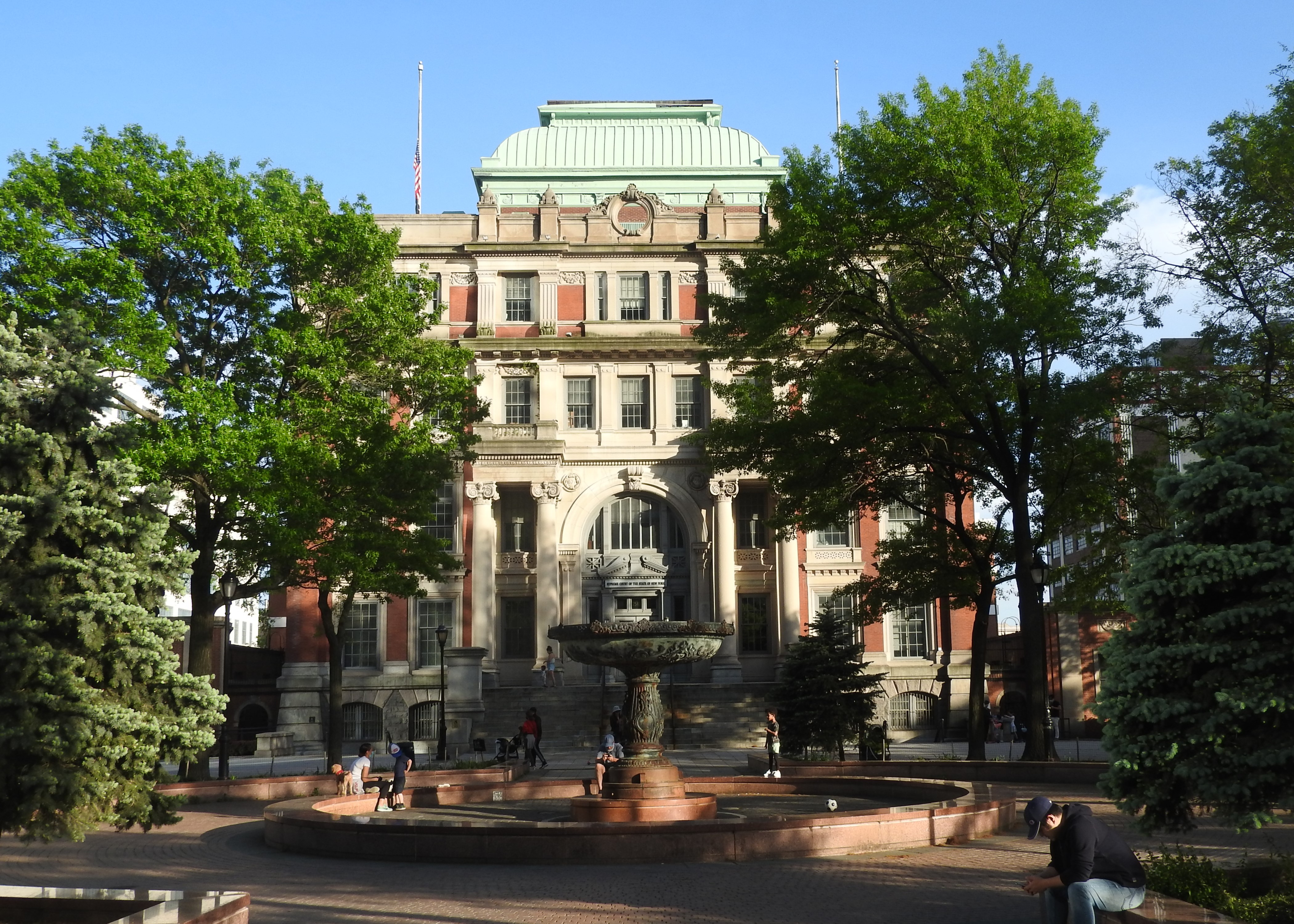
- Long Island City Courthouse
- Location: 25-10 Court Sq., Long Island City, New York
- Coordinates: 40°44′45″N 73°56′35″W
- Area: 2 acres (0.81 ha)
- Built: 1876
- Architects: Hathorne, George; Coco, Peter M.
- Architectural style: Late 19th and 20th Century Revivals, Neo-English Renaissance
- NRHP reference No.: 83001776
- NYSRHP No.: 08101.000007
- NYCL No.: 0925

Significant dates
- Added to NRHP: September 26, 1983
- Designated NYSRHP: August 8, 1983
- Designated NYCL: May 11, 1976

The Long Island City Courthouse is located at 25-10 Court Square in Long Island City, Queens, New York City. It formerly housed Criminal Court, County Court, the District Attorney staff, and the county sheriff's office. Today the Courthouse is another home to the Civil Term of Supreme Court, Queens County, which also sits in Jamaica. The courthouse was originally built in 1874 to a design by architect George Hathorne, and was remodeled and enlarged by Peter M. Coco in 1904. It was considered to be one of the most important buildings in Queens County.

The Long Island City Courthouse complex was designated a New York City landmark in 1976, and has been listed on the National Register of Historic Places since 1983.

== History ==
The building was erected in 1874 to a design by George Hathorne. The location was decided on as the Queens County Seat moved from Jamaica to Long Island City, due to access to nearby transportation. In a 2007 article in Newsday, staff writer Geoffrey Mohan writes of the relocation of the Queens County Courthouse from Garden City Park, Nassau County, to Long Island City. Mohan refers to this relocation as one of decades of controversy, and possible reasons contributing to Nassau County's secession from Queens.

The courthouse was remodeled and enlarged by Peter M. Coco in 1904 after a fire destroyed a portion of it. In its remodeling the building was raised from two stories to four stories in order to accommodate the needs of the court. The courthouse is designed in what has been variously described as a Neo-English Renaissance, neoclassical, or Beaux Arts architectural style and is made of stone, ceramic tile, limestone, and metal.

Two jails were formerly part of the complex, but were replaced by a parking garage in 1988. The parking structure was designed by Chicago-based architectural firm Skidmore, Owings and Merrill.

The courthouse and its surrounding complex has undergone rejuvenation and renovations in the mid-2000s. Liz Skalka, a Chronicle correspondent, reported on August 24, 2006 that: "The ornate courthouse began undergoing repairs in May that included renovations on its brick exterior and new roofing on the main building and its wings. Both are to protect against water damage. A prominent third floor courtroom, noted for its two-story stained glass ceiling, is also being restored, and will receive new wooden flooring similar to its original." The fountain outside the courthouse was removed in 2025, despite local residents' requests that it be saved.

== See also ==
- National Register of Historic Places listings in Queens County, New York
- List of New York City Designated Landmarks in Queens
