= La Casina =

Historic commercial building in Queens, New York

- U.S. National Register of Historic Places
- New York City Landmark
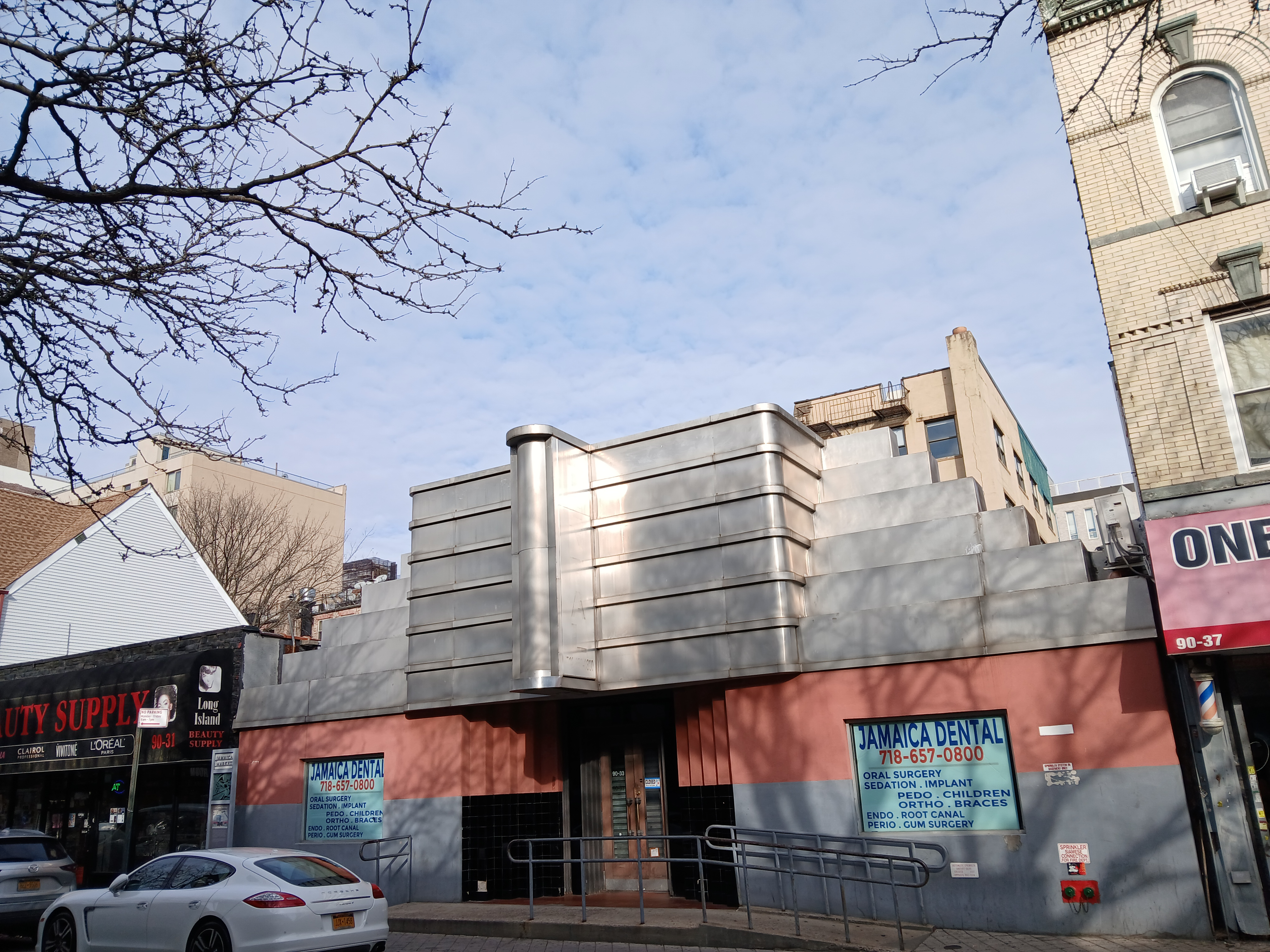
- La Casina, November 2025

- Location within New York City Location within New York Location within the United States
- Location: 90-33 160th St., Jamaica, New York
- Coordinates: 40°42′16″N 73°48′0″W
- Area: less than one acre
- Built: 1934
- Architectural style: Moderne
- NRHP reference No.: 89002259
- NYCL No.: 1940

Significant dates
- Added to NRHP: March 1, 1990
- Designated NYCL: January 30, 1996

La Casina is a historic commercial building located in Jamaica, Queens. New York City. It was originally built about 1907 and completely redesigned about 1936 in the Streamline Moderne style. It is a one-story building designed for use as a nightclub. It has a streamlined facade in the form of a stepped pyramid or ziggurat. The building retains its original vertical neon sign. From the 1940s through 1987, the building housed a clothing factory.

It was listed on the National Register of Historic Places in 1990, and a New York City Landmark in 1996.

== See also ==
- List of New York City Designated Landmarks in Queens
- National Register of Historic Places listings in Queens County, New York
