= Seneca–Onderdonk–Woodward Historic District =

Historic district in Queens, New York

- U.S. National Register of Historic Places
- U.S. Historic district
- New York State Register of Historic Places
- New York City Landmark
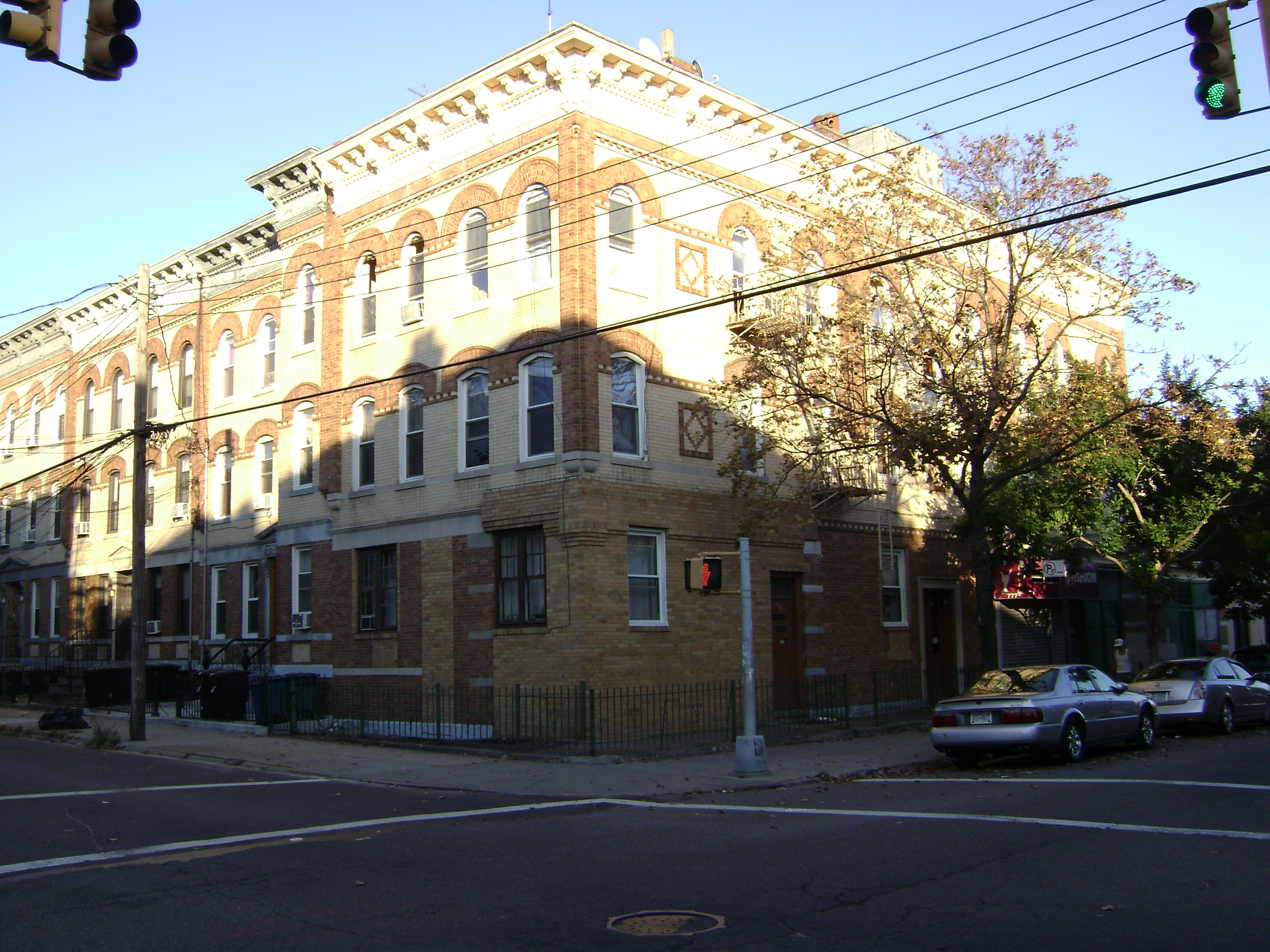

- Location within New York City Location within New York Location within the United States
- Location: Roughly bounded by Woodward, Seneca, Catalpa Avenues, and Woodbine Street, Queens, New York
- Coordinates: 40°42′9″N 73°54′17″W
- Area: 21 acres (8.5 ha)
- Built: 1911
- Architect: Mathews, G.X.; Allmendinger, Louis
- Architectural style: Mathews Flats
- MPS: Ridgewood MRA
- NRHP reference No.: 83001779
- NYCL No.: 2348

Significant dates
- Added to NRHP: September 30, 1983
- Designated NYSRHP: August 17, 1983
- Designated NYCL: October 26, 2010

Seneca–Onderdonk–Woodward Historic District is a national historic district in Ridgewood, Queens, New York. It includes 211 contributing buildings built in 1911–1912. They consist mainly of three story brick tenements with two apartments per floor. The buildings feature amber brick facades with burnt orange brick bases and trim.

It was listed on the National Register of Historic Places in 1983. The NRHP district overlaps with the New York City Landmarks Preservation Commission's Ridgewood South Historic District.
