= Louis Allmendinger =

American architect (1878–1937)

- Born: September 15, 1878; Brooklyn, New York
- Died: October 7, 1937 (aged 59); Amityville, New York
- Known for: Architect

Louis Allmendinger, AIA (September 15, 1878 – October 7, 1937) was an American architect practicing in New York City in the early twentieth century.

Two of his designs are listed on the National Register of Historic Places: the Russian Orthodox Cathedral of the Transfiguration of Our Lord (1916–1921) in Brooklyn, New York, and the art deco J. Kurtz and Sons Store Building (1931) in Queens.

Allmendinger was born in Brooklyn to German emigrant parents, Adam, a beer brewer from Baden-Württemberg, and Dorothea Scharf, from Bavaria. He studied architecture at Cooper Union College.

He died of a cerebral embolism in 1937 at Brunswick Hospital on Long Island. He was survived by his wife, Marie Heins, and son, Louis William Allmendinger.
