= Murray Hill station (LIRR) =

Long Island Rail Road station in Queens, New York

Murray Hill
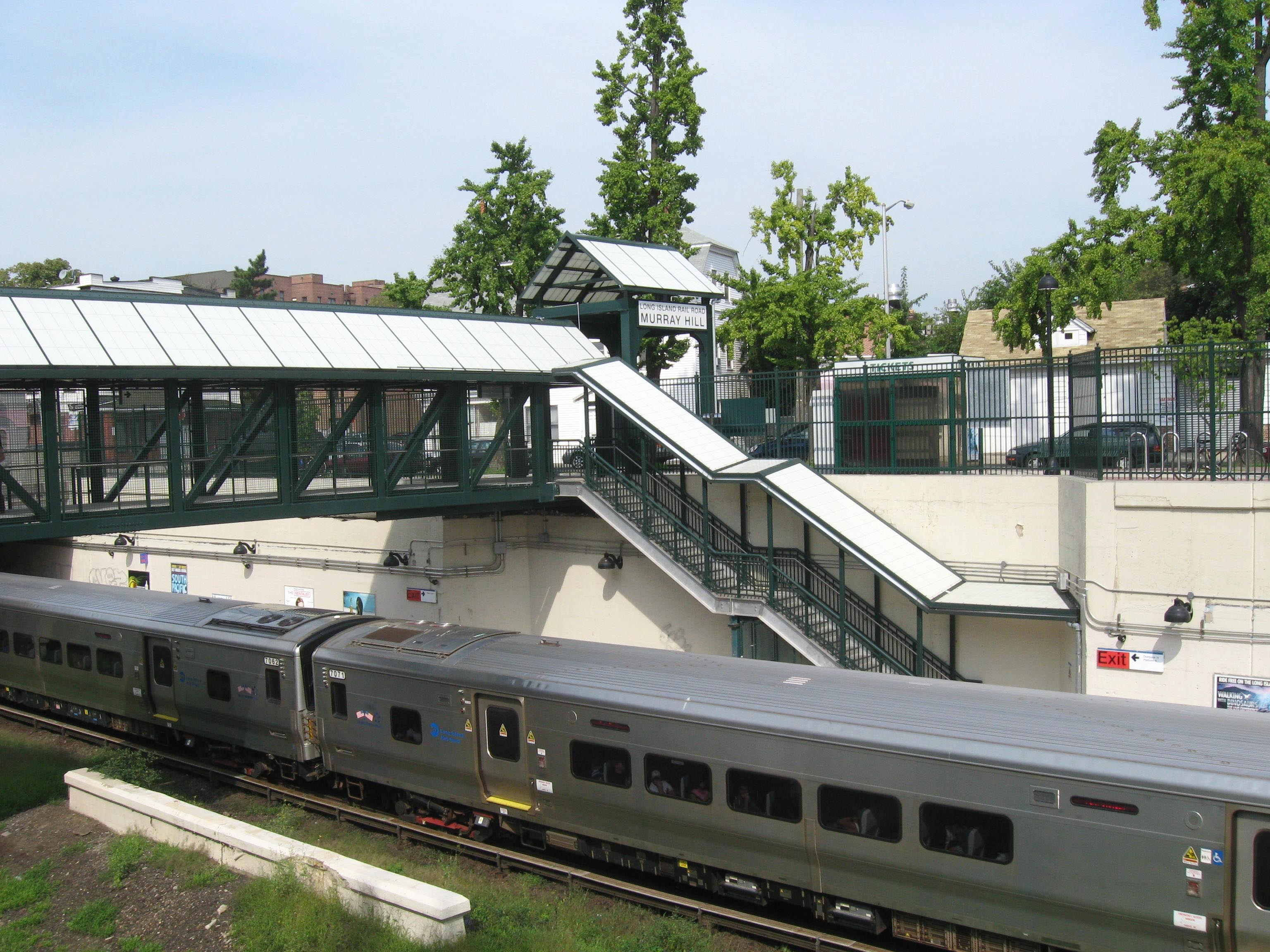
- A westbound train at the station in 2008

General information
- Location: 150th Street and 41st Avenue; Murray Hill, Queens, New York
- Coordinates: 40.762703°N 73.814446°W
- Owner: Long Island Rail Road
- Line: Port Washington Branch
- Distance: 8.4 mi (13.5 km) from Long Island City
- Platforms: 2 side platforms
- Tracks: 2
- Connections: NYCT Bus: Q12, Q13, Q15; MTA Bus: Q28, Q65; Nassau Inter-County Express: n20G, n20X

Construction
- Parking: No
- Cycle facilities: Yes
- Accessible: Yes

Other information
- Station code: MHL
- Fare zone: 3

History
- Opened: 1889
- Closed: 1912
- Rebuilt: 1914, 1991–1993, 2005, 2019–2020
- Electrified: October 21, 1913; 750 V (DC) third rail

Passengers
- 2012—2014: 1,203
- Rank: 70 of 125

Services
Preceding station	Long Island Rail Road	Following station
Flushing–Main Street toward Penn Station or Grand Central	Port Washington Branch	Broadway toward Port Washington
Location

Murray Hill is a station on the Long Island Rail Road's Port Washington Branch in the Murray Hill section of Flushing, in Queens, New York City. It is located beneath 150th Street and 41st Avenue, just south of Roosevelt Avenue. The station is part of CityTicket.

== History ==
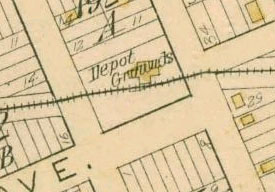
1891 map of Murray Hill station

The Murray Hill station was originally built by the Flushing and North Side Railroad April 1889 as a grade level station. The station's opening helped spur new, rapid growth within the community.

=== 20th century ===
The original station was razed in 1912, when the Port Washington Branch was depressed below grade in this area during a grade crossing elimination project throughout the Broadway & Murray Hill sections of Flushing, which took place between 1912 and 1914, as the area was experiencing rapid growth. As part of this project, which was executed by the New York Public Service Commission and saw initial controversy after locals expressed concerns over damages to properties, new high-level platforms were constructed in the open cut, the grade crossings were replaced by overpasses to carry the roads over the depressed tracks, and the original station house was demolished and was replaced in July 1914 with one built on a bridge built over the tracks.

In 1964, the 1914-built station house was torn down and was not replaced, thus making Murray Hill an unstaffed station; Murray Hill continues to operate as an unstaffed station, without a station house.

During the latter half of the 1970s, the station and its immediate vicinity were suffering from some decline, with several businesses closing and the station being subjected to an endemic of vandalism and dumping – a trend seen at the time throughout much of New York City. In 1978, the Flushing Savings Bank, which was headquartered nearby on Northern Boulevard, proposed capping the station and tracks with a public plaza between Barton Avenue and 149th street, in an attempt to revitalize the area and reverse the decline; the surrounding storefronts would also be redesigned in the continental architectural style. Although the plaza was never constructed and the tracks were never capped, the decline eventually reversed, and the station was cleaned & repaired.

Minor renovations to the station took place between 1991 and 1993.

=== 21st century ===
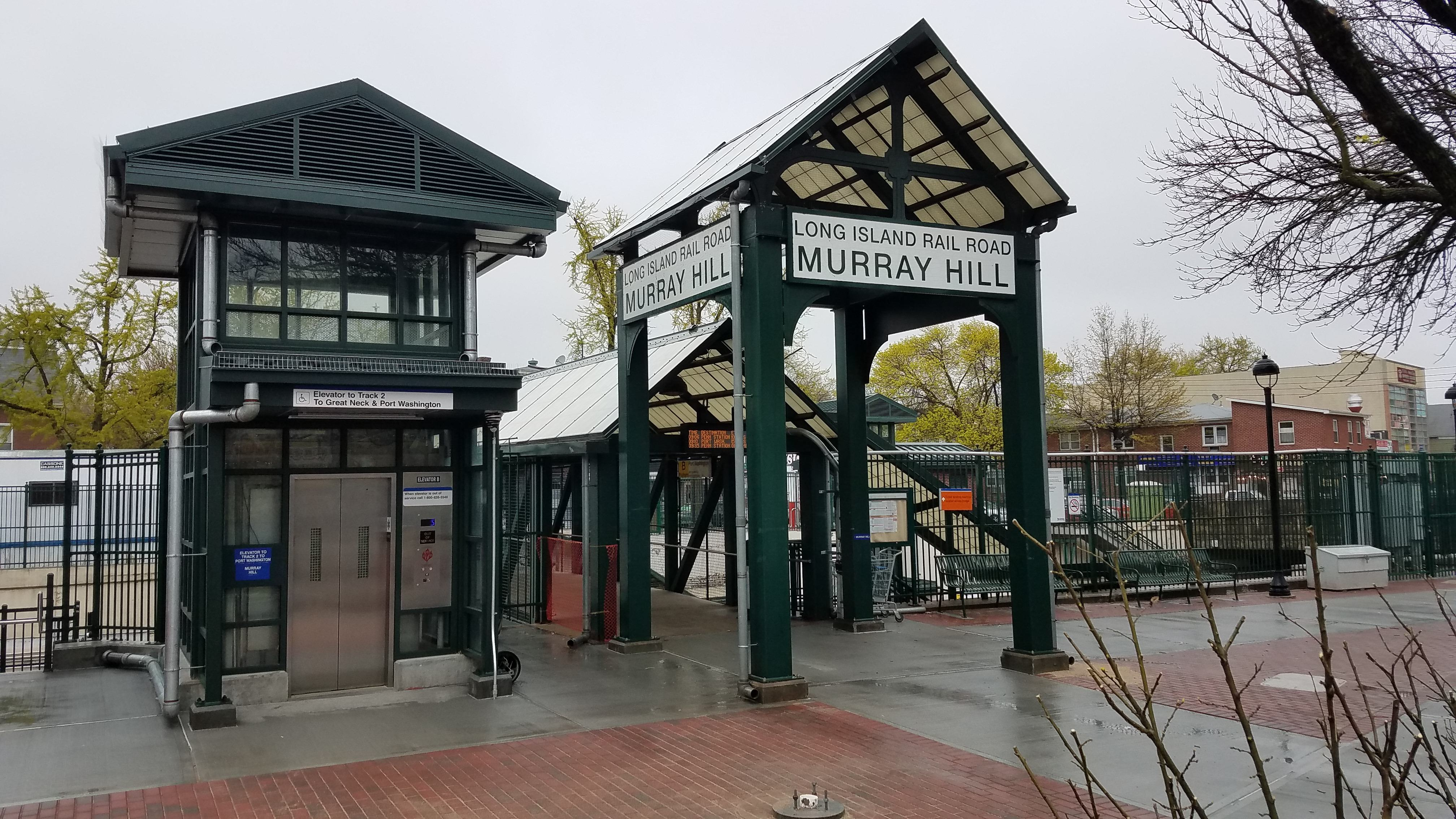
The entrance to the station in 2020

In 2005, the Murray Hill station underwent further renovations, with a new pedestrian bridge being erected and other station amenities being added.

Between 2019 and 2020, the underwent a major station modernization project, through which it was made wheelchair accessible and compliant with the Americans with Disabilities Act of 1990, with the installation of two elevators. The elevators were originally slated for completion in 2019, but were delayed to mid-2020 due to delays in the delivery of the elevator cabs. The station's elevators ultimately opened by May 4, 2020. The project, which was supported by Congresswoman Grace Meng and New York City Comptroller Scott Stringer, also included the installation of LED lighting, CCTV cameras, and new signage, among various other improvements.

== Station layout ==
The station has two high-level side platforms, each four cars long. The first four cars toward Manhattan and the last four cars toward Great Neck & Port Washington will platform at the station.

G	Ground level	Exit/entrance, crossover, buses
P Platform level	Platform A, side platform
P Platform level	Track 1	← Port Washington Branch toward Penn Station or Grand Central Madison (Flushing–Main Street)
P Platform level	Track 2	Port Washington Branch toward Great Neck or Port Washington (Broadway) →
P Platform level	Platform B, side platform

== See also ==
- List of Long Island Rail Road stations
- History of the Long Island Rail Road
