= Walter Bowne =

American politician

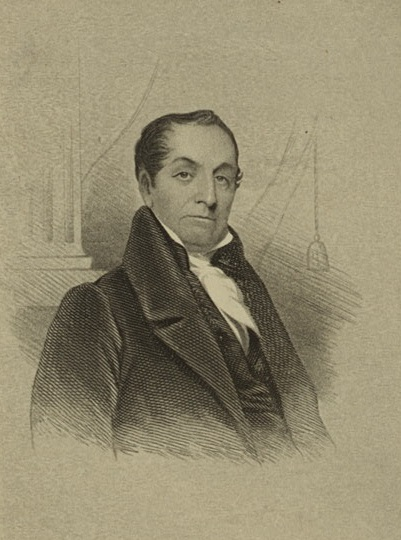

60th Mayor of New York City
- In office 1829–1833
- Preceded by: William Paulding Jr.
- Succeeded by: Gideon Lee

Personal details
- Born: 26 September 1770 Flushing, Province of New York, British America
- Died: 31 August 1846 (aged 75) Queens County, New York, U.S.
- Party: Democratic
- Spouse: Eliza Southgate Bowne

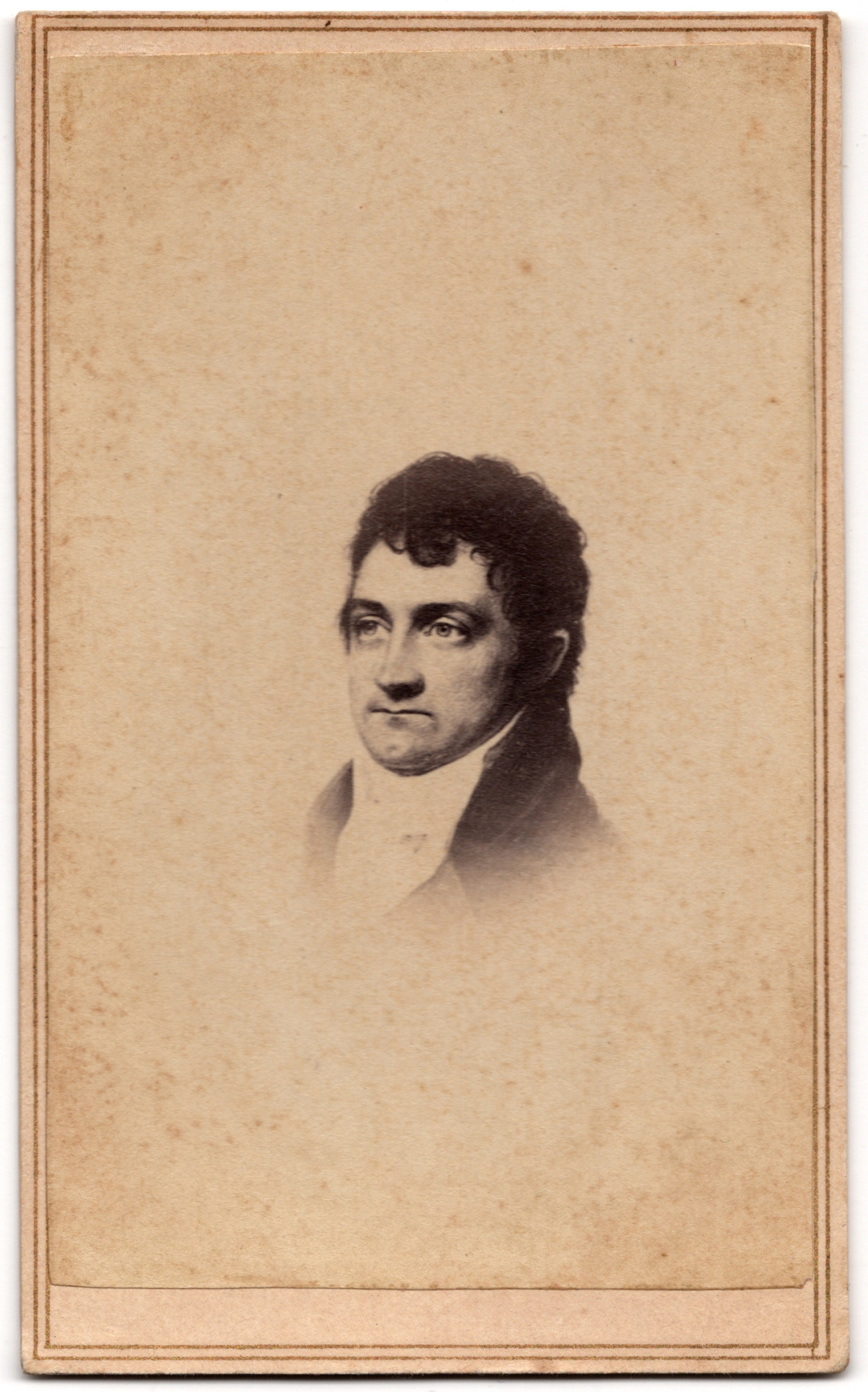
Walter Bowne

Walter Bowne (26 September 1770 – 31 August 1846) was the 60th Mayor of New York City from 1829 to 1833.

== Family ==
Walter Bowne was born in Flushing, Long Island, New York, the son of James Bowne and his wife Caroline Rodman. He was a descendant of John Bowne who, with other fellow Quakers was part of the Flushing Remonstrance, one of the earliest establishments of the freedom of religion in North America, and one of the predecessor documents on which the First Amendment to the United States Constitution was based.

== Political career ==
He was a New York State senator from the Southern District from 1816 to 1822, and from the 1st District 1823 to 1824.

He was a member of the Council of Appointment at Albany from 1817 to 1820.

He was Mayor of New York City from 1829 to 1833. Faced with reports of cholera in neighboring towns in 1832, he implemented a strict quarantine policy, regulating travel to and from New York City, and restricting ships to a distance of 300 yd (270 m) from port, and carriages from within 1.5 mi (2.4 km) of the city. His attempt to prevent an epidemic failed - because it was based on the mistaken but then-accepted notion that transmission of cholera was through personal contact rather than through contaminated water and food, The actual means of transmission was not discovered until 1883.

== Banker ==
Bowne was also the first President of 7th Ward Bank of New York City.

== Marriage and children ==
He married Eliza Southgate in 1803. They had two children, Walter Bowne, Jr., and Mary King Bowne, who married John Watson Lawrence.

== Legacy ==
Bowne Park (bounded by 29th and 32nd Avenue and 155th and 159th Streets in Flushing, Queens) is named for Walter Bowne. It is the site where his summer residence stood until a fire destroyed it in March 1925.
