= John Bowne =

17th-century Quaker activist

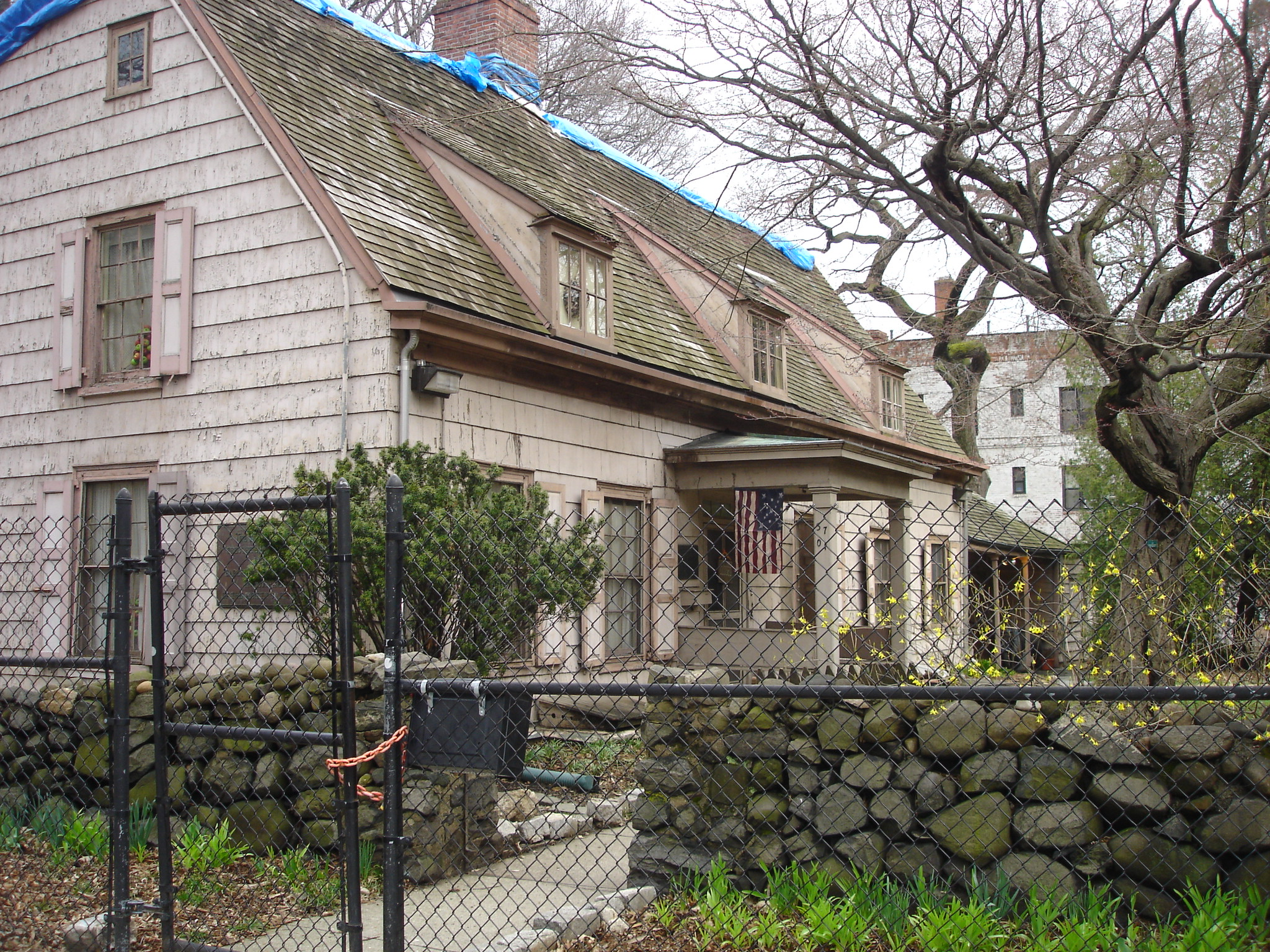
Bowne House in Flushing, Queens, New York

John Bowne (1627–1695), the progenitor of the Bowne family in America, was a Quaker and an English settler residing in the Dutch colony of New Netherland. He is historically significant for his struggle for religious liberty.

== Background ==
Born in Matlock, Derbyshire, on 9 March 1627, Bowne emigrated with his father and sister to Boston, Massachusetts, in 1648. Bowne became a merchant and married well, his first wife Hannah Feake (ca.1637–1678), whom he married in 1656, being a great-niece of Governor John Winthrop of Massachusetts. Bowne and his bride became adherents of the new doctrine of Quakerism, which was then being actively repressed in most of the English colonies of New England. Accordingly, by 1661, they had relocated to Flushing, Long Island, where a small group of English-speaking Quakers were attempting to practice their faith in defiance of the Dutch governor of New Netherland, Peter Stuyvesant.

== Fight for religious freedom ==
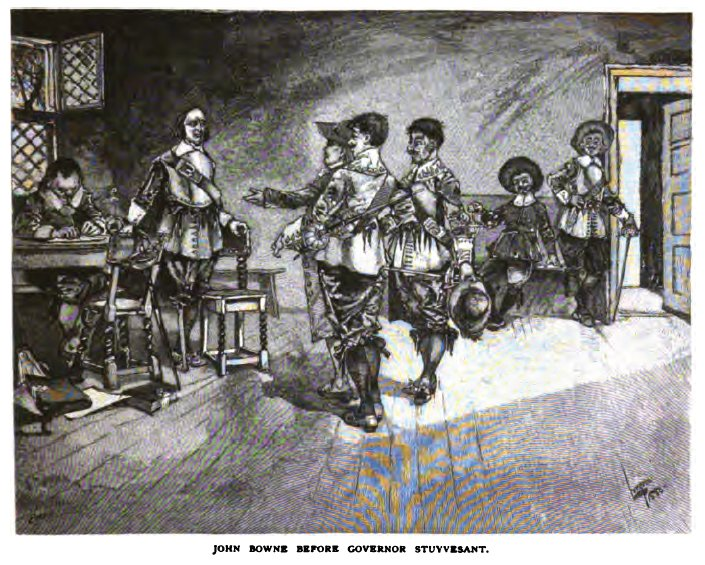
1881 illustration from Scribner's Magazine periodical

In 1662, Bowne was arrested by the New Amsterdam sheriff, Resolved Waldron, under orders of Governor Stuyvesant, for allowing a Quaker meeting in his house. Refusing to pay the assessed fine, or to depart from the province, he was sent to Holland for trial before the Dutch West India Company. There, he successfully exonerated himself by appealing to the guarantees of religious liberty contained in the Flushing patent of 1645 granted by Governor William Kieft; see Flushing Remonstrance. Winning the respect of his judges by his uncompromising stance, he was released, and returned triumphantly home in 1664, Governor Stuyvesant being ordered to extend tolerance to all religious sects.

Although New Netherland was soon to become the English colony of New York, the ideal of religious freedom for which John Bowne had stood up was upheld by the province's new rulers, serving as an example for the other English colonies in North America, and ultimately to the framers of the American Constitution as well.

A 1672 letter from Bowne and other Quakers to the Governor of New York explaining their conscientious refusal to contribute funds for the repair of the fort of New York is one of the earliest examples of American Quaker war tax resistance.

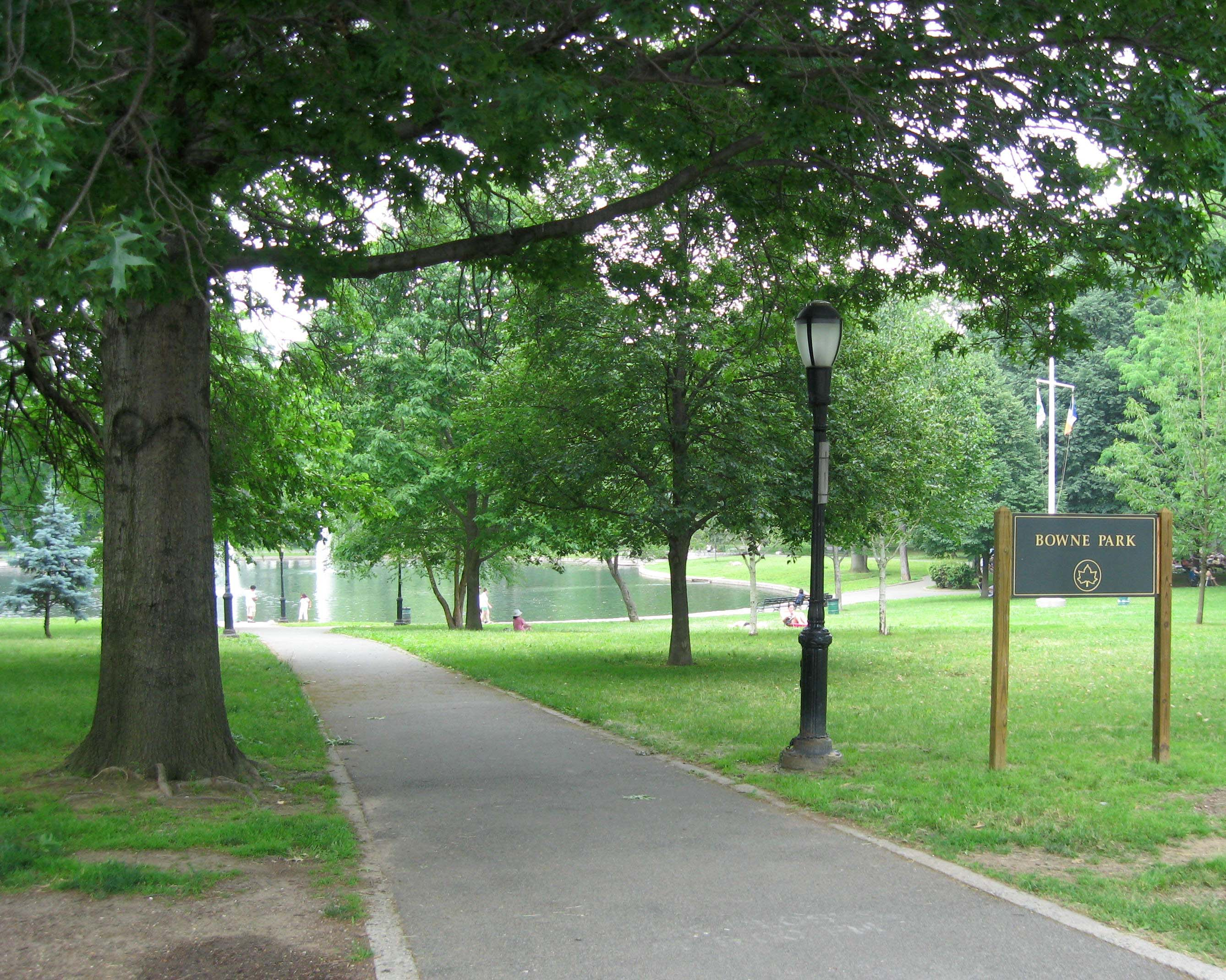
Bowne Park

John Bowne later served in the provincial assembly of New York, dying in Flushing on 20 December 1695.

== Family ==
John Bowne's first wife Hannah Feake (or Feke) was the daughter of Elizabeth Fones. They had 8 children.

John Bowne's second wife was Hannah Bickerstaff (married 2 February 1679/1680) and had 6 children (2 died soon after birth).

John Bowne's third wife was Mary Cock (married 26 June 1693) and had two children.

== Descendants ==
Bowne's descendants played notable roles in all aspects of life in America, from politics to business and academia. They include:

- Robert Bowne (1744–1818), founder in 1775 of Bowne & Co., the company with the longest history of trading on the New York Stock Exchange
- Samuel S. Bowne (1800–1865), U.S. Representative for the 19th District in New York
- Walter Bowne (1770–1846), Mayor of New York City.
- Daniel M. Frost (1823–1900), one of the few Northern Generals to fight with the Confederacy during the Civil War
- Thomas Jaggar (1871–1953), volcanologist and founder of the Hawaiian Volcano Observatory
- Robert Bowne Minturn (1805–1866), 19th Century merchant and shipper
- Iain Murray, 10th Duke of Atholl (1931–1996), Scottish peer and landowner
- Kyra Sedgwick, actress
- Margaret Suckley (1891–1991), archivist for, and confidant of, President Franklin D. Roosevelt
- Julia Thorne (1944–2006), 20th-century author and wife of John Kerry

== Legacy ==
John Bowne High School, PS 20 John Bowne Elementary School, and Bowne Street in Flushing, Queens are named in his honor. Bowne Park is named after his descendant, New York City mayor Walter Bowne, whose country estate once occupied the site.

The Bowne House at Bowne Street and 37th Avenue in Flushing still stands, and is open to the public as a New York City designated landmark and a Registered Historic Place.

In October 2018, a memorial stone was unveiled and a lime tree planted on the corner of Lime Tree Road and Hurst Rise, Matlock, Derbyshire, the site of John Bowne's birthplace, Lime Tree Farm.

== See also ==
- Flushing Remonstrance
