= Broadway–Flushing, Queens =

Neighborhood in New York City

Broadway–Flushing
- Neighborhood of Queens
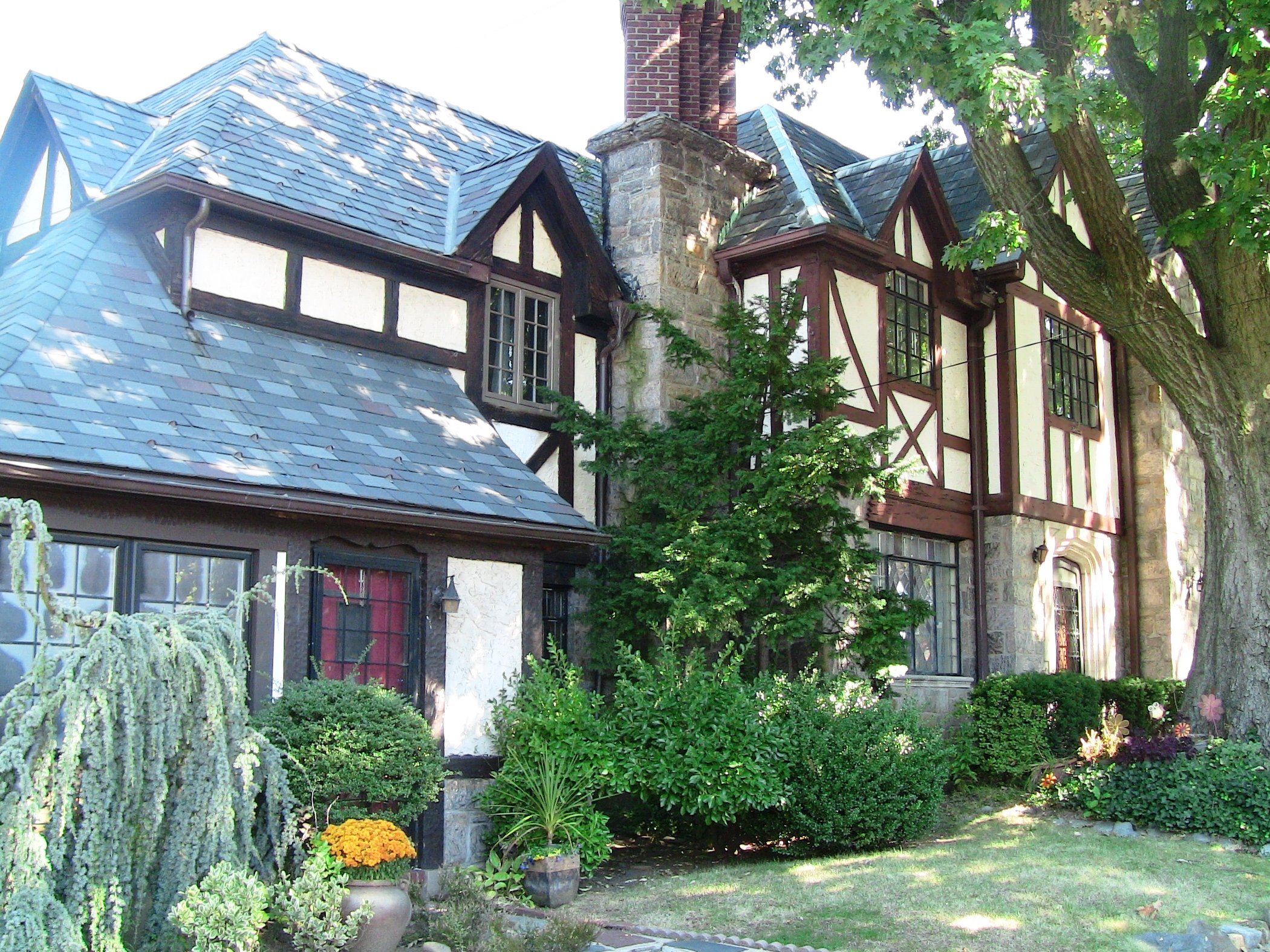
- Location within New York City
- Country: United States
- State: New York
- City: New York City
- County/Borough: Queens
- Community District: Queens 7
- Named for: Flushing, Netherlands (Vlissingen)

Population (2000)
  - Total: 10,000

Ethnicity
  - White: 78%
  - Black: 2%
  - Hispanic: 8%
  - Asian: 28%
  - Other: 0.7%

Economics
- ZIP Codes: 11354, 11358
- Area codes: 718, 347, 929, and 917
- Broadway–Flushing Historic District
- U.S. National Register of Historic Places
- U.S. Historic district
- Location within New York City Location within New York Location within the United States
- Location: Roughly bounded by 29th Ave., 163rd St., 32nd Ave., 192nd St., Crocheron Avenue, Northern Boulevard and 154th/155th Sts., Flushing, New York
- Coordinates: 40°45′48″N 73°48′12″W
- Area: 250.1 acres (101.2 ha)
- Built: 1906
- Architectural style: Early and Mid-20th Century American Eclectic Period
- NRHP reference No.: 06000373
- Added to NRHP: May 12, 2006

Broadway–Flushing is a historic district and residential subsection of Flushing, Queens, New York City. The neighborhood comprises approximately 2,300 homes. It is located between 155th and 170th Streets to the west and east respectively, and is bounded on the north by Bayside and 29th Avenues, and on the south by Northern Boulevard and Crocheron Avenue. Broadway–Flushing is listed on the National Register of Historic Places.

== History ==
Initially, this area was developed in 1906 by the Rickert-Finlay Realty Company, a major real estate development firm who also developed Bellcourt (1904) in Bayside, Douglas Manor (1906) and Westmoreland (1907) in Little Neck. Prior to its development as a residential area, the land north of Northern Boulevard (formerly known as Broadway) was the site of several farms and large landholdings, including the estate of Walter Bowne, the mayor of New York City during 1828–1832.

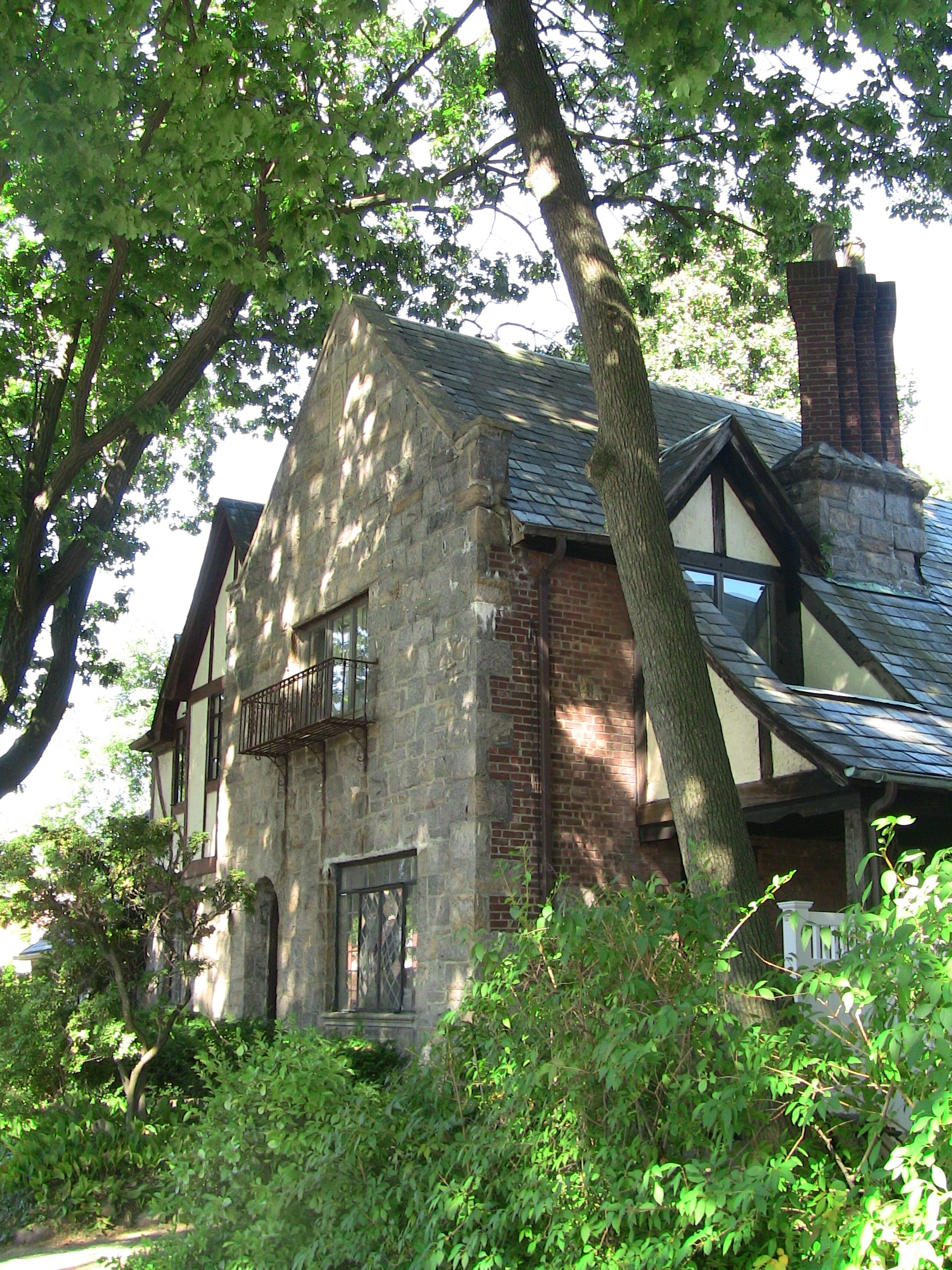
House in the historic district

Houses in Broadway–Flushing reflect many classic Revival styles from the Eclectic Period, most commonly Colonial and Tudor, as well as Arts and Crafts, American Foursquare and Art Deco, on relatively large properties. In order to preserve the park-like character of the neighborhood, the developer placed restrictive covenants on the properties that ban front yard fences, front-yard garages and flat roofs among other restrictions. In 1964, the Broadway–Flushing Homeowners Association was incorporated in New York State as a Not-For-Profit Corporation. This association of homeowners remains actively involved in the affairs of this community and has regular meetings between homeowners, business owners and government officials. The association continues to enforce the Rickert-Finlay restrictive covenants in order to protect their community from development that is not covered under New York City zoning or building ordinances. In large measure, the area is an excellent example of early to mid-20th Century development of a suburban enclave within an urban setting, or "rus en urbe" as described by urban planners of the period. As this neighborhood enters its second century, a small number of houses within the original Rickert-Finlay tract have been sold and redeveloped. Despite these changes, the neighborhood maintains its architectural integrity and a stately, suburban character.

=== Zoning and preservation ===
Since 1961, almost all of Broadway–Flushing has been designated as residential R1-2 and R2 zoning districts. The R1-2 designation required minimum lot sizes of 60 by 100 feet (18 by 30 m) while the R2 designation required minimum lot sizes of 40 by 100 feet (12 by 30 m). In 2005, in an effort to promote lower density development in this area, the Department of City Planning rezoned 11 blocks between Northern Boulevard/Crocheron Avenue and 35th Avenue from 156th to 167th streets in order to expand the size of the R1-2 zone in Broadway–Flushing, thereby removing the danger of subdivision for most properties in that area.

Broadway–Flushing was designated a Historic District by the New York State Historic Preservation Office on March 18, 2006. The Broadway–Flushing Historic District is a National and State Register historic district comprising 1,330 properties that include 1,790 contributing buildings and one contributing site, Bowne Park. It mostly consists of middle to upper middle class single family homes with a few two-family houses and several small apartment complexes and is representative of early to mid-20th century American architectural styles.

In 2009, the NYC Department of City Planning again revised the zoning for North Flushing, including Broadway–Flushing, and replaced the existing R1-2 and R2 zoning designations to new, lower density zoning designations, R1-2A and R2A, which are described as "anti-MacMansion" zones designed to limit the bulk, height and lot area of new development in order to better match the existing built environment. During the same time, the Landmarks Preservation Commission denied an application by the Broadway–Flushing Homeowners Association to designate Broadway–Flushing as a New York City landmark historic district.

== Parks ==
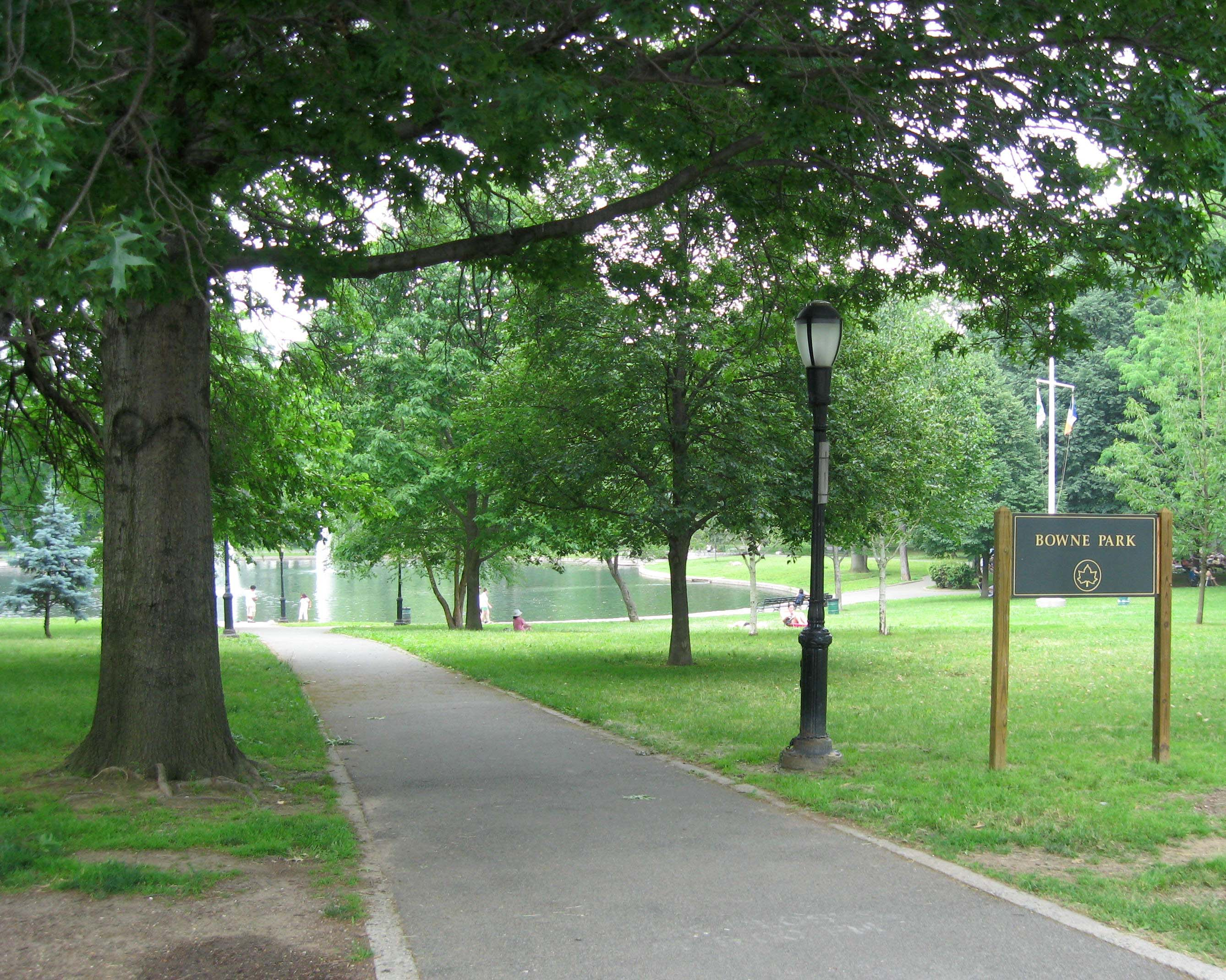
Bowne Park as seen from the northeast corner of 155th Street and 32nd Avenue.

Bowne Park, a popular 11-acre (45,000 m^{2}) park in western Broadway–Flushing, features a pond and dozens of oak trees that are over a century old. The park is located on what was part of the former site of the summer residence of Walter Bowne.

At Bayside Lane and 164th Street is Feehan Triangle, named in honor of a local firefighter killed on September 11, 2001.

== Transportation ==
The Broadway station of the Long Island Rail Road's Port Washington Branch is located at 162nd Street and Northern Boulevard, within walking distance from most homes in this neighborhood. In addition, the Q12, Q13, Q16, Q28, Q65 and N20G, N20X buses travel to downtown Flushing where there is a connection to the New York City Subway's 7 and <7> trains at Flushing–Main Street.
