= Flushing Remonstrance =

1657 petition to Peter Stuyvesant

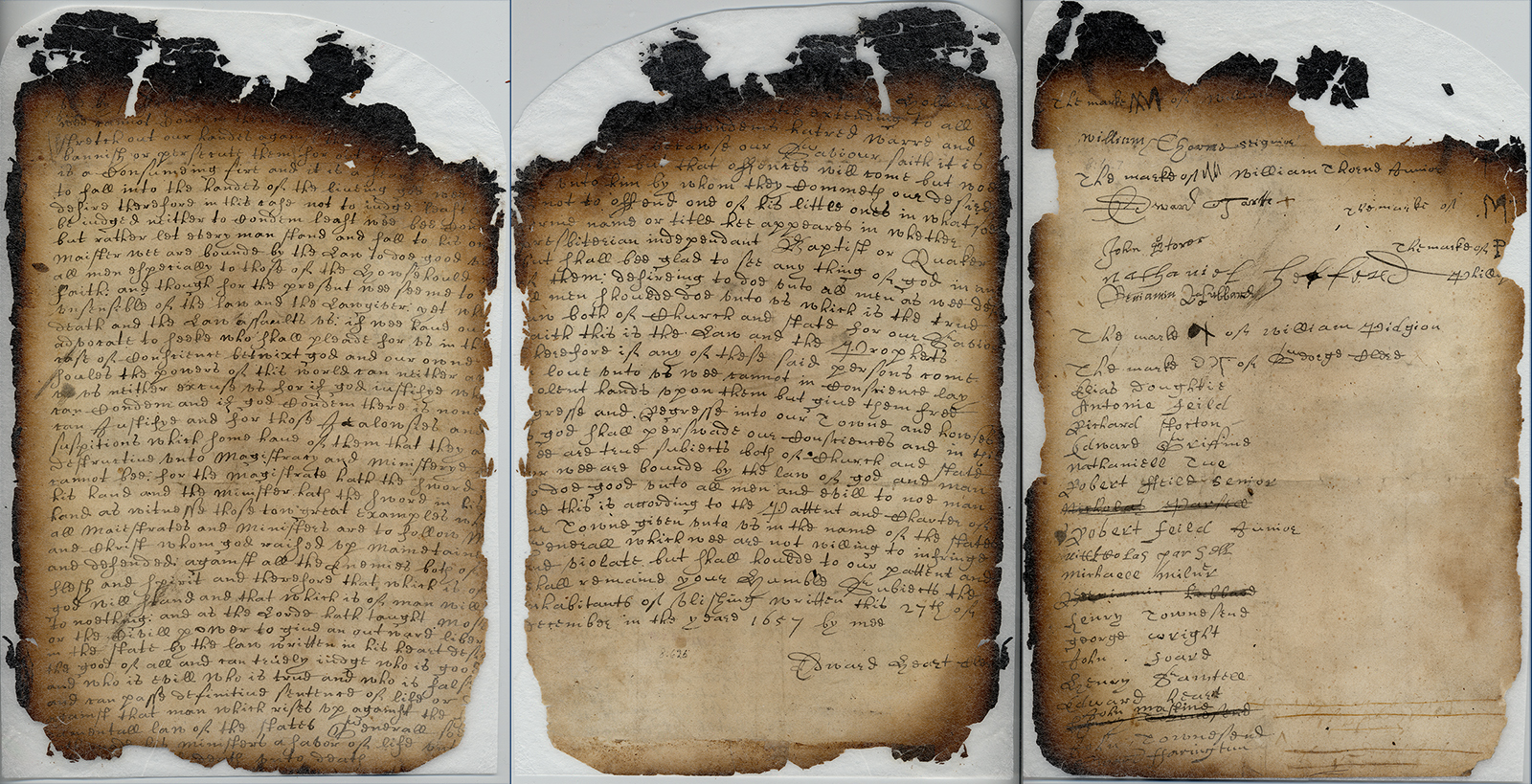
Scan of the original petition of 1657

The Flushing Remonstrance was a 1657 petition to Director-General of New Netherland Peter Stuyvesant, in which some thirty residents of the small settlement at Flushing requested an exemption to his ban on Quaker worship. It is considered a precursor to the United States Constitution's provision on freedom of religion in the Bill of Rights.

== Background ==
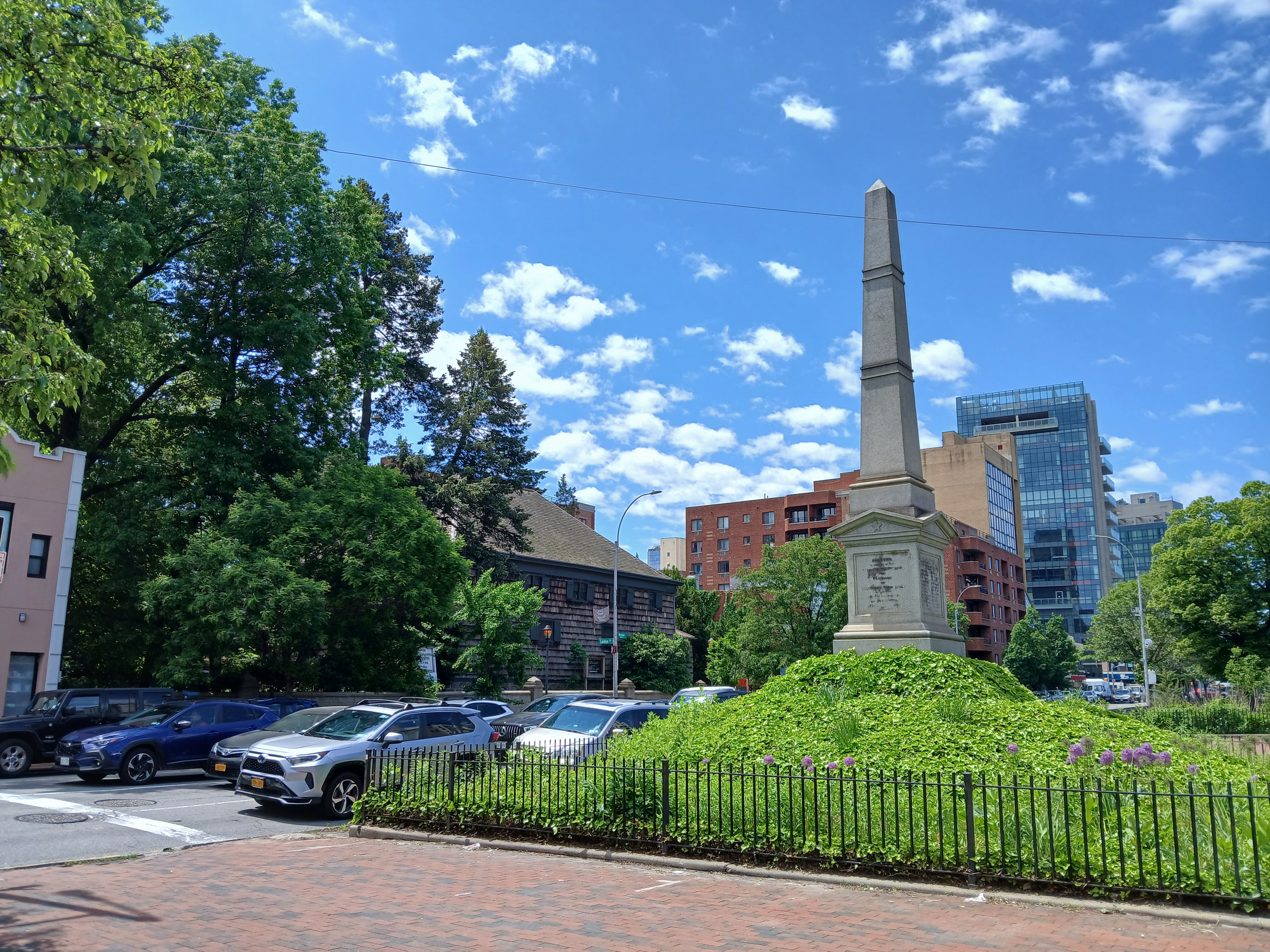
Flushing Green in 2025

In 1645, New Netherland governor Willem Kieft granted a patent to a group of English colonists from the New England Colonies to settle in the colony. The majority of the colonists settled in the newly established colonial settlement of Vlissingen. Kieft's patent granted the English colonists, most of them non-Anglican Protestants, the same freedom of religion which existed in the Dutch Republic, which was one of the most religiously tolerant nations in Europe.

Eleven years later, in 1656, the colony's new governor, Peter Stuyvesant, issued an ordinance which formally proscribed all religious congregations that were not part of the Dutch Reformed Church (including the various forms of Protestantism practiced by the English colonists). Stuyvesant's ordinance, which was immensely controversial in the colony, stood in contrast to the century-long development of religious tolerance in the Dutch Republic. During this period, the Dutch were revolting against Spanish rule, rebelling against an imposed Inquisition, attempting to form a national identity, and trying to unify Calvinist and Catholic provinces. The Dutch toleration debates were heated and full of political intrigue, sometimes even culminating in assassination.

Scholar Thomas Broderick argues that "we cannot see the Flushing Remonstrance through our modern notions of the Bill of Rights and freedom of religion. Rather, we must understand it as a document unique to the 17th century Dutch experience" and concludes that "the true Dutch legacy is not one of toleration but of discussion."

Stuyvesant's policy was not very different from the one evolving in the Netherlands: an official recognition of the Dutch Reformed Church bundled with broad tolerance within the church and a policy of connivance, turning a blind eye to non-conformist religious practices. At the same time, Stuyvesant opposed Jewish arrival in New Amsterdam. On another front, the Stuyvesant family was broadly tolerant. Judith, Stuyvesant's wife, was a fierce advocate for New York's slaves, promoting the practice of baptism as a first step toward freedom.

His policy met with resistance from many English colonists in Vlissingen, Rustdorp and 's-Gravesande, all of which had been host to previous Quaker missions. Stuyvesant's actions, however, also met with the support of other English colonists, including local magistrates, who informed on those embracing unorthodox teachings and meeting in small and unsanctioned religious meetings of lay people called conventicles. Thus, Stuyvesant found himself drawn into the religious debates of the English Atlantic World and debates in England which culminated in the Conventicle Act 1664.

This policy resulted in numerous acts of religious persecution and harassment. In 1656, William Wickenden, a Baptist minister from Rhode Island, and William Hallett, Sheriff of Flushing, were arrested by Dutch colonial authorities, jailed, fined, and exiled for baptizing Christians in Flushing. In the same year Robert Hodgson was arrested, tried, and sentenced to two years of manual labor with slaves for his preaching of Quakerism.

In 1661, in the town of Rustdorp, Henry Townsend (Norwich) and Samuel Spicer were fined for holding Quaker conventicles and Townsend was banished as well. Stuyvesant sent three new magistrates, all English colonists, and six colonial militiamen to gather information on dissidents. The militiamen were billeted in the homes of the dissidents until they agreed to conform. In 1662, in 's-Gravesande, Samuel Spicer and his mother, Micha, along with John and Mary Tilton, were imprisoned and later banished. They moved to Oyster Bay, then outside of the authority of New Netherland, and returned to their town after 1664 when the English took control of the colony.

== Events ==
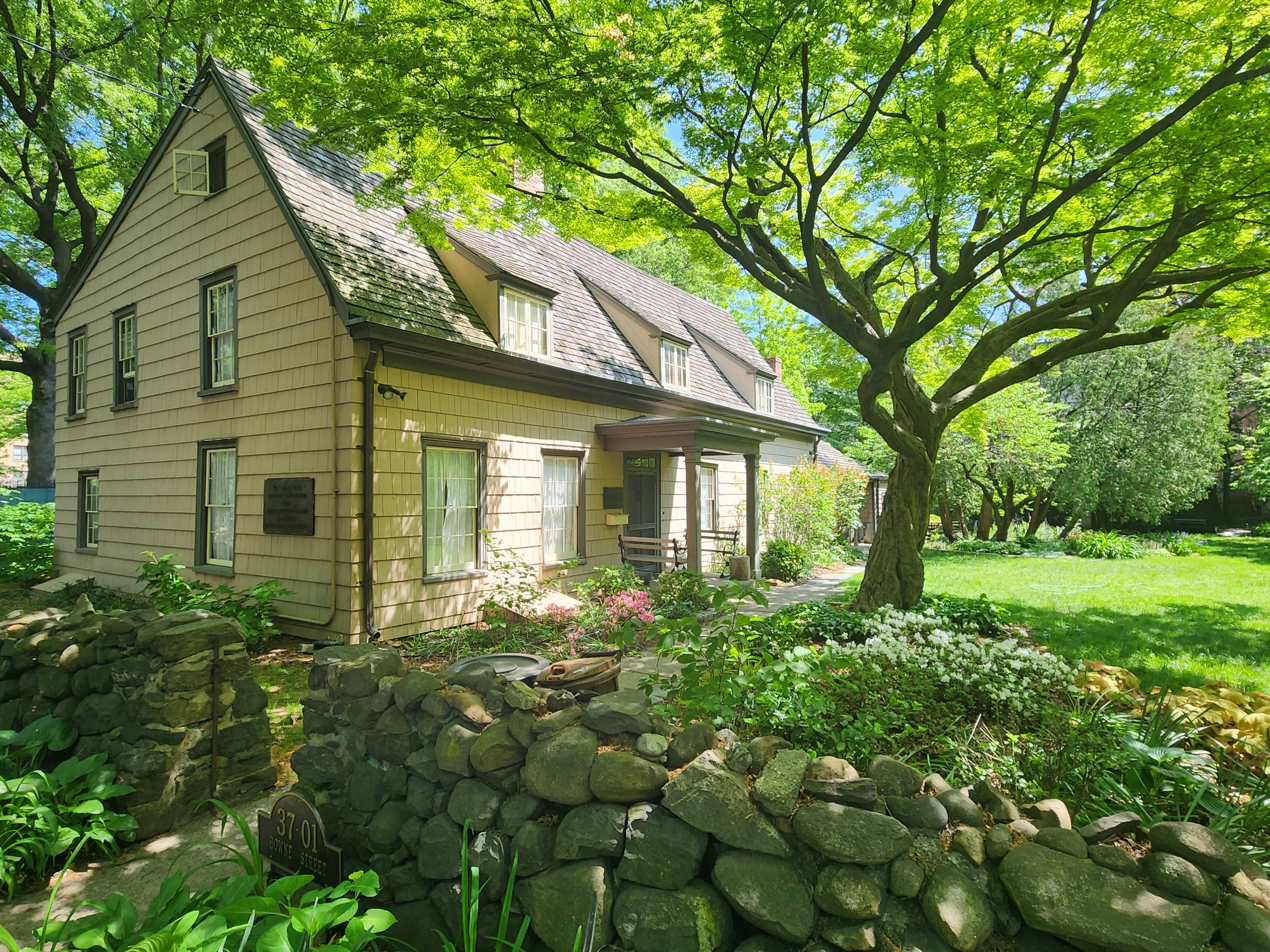
John Bowne House on 16 May 2023

The Flushing Remonstrance was signed at the home of Edward Hart, the town clerk, on December 27, 1657, by a group of Dutch citizens who were affronted by persecution of Quakers and the religious policies of Stuyvesant. None of them were Quakers. The site of the signing is presently occupied by the former State Armory, now a police facility, on the south side of Northern Boulevard between Linden Place and Union Street. The Remonstrance ends with:

The law of love, peace and liberty in the states extending to Jews, Turks and Egyptians, as they are considered sonnes of Adam, which is the glory of the outward state of Holland, soe love, peace and liberty, extending to all in Christ Jesus, condemns hatred, war and bondage. And because our Saviour sayeth it is impossible but that offences will come, but woe unto him by whom they cometh, our desire is not to offend one of his little ones, in whatsoever form, name or title hee appears in, whether Presbyterian, Independent, Baptist or Quaker, but shall be glad to see anything of God in any of them, desiring to doe unto all men as we desire all men should doe unto us, which is the true law both of Church and State; for our Saviour sayeth this is the law and the prophets.

Therefore if any of these said persons come in love unto us, we cannot in conscience lay violent hands upon them, but give them free egresse and regresse unto our Town, and houses, as God shall persuade our consciences, for we are bounde by the law of God and man to doe good unto all men and evil to noe man. And this is according to the patent and charter of our Towne, given unto us in the name of the States General, which we are not willing to infringe, and violate, but shall houlde to our patent and shall remaine, your humble subjects, the inhabitants of Vlishing.

In response Stuyvesant dismissed the local government and chose new Dutch replacements as leaders. Four who signed were arrested by order of Stuyvesant. Two immediately recanted, but the writer of the remonstrance, Edward Hart, and sheriff of Flushing Tobias Feake remained firm in their convictions. Both men were remanded to prison where they survived in isolation on rations of bread and water for over a month. After friends and family petitioned Stuyvesant on behalf of the elderly Hart, the clerk was released on penalty of banishment. Feake held out for a few more weeks, but eventually recanted and was pardoned after being fined and banned from holding public office.

Stuyvesant asserted that he was not violating the signers' "freedom of conscience", only their right to worship outside of family prayer meetings. In addition he proclaimed March 13, 1658 a Day of Prayer for the purpose of repenting from the sin of religious tolerance.

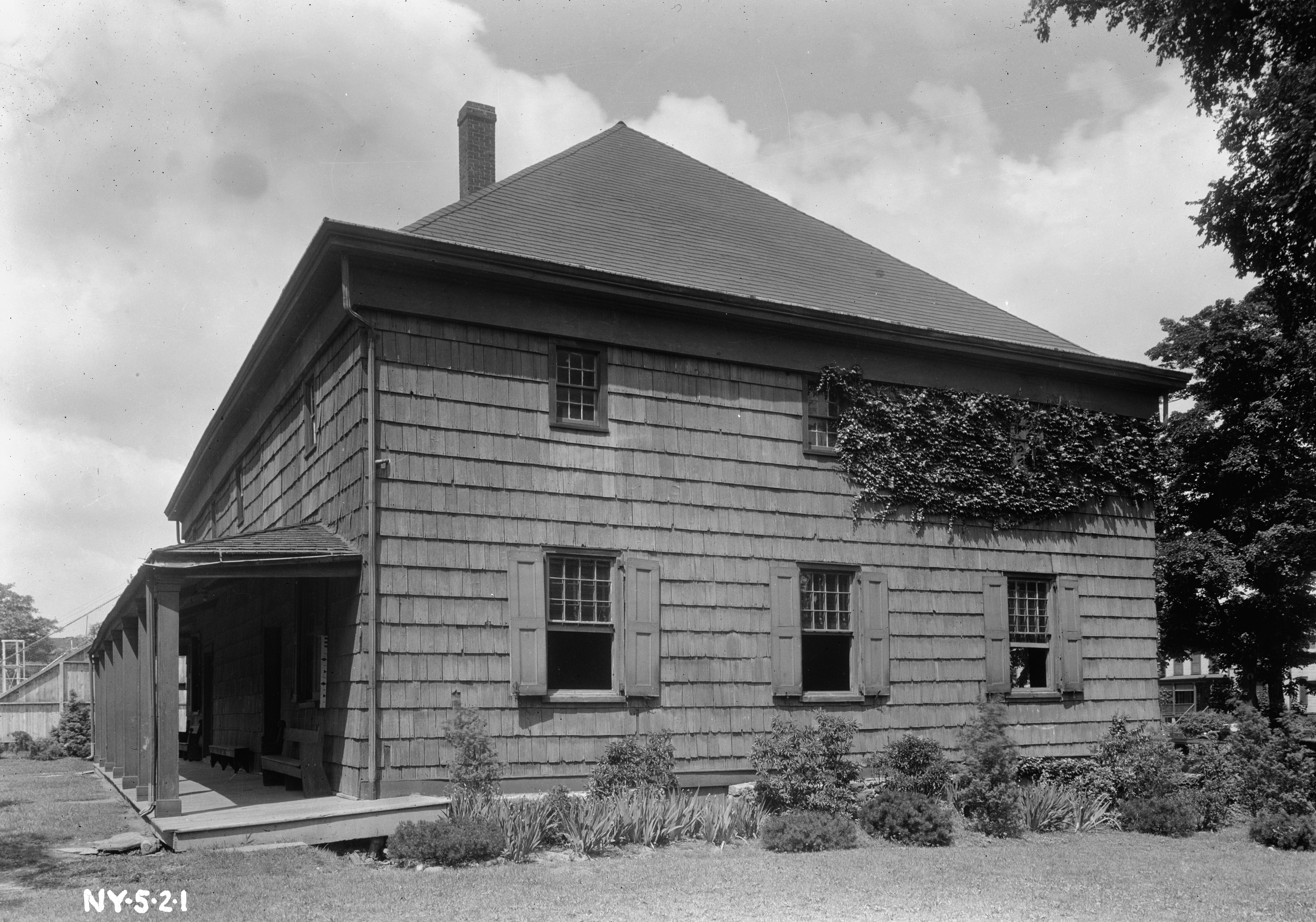
Society of Friends Meetinghouse on Northern Boulevard in Flushing

Subsequently, John Bowne of the colony allowed Quakers to meet in his house. He was arrested in 1662 and brought before Stuyvesant. Unrepentant, Bowne was sentenced to banishment to the Dutch Republic, though he was of English descent and spoke no Dutch. After several months in Europe, Bowne petitioned the directors of the Dutch West India Company. After a month of deliberation, the Dutch West India Company agreed to support Bowne, and advised Stuyvesant by a letter (1663) that he was to end religious persecution in the colony. One year later, in 1664, the colony was captured by English forces. The John Bowne House, built before 1662, still stands in historic preservation.

The Quaker Meeting House in Flushing, built 1694, is now the oldest house of worship in continuous use in New York State.

== Signers ==
The 30 signers were:

- Nicolas Blackford
- George Clere
- Elias Doughtie
- Edward Farrington, magistrate
- Tobias Feake, sheriff
- Antonie Field
- Robert Field, Sr.
- Robert Field, Jr.
- John Foard
- Edward Griffin
- Edward Hart
- Nathaniel Hefferd
- Benjamin Hubbard
- John Mastine
- Michael Milner
- William Noble, magistrate
- Nicholas Parsell
- William Pidgion
- Henry Semtell
- Richard Stockton
- John Store
- Edward Tarne
- William Thorne Sr.
- William Thorne, Jr.
- John Townsend
- Henry Townsend
- Nathaniel Tue
- Micah Tue
- Phillip Udall
- George Wright

Hart signed first as clerk of the group; each of several other signers wrote an X that is labeled as their mark.

== Account of John Bowne ==
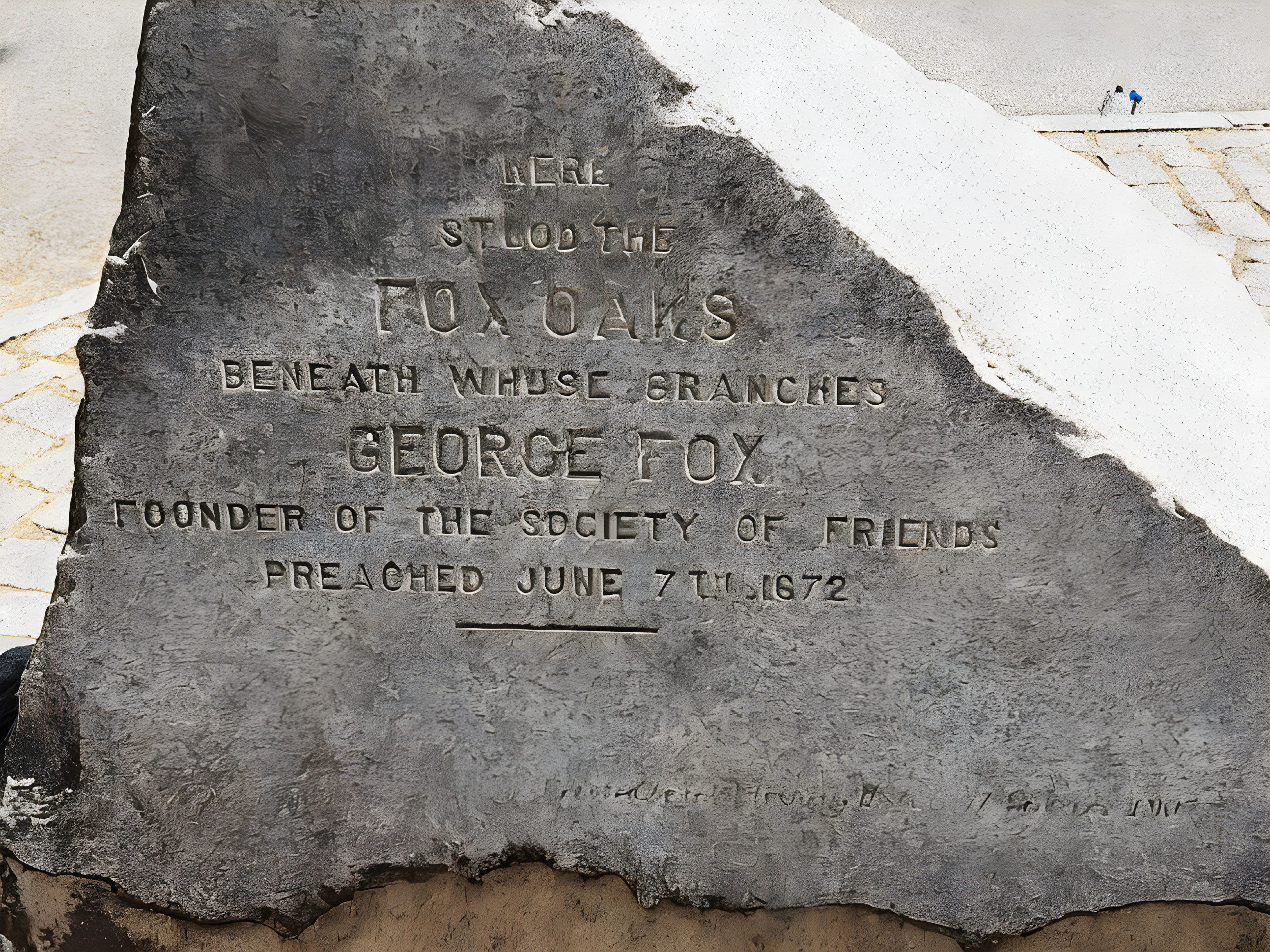
FoxOaksStone engraved side

John Bowne's account of the Flushing Remonstrance and its aftermath is found in his journal of events. Bowne, who had arrived in 1651, soon began to host Quaker meetings in his home, although he did not convert until 1659. He was to become a leader of American Quakers and a correspondent of Quaker founder George Fox.

== Later history ==
The earliest version of the document in English dates also from 1657 as an official copy of the original, but the original, likely in Dutch, has been lost. This early handwritten copy suffered singeing in the burning of the New York State Capitol in 1911, yet remains essentially complete. It has seldom been in public anywhere.

The Queens Borough President's Office held a celebration of the 350th anniversary of the Remonstrance in 2007. Descendants of the signers, Bowne, Stuyvesant, and the arresting officer were invited and in attendance, and the original copy of the Remonstrance was brought down from the State Archives in Albany for several weeks' public display.

Bowne Park, John Bowne High School, and an elementary school in Flushing, Queens are named in John Bowne's honor.

PS 21 in Flushing is named after Edward Hart, the writer of the Remonstrance.

== See also ==
- Jewish arrival in New Amsterdam
- Remonstrants
