= Feehan Triangle =

Green space in Queens, New York

Coordinates: 40°46′20.6″N 73°48′1.23″W

William M. Feehan Triangle
- Interactive map of William M. Feehan Triangle
- Type: Public
- Location: Broadway-Flushing, Queens, New York
- Area: 0.032 acres (130 m^{2})
- Owned by: City of New York

William M. Feehan Triangle is a 0.032-acre (130 m^{2}) public green space in the Broadway-Flushing neighborhood of Queens, New York. It is bound by Bayside Lane, 164th Street, and 27th Avenue.

== Overview ==
The triangle's shape is the result of the street grid imposed on the once-rural landscape of Flushing in the 1920s. Bayside Lane predates the grid, cutting across its numbered streets and avenues in a diagonal path. The park is landscaped with trees and shrubs.

In 2002, the New York City Council passed legislation to name the triangle for William M. Feehan.

=== Name ===
This triangle honors William M. Feehan (1929–2001) who once lived near this triangle. Feehan was the First Deputy Commissioner of the New York City Fire Department (FDNY) at the time of the September 11, 2001, attacks on the World Trade Center. A son of a firefighter, Feehan was born in Long Island City and graduated from Saint John's University in 1952. His studies were interrupted for military service during the Korean War. In 1959, he was accepted into the Fire Department for what became his career, and rose through every rank of FDNY over the course of nearly four decades. On September 11, 2001, Feehan was the oldest among the 343 FDNY personnel who died.

== See also ==
- Doughboy Park
