= Edward Hart (settler) =

- Known for: Early settler of American colonies who drew up the Flushing Remonstrance

Edward Hart was an early settler of the American Colonies who, as town clerk, wrote the Flushing Remonstrance, a precursor to the United States Constitution's provision on freedom of religion in the Bill of Rights.

== Early life ==
Little is known with any degree of certainty regarding Edward Hart's life before 1640. Genealogical sources give place and date of birth, year and manner of emigration to North America, and first places of residence within the American colonies, but none provide documentary evidence for their assertions. (Note: On this topic see also Andrews's Genealogical history of Deacon Stephen Hart and his descendants which says that Edmund Hart, probable brother of Stephen, was one of the first settlers of Dorchester, having lived there from 1632. Edward Hart is said to have moved from Dorchester to Weymouth, Massachusetts, in 1634 or 1636 and to Farmington, Connecticut, the following year, but this was also likely to have been Edmund. On Edward in Dorchester and Weymouth see Robertson's Profiles of the signers of the Flushing Remonstrance, December 27, 1657 and the Hart Memorial. For the likelihood that Edmund is meant see Whittmore's Genealogical Guide to the Early Settlers of America, Pope's The pioneers of Massachusetts, a descriptive list, drawn from records of the colonies, towns and churches and other contemporaneous documents, Holmes's Directory of the ancestral heads of New England families, 1620-1700, and the source used by Singleton: Genealogical history of Deacon Stephen Hart and his descendants, 1632. 1875: with an introduction of miscellaneous Harts and their progenitors, as far as known; to which is added a list of all the clergy of the name found, all the physicians, all the lawyers, the authors, and soldiers by Alfred Andrews (New Britain, Connecticut, Hart, Austin, 1875).) A man named Edward Hart was one of the early settlers of Rhode Island having obtained a plot of land from Roger Williams and signed an agreement for the government of Providence in 1640. This man married a woman named Margaret whose surname is unknown. There is no definite evidence that this Edward Hart is the same as the Edward Hart of Flushing, Long Island, but sources generally accept that he is.

== Founding settler of Flushing ==
Although there is some level of uncertainty about his prior whereabouts, there is no doubt that on October 10, 1645, Hart was one of 18 men who received a charter from the Dutch governor of New Netherland, William Kieft, to establish the town of Vlissingen (i.e., Flushing) in Long Island. (Note: In addition to Edward Hart the charter establishing Flushing lists Thomas Applegate, Thomas Beddard, Lawrence Dutch, Robert Field, Thomas Farrington, Robert Firman, John Hicks, John Lawrence, William Lawrence, John Marston, Michael Millard, William Pidgeon, Thomas Stiles, Thomas Saul, Henry Sawtelle, John Townsend, and William Thorn.) Three of these men came to Flushing from Rhode Island and may have known Hart there. The others, so far as is known, came from Massachusetts, Connecticut, or other towns in Long Island. (Note: Applegate, Field, and Hicks came to Flushing from Rhode Island; Stiles from Connecticut, the Lawrences and Thorn from Long Island, and the rest from Massachusetts so far as is known.)

In 1642, after efforts to attract Dutch immigrants had disappointing results, the administration in New Netherland and its parent governors in Amsterdam began to accept applications from English settlers to form towns on Long Island. These settlers brought with them the forms of government common in the settlements of New England. Based on practices common in English towns, these were generally more liberal than the ones granted to New Netherland's Dutch communities and the charter granted to the applicants from Flushing was no exception. (Note: In granting unusual privileges to settlers from New England the administration in New Amsterdam expected to gain revenue from taxes, manpower for defense against the predations of unfriendly Indians, and local resistance to encroachments by the administrators of New England colonies.) Having obtained privileges of self-government that were not granted to the towns where Dutch settlers resided, the settlers from New England were energetic in defending and where possible expanding these rights against efforts of the administration in New Amsterdam to erode them.

In 1648 Hart, as one of Flushing's landholders, joined with four other men to protest the payment of tithes to the pastor of a state-sponsored church and to question the manner of choosing the town's sole magistrate, the schout, who acted as court officer, prosecutor, and sheriff. On January 17 of that year the government of New Netherland, now headed by Peter Stuyvesant summoned the five men to answer for this resistance to the authorities in New Netherland and ordered them to accept the Dutch method for electing their schout.

Stuyvesant did not relent in his efforts to require the inhabitants of Flushing to support a pastor of his choosing nor did he change the method for electing a schout. However, a few months later he expanded local government by granting the town's freeholders the right to elect three additional magistrates, called schepen, and a clerk. The election of the officials would be subject to confirmation by the New Netherland government but in practice the town's nominations of its officials were routinely accepted. (Note: The frequency of elections was not stipulated but is understood to have been annual. In the first election following this change in the town's charter John Underhill was named schout; John Townsend, John Hicks, and William Thorne were named schepen; and John Lawrence was named clerk. Although one source says that Hart was elected to the position of town clerk on April 27, 1648, that source does not cite evidence, and other sources which do give evidence maintain that John Lawrence, was elected at that time. Flushing and other towns in New Netherland nominated officials for approval by authorities in New Amsterdam. The form is given in a council minute of March 25, 1656.) Although there is some doubt about the names and terms of early clerks, it is certain that Hart was clerk in 1656 for in July of that year he signed himself clerk in responding on behalf of the town's schout and schaepens to a demand from the New Netherland government for payment of a tenth of the town's agricultural production as annual tax as provided in its charter. Hart's letter said that Flushing was "willing to do that which is reasonable and honest" and proposed an amount of produce ("fiftie scipple of peas and twentie-five of wheat") which was apparently acceptable. That he continued as clerk in 1657 is shown by a letter of his dated January 23, 1657, affirming the town's rights and privileges and complaining that the neighboring town of Hempstead was encroaching on its lands.

== Writer of the Flushing Remonstrance ==
The next document bearing Hart's signature as clerk is the famous Flushing Remonstrance of December 27, 1657. The towns settled by immigrants from New England were generally granted charters recognizing their right to freedom of conscience but not freedom of religion. In the case of Flushing, the relevant clause granted the original patentees the right "to have and Enjoy the Liberty of Conscience, according of Religion; to the Custome and manner of Holland, without molestacōn or disturbance, from any Magistrate or Magistrates, or any other Ecclesiasticall Minister, that may extend Jurisdiccōn over them." In practice this meant that men would not be prosecuted for religious practices that did not strongly contradict those of the Dutch Reformed Church which was the official public church in Holland. It also meant that personal beliefs that were contrary to the tenets of the established church would be tolerated so long as they were kept private and expressed only in the narrow circle of the family. Meetings for the public expression of dissenting worship would be prosecuted. Although the early settlers of Flushing complied with these strictures, some of them came into conflict with Stuyvesant and the New Netherland government when charismatic speakers began to come among them proclaiming nonconformist beliefs. (Note: In 1656 a prominent Baptist minister, William Wickenden, was banished and fined for holding illegal religious gatherings and baptizing adult Christians in Flushing. A year later three Quakers were sent away from Manhattan for public preaching and one of them, Robert Hodgson, moved on to Long Island where some of the inhabitants, including residents of Flushing, gave him a warm welcome. Arrested once again, he refused to acknowledge that he had done wrong and would not perform hard labor to which he had been sentenced. As punishment he was treated very severely: put in solitary confinement, beaten, and tortured.) Believing that Quakers posed the most serious threat to religious and civil tranquility, the administration in New Amsterdam proclaimed that any person who took a Quaker into his home, even for a single night, would be fined fifty pounds and that any ships bringing any Quaker into the province would be confiscated. The schout, magistrates, of Flushing, along with twenty-eight other freeholders of that town and two from neighboring Jamaica recognized that they could not, in conscience, obey this regulation and signed a protest, the Remonstrance, explaining why they could not comply. The document says Quakers are not seducers of the people nor are they "destructive unto magistracy and ministers" but—along with Presbyterians, Independents, and Baptists—are members of the "household of faith" who, when they "come unto us, we cannot in conscience lay violent hands upon them, but give them free ingress and egress unto our town and houses, so as God shall persuade our consciences." It closes by saying that the signatories "desire to be true subjects both of church and state" according to the law of God and also to the provisions of the town's charter.

The collections of colonial documents of this period contain many protests against government actions, but none of such historic import or eloquence of expression as this. The Remonstrance "concretely illustrates the seventeenth century practice of speaking Scripture" and is "an unusually rich display of rhetoric and fine English style." It gives forceful religious arguments for tolerance of other religions and the separation of church and state. Nonetheless, it is framed on Dutch law, adheres closely to legal forms, and contains nothing that might be construed as politically rebellious.

== Government response to the Remonstrance ==
The signers of the Remonstrance followed correct procedure in having the town schout, Tobias Feake, submit it to the provincial schout, Nicasius de Sille. De Sille passed it on to Stuyvesant who immediately ordered de Sille to arrest and imprison Feake. (Note: The provincial schout—officially called Schout-Fiscal and informally called Fiscal—functioned as attorney general and sheriff.) (Note: There is greater than usual variation in the spelling of the name Feake. Contemporary documents render it as Fecco, Feaks, Feakes, ffeake, Feeque, and Feakx.) (Note: Nicasius de Sille was the son of a prominent statesman of the same name.) A few days later—January 1, 1658—he also ordered the arrest of two of the town's magistrates, Thomas Farrington and William Noble, (Note: Thomas Farrington was one of the original patentees of Flushing. He was elected schaepen in 1655, 1656, 1657, and 1661. William Noble (or Nobel) had been born in Flushing and was in his mid-30s when first elected schaepen in 1656. He was re-elected to that office in 1657, 1661, 1662, and 1664.) and on January 3 he summoned Hart to testify. Under examination by Stuyvesant and two councilors, Hart said that the Remonstrance contained the sentiments of the community as expressed in a town meeting, that some who were not present at the meeting signed afterward, and that he did not know who called the meeting or who had drafted the document for the community's consideration. (Note: Peter Tonneman served as schout and secretary of Brooklyn as well as provincial councilor and schout.) (Note: On January 8 Stuyvesant and the council granted a petition from Farrington and Noble to be released from prison so long as they did not leave Manhattan. Having received from them a letter of apology in which they claimed they had been misled and promised future good conduct, he granted them pardons provided they to pay court costs. In releasing them the council noted that they acknowledged their error and concluded that they had "been misled by the Schout Tobias Feakx." Asked whether they would continue to serve as magistrates in Flushing, the council said it had not yet decided and asked for important matters to be referred to themselves if any arose.) Having suffered imprisonment for three weeks Hart wrote the governor and council on January 28 requesting to be released. He acknowledged no offense and made no excuse for writing the Remonstrance but begged mercy and consideration for his "poore estate and Condition" and promised that he would "indeavor hereafter to walke inoffensively." The council responded the same day. The record of its decision says something about his performance as town clerk and his standing in the community:

In Council received and read the foregoing petition of the imprisoned Clerk of Vlissingen, Edward Hart, and having considered his verbal promises of better behavior and the mediation of some inhabitants of said village, also that he has always been an efficient officer and as an old resident is well acquainted with divers matters; further whereas the Schout Tobias Feakx has advised him to draw up the remonstrance recorded on the first of January and he is burdened with a large family, The Director-General and Council forgive and pardon his error this time on condition of his paying the costs and misses of law.

On March 26 the director-general and council passed an ordinance intended to prevent the town from ever again submitting a "seditious and mutinous" document like the Remonstrance. Saying that "all the late Schouts successively have manifested no small negligence," it added new qualifications for the office aimed at obtaining persons "better versed in Dutch Practice, and somewhat conversant in both languages, the English and Dutch." It also prohibited town meetings for conducting ordinary business and, in their place, instituted a town council consisting of seven persons to assist the schout and magistrates and it required the town to acquire and maintain "an Orthodox Minister" to conduct religious services.

== Responsibility for the Remonstrance ==
Hart gave somewhat inconsistent statements in his interrogation by Stuyvesant, de Sille, and Tonneman, saying first that he drew up the Remonstrance on the order of those who signed it in order to record the "opinion of the people" of the town and then saying that he had prepared it before the town meeting at which he submitted it for consideration. He pleaded ignorance concerning the responsibility of any specific individuals as instigators prior to the town meeting. Pressed to explain his inconsistent testimony he said the draft he prepared prior to the meeting contained "what he thought to be the opinion of the people." The questions submitted to Hart show that Stuyvesant and the two councilors suspected that the four town officials who signed the document (the schout, two magistrates, and Hart) bore primary responsibility for it. After interrogating the two magistrates and after the two of them and Hart had submitted apologies for their actions, the governor and councilors settled on the schout as mainly responsible. Although they singled out Feake for punishment, the ordinance they passed subsequent to the release from imprisonment and pardoning of the Hart and the magistrates maintains that all four of the town's officials were jointly at fault. It says that most of the men who signed the Remonstrance were "urged to subscribe by the previous signatures of the Schout, Clerk and some Magistrates."

Historians who have considered this subject have not agreed about who took the lead in preparing the Remonstrance and, as a result, it is not known which of its signers most inspired its moving appeal for freedom of conscience. Some maintain that the schout, Feake, was mainly responsible. Others say it was mainly Hart's doing or that, at least, the language was his. One says that the four town officials were more or less equally responsible. Many accounts say that the responsibility was communal. (Note: Most sources take this view. See in particular New Netherland and the Dutch Origins of American Religious Liberty by Evan Haefeli (2013).) One author makes a case for a strong influence of Baptist beliefs among those who signed the document.

== Life of Edward Hart subsequent to the Remonstrance ==
There is little information about Hart following his pardoning and release from prison. In 1660 and 1661 his name appears as a witness on deeds for transfer of land and in the latter year he was listed as a tax collector in Flushing. On April 13, 1662, Hart wrote Stuyvesant on behalf of Flushing residents to request help in dealing with three Indians "who demand pay for the Land wee live vpon" and later that year (June 26) A man whose name is given as Eduart Hart obtained a translation from the Notary Public in New Amsterdam. After that there is no assured documentary evidence regarding him. The last references to a man who is supposed to have been Hart are in records of land transfer. In 1679 a man named Robert West acquired land originally owned by an Edward Hart in Providence, R.I. and in 1707 land formerly owned by him is referred to in a deed filed by a man named William Field. It is likely but not certain that this Edward Hart is the same as the one who wrote the Remonstrance.

== Family of Edward Hart ==
Hart's life after 1662 is described from inferences lacking a clear documentary trail. With his wife, Margaret, he is said to have had two sons, Thomas and Jonathan. Hart having returned to Rhode Island and then died, his wife is supposed to have remarried. (Note: Examples of these sources include a number of genealogical sites and the following monographs: Edward Hart; descendants and allied families by Clara Hart Kennedy (Bloomington, Ill., 1939) and Profiles of the signers of the Flushing Remonstrance, December 27, 1657 by Purcell B. Robertson (4 vols. typescript held in Queens Public Library, New York, N.Y.) For an instance of doubt about these suppositions see "The Ancestry of the Hon. John Hart, of Hopewell, N.J., Signer of the Declaration of Independence" by Frederick W. Bailey, in The New York Genealogical and Biographical Record, Volumes 25-26 (New York Genealogical and Biographical Society, 1894, New York).) Some genealogical and other sources say that Jonathan Hart died in Newtown, Long Island, in 1671, however Early Wills of Westchester County, New York, from 1664 to 1784 by William Smith Pelletreau (Francis P. Harper, New York, 1898) says that the family of one Monmouth Hart of Rye, New York, is descended from an Edmund Hart who signed the Flushing Remonstrance and that his son, Jonathan Hart, came to Rye in 1685 and subsequently married Hannah Budd. Thomas Hart is said to have married Freeborn Williams, a daughter of Roger Williams and this fact is supported by a note in The genealogical dictionary of Rhode Island by John Osborne Austin (Joel Munsells Sons, Albany, 1887). The note says that the Edward Hart who was granted land in Providence and subsequently signed the civil compact of 1640 was the husband of a woman named Margaret and the two were parents of a son named Thomas. It says that this son lived in Newport, Rhode Island, and was husband of Freeborn Williams, daughter of Roger Williams and his wife Mary. Although most sources accept that this Edward Hart is the same man as the one who drafted the Remonstrance, they offer no evidence to support their inference.

== Documentary evidence on the life of Edward Hart ==
In 1789 all the records of the town of Flushing were destroyed in a fire (Note: "The most important event of the closing years of the last century was the destruction of the town records by the burning of the residence of the clerk, Jeremiah Vanderbilt. It was set on fire by Nellie, a slave girl belonging to Capt. Daniel Braine, who had been hired to work in the family, and who, conceiving a dislike for her new mistress, took this way to revenge the fancied injury. She was arrested in company with Sarah, one of Vanderbilt's slaves, and on their own confession they were sentenced to be hanged. Sarah was afterwards reprieved on condition that she be removed from the island. Nellie was hanged at Jamaica, after having been in jail fifty weeks. Aaron Burr, then attorney-general for the State, conducted the prosecution.") and in 1911 a fire caused serious damage to the manuscripts of the New Netherland colony. (Note: "While many ... Dutch volumes were charred at the edges, they survived because they had been kept on shelves close to the floor, below the English volumes. When the fire caused the shelves to collapse, the Dutch books were buried under the English ones, which suffered far greater damage, many being completely destroyed. The surviving 17th century Colonial Manuscripts are being transcribed, translated and published in two series commenced in 1974, New Netherland Documents (formerly New York Historical Manuscripts: Dutch) and New York Historical Manuscripts: English.") Although no copies had been made of the Flushing documents and they were thus lost forever, many of the Dutch colonial documents had been transcribed and printed prior to the 1911 fire. (Note: See the Calendar of Historical Manuscripts in the Office of the Secretary of State (Weed, Parsons and Co., Albany, N.Y., 1865-66), Laws and Ordinances of New Netherland, 1638-1674 (Weed, Parsons and Co., Albany, N.Y., 1868), The Register of New Netherland, 1626 to 1674 (J. Munsell, Albany, N.Y., 1865), all edited by Edmund Bailey O'Callaghan, and Documents Relating to the History of the Early Colonial Settlements Principally on Long Island by B. Fernow (Weed, Parsons and Co., Albany, N.Y., 1883). Records of New Netherland in the New York City Clerks Office have been transcribed in "Dutch Records in the New York City Clerks Office (1651-1664)" (Holland Society Yearbook, 1900). Other documentary sources include Documentary History of Rhode Island by Howard M. Chapin (Plimpton Press, Norwood, Mass., 1916), The Home Lots of the Early Settlers of the Providence Plantations by Charles Wyman Hopkins (Genealogical Publishing Co., 2009), The early records of the town of Providence (Providence (R.I.). Record Commissioners, Providence, 1909), Annals of the Town of Providence: From Its First Settlement, to the Organization of the City Government, in June, 1832 by William Read Staples (Knowles and Vose, 1843), and Early Wills of Westchester County, New York, from 1664 to 1784 (Surrogate's Court, Westchester Co., N.Y., 1898).)
