= Eliza Southgate Bowne =

American writer

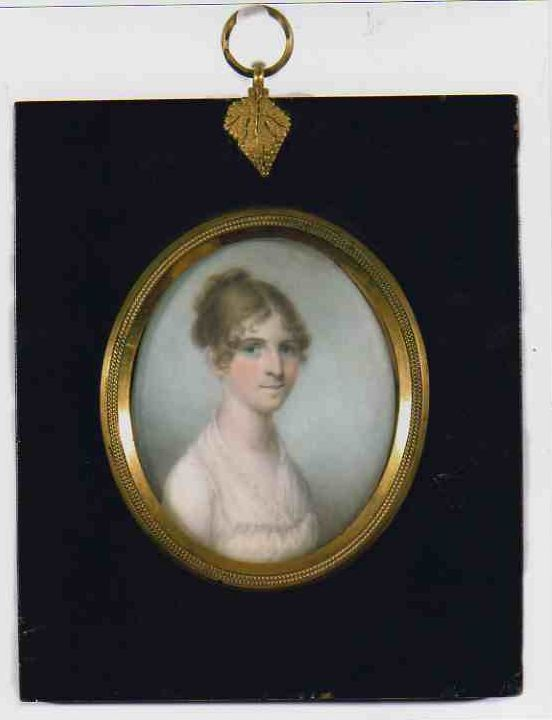
- portrait miniature by Edward Greene Malbone
- Born: September 24, 1783; Scarborough
- Died: February 20, 1809 (aged 25); Charleston
- Occupation: Correspondent
- Spouse(s): Walter Bowne
- Children: Mary King Lawrence
- Parent(s): Robert Southgate; Mary King Southgate

Eliza Southgate Bowne (September 24, 1783 – February 20, 1809) was an American letter writer whose letters were published after her death and have been frequently quoted and anthologized.

Eliza Southgate Bowne was born on September 24, 1783 in Scarborough, Massachusetts (it joined the new state of Maine in 1820). She was the daughter of Dr. Robert Southgate, a prominent physician, landowner, and judge, and Mary King Southgate, sister of the politician Rufus King. Bowne was educated at finishing schools in Boston and at Susanna Rowson's Young Ladies’ Academy in Medford, Massachusetts. On a trip to Saratoga Springs, New York, she met businessman Walter Bowne. They married in 1803, lived in New York City, and had two children, Walter Bowne, Jr., and Mary King Bowne. She died of tuberculosis in Charleston, South Carolina on February 20, 1809. After her death, Walter Bowne became the 59th Mayor of New York City in 1829.

Bowne wrote a series of letters to her cousin Moses Porter from March 1801 until July 1802, when Porter died while still a law student. The letters were preserved in the family and published in 1887 as A Girl’s Life Eighty Years Ago: Selections from the Letters of Eliza Southgate Bowne. They have been valued due to her evident intelligence and the insight they provide into the life and material culture of an upper-class teenager of the early 19th century. The letters also reveal that Bowne disputed conventional beliefs and expectations of women at the time and lamented her poor intellectual education compared to that received by men of the time.
