= Bowne Park =

Public park in Queens, New York

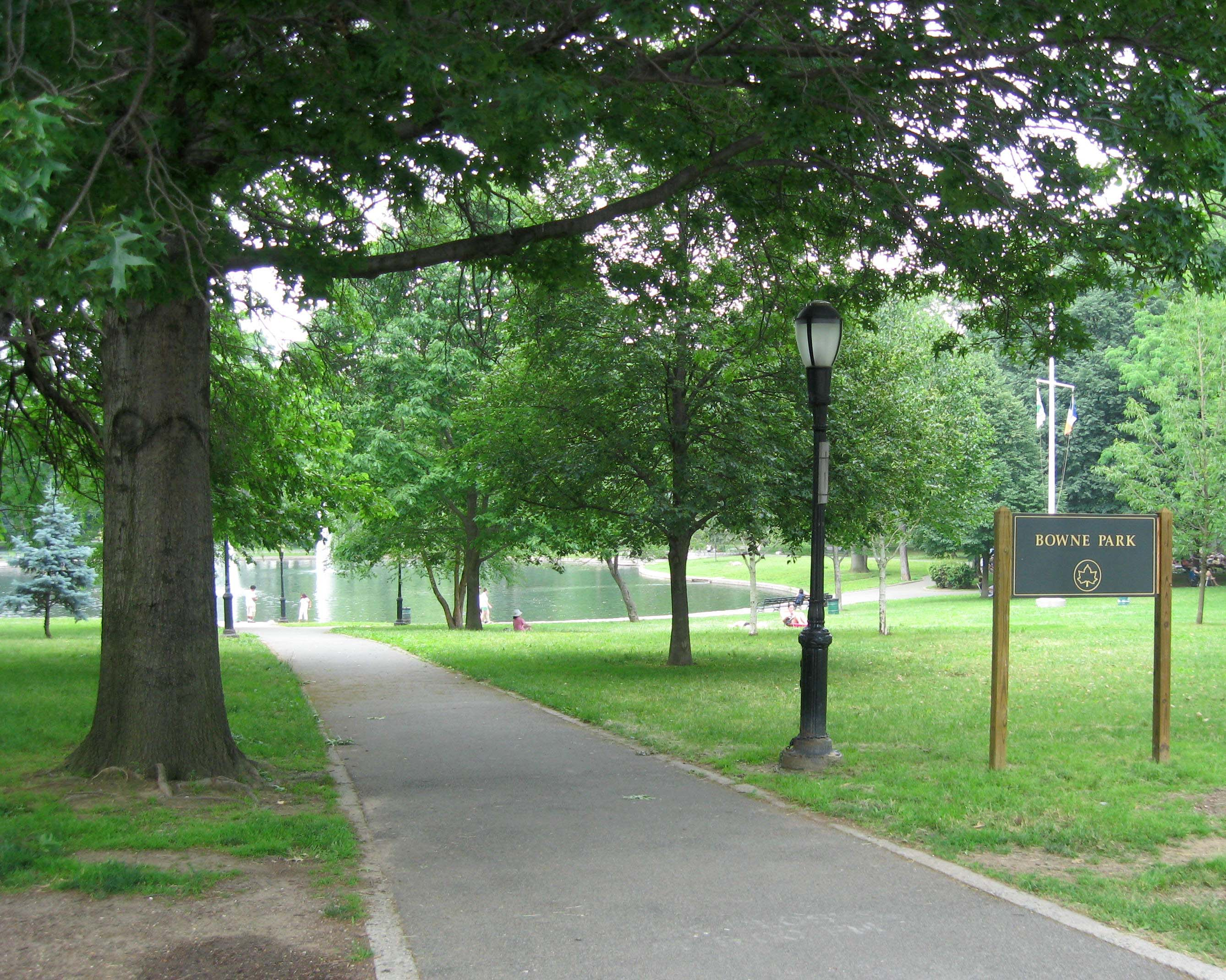
- Interactive map of Bowne Park
- Location: Broadway–Flushing, Queens, New York, US
- Coordinates: 40°46′14″N 73°48′26″W
- Area: 11.79 acres (4.77 ha)
- Created: 1925 or 1927
- Operator: New York City Department of Parks and Recreation
- Open: 6 a.m. to 1 a.m.
- Status: open
- Bowne Park
- U.S. Historic district – Contributing property
- Location: Bounded by 29th Ave., 159th St., 32nd Ave., and 155th St., Flushing, New York
- Coordinates: 40.770583°N 73.807327°W
- Built: 1925–1927
- Architectural style: Early and Mid-20th Century American Eclectic Period
- Part of: Broadway–Flushing Historic District (ID06000373)
- Added to NRHP: May 12, 2006

Bowne Park is a 11.79-acre (4.77 ha) park in Broadway–Flushing, Queens, New York, east of downtown Flushing. It is bordered by 29th Avenue on the north, 32nd Avenue on the south, 155th Street on the west, and 159th Street on the east. The park consists of a playground, basketball courts, bocce court, and a kettle pond. The area immediately surrounding the park, developed in the late 19th and early 20th centuries, was originally also marketed as "Bowne Park" and is part of modern-day Murray Hill and Broadway–Flushing.

Bowne Park was named for New York City mayor Walter Bowne, whose summer residence was located at the site until a fire destroyed it in March 1925. The land was bought by the city and designated as a park by 1927. Bowne Park contained the first modular playground in New York City, dedicated in 1969. The park was given a major renovation in 1994. It is operated by the New York City Department of Parks and Recreation.

== Description ==
Bowne Park is located on part of the Bowne Farm and covers 11.79 acres (4.77 ha). Its borders are 29th Avenue on the north, 32nd Avenue on the south, 155th Street on the west, and 159th Street on the east. The park is located in a subsection of Flushing and is variously considered to be in Broadway–Flushing; Murray Hill; North Flushing; or even Bayside, located to the east. The area immediately surrounding the park is primarily low-density residential: most homes in the region were built in the 20th century to one of several styles, including the Tudor, American colonial, or ranch styles. Bowne Park serves as a gathering place for residents of the surrounding area. The Bowne Park Civic Association, a neighborhood group founded in 1979, is active in advocacy for the park and nearby neighborhoods.

The western section of Bowne Park contains a kettle pond, an oval-shaped fresh water body covering 1 acre (0.40 ha) or 2 acres (0.81 ha). It is an aerated lagoon with three fountains. The shore is surrounded by a concrete retaining wall. On the southern shore is a flagpole whose design is similar to those found at marinas. The pond is fed by water from the New York City water supply system, though it was previously fed from a natural spring. Within the park are turtles and fish, as well as a cement carving of a turtle. There are two 50-foot-tall (15 m) weeping willows near the pond.

The central section of the park is mostly composed of old-growth forest, mainly oak trees dating to at least the late 19th or early 20th centuries. Bowne Park also contains American elms. Benches and lighting are located along the park's curving paths.

The eastern section contains an ovoid play area with a playground, bocce court, and basketball court. On the western side of the play area, NYC Parks maintains a Tudor-style park building that contains restrooms and storage closets. The building measures 26 by 72 feet (7.9 by 21.9 m) and has a gable roof, brick facade, and brick chimney. The park building also has space that is used as a children's nursery. A weather vane is located atop the roof.

== History ==
=== Site ===
Walter Bowne, mayor of New York City from 1829 to 1833, built his summer house on the site of the modern-day park in the early 19th century. The house had more than 15 rooms spread across two stories. By 1890, the neighborhood around the Walter Bowne house, specifically north of Broadway (now Northern Boulevard) and east of Murray Street, was being developed as a suburban area called "Bowne Park" or "Murray Hill Park". Initially, development was slow, with "less than a dozen houses" being built there in the next decade, despite claims that the Long Island Rail Road's nearby Broadway station would expedite trips to Manhattan. The Bowne Park neighborhood had been laid out in plots by 1906. However, the Bowne house and the adjacent Bowne Pond remained undeveloped, and the latter was a popular skating area during winters.

In 1906, the Hudson Realty Company bought the Walter Bowne house, as well as the associated 195-acre (79 ha) Bowne Farm. The areas to the north and south were developed in the subsequent years. The McKnight Realty Company announced the construction of 25 houses in the Bowne Park neighborhood in 1910, and George C. Meyer's Bowne Park Realty Company bought the remaining developed land around the house three years later. North of 33rd Avenue, the area was nominally owned by the Broadway-Flushing Company. That region remained underdeveloped because the William and Robert Bowne house was still occupied by the Bedells (or Beadles), who moved in 1923.

=== Park establishment ===
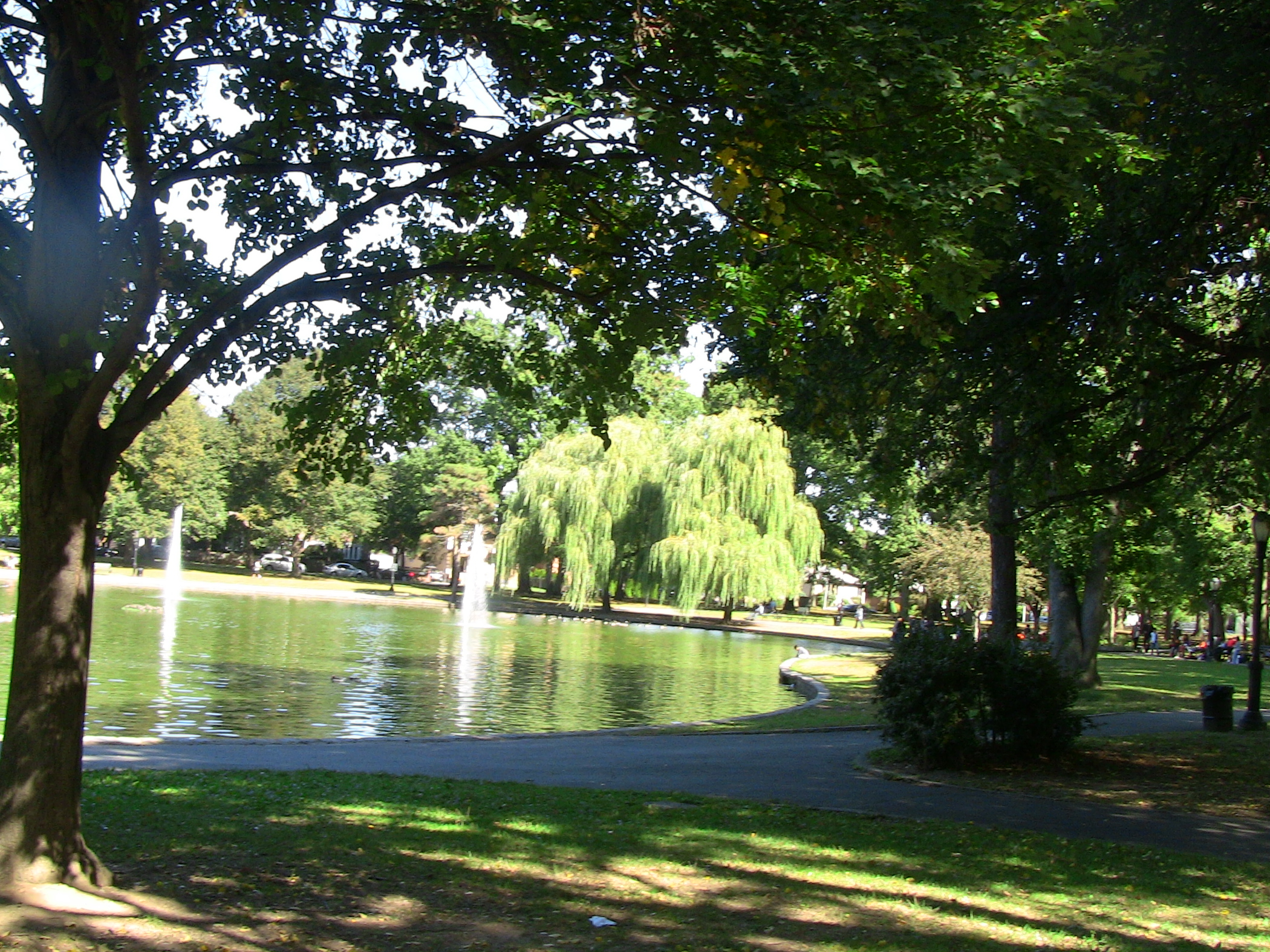
Overlooking the lake

On March 13, 1925, Walter Bowne's house burned down in a fire. There are conflicting dates about when the city acquired the land around the pond and the house site. The New York City Department of Parks and Recreation says that the land was condemned and acquired in June 1925. The National Park Service, in its report for the Broadway-Flushing Historic District, says that the land was bought by the city in 1927, though in real estate advertisements as early as 1923, the land was erroneously described as having been already purchased by the city.

The Works Progress Administration installed a paved path and a concrete shoreline on the pond during the Great Depression in the 1930s. Free plays were also hosted in the park during 1934 as part of the Actors Project, and the park building was built in 1935. During this era, Bowne Pond was designated as an official skating pond, and was a popular venue for boat races. One such race in 1937 drew 1,500 observers, such as parks commissioner Robert Moses as well as torpedo experts from the U.S. government. By the end of World War II, the stream entering Bowne Pond was infilled.

=== Later years ===
Funds for park renovations were proposed in the New York City governmental budget in the early 1960s but were then dropped. The first modular playground in New York City was opened within Bowne Park in June 1969 and included large fiberglass cubes. After a hurricane in 1968 felled over fifty trees in the park, several neighborhood groups approved a $500,000 renovation for Bowne Park in 1970. However, a restoration was not announced until 1973, when NYC Parks announced $430,000 in repairs, which included replacing the drainage system. At that time, the park was rundown: the pond was being used as a dump for various objects, including abandoned cars, while vandalism was rampant and much of the northern section was often flooded. During this restoration, some of Bowne Pond's fish were relocated to Flushing Meadows–Corona Park, while others ended up in the refrigerators of nearby homes; Mayor John Lindsay jokingly stated that, if residents wanted to eat the fish, "In view of what's happening to meat prices, we'll understand that." The renovation was completed by 1975.

In 1994, a $800,000 fund was provided by Queens borough president Claire Shulman for the renovation of the park. The project started in April 1994 and included renovating paths, draining and cleaning the pond, and adding, restoring, or replacing landscape features. In the following years, large algal blooms accumulated in Bowne Pond, so in 2002, the state gave a $250,000 grant toward cleaning the pond.

By the 2010s, residents were complaining about algal blooms and trash in the pond. Some of the more notable issues included a bloom of red algae in the pond in August 2012, a flood in the park pavilion in February 2014, and another flood in May 2014 after the pond's drainage stopped working. There were also fears of poaching, due to reports of missing fish and turtles. Furthermore, in August 2011, two 200-year-old trees in Bowne Park were knocked down during Hurricane Irene. Borough officials announced in mid-2014 that they had allotted $2.45 million for renovation of the park's playground and cleanup of the pond. Work on the playground and basketball court was started in October 2016 as part of a $1.5 million project, and was completed the following August.

A renovation of Bowne Park began in March 2021. The work involved constructing a pipe from a groundwater well to the pond, dredging the pond, replacing granite around the pond's edge, repaving paths, and adding plants. The project was finished in May 2023 at a cost of $3.6 million.
