= Broadway station (LIRR) =

Long Island Rail Road station in Queens, New York

Broadway
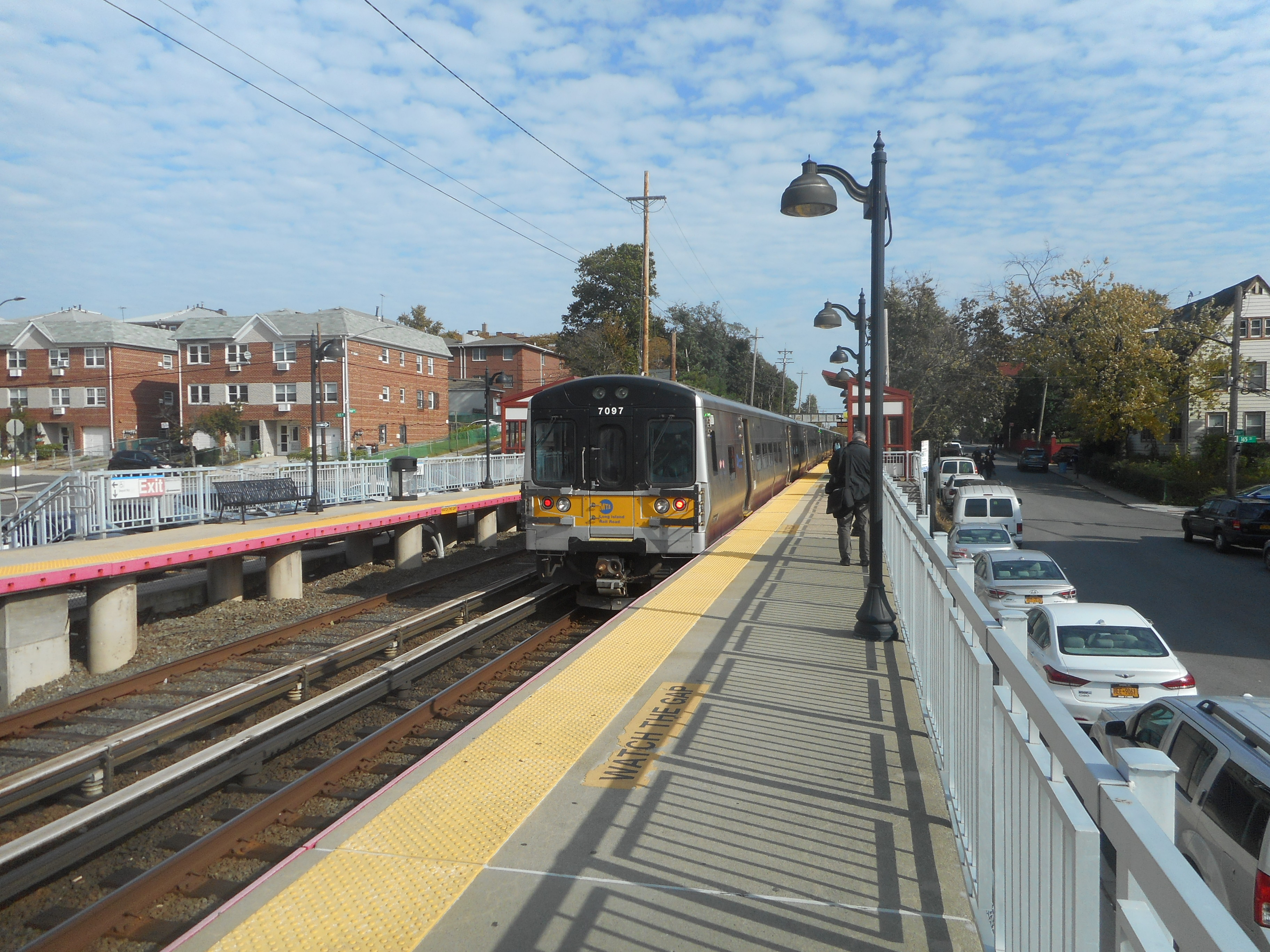
- An eastbound train departing Broadway, looking east

General information
- Location: 162nd Street and Northern Boulevard; Murray Hill, Queens, New York
- Coordinates: 40.761626°N 73.801383°W
- Owner: Long Island Rail Road
- Line: Port Washington Branch
- Distance: 9.2 mi (14.8 km) from Long Island City
- Platforms: 2 side platforms
- Tracks: 2
- Connections: NYCT Bus: Q12, Q13; MTA Bus: Q28, Q65; Nassau Inter-County Express: n20G, n20X

Construction
- Platform levels: 3
- Parking: Yes (parking meter)
- Accessible: Yes

Other information
- Station code: BDY
- Fare zone: 3

History
- Opened: October 27, 1866 (NY&F)
- Rebuilt: 1906, 1913, 2003, 2007
- Electrified: October 21, 1913; 750 V (DC) third rail
- Former names: East Flushing (1866–1872)

Passengers
- 2012—2014: 2,400
- Rank: 46 of 125

Services
Preceding station	Long Island Rail Road	Following station
Murray Hill toward Penn Station or Grand Central	Port Washington Branch	Auburndale toward Port Washington
Location

Broadway is a station on the Port Washington Branch of the Long Island Rail Road, located in the East Flushing and Broadway neighborhoods of Queens, New York City. The station is just east of a railroad overpass at the intersection of 162nd Street and Northern Boulevard.

== History ==
The Broadway station opened on October 27, 1866 as East Flushing and was built by the New York and Flushing Railroad. The station continued to use the East Flushing name until May 1872, when it was renamed Broadway for the adjacent neighborhood as well as a section of Northern Boulevard known then by that name.

=== 20th century ===
The present elevated station was built in 1913, when the Port Washington Branch was rebuilt through this area during a grade crossing elimination project through Broadway–Flushing, Murray Hill, and Flushing. As part of this project, which was executed by the New York Public Service Commission, new high-level platforms were constructed in addition to the current station house. The tracks were also raised onto an embankment at the west end of the station, thereby eliminating the grade crossings at Broadway and 162nd Street by allowing the tracks to pass over the road – and its east end was depressed, allowing the line to continue east in an open cut and for roads to cross above it. The platforms at the station were designed in similar fashion to those at the Hollis station on the Main Line, rebuilt about the same time as part of a grade crossing elimination project along that line, east of Jamaica.

By the 1930s, the name of the street section had changed from Broadway to Northern Boulevard, so as to avoid confusion with another Broadway located in western Queens – but the names of both the station and the neighborhood remained the same.

=== 21st century ===
In 2003, Broadway's station house was rehabilitated and restored to its original, 1913 design. Upgrades such as improved lighting, new public address systems, and additional landscaping were also installed through the project.

Between 2007 and 2008, the Broadway staton underwent another modernization project, through which the platforms and other components of the station's infrastructure were extensively rehabilitated and modernized. Lighting, shelters, railings, and public address systems were replaced, and new canopies were added. Additionally, ramps were installed linking the platforms, the street, and the station's tunnel beneath the tracks, bringing the station into compliance with the Americans with Disabilities Act (ADA) standards and thus making it wheelchair accessible.

== Station layout ==
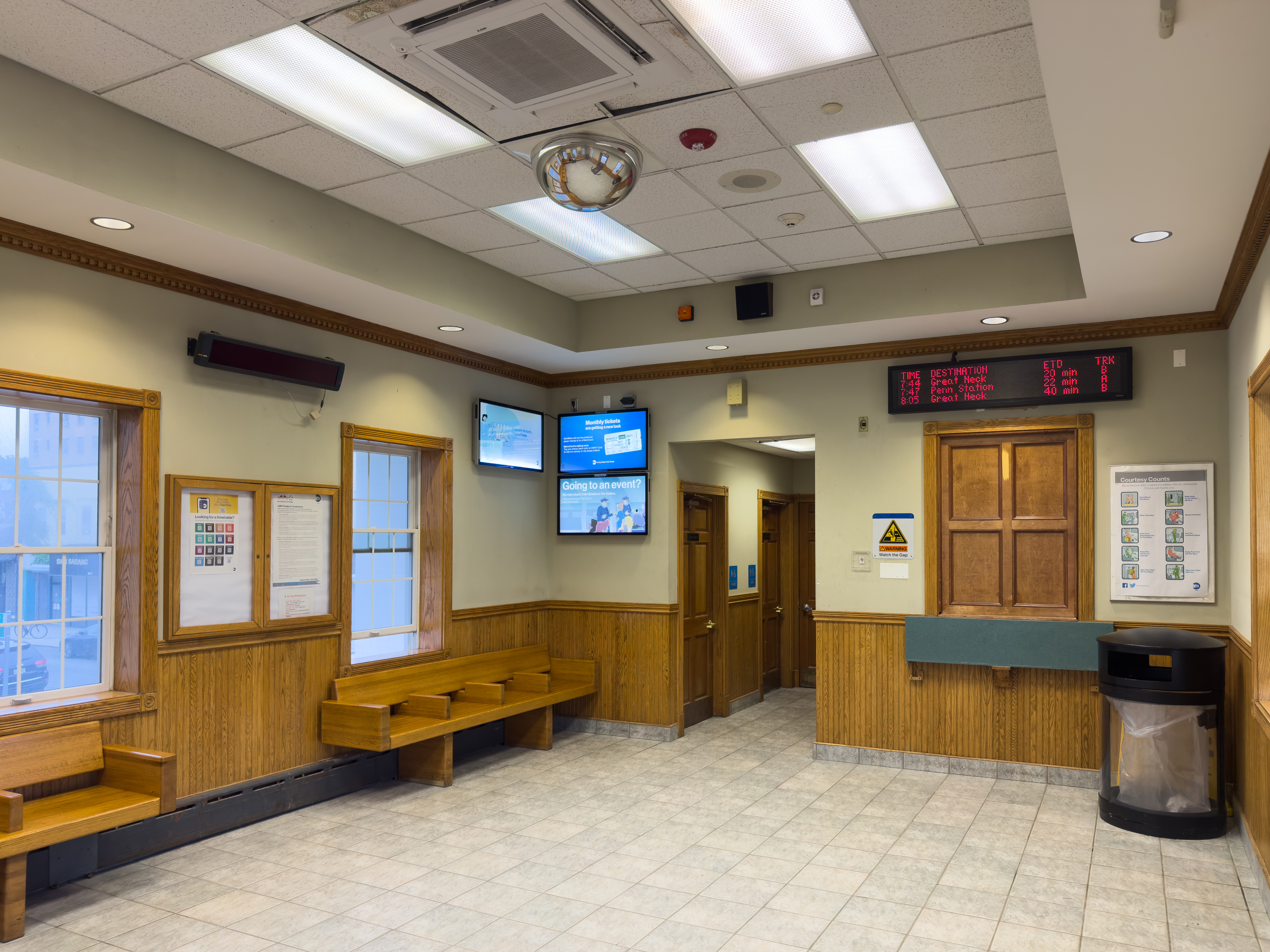
The station house of the Broadway station.

The station has two high-level elevated side platforms, each ten cars long. There is a pedestrian underpass by the station building at 164th Street, in addition to an overpass at 167th Street, just east of the station. Additionally, there is an underpass for Northern Boulevard that contains a sidewalk. The station house contains a waiting room, an LED display, and restrooms. The building's hours are weekdays between 5:00 AM and 2:00 PM. Ticket machines are located on the outside of the station house on platform A and are Full Service and Daily versions. Free parking is available on the side of platform A on both sides of the station house; there are 2 accessible spots and reserved spots for ticket purchasing.

On the platform, LED lights and displays are present with a Public Address (PA) system. Tactile platform edge strips are also present which meet the Americans with Disabilities Act (ADA). There are also waiting shelters with seating and heating as well as benches. Trash cans are present throughout the station and Safety signs in addition to station name signs. There are also "Mind The Gap" warnings painted on the platform that mark approximately where the door stops when the train is stopped.

== See also ==
- List of Long Island Rail Road stations
- Hollis station
