= John Bowne House =

Historic house in Queens, New York

- U.S. National Register of Historic Places
- New York State Register of Historic Places
- New York City Landmark
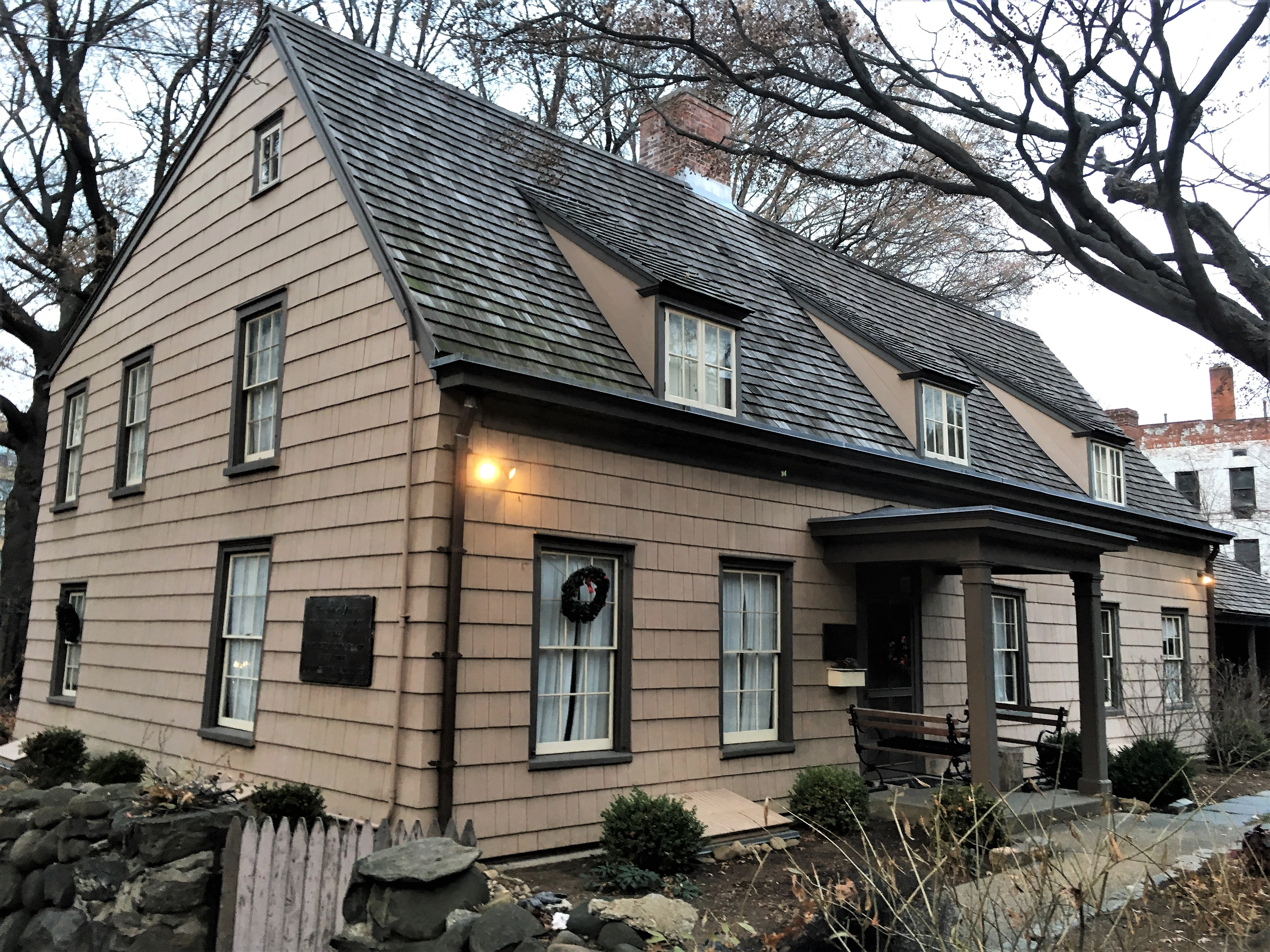
- John Bowne House in 2018

- Location within New York City
- Location: 37-01 Bowne Street, Flushing, New York, U.S.
- Coordinates: 40.762894°N 73.824948°W
- Area: 9 acres (3.6 ha)
- Built: c. 1661
- Architectural style: Anglo-Dutch Colonial
- NRHP reference No.: 77000974
- NYSRHP No.: 08101.000010
- NYCL No.: 0143

Significant dates
- Added to NRHP: September 13, 1977
- Designated NYSRHP: June 23, 1980
- Designated NYCL: February 15, 1966

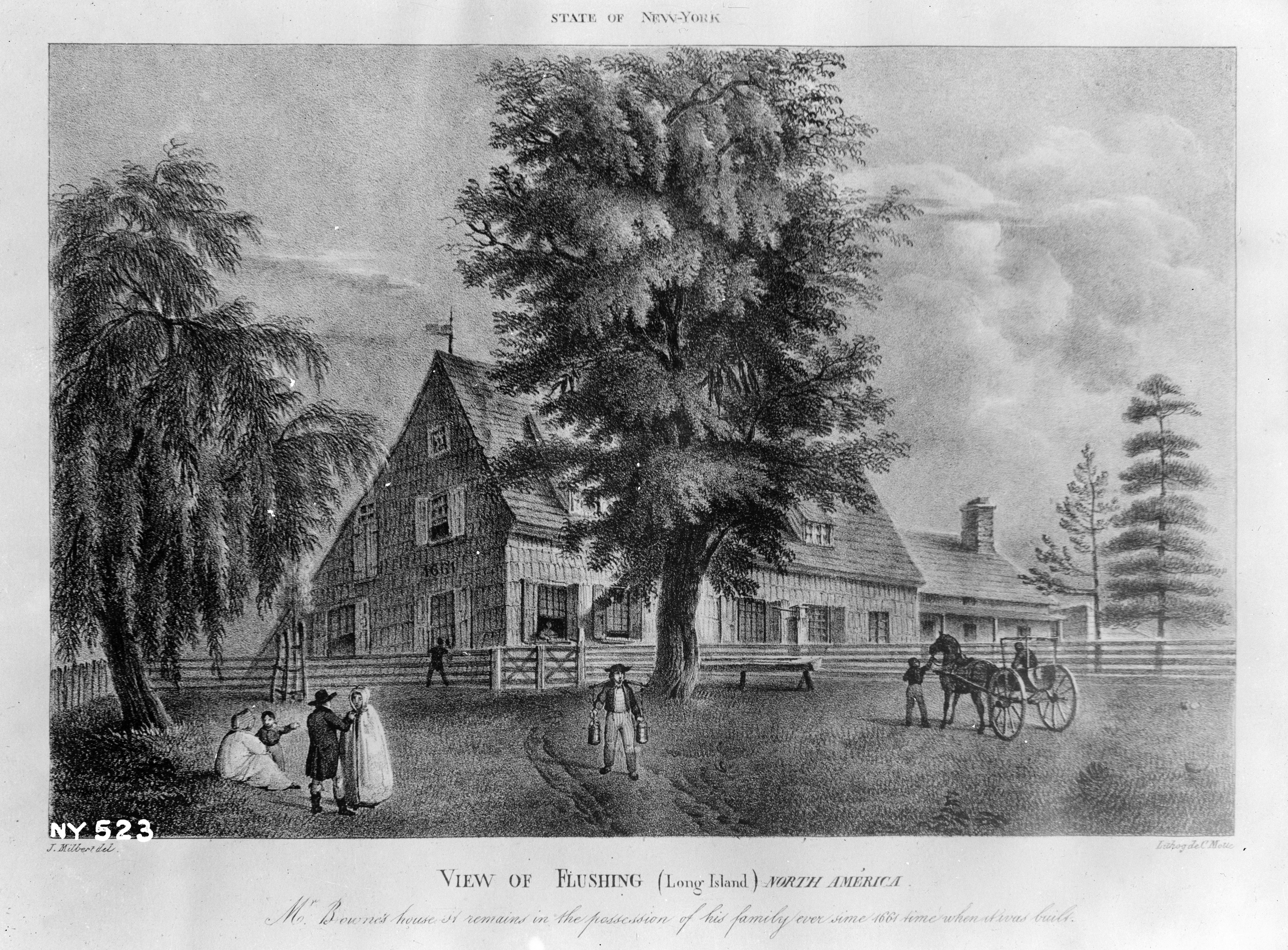
View of Flushing, John Bowne House, 1825

The John Bowne House is a house at 37-01 Bowne Street in Flushing, Queens, New York City, that is known for its role in establishing religious tolerance in the United States.

Built around 1661, it was the location of a Quaker meeting in 1662 that resulted in the arrest of its owner, John Bowne, by Peter Stuyvesant, Dutch Director-General of New Netherland. Bowne successfully appealed his arrest to the Dutch West India Company and established a precedent for religious tolerance and freedom in the colony. His appeal helped to serve as the basis for the later guarantees of freedom of religion, speech and right of assembly in the Constitution.

Many of John Bowne's descendants engaged in abolitionist anti-slavery activism. For example, John's great-grandson Robert Bowne was an early founder with Alexander Hamilton and others of the Manumission Society of New York in 1784. Some of its residents such as Mary Bowne Parsons' son William B. Parsons have also been documented as acting as conductors assisting fugitive slaves on the Underground Railroad prior to the American Civil War.

The home is a wood-frame Anglo-Dutch Colonial saltbox, notable for its steeply pitched roof with three dormers. The house was altered several times over the centuries, and several generations of the Bowne family lived in the house until 1945, when the family deeded the property to the Bowne Historical Society. The Bowne House became a museum in 1947. The exterior has since been renovated. Archaeological investigations have been conducted by Dr. James A. Moore of Queens College, City University of New York.

The building was listed on the National Register of Historic Places in 1977, and is also a New York City designated landmark.

== See also ==
- List of the oldest buildings in New York
- Flushing Remonstrance
- List of New York City Designated Landmarks in Queens
- National Register of Historic Places listings in Queens
