= Wilhelmena Rhodes Kelly =

American genealogist

New York State Regent, Daughters of the American Revolution
- In office June 2019 – October 16, 2019

Personal details
- Born: Wilhelmena Rhodes; December 11, 1946 Brooklyn, New York City
- Died: October 16, 2019 (aged 72)
- Education: Brooklyn College
- Occupation: Genealogist
- Known for: African-American genealogy

Wilhelmena Rhodes Kelly (née Rhodes December 11, 1946 – October 16, 2019) was an African-American genealogist who traced her American lineage to the April 5, 1614, union of Pocahontas and John Rolfe. She was also a member of the Jamestowne Society. In 2019 she became the New York State Regent and a member of the National Board of Management, making her the highest-ranking woman of color in the National Society Daughters of the American Revolution (NSDAR) since its founding in 1890. She was a pioneer of African-American genealogy. Born and raised in Brooklyn, she was a local Brooklyn historian and member of the Society of Old Brooklynites (SOB), one of the borough's oldest civic organizations. She was the author of books on Bedford-Stuyvesant as well as the Crown Heights and Weeksville sections of Brooklyn, and family genealogy books tracing her family's American roots.

== Early life and education ==
Kelly was born in Brooklyn, on December 11, 1946, to George Morrell Rhodes, Jr. (born 1921) and Dorothy Hamlin Rhodes (born 1924). She was the second of two children joining her older sister, Linda Marie (born 1944). The surname Kelly, acquired through an early unsuccessful marriage, was retained throughout her life.

As a child, she was nicknamed "Mena". She attended Brooklyn neighborhood public schools; Lefferts Junior High School, Erasmus Hall High School. She graduated with a degree in English from Brooklyn College in 1970.

Kelly was the third generation of her family to live in Brooklyn. Her grandparents had bought a brownstone in Bedford-Stuyvesant in 1932, and she was raised there until the age of thirteen when the family moved to Union Street in the Crown Heights section of the borough. The Brooklyn Historical Society interviewed her about her childhood experiences for their Crown Heights Oral History Project. Based upon her personal and historical knowledge of these Brooklyn areas, she later wrote about Bedford-Stuyvesant and Crown Heights, two historically Black sections of Brooklyn. These books contain both personal and archival photographs of the borough.

An avid reader, she was especially drawn to books on history. At home, this manifested itself in her questions to her paternal grandparents about what it was like growing up in the 1890s American South, then making the move in 1930 to New York City during the Great Migration, a time period from 1916 to 1970 during which approximately 6 million African Americans migrated to urban Northeast location from the Southern United States. These tales also led to her life-long interest in Brooklyn history and the African American community.

She was fascinated by the genealogy work of her mother and uncle, John “Dukie” Hamlin on the Hamlin family of Virginia, who hired a professional genealogist in the 1970s to trace the family history. She later traced her interest in genealogy to these incidents.

Her father, George Rhodes, was a resident of Bedford-Stuyvesant whom graduated from Boys High School and Brooklyn Polytechnic Institute. He qualified for the special Army Air Force Program at Tuskegee Institute. Lt. Rhodes won distinction as a member of the Tuskegee Airmen. His military exploits in an air battle in Europe were celebrated on the front page of the Amsterdam News on August 26, 1944.

== Lineage organizations ==
=== Jamestowne Society ===
Kelly became a member of the Jamestowne Society in 2007, tracing her American lineage to Pocahontas and John Rolfe. The Jamestowne Society is an educational, historical, and patriotic organization dedicated to discovering and recording the names of those early settlers, recording their deeds, and promoting the restoration of historical records and artifacts. She served the New York Company as its Governor for one term from early 2017 until March 30, 2019. In July 2019, she attended the 400th Anniversary of the First Meeting of the General Assembly speaking in recognition of the "20 and odd" Africans brought to Virginia in 1619. Her remarks were published in full in the Fall 2019 issue of the Jamestowne Society Magazine, Volume 43, number 2.

=== National Society Daughters of the American Revolution ===
Kelly traced the family on her mother's side to Revolutionary War patriot Stephen Henry Hamlin of Prince George County. As a Quaker and farmer, Stephen H. Hamlin did not actively participate in battles. He is documented as providing critical goods in supports of the American Revolution. These included: 1 horse (age 6 years), 3 "beeves" (750 pounds of beef), 3 sheep, 135 bushels of corn, 600 pounds of fodder, and an additional 590 bushels of corn. This aid delivered to the fight for freedom qualified the family to file for membership in the National Society Daughters of the American Revolution (NSDAR).

Kelly joined the Manhattan Chapter of the DAR in July 2004, eventually becoming Chapter Regent. In July 2012, she was the Organizing Regent for the Increase Carpenter Chapter of DAR, located in Jamaica, Queens, New York. In that capacity, she often served as a link between the Borough of Queens and its colonial history. That first year, she was a guest at the Kingsland Homestead in Flushing, Queens, site of the Weeping Beech, the mother of all European weeping beeches in the United States. Here, she presented a Newtown Pippen apple tree to the Queens Historical Society on behalf of the chapter. The tree was deemed the official apple of New York City in 2009 by a New York City Council resolution.

Within DAR, she served as National Chairman of Public Relations and Media, National Vice Chairman of the Commemorative Events Committee, during which she designed a tri-color flag in recognition of the tenth anniversary of the September 11 attacks in 2011. She was often referred to as "a walking goodwill ambassador" for the DAR in recognition of her constant speaking engagements, teaching at genealogy workshops and willingness to help others construct their family histories. Her efforts are unofficially thought to have led 100 women to successfully complete paperwork required to join the NSDAR. She became the highest ranking woman of color in the history of the DAR, founded in 1890, and a member of the National Board of Management. She was installed as New York State Regent in June 2019.

== Professional genealogical researcher ==
Kelly helped over one hundred women with genealogical research, identifying their descent from an American patriot who fought or rendered service in the Revolution, and qualifying them as members of the NSDAR. She was a member of the Association of Professional Genealogists-New York Company (APG-NY.) She helped found the Macon Library Branch of the African-Atlantic Genealogical Society (AAGS), and worked with the Weeksville Heritage Society and the Afro-American Historical and Genealogical Society (AAHGS).

== Death ==
Kelly was diagnosed with kidney cancer in the summer of 2019. She died on October 16, 2019. She was buried in Pinelawn Memorial Park in Farmingdale, New York.

== Publications ==
- Kelly, Wilhelmena Rhodes (November 22, 2004). The Hines Bush Family: And other related people of color from Barnwell District, Carolina 1842–2004. Hats Off Books. ISBN 978-1587363900.
- Kelly, Wilhelmena Rhodes (August 22, 2007). Bedford-Stuyvesant (Images of America: New York). Arcadia Publishing. ISBN 9780738550046.
- Kelly, Wilhelmena Rhodes (August 31, 2009). Crown Heights and Weeksville. Arcadia Publishing. ISBN 978-0738565989.
- Kelly, Wilhelmena Rhodes (2009). The long and winding road to Jamestowne, Virginia 1607. Xlibris Corporation LLC. ISBN 9781465365439.

== See also ==
- Daniel D. Whitney
- Marjorie Parker Smith
- John W. Hunter
