= Margaret I. Carman =

American teacher and historian

Margaret Isabel Carman (July 12, 1890 – January 30, 1976) was an American teacher and historian, best known for her contributions to the preservation and dissemination of the history of Flushing, New York. Born into a prominent family with a rich history, Carman spent her entire career teaching at Flushing High School, the oldest public secondary school in New York City, where she inspired generations of students to take an interest in history and become active citizens.

== Biography ==
Carman's father, Ringgold W. Carman, was a Union Army veteran and a descendant of Captain Henry "Light-horse Harry" Lee, a hero of the Revolutionary War, and a relative of the legendary Confederate General Robert E. Lee. Ringold Carman served in the Union Army during the Civil War and fought in some of the bloodiest battles of the conflict, including Antietam. His experiences on the battlefield left a lasting impression on him, and he was known to speak openly about the horrors of war. Upon hearing of the D-Day invasion during World War II, he reportedly remarked to his daughter that he had seen 24,000 dead on the field at Antietam and that this would be even worse. In the days that followed, Carman reportedly "slumped into a stupor from which he did not rally." He died on June 16, 1944, at the age of 96. He was the last remaining Civil War Veteran in Queens.

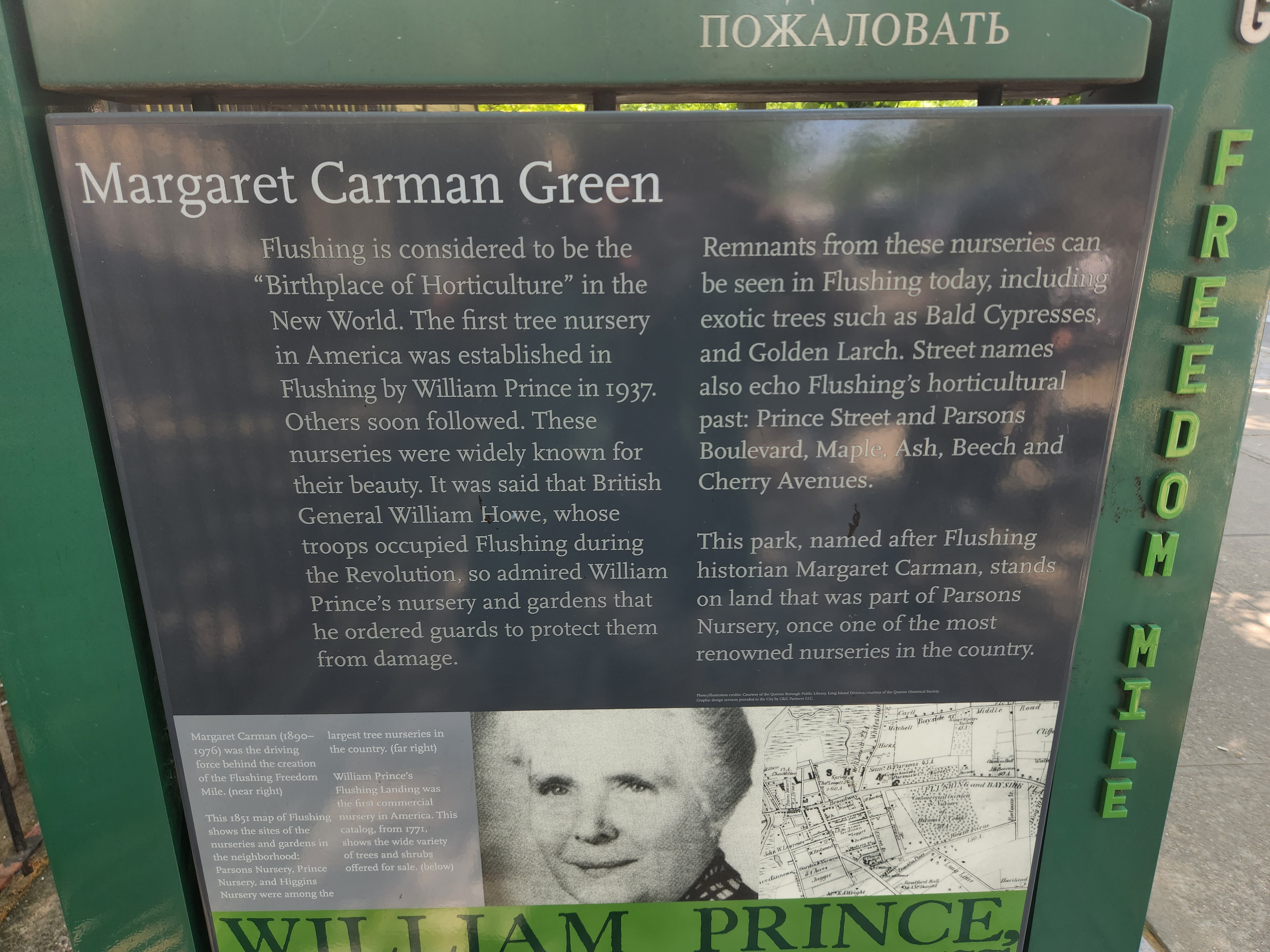
Margaret Carman Green Flushing Freedom Mile

Carman herself was a graduate of St. Joseph's Academy for Young Ladies, Flushing High School, and Barnard College, where she developed a deep appreciation for the study of history.

Carman's passion for history was evident in her teaching at Flushing High School, where she taught for 44 years before retiring in 1960. Her classes were renowned for their rigor and depth, and she encouraged her students to think critically and engage with history as a living, evolving discipline. Many of her former students went on to become successful historians, teachers, and civic leaders in their own right.

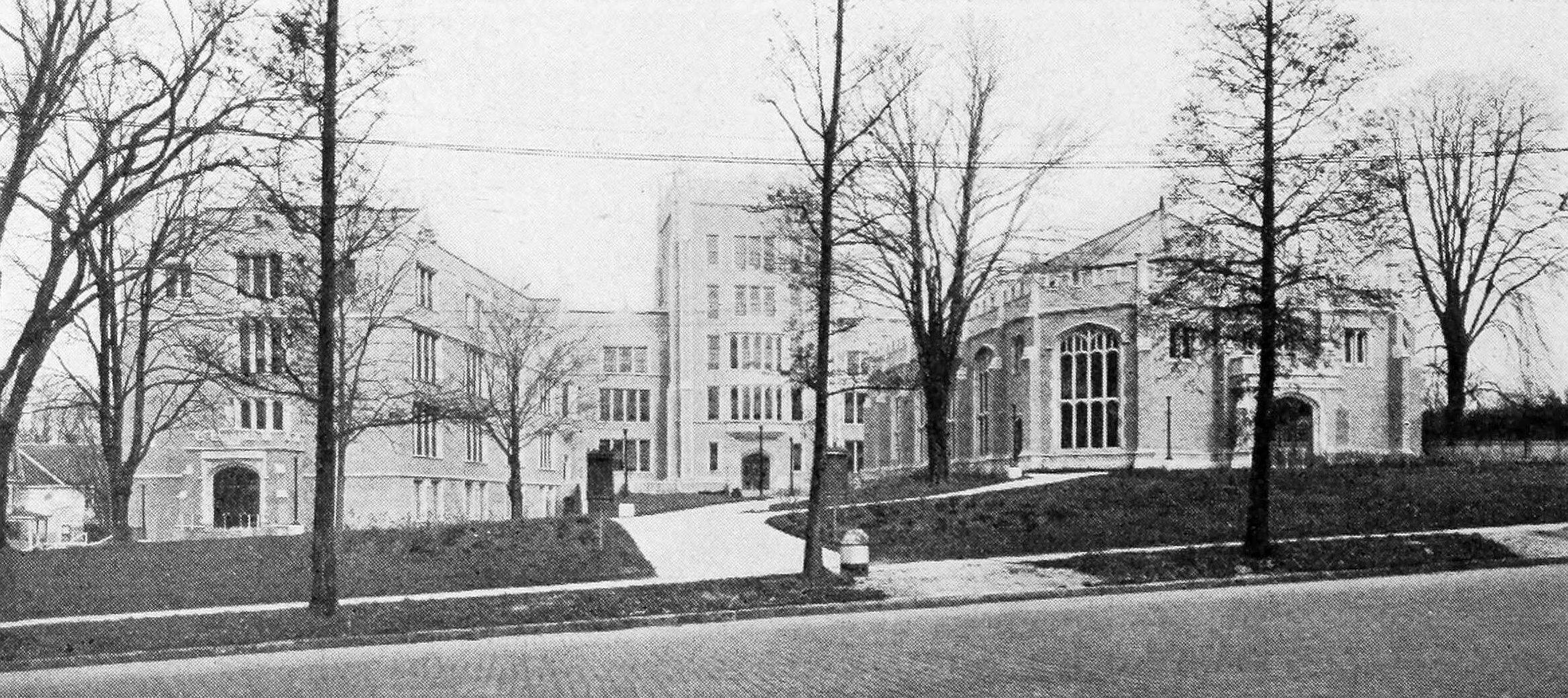
Flushing High School, New York City (1917)

After retiring from teaching, Carman devoted herself to preserving and promoting the history of Flushing, a community with a rich and diverse history dating back to colonial times. She was a lifelong member of the Daughters of the American Revolution and played an active role in the organization's efforts to preserve historic landmarks and promote the study of American history.

== Historian ==
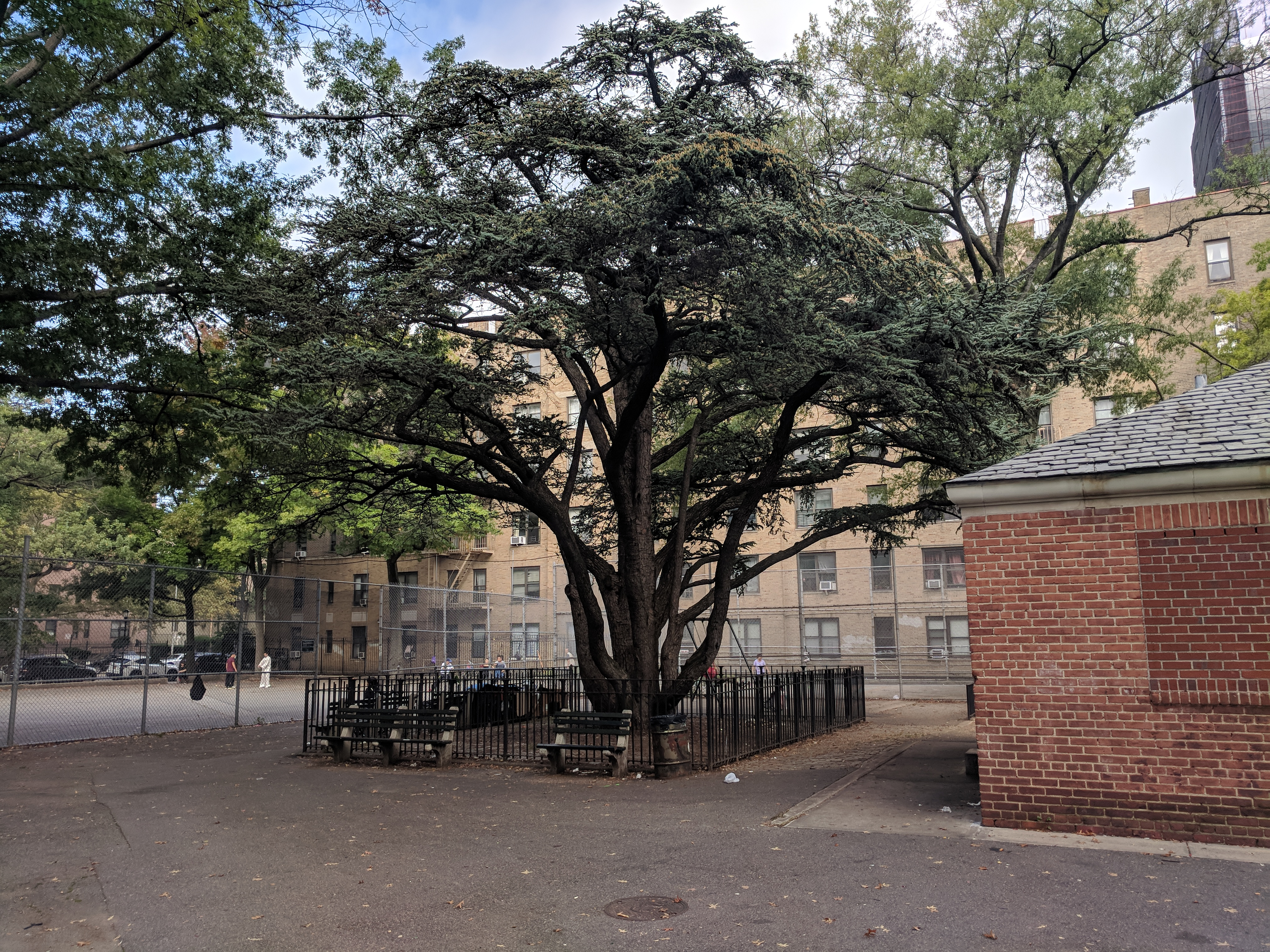
Cedar of Lebanon at Carman Green

Carman's contributions to the preservation of Flushing's history were numerous and wide-ranging. She helped to establish the Bowne House Historical Society, which oversaw the preservation and restoration of the historic John Bowne House, a landmark of religious freedom in America. She was also instrumental in the establishment of the Queens Historical Society and the Flushing Historical Society, both of which continue to play an active role in preserving and promoting the history of the region.

In addition to her leadership role at the Bowne House Historical Society, Margaret Carman was instrumental in the establishment of the Flushing Freedom Trail, a 1.3-mile trail that highlights important historical sites in Flushing, many of which are associated with the Underground Railroad. The trail begins at the John Bowne House, which is widely regarded as a symbol of religious freedom, and includes stops at the Kingsland Homestead, the Friends Quaker Meeting House, and other notable landmarks in the area.

== Legacy ==
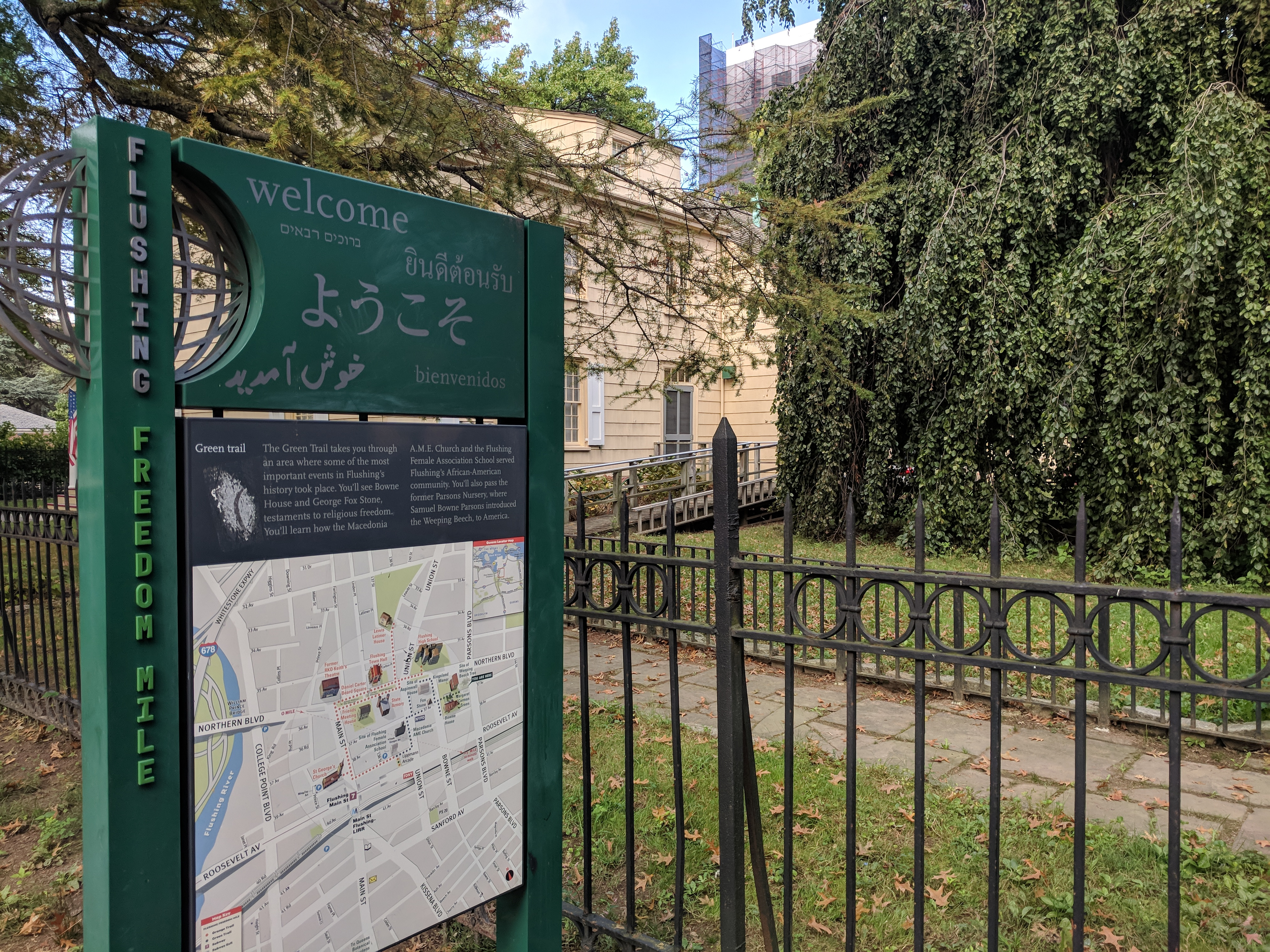
Flushing freedom Mile 20181010 102629

Carman's efforts to preserve and promote Flushing's history have had a lasting impact on the community. In recognition of her contributions, members of the Flushing community named a tree-lined square in Weeping Beech Park after her in 1976, just months after her death. The square, which is surrounded by willow oaks, serves as a reminder of Carman's dedication to Flushing's rich heritage and her tireless efforts to ensure that it would be remembered and celebrated for generations to come.

In March 1999 after Parks Commissioner Stern delivered a eulogy for the Weeping Beech it was decided that a 10-foot (3.0 m) section of the dead tree would remain in the park as a memorial. By then, the weeping Beech's progeny had been spread all over the United States. The rest of the tree would be given to artists to use for sculptures and benches along a heritage trail in downtown Flushing.

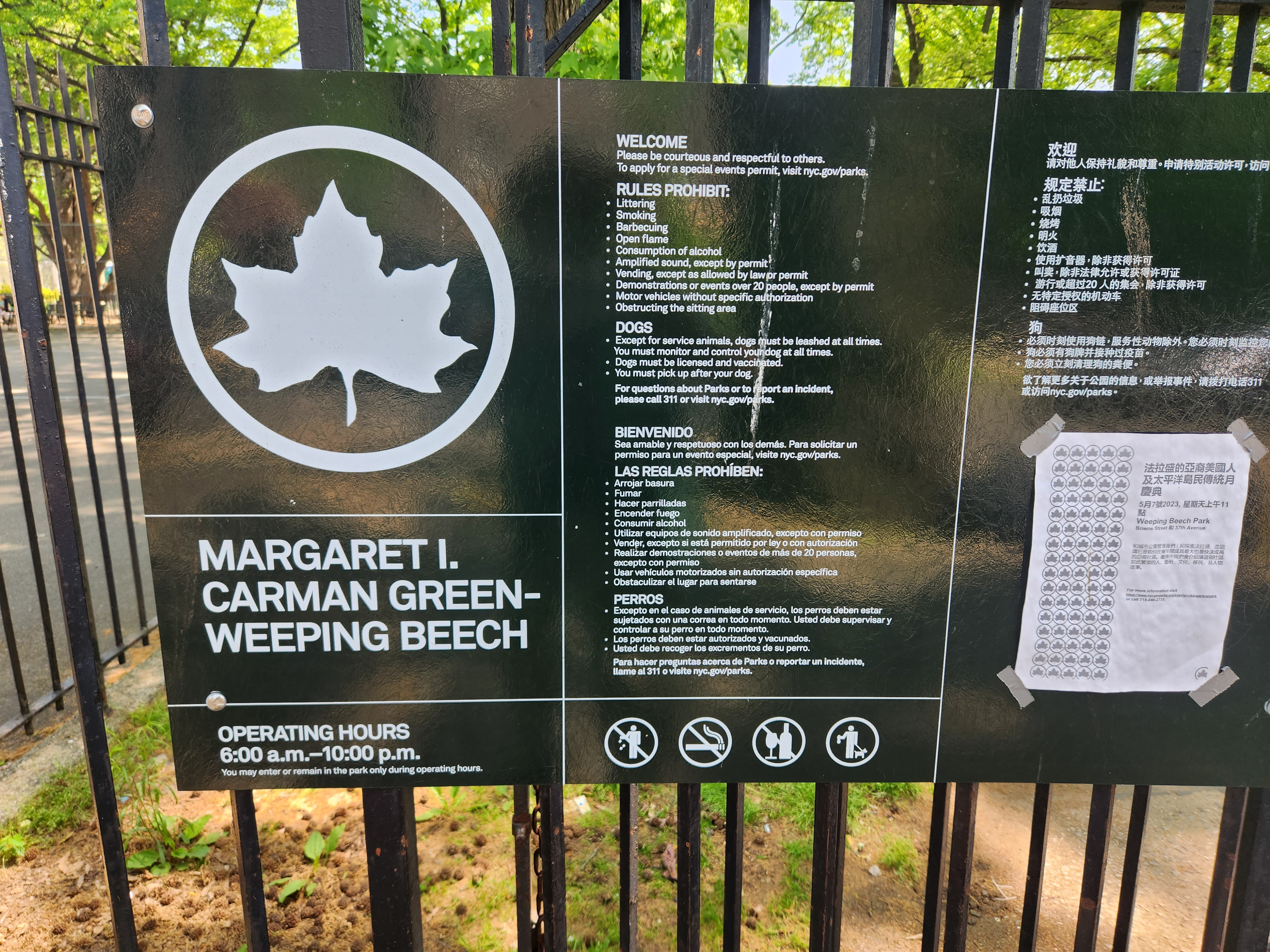
Margaret Carman Green, NYC Parks Dept
