= Weeping Beech (Queens) =

- U.S. National Register of Historic Places
- New York State Register of Historic Places
- New York City Landmark
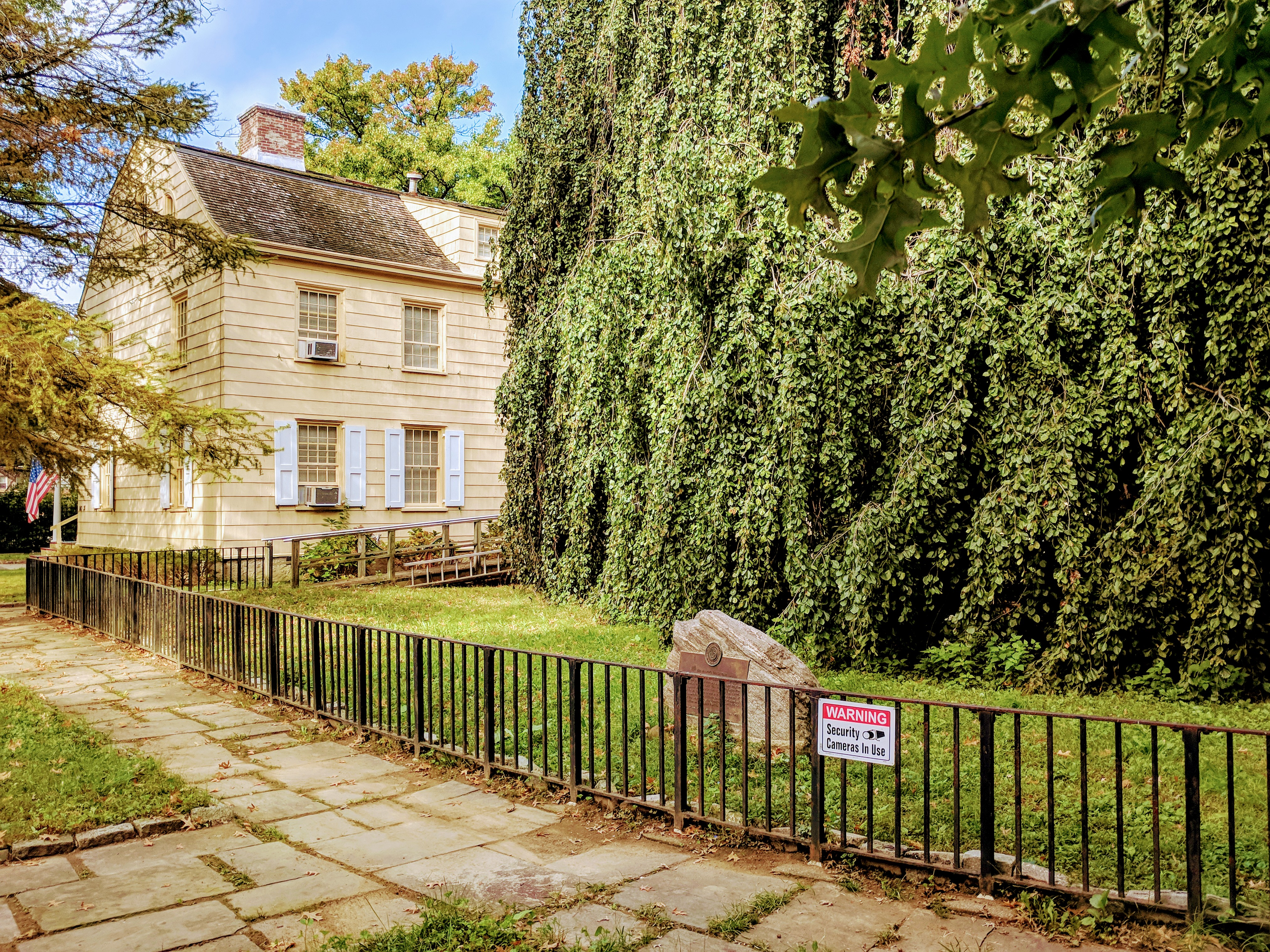
- Kingsland Homestead and the site of the Weeping Beech
- Location: 37th Av. and Parsons Blvd., Flushing, New York
- Coordinates: 40°45′49″N 73°49′27″W
- Area: less than one acre
- Built: 1847
- NRHP reference No.: 72000905
- NYSRHP No.: 08101.000020
- NYCL No.: 0142

Significant dates
- Added to NRHP: May 31, 1972
- Designated NYSRHP: July 1, 1983
- Designated NYCL: April 19, 1966

The Weeping Beech was a historic tree located at Weeping Beech Park in Flushing, Queens, New York City. It was the mother of all European weeping beeches in the United States. The Weeping Beech was imported by horticulturalist Samuel Parsons Sr. in 1846 and planted in 1847. It was designated a living New York City Landmark in 1966, one of two trees in New York City to have received that designation, and was placed on the National Register of Historic Places in 1972 along with the adjacent Kingsland Homestead. The Weeping Beech was partially removed in 1998.

The region around the Weeping Beech, called Weeping Beech Park, contains a playground, the Kingsland Homestead, the John Bowne House, and several other historically significant trees.

== History and description ==
Samuel Bowne Parsons Sr., father of Samuel Parsons purchased the cutting that produced the Weeping Beech while travelling in Belgium in 1846. The tree was on the estate of Baron DeMann in Beersal, Belgium, and transplanted to Flushing in 1847. Parsons also created a nursery in Queens in 1868. The nursery was later transported to Kissena Park, where it became a keystone of Flushing's horticultural industry until its closing in 1901.

In 1966, the Weeping Beech was designated an official New York City landmark. At the time, the tree had grown to a spread of 85 feet (26 m) and a height of 65 feet (20 m). The girth of the trunk was 14 feet (4.3 m). The Weeping Beech was one of two trees in New York City that were designated as city landmarks, the other being the Magnolia grandiflora in Bedford–Stuyvesant, Brooklyn.

== Weeping Beech Park ==
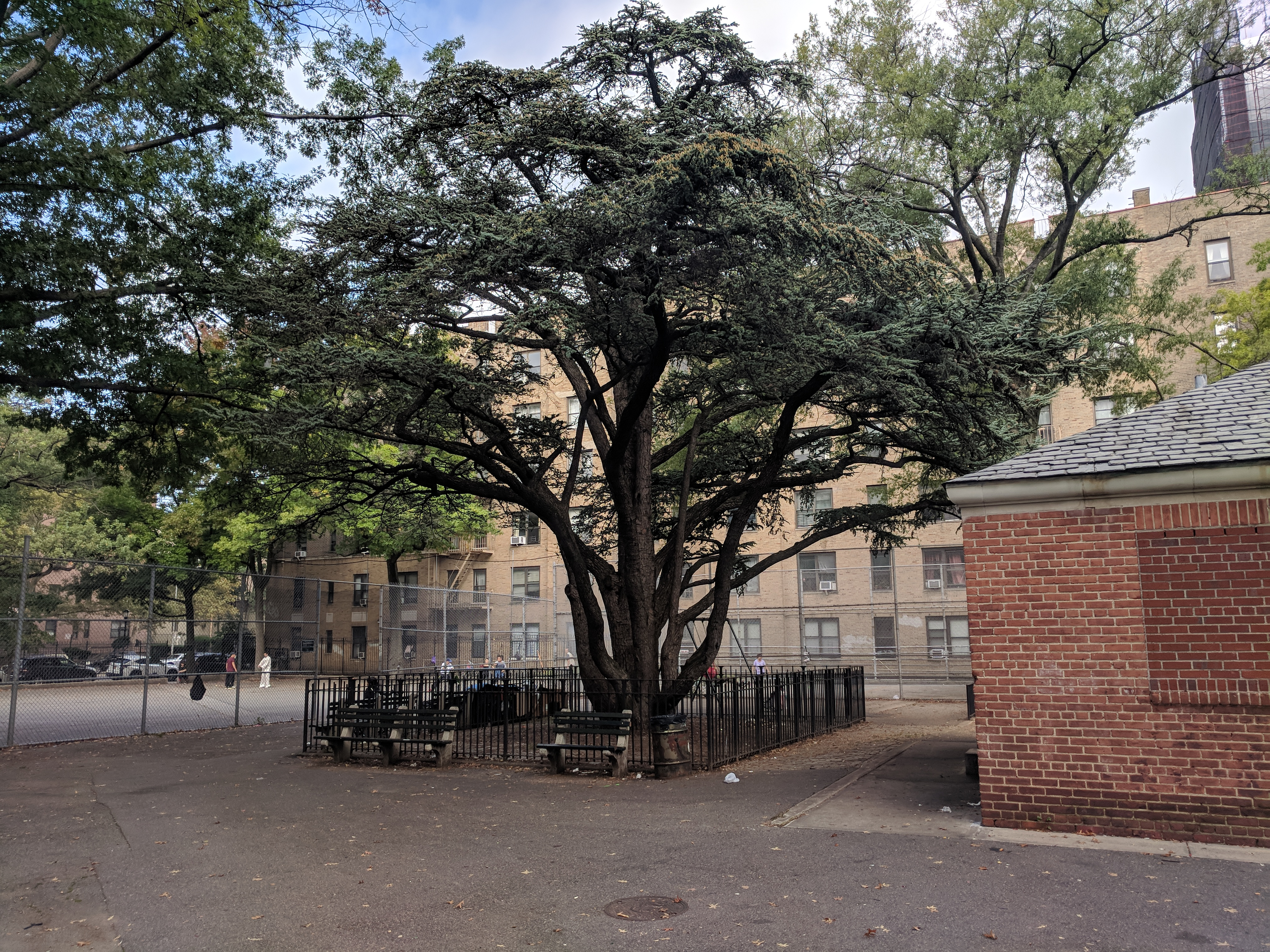
Cedar of Lebanon

The adjacent Weeping Beech Park was created in 1945 in order to protect the John Bowne House, which was designated a museum in 1947. Home to generations of the Bowne family until 1945, the Bowne House reportedly served as a stop on the Underground Railroad prior to the American Civil War. It is listed on the National Register of Historic Places and is also a New York City landmark.

The park also contains the Kingsland Homestead, a house named for sea captain Joseph King. Due to encroaching development from the proposed extension of the New York City Subway's Flushing Line in 1923, the house was moved twice, the second time to Weeping Beech Park. The Homestead is listed on the National Register of Historic Places and is also separately a New York City landmark. It was officially dedicated as a museum in March 1973 and is also home to the Queens Historical Society.

The park includes a 1.3-acre (0.53 ha) playground, rebuilt in 1956. The park also contains a grove of weeping beech trees, descendants of the original Weeping Beech planted in 1847. The grove is next to a rare Golden Larch that is on the sidewalk of 37th Avenue and a large Cedar of Lebanon is in the playground. Abutting the park are a 49-inch (1,200 mm) diameter Northern Red Oak and a 50-inch (1,300 mm) diameter White Oak, both of which top 80 feet (24 m).

== Destruction and memorial ==
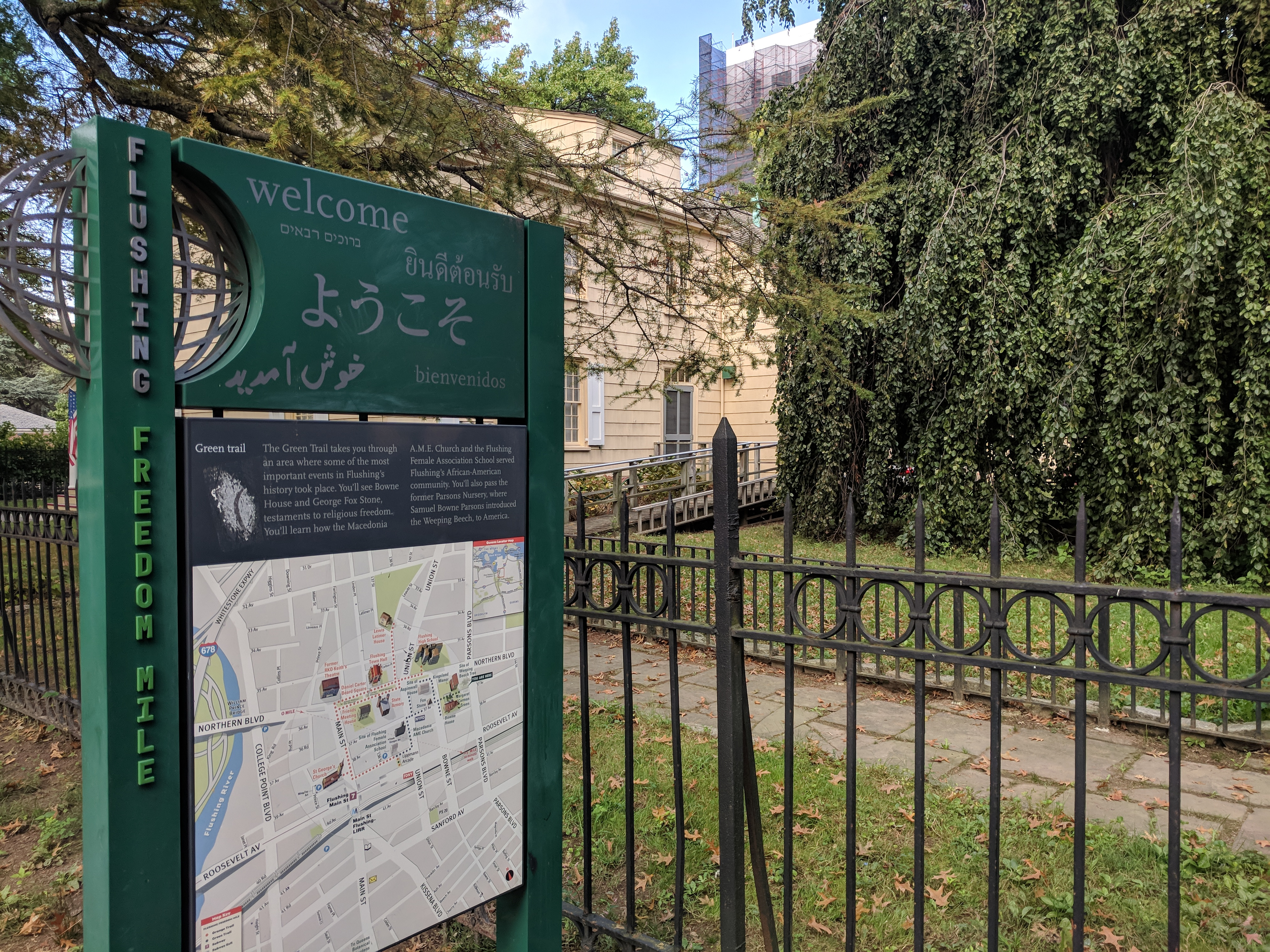
Sign on the heritage trail, denoting the Weeping Beech

The tree started suffering from poor health in the late 1960s, and was being given fertilizer in an unsuccessful attempt to prolong its life. By 1998, the New York City Department of Parks and Recreation declared the Weeping Beech to be dead. The city's parks commissioner held a "funeral" for the tree in December 1998 while the Parks Department decided what to do with the remains of the tree. In March 1999 it was decided that a 10-foot (3.0 m) section of the tree would remain in the park as a memorial. By then, the tree's progeny had been spread all over the United States. As of 2022, a large weeping beech occupies the site of the original weeping beech.

The rest of the tree would be given to artists to use for sculptures and benches along a heritage trail in downtown Flushing. A teacher at Flushing High School, Margaret I. Carman, had devised the idea for a trail; the park entrance at Bowne Street has a green named after her in honor of that vision.

== See also ==
- List of individual trees
