= Michael Costa =

Michael Costa may refer to:

- Michael Costa (conductor) (1808–1884), Italian-born conductor and composer
- Michael Costa (politician) (born 1956), Australian politician
- Michael Costa (American football), American football coach
- Mike Costa, American comic book and television writer

== See also ==
- Michel Fernando Costa (1981–2017), Brazilian footballer
- Michael Kosta, (born 1979), American comedian
