= Flushing High School =

Public high school in Queens, New York

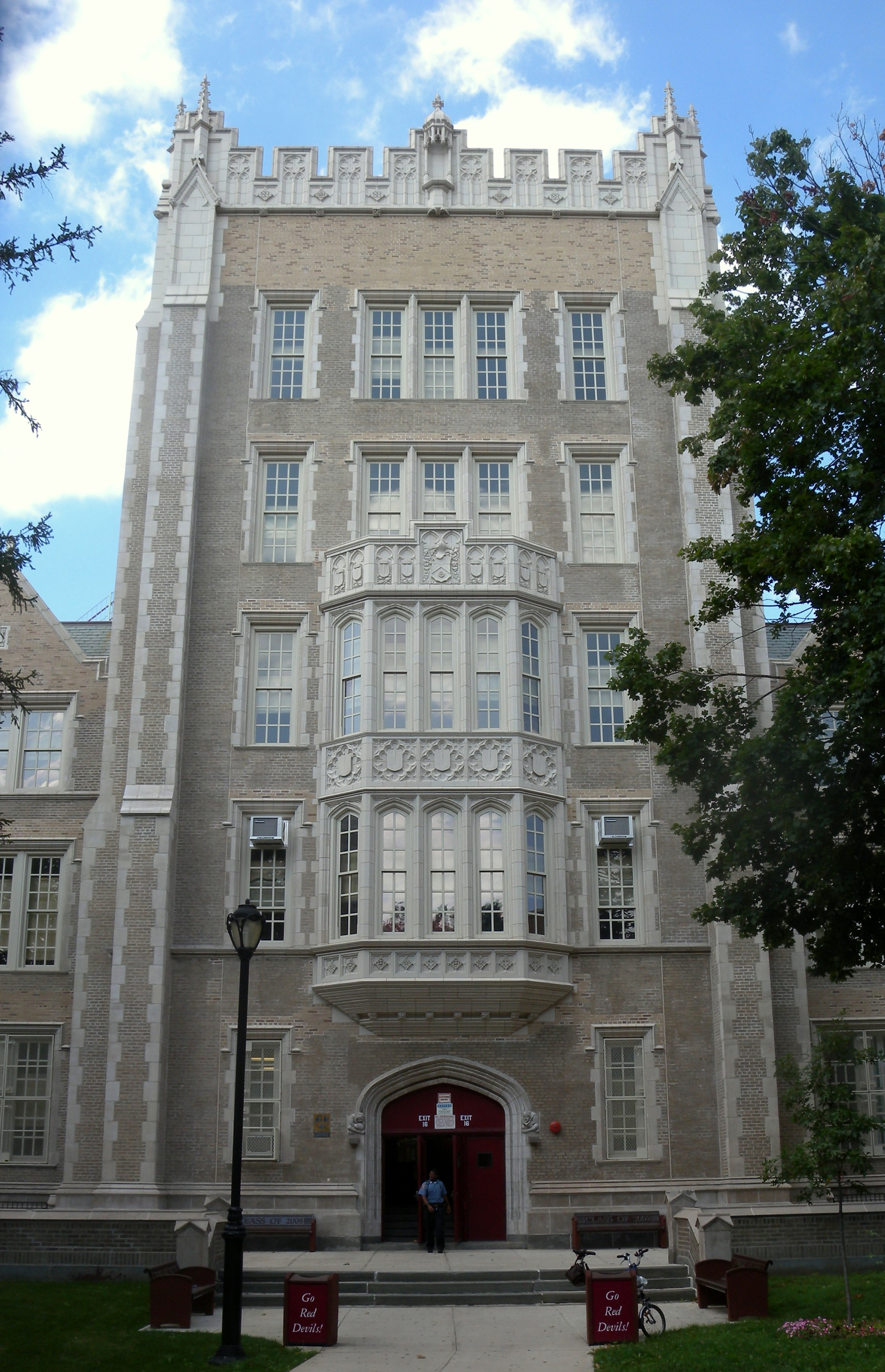

Location
- 35-01 Union St; Flushing, Queens, New York 11354; United States; 40°45′54″N 73°49′39″W

Information
- Type: Public
- Established: 1875; 151 years ago
- School district: New York City Department of Education
- School number: Q460
- NCES School ID: 360012201950
- Principal: Jessica Lee
- Teaching staff: 91.93 (on an FTE basis)
- Grades: 9-12
- Enrollment: 1,465 (2022–2023)
- Student to teacher ratio: 15.94
- Campus: City: Large
- Colors: Black, red and white
- Mascot: Red Devils
- Nickname: Flushing, FHS
- Team name: Flushing Red Devils/Lady Red Devils
- Yearbook: Gargoyle
- Website: www.flushinghs.org
- Flushing High School
- U.S. National Register of Historic Places
- New York State Register of Historic Places
- New York City Landmark
- Location within New York City Location within New York Location within the United States
- Location: 35-01 Union St; Queens, New York
- Area: 4.7 acres (1.9 ha)
- Built: 1912
- Architect: Snyder C.B.J.
- Architectural style: Tudor Revival, Collegiate Gothic
- NRHP reference No.: 91002036
- NYSRHP No.: 08101.006190
- NYCL No.: 1798

Significant dates
- Added to NRHP: February 10, 1992
- Designated NYSRHP: December 19, 1991
- Designated NYCL: January 18, 1991

Flushing High School is a four-year public high school in Flushing, in the New York City borough of Queens. The school is operated by the New York City Department of Education.

As of the 2020–21 school year, the school had an enrollment of 1,414 students and 92.67 classroom teachers (on an FTE basis), for a student–teacher ratio of 15.26:1. There were 1,173 students (83.0% of enrollment) eligible for free lunch and 64 (4.53% of students) eligible for reduced-cost lunch.

== History ==
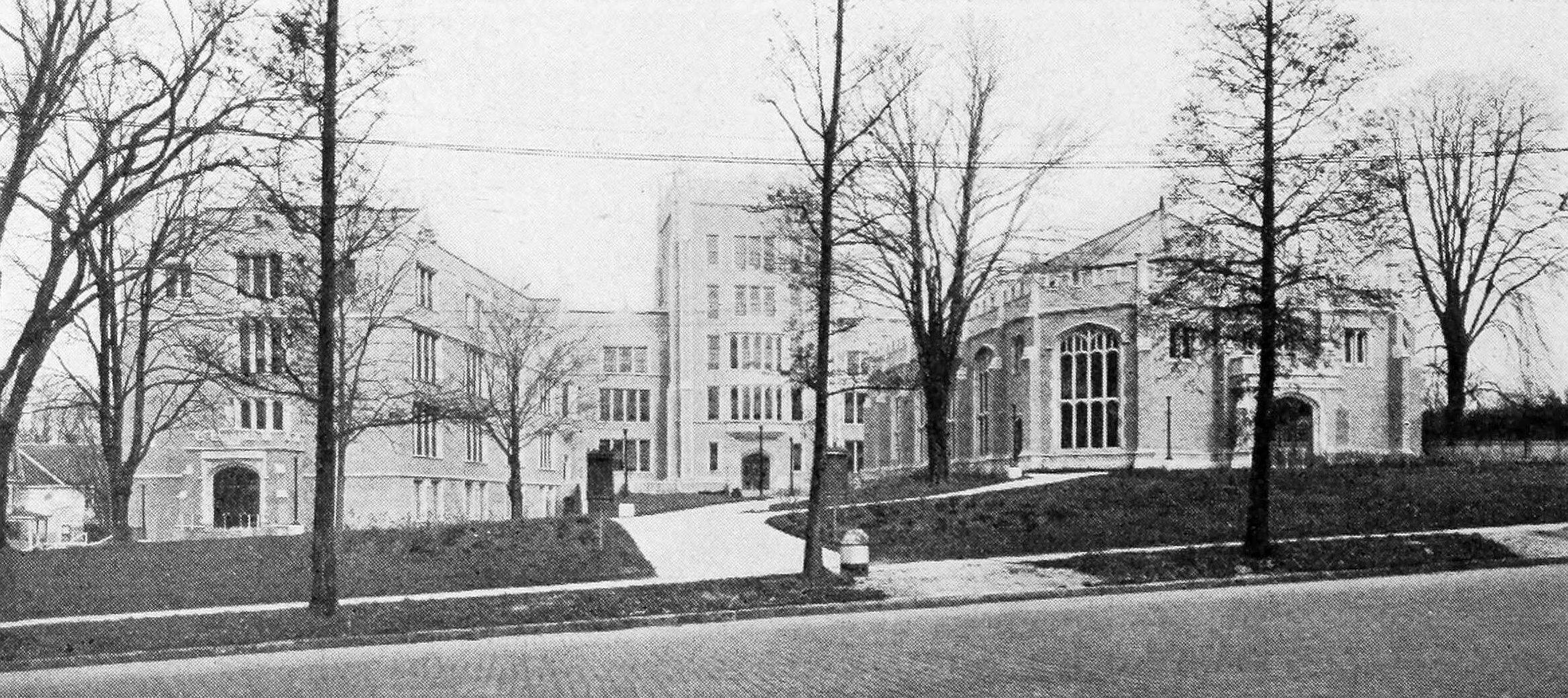
1917

Flushing High School was established by the Village of Flushing in 1875 prior to its consolidation with New York City and is the oldest public high school in the city. For decades, the school enjoyed a good reputation with local real estate sales brochures touting proximity to "famed Flushing High School" as late as the 1960s. By the 1980s, the student body ceased to be drawn from the local Jewish and Asian population. As of the 2010s, the school remained generally low-performing. In an attempt to improve conditions, the entire staff had to reapply for their positions in 2017. Since then, graduation rates have increased from 63% in 2017 to 83% in 2021.

Flushing High School was originally located on the northeast corner of Union Street and Sanford Avenue. It is currently located on Northern Boulevard, and housed in a distinctive Collegiate Gothic style building featuring turrets and gargoyles. It was built from 1912 to 1915, with another wing added in 1954. The WPA's Federal Art Project funded James Penney to paint four murals which were installed in 1938.

The building was designated as a landmark by the New York City Landmarks Preservation Commission in 1991. It was listed on the National Register of Historic Places in 1992.

== Notable alumni ==
- Dave Barbour (1912–1965), musician who played with Artie Shaw and Benny Goodman
- Jay Bromley (born 1992), defensive tackle who played in the XFL for the DC Defenders and also played in the NFL for the New York Giants
- Jerry Bock (1928–2010), musical theater composer who was co-author of the Broadway musical Fiddler On The Roof
- Lynn Burke (born 1943), Olympic gold medalist in swimming
- Calvin O. Butts (1949–2022, class of 1967), Pastor of the Abyssinian Baptist Church in Harlem and President of FHS Senior Class of 1967
- Godfrey Cambridge (1933–1976), African-American actor and comedian
- Margaret I. Carman (1890–1976), history teacher
- Robert Christgau (born 1942), music critic for The Village Voice
- Michael Costa (born c. 1948), American football coach who was head coach of the St. Augustine's Falcons football team from 2002 to 2014.
- Eddie Fogler (born 1948), University of North Carolina Tar Heels basketball star and former college basketball coach
- Nancy Gertner (born 1946), former United States District Judge of the United States District Court for the District of Massachusetts.
- Harry Kondoleon (1955–1994), playwright, Obie award-winner
- Lenny Lipton (born 1940), songwriter who was co-author of Peter, Paul & Mary's classic hit "Puff, the Magic Dragon".
- George Maharis (1928–2023), actor best known for his role on the TV show Route 66.
- Bobby McDermott (1914–1963; dropped out after his freshman year), 4x professional basketball champion (1 championship in the ABL, 3x champion in the NBL), 5x NBL MVP, Naismith Basketball Hall of Famer
- Paul Meltsner (1905–1966), WPA-era artist
- Joshua Prager, physician who specializes in pain medicine
- Harold Rosenbaum (born 1950), musician, conductor, founder of The New York Virtuoso Singers.
- Vincent Sardi Jr. (1915–2007), restaurateur
- Andy Shernoff (born 1955), songwriter and rock musician
- George Spitz (1912–1986), Olympic high jumper
- Webster Tarpley (born 1946, class of 1962), historian and political commentator
- Mary van Kleeck (1883–1972), social feminist active as a proponent of scientific management and a planned economy.
- Dave Von Ohlen (born 1958), former Major League Baseball relief pitcher for the St. Louis Cardinals and the Oakland Athletics
- Lawrence Walsh (1912–2014), Deputy Attorney General in Eisenhower Administration and Iran-Contra special prosecutor, 1986-1993
- Peter Zaremba, member of the band The Fleshtones.
