= Jay Bromley =

American football player (born 1992)

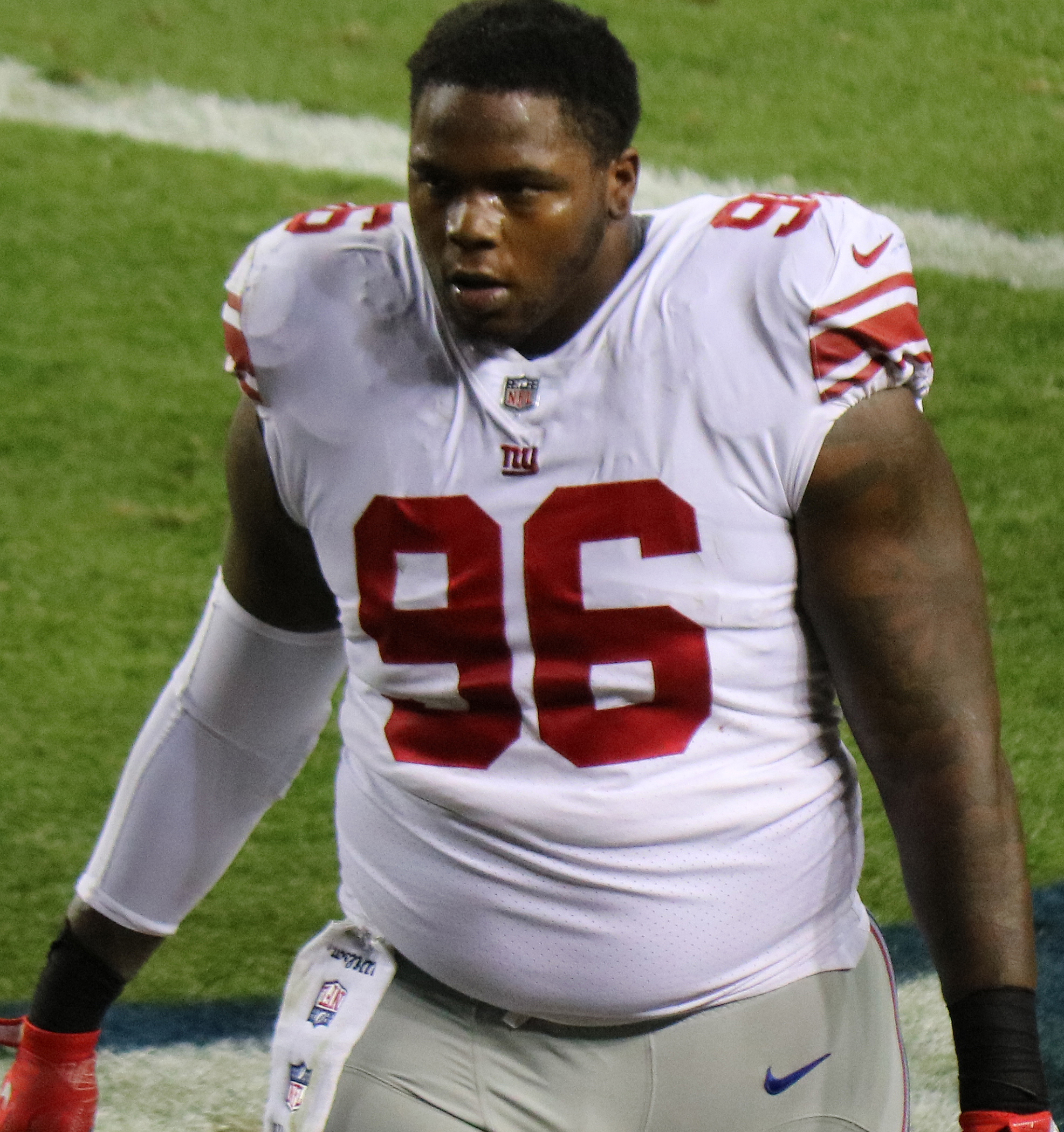
- Bromley with the New York Giants in 2017

No. 90, 96
- Position: Defensive tackle

Personal information
- Born: May 28, 1992 (age 34); Jamaica, New York, U.S.
- Listed height: 6 ft 3 in (1.91 m)
- Listed weight: 314 lb (142 kg)

Career information
- High school: Flushing (Flushing, New York)
- College: Syracuse
- NFL draft: 2014: 3rd round, 74th overall pick

Career history
- New York Giants (2014–2017); New Orleans Saints (2018); San Francisco 49ers (2019)*; DC Defenders (2020)
- * Offseason or practice squad member only

Career NFL statistics
- Total tackles: 80
- Sacks: 2
- Stats at Pro Football Reference

Jayson Craig Bromley, Jr. (born May 28, 1992) is an American former professional football player who was a defensive tackle in the National Football League (NFL). He was selected by the New York Giants in the third round of the 2014 NFL draft. He played college football for the Syracuse Orange.

== Early life ==
Bromley was born on May 28, 1992, in Jamaica, New York. His mother was addicted to crack and he was himself born with an addiction. His father, a pimp, beat one of his prostitutes after tying her to a radiator. She died, he was convicted of homicide, and sentenced to prison when Jay was just nine months old. Custody of Jay went to his aunt and uncle when he was four months old. He attended Flushing High School in Queens, New York, where he was named to the New York Post All-City First-team and was an all-borough selection following his senior season. He recorded 60 tackles and 12 sacks as a senior, while serving as team captain. He recorded over 40 sacks in his high school.

== College career ==
He did not receive much recruiting attention, and only had a walk-on option at Stony Brook University. By June of his senior year, he was without any scholarship offers. However, after an invite to the Outback Steakhouse Empire Challenge, Bromley dominated the event, earning himself MVP honors. In the coming days, he received a scholarship from Syracuse University, which he accepted. During his career at Syracuse, Bromley recorded 121 tackles, including 25.5 for loss, 14 sacks, and three forced fumbles. After leading his team in tackles for loss (14.5) and sacks (10), as a senior, he was named a third-team All-Atlantic Coast Conference (ACC) selection.

== Professional career ==
=== New York Giants ===
Bromley was selected by the New York Giants in the third round (74th overall) of the 2014 NFL draft.

In his four years with the Giants, Bromley played in 39 regular-season games as a reserve defensive tackle, recording 76 tackles, with a career-high 36 tackles in 2015.

=== New Orleans Saints ===
On May 14, 2018, Bromley signed with the New Orleans Saints. He was released on September 1, 2018. He was re-signed on September 18, 2018. He was placed on injured reserve on October 23, 2018, after suffering a torn biceps in Week 7.

=== San Francisco 49ers ===
On August 3, 2019, Bromley was signed by the San Francisco 49ers. He was released during final roster cuts on August 30, 2019.

=== DC Defenders ===
On November 22, 2019, Bromley was selected by the DC Defenders of the XFL in the 2020 XFL draft. He had his contract terminated when the league suspended operations on April 10, 2020.

Bromley had a tryout with the Chicago Bears on August 20, 2020.
