= Samuel Bowne Parsons =

American landscape architect

Samuel Bowne Parsons Jr.
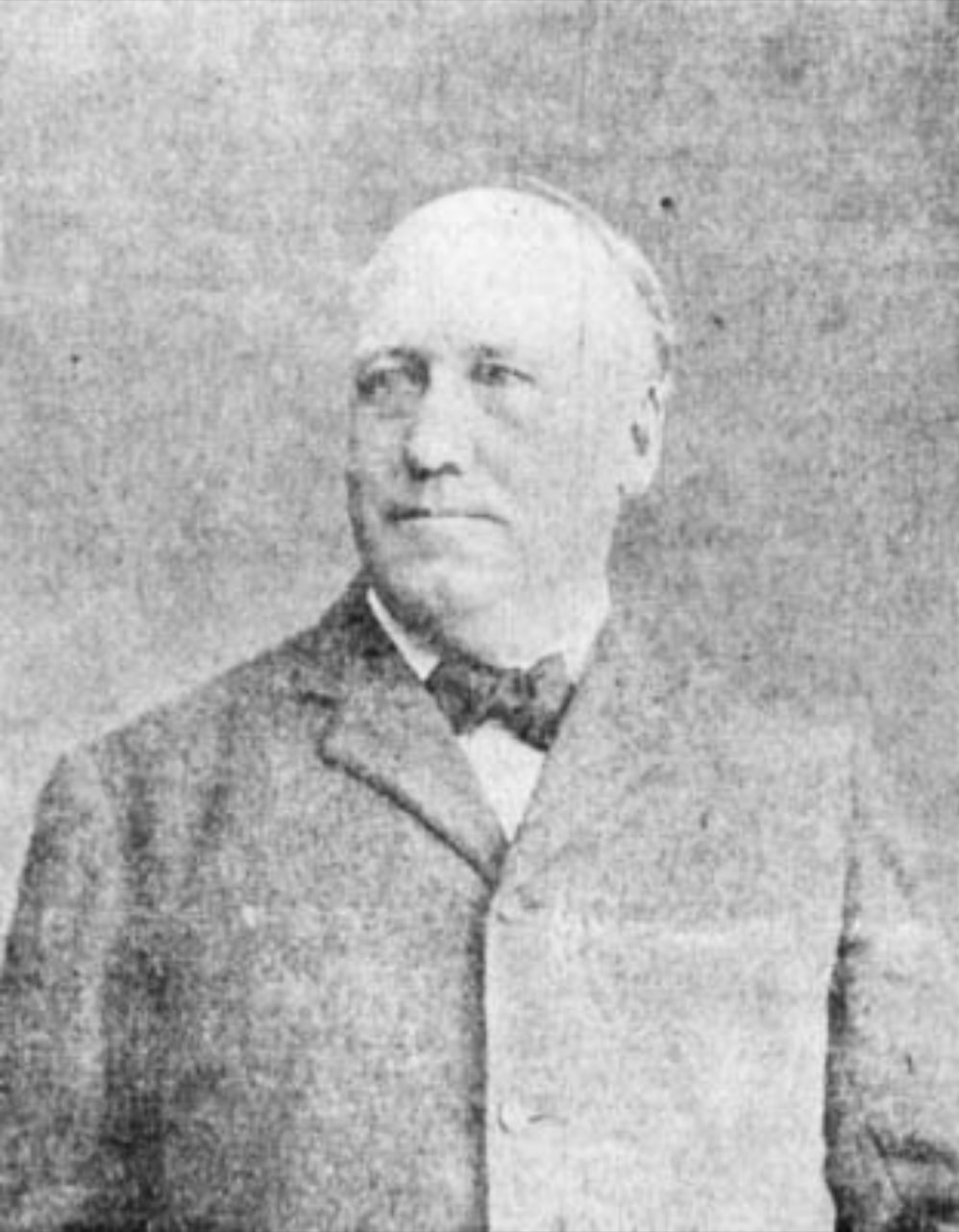
- Born: February 8, 1844; New Bedford, Massachusetts
- Died: February 3, 1923 (aged 78); New York City, New York
- Education: Yale University, Ph.B. (1862)
- Occupation: Landscape architect
- Spouse: Martha Elizabeth Francis (m. 1842)

5th President of the American Society of Landscape Architects
- In office 1905–1907
- Preceded by: John Charles Olmsted
- Succeeded by: Frederick Law Olmsted Jr.

2nd President of the American Society of Landscape Architects
- In office 1901–1902
- Preceded by: John Charles Olmsted
- Succeeded by: Nathan Franklin Barrett

Head Landscape Architect of New York City
- In office 1895–1911
- Preceded by: Calvert Vaux

Samuel Bowne Parsons Jr. (February 8, 1844 – February 3, 1923), was an American landscape architect. He is remembered as being a founder of the American Society of Landscape Architects, helping to establish the profession.

== Early years ==
Parsons was born February 8, 1844, in New Bedford, Massachusetts, to Samuel Bowne Parsons (1819–1906) and Susan R. Howland (1824–1854). His father was the son of Samuel Parsons (1774–1841), who moved to Flushing from Manhattan around 1800 and married Mary Bowne (1784–1839). His father was an accomplished and well noted horticulturist, who was the first to import Japanese maples and propagate rhododendrons. Parsons received his practical training and knowledge of landscaping and landscape materials working for J. R. Trumpy, the manager of his father’s nursery in Flushing, Queens.

Parsons then went to school at Yale University and graduated with a Bachelor's degree in philosophy in 1862, after which he spent several years studying and practicing farming. When he returned home to the family nursery, it had started supplying Frederick Law Olmsted and Calvert Vaux, two famous designers responsible for the Greensward Plan for New York City's Central Park. The site of the nursery is within present-day Kissena Park, and Parsons Boulevard, which runs through much of the family nursery's land, is named after him.

== Projects ==
Parsons became Vaux's apprentice from 1879 to 1884 and his partner from 1887-1895. When Vaux became the head landscape architect of the New York City Parks Department, with him came Parsons, who took over the unpaid position of Superintendent of Planting. After Vaux's death in 1895, Parsons became the new head landscape architect of New York City and remained there until 1911, when he was fired by Charles B. Stover during a bitter personal dispute. During Parsons' partnership with Vaux, the two produced many notable designs, including Abingdon Square and Christopher Street Park, both in Greenwich Village; the restoration of the Ladies Pond in Central Park, which at the time was infested with malaria carrying mosquitos; the siting of Grant's Tomb in Riverside Park and the completion of Morningside Park. In collaboration with architect Stanford White, Parsons and Vaux also produced the Washington Memorial Arch in Washington Square Park and the Grand Army Plaza Arch near Prospect Park in Brooklyn. Throughout their tenure together Parsons noticed that Vaux was a very passionate believer in naturalistic parks, but was reluctant to push himself forward.

After Vaux’s death, Parsons went on to design Balboa Park (then known as City Park) in San Diego, Albemarle Park in Asheville, North Carolina, St. Nicholas Park in New York City, a Dutch Garden for Van Cortlandt Park in the Bronx, and a redesign of Union Square to accommodate a new subway station. New York City was the main beneficiary of Parsons' designs; they included numerous bathrooms, some designed to resemble Greek temples.

In 1899, Parsons founded the American Society of Landscape Architects (ASLA) in conjunction with ten other well established practitioners on a basis of three tenets:

1. To establish landscape architecture as a recognized profession in North America.
2. To develop educational studies in landscape architecture.
3. To provide a voice of authority in the "New Profession."

From 1901–1902 and 1905–1907, Parsons served as the President of the American Society of Landscape Architects.

Parsons published numerous magazine articles and at least six books on landscape gardening throughout his life. He depended on media publicity to accomplish a goal only once; he sought help from local newspapers to help rid Central Park of shantytowns.

Throughout his professional career, Parsons was known for his ability to merge elegant plantings and the extensive knowledge he had gained from his father with the native environment without disrupting the Genius Loci (the spirit of place) of the sites he designed. He was able to maintain his design characteristics in all of his design projects without completely copying his earlier work. He remains a founding father of the modern day landscape architecture institution, and his designs are still visible throughout the United States, primarily in San Diego’s Balboa Park and New York City's Union Square.

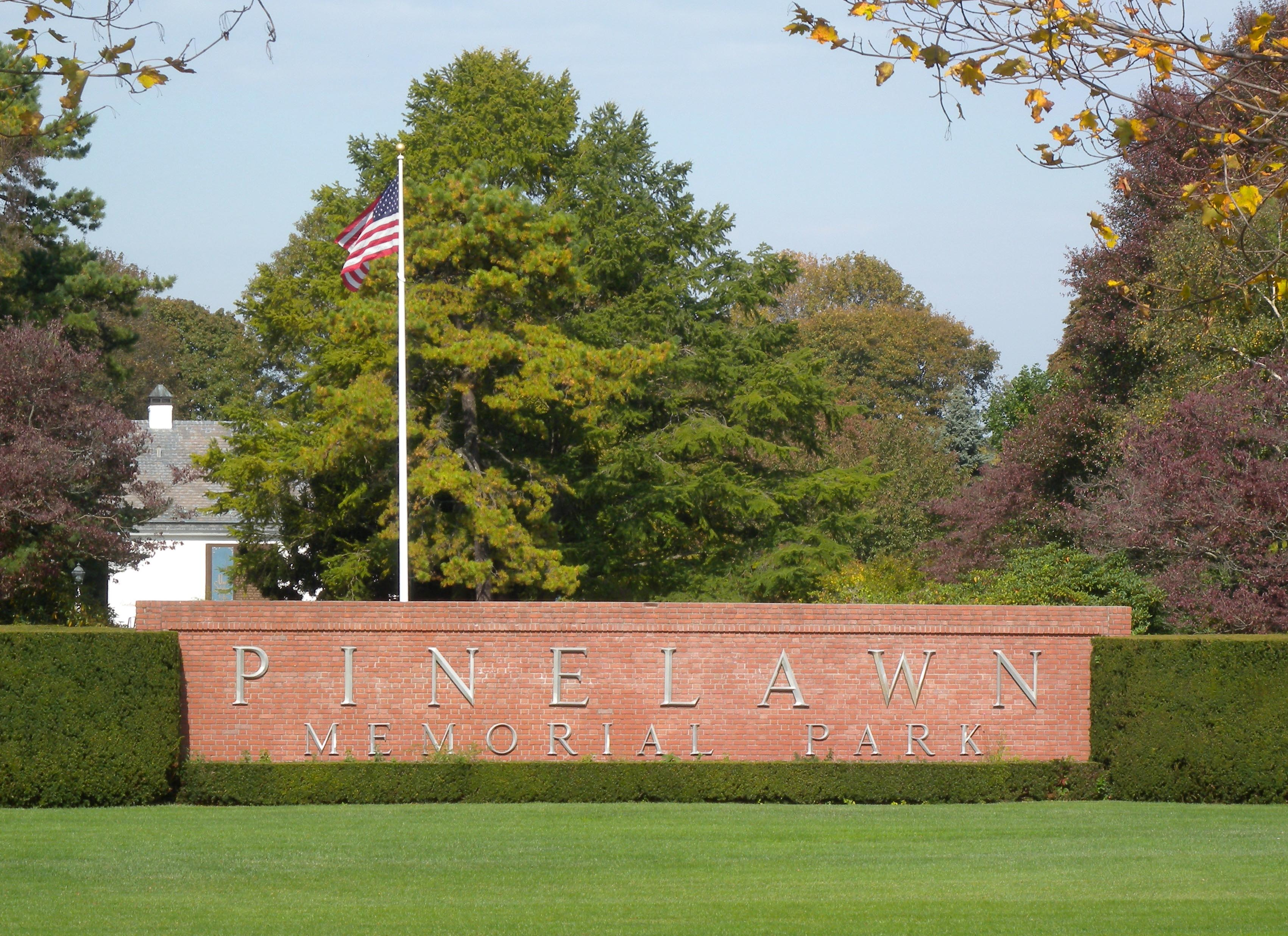
Pinelawn Memorial Park

Parsons' most notable designs outside of New York City are Balboa Park in San Diego, California, and Pinelawn Memorial Park on Long Island.

== American Chestnut Tree ==
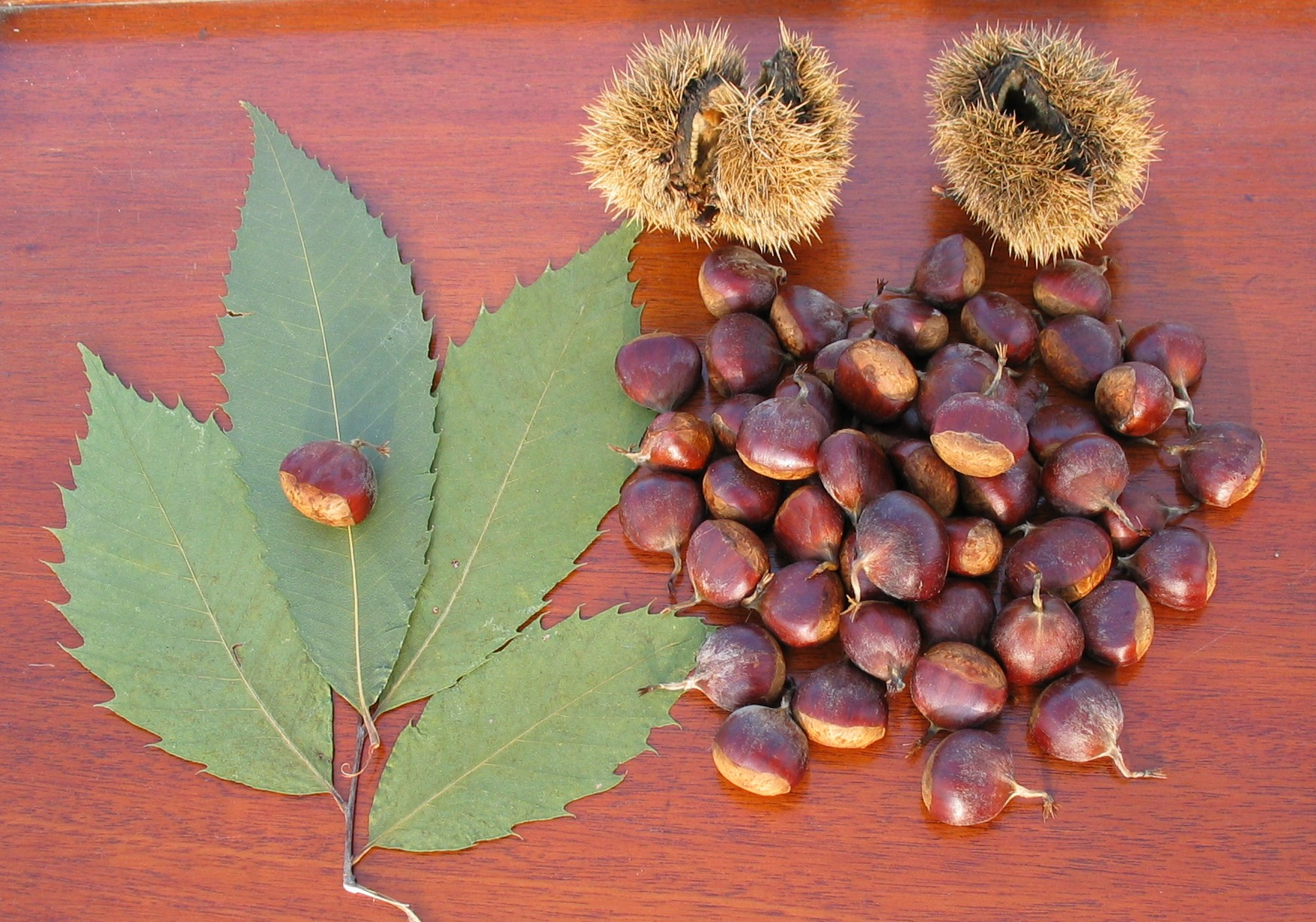
American chestnuts

Before the early 1900s, one in every four hardwood trees in North America's eastern forests was an American chestnut. Together with oaks they predominated in 80 million hectares of forest from Maine to Florida and west to the Ohio Valley, reaching heights of up to 40 metres (130 ft) and growing two meters around the middle. Chestnuts sometimes piled so high on the forest floor that people would scoop them up with shovels. Both humans and a wide variety of animals relied on this abundant and easily gathered resource for food, particularly in winter.

Chestnut trees also had significant economic value. American carpenters preferred chestnut over other materials for making certain products. Lightweight, rot-resistant, straight-grained and easy to work with, chestnut wood was used to build houses, barns, telegraph poles, railroad ties, furniture and even musical instruments.

In 1876, Parsons imported Japanese chestnut trees which he then sold to customers in several states across the country. Some of these shipments concealed the pathogenic fungus Cryphonectria parasitica. The disease chokes the trees to death by wedging itself into their trunks and obstructing conduits for water and nutrients. Asian chestnut trees evolved a resistance but their North American relatives were highly susceptible to chestnut blight.

First discovered in New York State in 1904, the blight was soon spotted in New Jersey, Connecticut, Massachusetts, and Pennsylvania. Within 50 years, C. parasitica killed nearly four billion chestnut trees. The species has been almost completely extirpated within its native range in one of the greatest ecological catastrophes in American history.

== Notable designs ==
- Abingdon Square Park, Manhattan, New York City
- DeWitt Clinton Park, Manhattan, New York City
- Ladies Pond, Central Park, Manhattan, New York City
- Morningside Park, Manhattan, New York City
- Washington Square Arch at Washington Square Park, Manhattan, New York City
- Soldiers' and Sailors' Arch at Grand Army Plaza, Brooklyn, New York City
- Balboa Park, San Diego, California
- Albemarle Park, Asheville, North Carolina
- St. Nicholas Park, Manhattan, New York City
- Union Square, Manhattan, New York City
- Pine Lawn Cemetery, Long Island, New York

== See also ==
- History of gardening
- Garden real estate
- The Weeping Beech, a tree planted by Parsons
