= Kissena Park =

Public park in Queens, New York

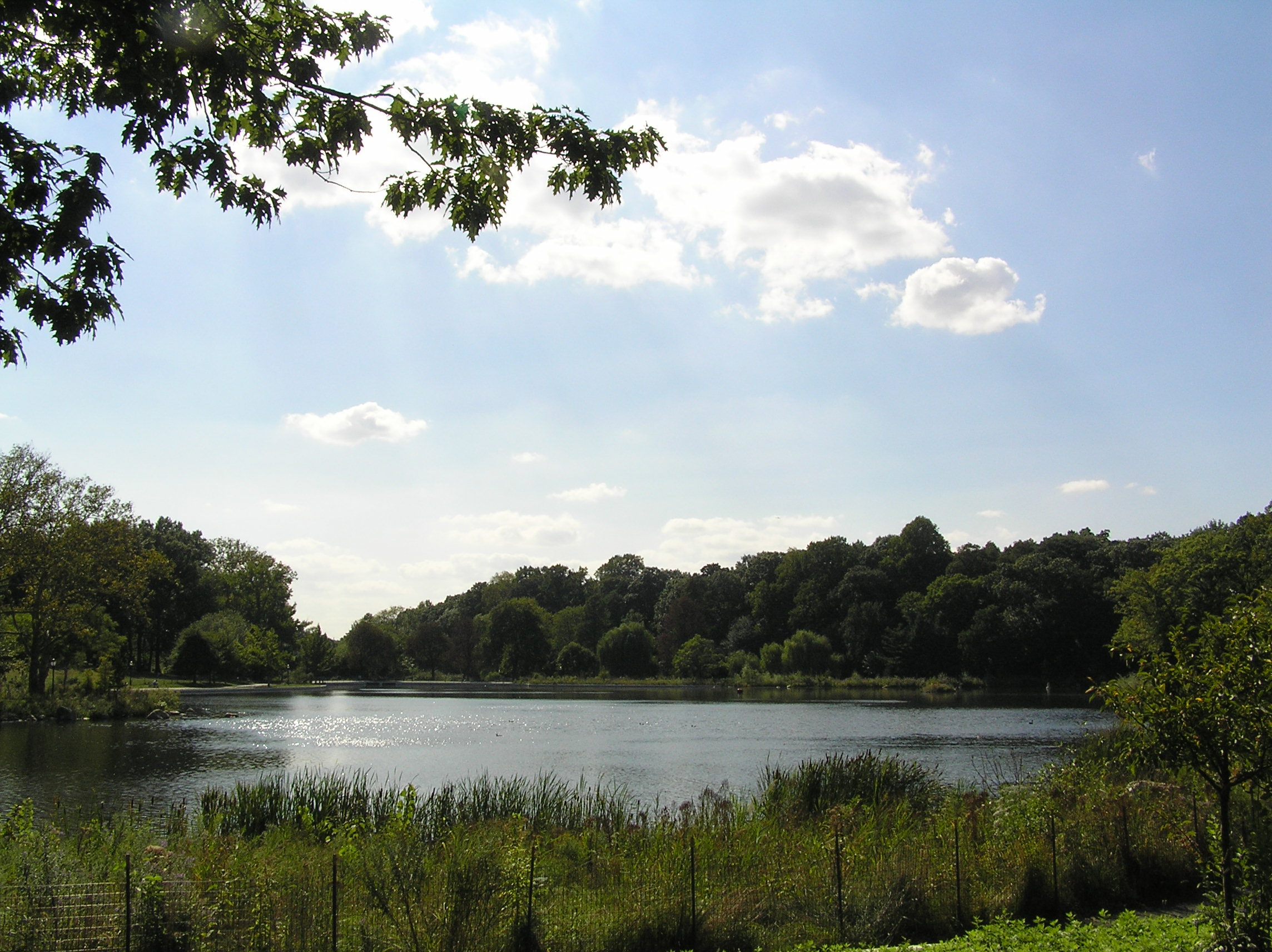
- A view from the eastern end of the park overlooking the largest aspect of the park, the pond.
- Interactive map of Kissena Park
- Type: Public park
- Location: Flushing, New York
- Coordinates: 40°44′42″N 73°48′17″W
- Area: 234.762 acres (95.005 ha)
- Operator: New York City Department of Parks and Recreation

Kissena Park is a 235-acre (95 ha) park located in the neighborhood of Flushing in Queens, New York City. It is located along the subterranean Kissena Creek, which flows into the Flushing River. It is bordered on the west by Kissena Boulevard; on the north by Rose, Oak, Underhill, and Lithonia Avenues; on the east by Fresh Meadow Lane; and on the south by Booth Memorial Avenue. The park contains the city's only remaining velodrome, a lake of the same name, two war memorials, and various playgrounds and sports fields.

The site of Kissena Park was originally part of a tree nursery operated by Samuel Parsons in the late 19th century, though parts of the park were also the site of a Long Island Rail Road line. The lake on Parsons's property was named "Kissena", which comes from the Chippewa language meaning "it is cold", "cold place", or "cool water", and the park was later named after the lake. After Parsons died in 1906, part of his former nursery was incorporated in the modern-day park. The name "Kissena Park" can also refer to a residential section of Flushing just north of the park.

Kissena Park opened in 1910, and it was incorporated into Kissena Corridor Park in the mid-1950s. Various improvement projects have been conducted during Kissena Park's history, including the addition of the velodrome in 1962 and restorations of the lake in 1942 and 1983. Subsequently, the Kissena Velodrome was restored and rededicated in 2004, and a Korean War memorial was dedicated in 2007.

== Description ==
Kissena Park is bounded by Booth Memorial Avenue to the south; Kissena Boulevard to the west; Rose, Oak, Underhill, and Lithonia Avenues to the north; and Fresh Meadows Lane to the east. The south side of the park is mostly meadow land. Kissena Park contains a small lake, Kissena Lake, on the northeast corner. Formerly a wetland, it was transformed into a "bathtub lake" during a 1942 renovation. A freshwater marsh is located on the southern shore of the lake. The Historic Grove is located on a 14-acre (5.7 ha) site on the north end of the park, and contains trees from a nursery that formerly occupied the park site. It contains an old-growth forest that existed prior to the park's creation.

The 400-meter (1,300 ft) Kissena Velodrome, at the center of the park, is used for track cycling and is the city's only remaining bicycle track. The velodrome hosts multiple bicycling programs, including Star Track. (Note: For further velodrome information, see List of cycling tracks and velodromes.)

The rest of the park contains various playgrounds, soccer fields, tennis courts, and baseball fields. A Korean War memorial is located at a northern entrance to Kissena Park, at Parsons Boulevard and Rose Avenue. Another memorial, a boulder with an inscription dedicated to World War I soldiers from Queens, is located on the southern shore of Kissena Lake.

Kissena Park is located in the center of the Kissena Corridor Park, a mostly continuous chain of parks several miles long, and is part of the Brooklyn-Queens Greenway. The corridor, in turn, runs along the path of a former Long Island Rail Road line that was originally known as Central Railroad of Long Island. A plaque commemorating the railroad is located at the northwest corner of the park. Bicycle paths connect the park westward to Main Street. The former Long Island Motor Parkway, now a bike path, connects Kissena Park with Cunningham Park and Alley Pond Park via the Kissena Corridor.

== Etymology ==
Kissena Park and the adjacent Kissena Corridor Park are named after Kissena Lake. The word "Kissena" is from the Chippewa language meaning "it is cold", "cold place", or "cool water". The Chippewa (Ojibwe) Native Americans are not native to the New York area, but rather to the Midwestern United States. However, the New York area was inhabited by the Canarsee and Rockaway Lenape groups, who are Algonquian peoples along with the Chippewa. The name was given to the lake by horticulturalist Samuel Bowne Parsons (father of Samuel Parsons Jr.), who operated a nursery near the lake in the late 1800s.

Kissena and Kissena Corridor Parks share the name with Kissena Boulevard which runs north-to-south between the two parks, and Kissena Creek, which formerly ran through the park. The area of Flushing surrounding the two parks is also informally known as "Kissena Park".

== History ==
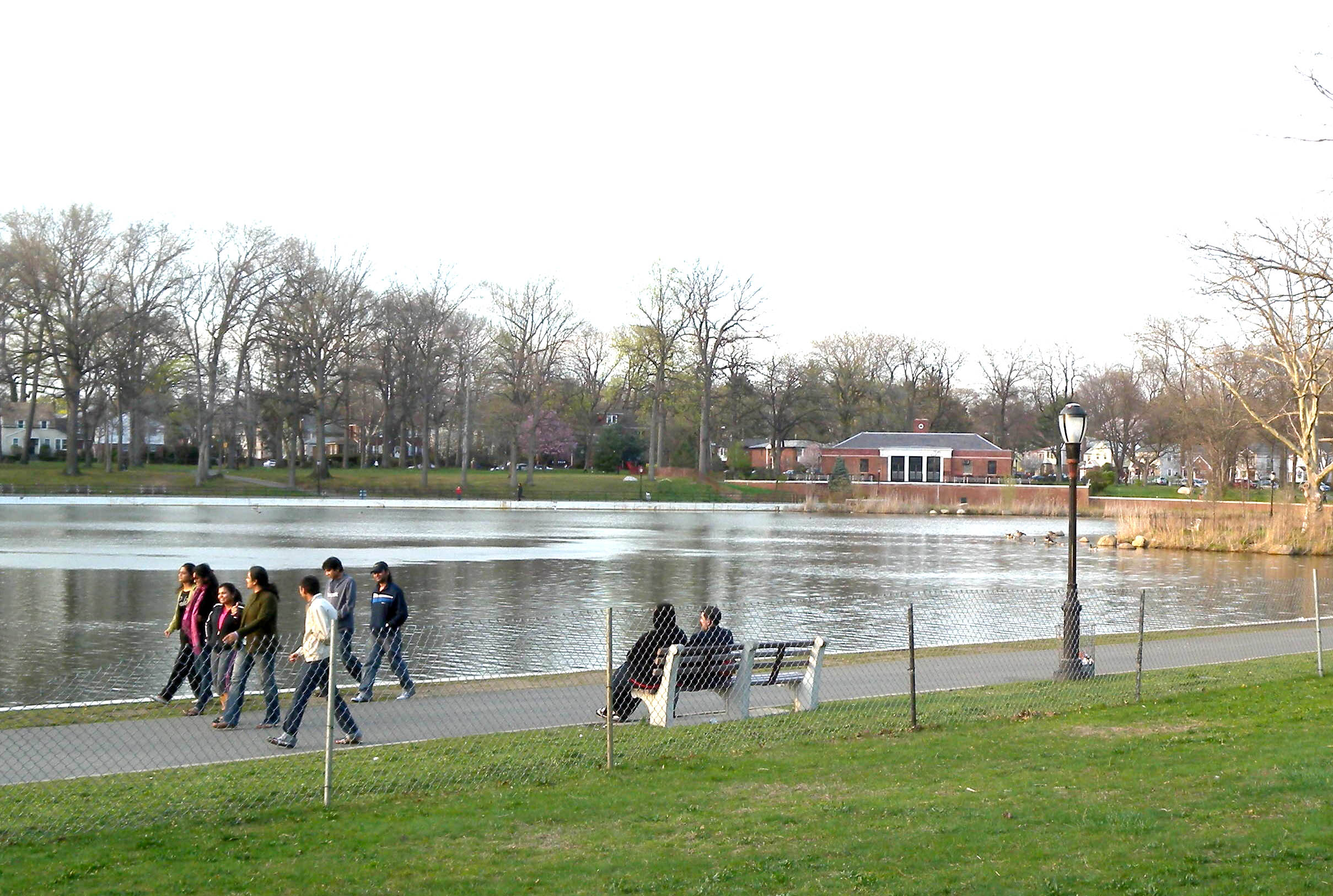
Dusk at Kissena Park

=== Origins ===
Kissena Park's natural features were formed during the Wisconsin glaciation, about 20,000 years ago. The site of Flushing Meadows–Corona Park, slightly west of Kissena Park, was originally part of the ancestral path of the Hudson River, and the present-day Kissena Lake was located on the eastern shore of the river. The glacier covered much of Long Island, where Queens is located, and formed a terminal moraine through the center of the island. One of these recesses became Kissena Lake. When the glacier receded, it created several recesses in the land, some of which were filled with water. The topography of Flushing and Northeast Queens was formed during this time, including the creation of Kissena Lake. Glaciation also created a natural source of well water for the area.

Kissena Lake was part of a watercourse called Kissena Creek, previously known as Mill Creek or Ireland Mill Creek, which ran east-to-west through what are now Kissena Park and Kissena Corridor Park. The creek began at a swamp in the modern Kew Gardens Hills and Pomonok areas south of Kissena Park. Past the swamp, the creek traveled east parallel to 72nd Avenue, then turning north in modern Fresh Meadows, traveling parallel to today's Utopia Parkway to the modern Kissena Park Golf Course just south of Flushing Cemetery. The creek then turned west through the modern Kissena Park, Kissena Corridor Park, and Queens Botanical Garden sites before meeting Flushing Creek at what is now the Fountain of Planets / Pool of Industry in Flushing Meadows. The system included several lakes, including Kissena Lake, as well as a pond in Fresh Meadows now occupied by the Utopia Playground. The system of waterways was mostly a wetland area.

The very first people to occupy the area were the Native Americans, though little evidence remains of their settlements. The site was then settled by Dutch and English settlers who founded the town of Flushing.

=== Parsons Nurseries ===
In 1868, Samuel Parsons opened Parsons Nurseries, one of the earliest commercial gardens, near what is now Fresh Meadows Lane. With help of a team of collectors, Parsons Nurseries found exotic trees and shrubs to import into the United States, and its advertisements filled gardening magazines with depictions of these exotic plants. During the late 1880s, Parsons Nurseries was importing 10,000 Japanese maples into the United States each year with help from Swiss immigrant John R. Trumpy. Parsons Nurseries also was the first to introduce the California privet in the United States from Japan.

Kissena Lake was initially used as a mill pond. Parsons later used Kissena Lake for ice cutting, where surface ice from lakes and rivers is collected and stored in ice houses and use or sale as a cooling method before mechanical refrigeration was available. However, as recently as the 1900s, both Kissena Lake and Gutman's Swamp served as a habitat for wood duck. Just east of the lake was a water pumping station. It was used first by the College Point Water Works, then by the Citizens Water Supply Company of Newtown, and finally as a city-owned pumping station.

Samuel Parsons's children, Samuel Bowne Parsons and Robert Bowne Parsons, later took over running the nursery, and by 1898, Samuel Bowne Parsons's son George H. Parsons, had taken over as superintendent of Parsons Nurseries. Later that year, George was found in the lavatory by his father; he had died of heart failure. Parsons Nurseries closed in 1901.

=== Creation ===
The land was acquired for Kissena Park (then called Kissena Lake Park) between 1904 and 1914. The family of Samuel Bowne Parsons had sold off his nursery following his 1906 death. The nursery was located at the north end of the modern park at Parsons Boulevard and Rose Avenue. Real estate developers John W. Paris and Edward McDougal (or MacDougall) bought most of the Parsons land. This land was used to create the "Kissena Park" residential development. New York City bought the rest of the Parsons land and a few other land parcels to create Kissena Park. A 14-acre (5.7 ha) tract of Parsons's exotic specimens was preserved and is now the Historic Grove.

In 1907, Paris and McDougal were accused of graft and fraud after they attempted to sell 87 acres (35 ha) of land back to the city at inflated prices, earning $140,000 as a result. A grand jury was convened to investigate the transaction. Joseph Bermel, the Queens borough president at the time, was later found to be involved in the deal, having allegedly received $12,000 from the transaction. In March 1908, the grand jury recommended that those involved be found guilty of graft. Later that month, Bermel was charged with perjury and bribery after he tried to hide his involvement in the scandal. He resigned his post as borough president in April 1908 and was subsequently scheduled to give testimony at a grand jury trial, but fled the United States the day before he was to testify. Bermel's lawyer and brother were also charged with perjury.

The actual construction of the park involved draining and filling in the marshland that made up the majority of the park's area. Kissena Park opened in 1910, while the World War I memorial knoll on the south side of Kissena Lake was dedicated in 1921. Kissena Park was originally envisioned as the primary park of Queens, similar to Central Park in Manhattan and Prospect Park in Brooklyn. It contained landscaping, similar to both parks: the western end of Kissena Lake drained into the creek and was traversed by a bridge, similar to Central Park's Gapstow Bridge. The park also included a gazebo and a swimming pool with lake water, both of which were removed.

=== Incorporation into Kissena Corridor Park ===
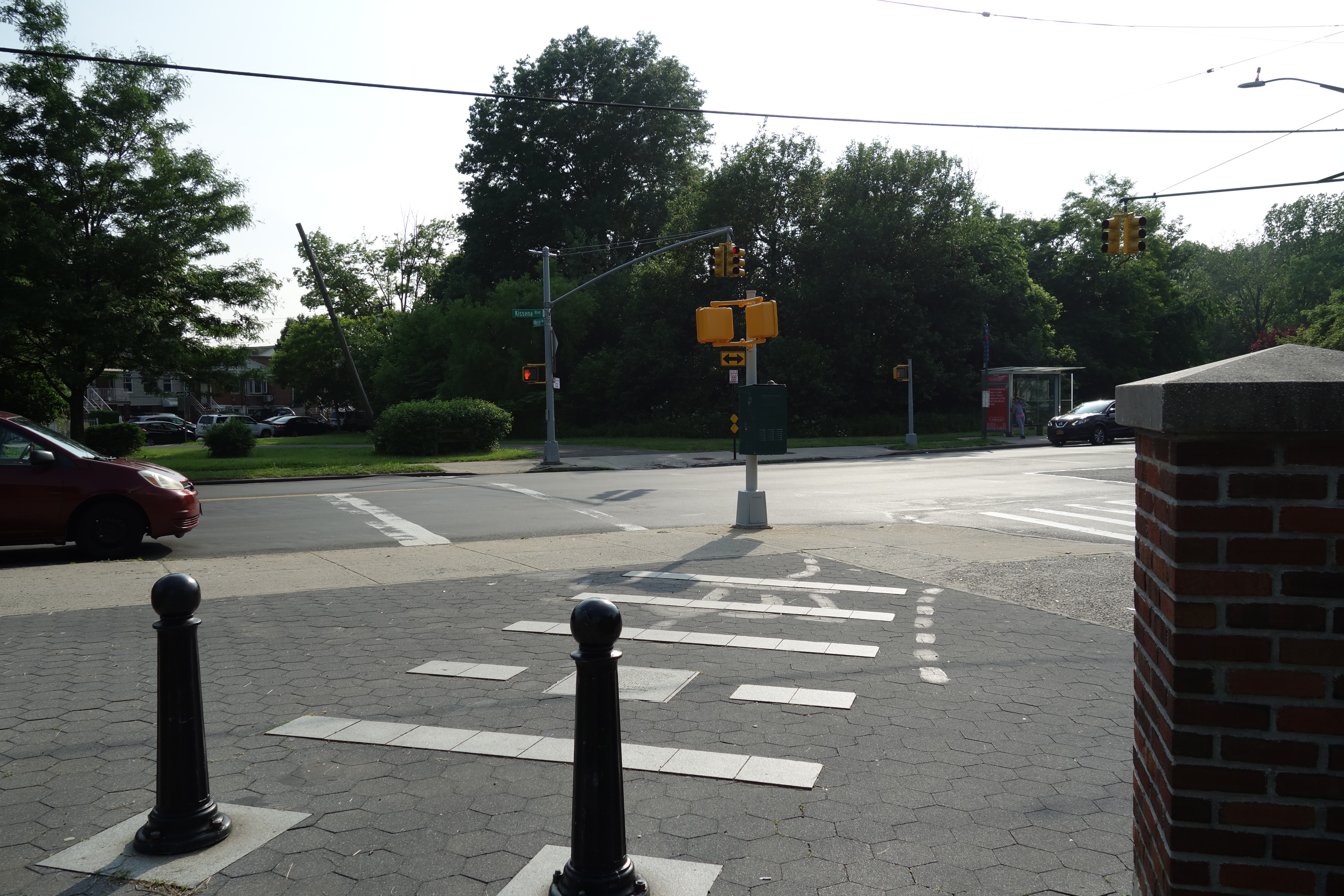
Stewart Railroad right-of-way at the northwest corner of Kissena Park

Kissena Park is located on a 19th-century railroad right-of-way. A raised nature trail running through Kissena Park was originally the main line of the Central Railroad of Long Island of A.T. Stewart (later the White Line or Creedmoor branch of the Long Island Rail Road). It ran from Flushing to Bellerose and was later extended from Bellerose to Garden City.

In August 1940, the New York City Board of Estimate approved Queens Borough President George U. Harvey's request to acquire the former Stewart Railroad right-of-way from Flushing Meadows at Lawrence Street (College Point Boulevard) east to Fresh Meadow Road (now Utopia Parkway). The right-of-way was acquired into two tracts. The western tract west of Kissena Park and Kissena Boulevard extended 1 mile (1.6 km) with an average width of 500 feet (150 m). The eastern segment also extended one mile past Kissena Park, with an average width of 85 feet (26 m). The western stretch of the land west of Kissena Boulevard was to become the Kissena Corridor Park, which would connect Flushing Meadows and Kissena Parks. The eastern stretch of the land would be developed into a second corridor called the "Cunningham Corridor", which would connect Kissena Park with Cunningham Park further southeast. The corridors would include playgrounds, sports fields, park trails, and bicycle and bridle paths which would connect to existing paths in Cunningham Park.

The Kissena Corridor project was also supposed to include the construction of a major storm sewer through the corridor, which the Parks Department said was necessitated as a result of "the great extent of this natural drainage basin." In 1942, the federal War Production Board barred the construction of the Corridor Sewer, due to steel requirements for the World War II effort. Groundbreaking ceremonies for the sewer project were held on April 1, 1947, at the intersection of Lawrence Street and Fowler and Blossom Avenues, near the modern-day Queens Botanical Garden west of Kissena Park. On February 19, 1948, the final contract for the project, including the trunk line from 188th Street to Francis Lewis Boulevard, was authorized from the Board of Estimate. On February 27, the Queens borough sewer engineer announced that the cost of the sewer project would run to over $10 million, $2.25 million higher than the previous figure. The main trunk of the Corridor Sewer was completed by September 1948, although many of the feeder lines had yet to be constructed.

At the end of the 1939–40 New York World's Fair in 1940, debris from the demolition of the fair exhibits was used to fill the section of the future Kissena Corridor west of Main Street (today's Queens Botanical Garden). By 1941, the New York City Department of Sanitation led by Commissioner William F. Carey began planning to fill the Kissena Corridor site between Main Street and Kissena Boulevard with municipal waste as a landfill. Afterward, the landfill would be excavated to install the sewer, and would act as a cover for the sewer. At the time, using garbage to fill the marshlands was considered more economical than filling it with clean dirt. In addition, the fill would help mitigate mosquitoes which inhabited the area around Kissena Creek. An existing landfill was already present on Rose Avenue in Kissena Park. This dump, which collected ashes, garbage, and refuse from Flushing, began operations in the 1930s. A second Kissena Park landfill on North Hempstead Turnpike (Booth Memorial Avenue) was opened on November 14, 1943 and closed in July 1945.

Concurrently with the Kissena Corridor project, Kissena Lake was dredged in 1942 as part of a Works Progress Administration initiative. This transformed Kissena Lake into a "bathtub lake". Prior to the renovation, Kissena Lake was part of a wetland, which was believed to be a worthless type of land during the 20th century. A later renovation entailed categorization and major cleanup of the tree groves by Parks Department interns.

In May 1951, Robert Moses announced plans to raise the grade the western stretch of Kissena Corridor Park between Flushing Meadows and 164th Street, including Kissena Park, by using it as a temporary garbage dump. Moses had already began filling the sites of other future parks with municipal waste, including Spring Creek Park and Marine Park in Brooklyn. The plans were opposed by Queens Borough President Maurice A. FitzGerald. On June 7, 1951, Moses eliminated plans for the dump, as well as an extension of 146th Street that had been planned along with the dump. The western stretch of the Kissena Corridor was eventually landfilled in the 1950s from dirt excavated for the construction of the Long Island Expressway.

==== Kissena Velodrome ====
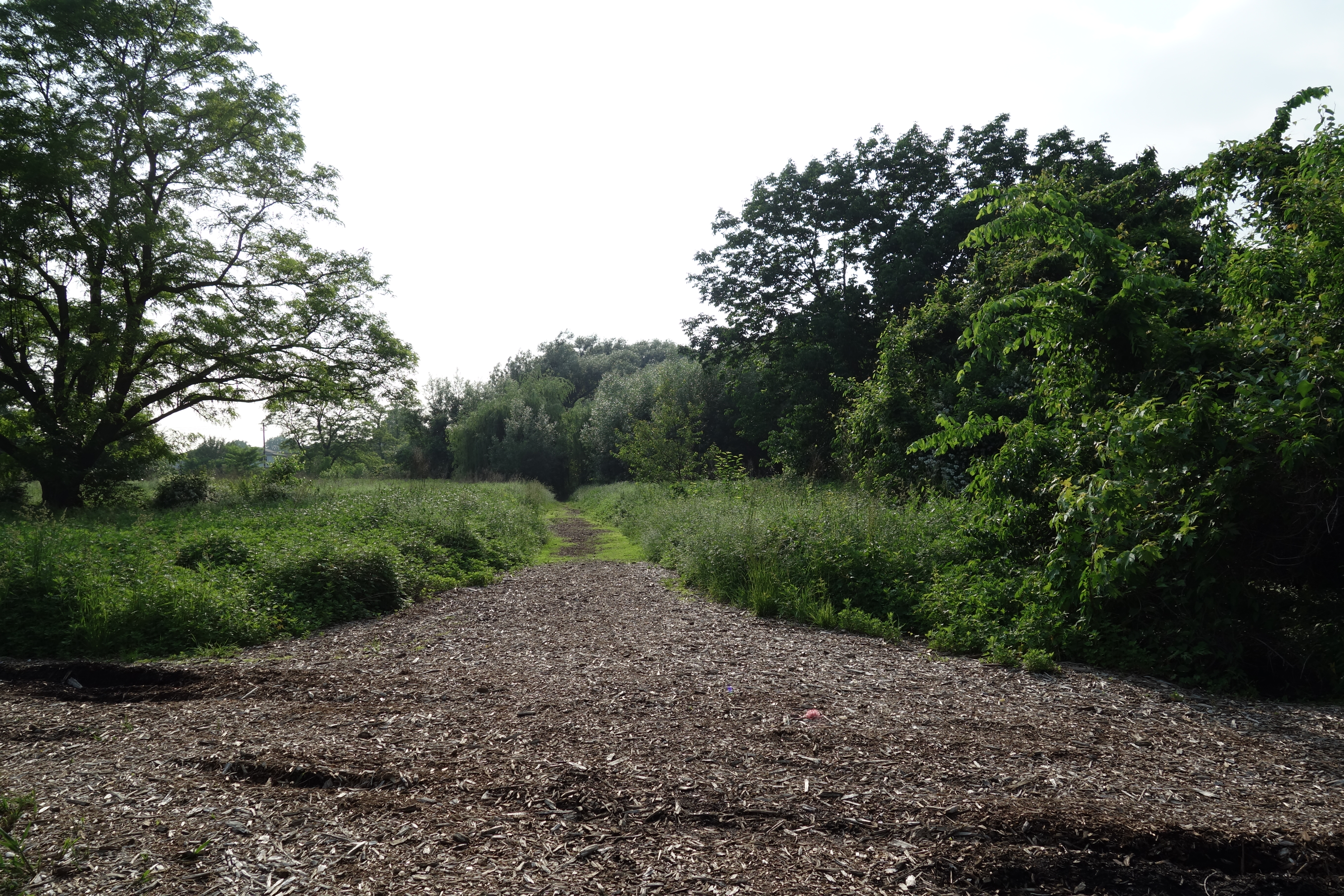
The Stewart Railroad rail trail in Kissena Park

The Kissena Velodrome, a 400-meter (1,300 ft) velodrome, was constructed in the center of the park in 1962. It was used during the 1964 New York World's Fair and the U.S. team trials for the 1964 Summer Olympics. It is the only remaining bicycle track in New York City.

=== Deterioration and restoration ===
By the 1980s, the park was being used as an illegal dumping ground. Algae buildup in Kissena Lake necessitated another restoration project, which was undertaken in 1983. Subsequently, a local naturalist named Charlie Emerson started planting a garden in 1986. The garden and an adjoining nature center were dedicated for Emerson in 1990.

In 2003, a $2.3 million restoration drained the lake in stages, resulting in its current appearance. The city water was replaced with well water, an aeration system was installed the concrete bulkheads were replaced with natural-looking materials such as rocks and plants, and a small island for birds and turtles was built within the lake.

In 2007, the Korean War memorial was unveiled at the park's northern entrance at Parsons Boulevard. The memorial, designed by William Crozier, commemorates Korean War veterans from Queens. Its centerpiece is a bronze sculpture called The Anguish of Experience, which depicts "a solitary soldier whose face portrays the agony of war", followed by five soldiers who carry a stretcher.

The Velodrome had deteriorated over the years, and, by 2000, efforts were underway to renovate the track. The Kissena Velodrome was restored, and the track was rededicated in 2004. City officials announced in 2022 that they would replace a dirt path leading to the Kissena Velodrome with a concrete path at a cost of $6.25 million.
