= Michael Costa (American football) =

American football player and coach

Biographical details
- Born: c. 1948 (age 77–78)
- Education: Norfolk State (1971)

Playing career
- c. 1968: Prairie View A&M
- c. 1970: Norfolk State
- Position: Defensive back

Coaching career (HC unless noted)
- 1972–1981: Wilmington HS (DE)
- 1982–1984: Cheyney (AHC/DB)
- 1985–1989: Cheyney
- 1990–1991: Virginia Union (DC)
- 1992–1996: Hampton (DC)
- 1998–2001: Elizabeth City State (DC)
- 2002–2014: St. Augustine's
- 2015–2017: Christopher Newport (LB)
- 2018–2020: Christopher Newport (ST/LB)

Head coaching record
- Overall: 41–104

Michael E. Costa (born c. 1948) is an American former college football coach. Costa served as the head football coach at Cheyney University of Pennsylvania from 1985 to 1989 and St. Augustine's University in Raleigh, North Carolina from 2002 through the first game of the 2014 season.

Costa graduated from Flushing High School in Flushing, Queens and then played college football as a defensive back at Prairie View A&M University in Prairie View, Texas. He transferred to Norfolk State University in Norfolk, Virginia, from which he graduated in 1971. In 1981, Costa received a master's degree in health and physical education from West Chester University 1981 in West Chester, Pennsylvania.

Costa began his coaching career at Wilmington High School in Wilmington, Delaware, where was an assistant football coach from 1972 and 1981 and also coached basketball, track, and swimming. He moved to the college level in 1982 as an assistant football coach at Cheyney under Andy Hinson. As assistant head coach and defensive back coach, he mentored Andre Waters, who went on to play in the National Football League (NFL). Costa succeeded Hinson as Cheyney's head football coach in 1985. He finished his coaching career as an assistant with Christopher Newport.

== Head coaching record ==
Year	Team	Overall	Conference	Standing	Bowl/playoffs
Cheyney Wolves (Pennsylvania State Athletic Conference) (1985–1989)
1985	Cheyney	1–9	1–5	T–6th (Eastern)	
1986	Cheyney	2–8	1–5	T–5th (Eastern)	
1987	Cheyney	2–8	0–6	7th (Eastern)	
1988	Cheyney	2–8	1–5	6th (Eastern)	
1989	Cheyney	3–8	3–3	4th (Eastern)	
Cheyney:		10–41	6–24		
St. Augustine's Falcons (Central Intercollegiate Athletic Association) (2002–2014)
2002	St. Augustine's	0–8	0–7	6th (Western)	
2003	St. Augustine's	0–5 (Note: In October 2008, St. Augustine's was penalized by the NCAA for "a lack of institutional control and other major violations". The program was forced to vacate all wins from the 2003 though 2007 seasons: 5 wins in 2003, 4 wins in 2004, 8 wins in 2005, 4 wins in 2006, and 2 wins in 2007.)	0–4	6th (Western)	
2004	St. Augustine's	0–4			
2005	St. Augustine's	0–2	0–2	6th (Western)	
2006	St. Augustine's	0–5	0–3	5th (Western)	
2007	St. Augustine's	0–8	0–5	5th (Western)	
2008	St. Augustine's	4–6	3–4	3rd (Western)	
2009	St. Augustine's	4–6	4–3	3rd (Western)	
2010	St. Augustine's	9–2	6–1	2nd (Southern)	
2011	St. Augustine's	4–6	3–4	T–4th (Southern)	
2012	St. Augustine's	6–4	4–3	3rd (Southern)	
2013	St. Augustine's	4–6	3–4	4th (Southern)	
2014	St. Augustine's	0–1 (Note: Costa was fired after the first game of the 2014 season, a non-conference loss. Michael Morand was named to succeed him and led St. Augustine's to a record of 3–6 over the final nine games of the season. The team compiled 3–4 mark in conference play, placing third in the Southern Division of the Central Intercollegiate Athletic Association)	0–0		
St. Augustine's:		31–63	23–41		
Total:		41–104			
