= Queens Historical Society =

Nonprofit history organization in Queens, New York City

Coordinates: 40°45′48.97″N 73°49′26.83″W

- Abbreviation: QHS
- Predecessor: Kingsland Preservation Committee
- Formation: 1968
- Type: Not-for-profit organization
- Headquarters: 143-35 37th Ave, Flushing, Queens, New York City, 11354
- Website: www.queenshistoricalsociety.org

The Queens Historical Society, which was founded in 1968 by Margaret I. Carman after a merger with the Kingsland Preservation Commission, is dedicated to preserving the history and cultural heritage of Queens, New York and interpreting the history of the borough as it relates to various historical periods. The historical society is the only museum about Queens' history within the borough and is located in Kingsland Homestead, which is a historic house museum within Weeping Beech Park.

Among the historical society's main projects is assisting in the historic preservation and designation of the borough's landmarks, the preservation of the Brinckerhoff Family Cemetery, as well as several other cemeteries in the borough.

== See also ==
- List of historical societies in New York (state)
