= Louis Berger & Co. =

Defunct New York architectural firm

Louis Berger & Co. was an architectural firm in Queens, New York active between 1895 and 1930. It was a major local architect of Ridgewood, Queens.

The firm designed most of Ridgewood's row houses and tenement buildings, over 5,000 in number. It also designed Ridgewood's "only extant freestanding mansion", at 66-75 Forest Ave., which was built in 1906, and the Ridgewood National Bank building, later Manufacturers Hanover Trust Bank. Louis Berger was first president of the Ridgewood National Bank.

Berger or the firm designed multiple projects that are listed on the U.S. National Register of Historic Places either individually or as whole or part of a historic district.

== Louis Berger ==
Louis Berger was born in Rheinpfalz, Germany in 1875, immigrated to the U.S. in 1880, and came to Ridgewood in 1892. He studied architecture at the Pratt Institute. He apprenticed with the prestigious architectural firm Carrere and Hastings. He opened his firm in Ridgewood in 1895.

== Works ==
Works (with attribution) include:

- Ridgewood National Bank
- One or more buildings in 68th Avenue-64th Place Historic District, roughly 64th Pl. from Catalpa Ave. to 68th Ave. from 64th St. to 65th St. New York, NY (Berger, Louis), NRHP-listed
- One or more buildings in 75th Avenue-61st Street Historic District, Roughly bounded by St. Felix Ave., 60th Lane, 60th and 62nd Sts. New York, NY (Berger, Louis, & Co.), NRHP-listed
- One or more buildings in Central Ridgewood Historic District, Roughly bounded by Fresh Pond Rd., Putnam, 68th, Forest, Catalpa, Onderdonk, and 71st Aves. New York, NY (Berger, Louis, & Co.), NRHP-listed
- Cooper Avenue Row Historic District, a row house development at 6434-6446 Cooper Ave. New York, NY (Berger, Louis, & Co.), NRHP-listed
- One or more buildings in Cornelia-Putnam Historic District, roughly bounded by Jefferson St., Putnam, Wyckoff, and Myrtle Aves. New York, NY (Berger, Louis, & Co.), NRHP-listed
- One or more buildings in Cypress Avenue East Historic District, roughly bounded by Linden and Cornelia Sts., Seneca and St. Nicholas Aves. New York, NY (Berger, Louis), NRHP-listed
- One or more buildings in Cypress Avenue West Historic District, roughly bounded by St. Nicholas and Seneca Aves., Linden and Stockholm Sts. New York, NY (Berger, Louis, & Co.), NRHP-listed
- One or more buildings in Cypress Avenue West Historic District, roughly bounded by St. Nicholas and Seneca Aves., Linden and Stockholm Sts. New York, NY (Berger, Louis, & Co.), NRHP-listed
- One or more buildings in Forest-Norman Historic District, Forest Ave. from Summerfield to Stephen St. and Norman St. to Myrtle Ave. New York, NY (Berger, Louis), NRHP-listed
- One or more buildings in Fresh Pond-Traffic Historic District, roughly bounded by Fresh Pond Rd., Traffic Ave., Woodbine and Linden Sts. New York, NY (Berger, Louis), NRHP-listed
- One or more buildings in Grove-Linden-St. John's Historic District, Fairview Ave., St. John's Rd., Linden and Grove Sts. New York, NY (Berger, Louis, & Co.), NRHP-listed
- One or more buildings in Madison-Putnam-60th Place Historic District, roughly bounded by Woodbine St., 60th Pl., 67th and Forest Aves. New York, NY (Berger, Louis, & Co.), NRHP-listed
- One or more buildings in Summerfield Street Row Historic District, 5912-5948 Summerfield St. New York, NY (Berger, Louis, & Co.), NRHP-listed
