= Nils Granlund =

American show producer and businessman

Nils Thor Granlund

Nils T. Granlund (September 29, 1890–April 21, 1957) was an American show producer, entertainment industry entrepreneur and radio industry pioneer. He was a publicist for Marcus Loew who formed Loews Theatres and Metro-Goldwyn-Mayer (MGM). He developed the first film trailers. Although his birth name was Nils Theodore Granlund, he later used Thor as a middle name, and after appearing on early radio was commonly referenced only by his initials, N.T.G., on the air and in print.

== Early life ==
Granlund was born in Ljungby Parish in the province of Småland, Sweden. His father was Teodor Granlund, born during 1857 in Fridlevstad in the province of Blekinge. His mother Amanda (Bylund) Granlund (1858-1912) was born in Tingsås Parish, province of Småland. (Source: Swedish Census of 1890). His grandfather Nils-Fredrik Bylund (born 29 oct 1829) had a brewery in the Swedish village of Skruf, Bylunds bryggeri. Granlund emigrated with his family to the United States as second cabin class passengers on the board the S/S Amerika at Copenhagen, Denmark; it arrived at the Port of New York on July 2, 1894. The family settled in Providence, Rhode Island. While still in his teen years he began covering the yachting news for the Providence Tribune, where he later become sports editor, and covered the local entertainment news. By his 18th year he had been an automobile race driver, aviator and press agent. His promotional efforts for a local theater caught the attention of Marcus Loew who hired Granlund in 1913 as a publicity agent for Hanky Panky, a recently acquired touring vaudeville show.

== Marcus Loew Theaters ==
Following the year-long tour, Loew promoted Granlund to oversee marketing for his theater chain as publicity manager. In addition to publicizing events at the various venues, at the urging of Loew, Granlund began staging live talent revues at several of the under performing theaters. His innovative techniques resulted in the first use of film for promoting live theater and the first filmed trailers for upcoming movies. In 1922 Granlund visited the studios of WHN, a part-time broadcasting station in Ridgewood, Queens, New York, and after a series of experimental programs, he convinced Loew to lease the station as a promotional arm of Loew's Theaters. He had conceived the elaborate movie premiere, with lights, news cameras and personal appearances of stars. He exploited and advertised the first full-length motion picture in the United States.

== Early radio ==
After several months of live programming as an anonymous announcer known only by his initials, N.T.G., Granlund approached George Schubel, President of the Ridgewood Times and licensee of WHN, proposing to purchase the station and relocating it to New York City. On July 28, 1923, the station was purchased by Marcus Loew and the studios transferred to his State Theatre at 1540 Broadway, where Granlund served as Station Manager and announcer. He brought entertainers Al Jolson, Eddie Cantor and Harry Richman to the listening public. He also presented radio's first amateur program.

== Prohibition ==
Granlund continued to stage live revues for the Loew's Theaters and became known for his use of scantily-clad chorus girls, comedians, and singers. As a producer, he simultaneously staged shows at Broadway showplaces such as the Frivolity Club, the Silver Slipper, the Paradise, and the Hollywood. During Prohibition he was arrested along with several other speakeasy figures, including Texas Guinan, whom Granlund had introduced to Larry Fay, her partner at the notorious El Fey Club. The sweep was part of a city-wide liquor crackdown that made headlines across the United States. Although Granlund was charged in the initial indictment, following Guinan's acquittal, prosecutors declined to press the case against Granlund.

== Nightclub ownership ==
September 15, 1938, after operating successful reviews on Broadway and touring the U.S., Granlund opened his first nightclub as sole owner. The Midnight Sun featured a Swedish motif and relied on the sales of food over liquor, but offered the same live stage presentations. In a syndicated column describing his innovations in the New York Times, Granlund is credited with having invented the modern nightclub. His Hollywood Restaurant on Broadway set all-time night club entertainment standards. The famed Paradise Restaurant in New York City was also his creation.

== Hollywood ==
His Congress of Beauty exhibition at the 1939 New York World's Fair met with mixed reviews and financial disaster, forcing Granlund to shut down the showgirl revue early. Within a year, he relocated to California, setting up a chorus line revue at Hollywood's Florentine Gardens, an act generally panned by Variety, but one which during World War II, held great appeal to California-based servicemen, and boosted Granlund into the ranks of the nation's top grossing entertainment acts. While in Hollywood, he was featured in several motion pictures, generally appearing as himself, and 1942's Rhythm Parade was set at the Florentine Gardens.

== Later years ==
After seven years in Hollywood, Granlund made an unsuccessful return to New York City, staging his familiar shows that were increasing panned by critics as throwbacks to vaudeville. His shows at the Frivolity, The Greenwich Village Inn, and the Rio Cabana were savaged by Variety critics.

Returning to California, he staged revues for several West Coast nightclubs, and briefly hosted a radio talk show as well as a televised amateur variety production on KTSL, a short-lived program called Backstage with NTG. Actress Elinor Donahue has related how he helped out both her and her mother with much needed groceries, when she appeared on this show during a very lean time in her career.

The publication of his memoir, Blondes, Brunettes, and Bullets briefly resurrected his name from the obscurity into which he had fallen, and four weeks after its release, Granlund was in Las Vegas negotiating a chorus line production contract when his taxi was struck leaving the Riviera Hotel and Casino. He died of head injuries on April 21, 1957 at age 66. Funeral arrangements were made by actress Yvonne De Carlo, whom Granlund had hired as a dancer at the Florentine Gardens, one of the multitude of stars who owed their first break in show business to Granlund.

== Related reading ==
- Jaker, Bill et al. (2008) Airwaves of New York: Illustrated Histories of 156 Am Stations in the Metropolitan Area, 1921-1996 (McFarland and Company) ISBN 978-0786438723
- Peretti, Burton W. (2013) Nightclub City: Politics and Amusement in Manhattan (University of Pennsylvania Press) ISBN 9780812203363
- Zemeckis, Leslie (2014) Behind the Burly Q: The Story of Burlesque in America (Skyhorse Publishing, Inc.) ISBN 9781629148687
