= Cypress Avenue =

Cypress Avenue may refer to:

- Cypress Avenue (GoldLinQ station), a light rail station in Queensland, Australia
- Cypress Avenue (IRT Pelham Line), a station on the New York City Subway
- Cypress Avenue East Historic District, Ridgewood, Queens, New York
- Cypress Avenue West Historic District, Ridgewood, Queens, New York

== See also ==
- "Cyprus Avenue", a 1968 song by Van Morrison about a street in Belfast
- Cyprus Avenue (play), a 2016 play by David Ireland
