= Wyckoff Heights, New York City =

Neighborhood in Brooklyn and Queens

Coordinates: 40.703°N 73.919°W

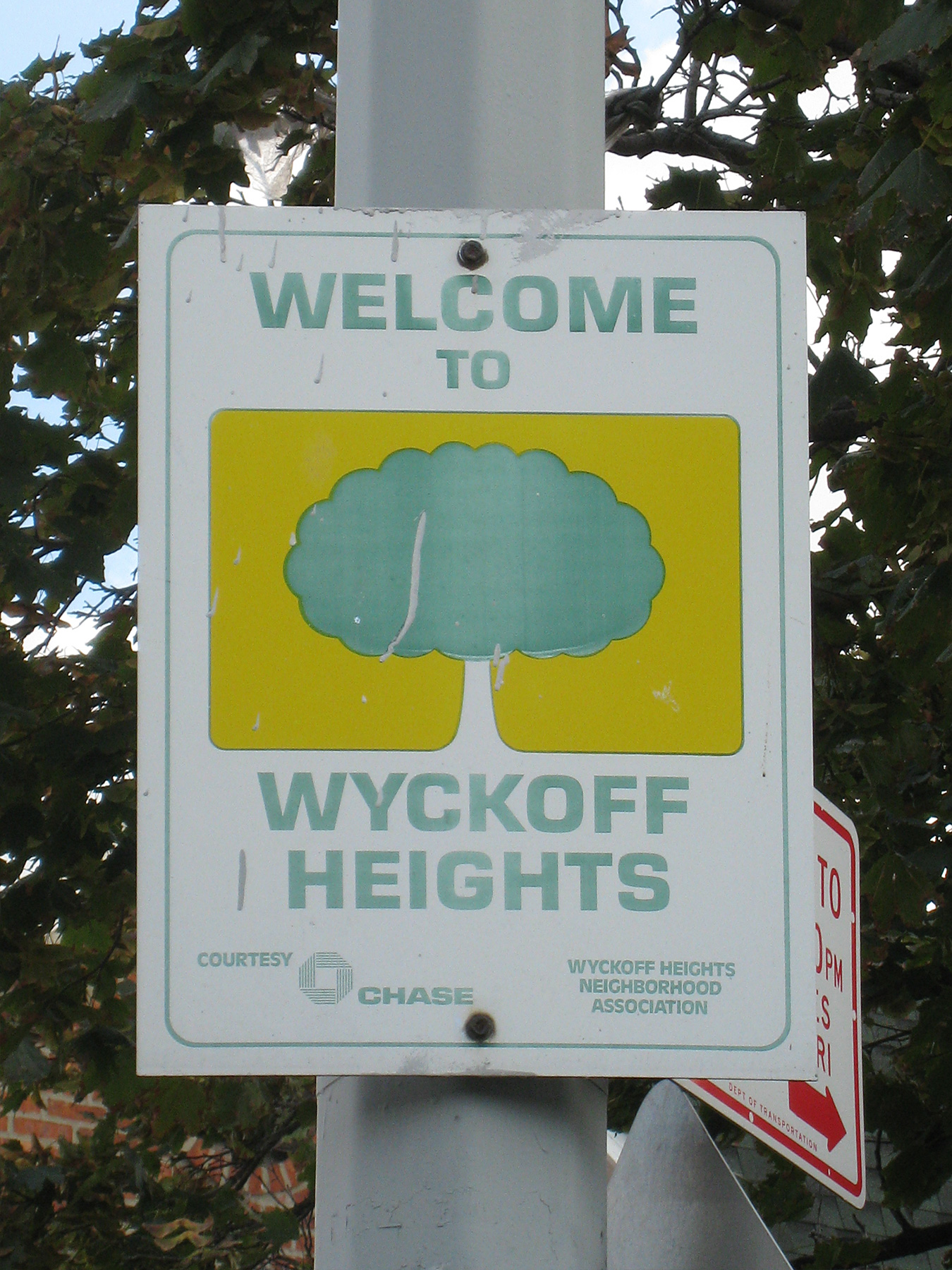
Sign in Wyckoff Heights welcoming visitors.

Wyckoff Heights is an area within the New York City boroughs of Brooklyn and Queens, straddling the border between Bushwick, Brooklyn, and southwest Ridgewood, Queens. Wyckoff Heights was urbanized starting in the late 19th century, and took its name from the Wyckoff family, who owned the land. The area was home first to many German immigrants, later followed by Italian and more recently Latino and Eastern-European residents.

Wyckoff Heights is located largely within ZIP Codes 11237 and 11385. Points of interest include Wyckoff Heights Medical Center and the former Wyckoff Heights Presbyterian Church.

== History ==
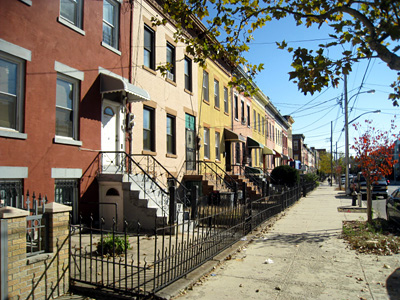
Rowhouses on St. Nicholas Avenue

Wyckoff Heights was urbanized starting in the late 19th century, and took its name from the Wyckoff family who owned and farmed much of the land. Development progressed from Brooklyn into Queens as portions of the Wyckoff farm were sold. In 1890, newspapers announced the creation of a new park (now Maria Hernandez Park) to be located in Wyckoff Heights, within the 18th Ward of Brooklyn. In 1892, Queens County property owners established the Wyckoff Heights Improvement Association to lobby for water, sewer, and gas service to the neighborhood, and the next year, the Wyckoff Heights Water Company was formed to supply drinking water to the area. In 1901 residents of the Queens section lobbied the City government to "adopt a system of house numbering" and erect street signs so that the postal service would begin delivery to the neighborhood. The last 18 acres (73,000 m^{2}) of farmland were developed in the 1940s.

=== ZIP Codes ===
Initially, mail delivery to the Queens section was provided by the Brooklyn Post Office. The Wyckoff Heights Post Office (ZIP Code 11237) at 86 Wyckoff Avenue was opened in 1951, serving north Bushwick and the Brooklyn portion of Wyckoff Heights. When ZIP Codes were assigned in 1963, all areas whose mail was routed through a Brooklyn post office were given the 112 prefix. The neighboring areas of Glendale and Ridgewood in Queens were given a Brooklyn mailing address, 11227, shared with Bushwick and Wyckoff Heights. In addition, parts of Bushwick and Wyckoff Heights were in ZIP Code 11237. After the 1977 New York City blackout, newspapers around the country published UPI and Associated Press' photos of Bushwick residents with stolen items and a police officer beating a suspected looter, and Bushwick became known for riots and looting. After the 1977 blackout, the communities of Ridgewood and Glendale expressed a desire to disassociate themselves from Bushwick.

Following complaints from residents, Postmaster General William Bolger proposed that the ZIP Codes would be changed if United States Representative Geraldine Ferraro could produce evidence that 70% of residents supported it. After Ferraro's office distributed ballots to residents, 93 percent of the returned ballots voted for the change. The change of the Queens side to ZIP Code 11385 was made effective January 13, 1980. 11237 was reassigned to cover only Bushwick and Wyckoff Heights, and 11227 was eliminated.

== Land use ==
=== Residential ===
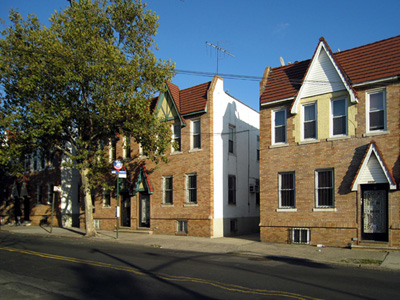
Semi-attached houses on DeKalb Avenue

The first buildings constructed in the neighborhood were largely attached wood frame three- and six-family row houses.

Around the turn of the century, as urbanization moved northeast towards the borough line and into Queens, developers switched to masonry construction in order to conform to new building and fire codes. Many of these buildings are now part of the Cypress Avenue West Historic District.

In the 1940s the last large-scale development in the neighborhood saw the construction of more automobile-oriented attached single-family homes with alleys and garages in the rear.

=== Points of interest ===
Wyckoff Heights is home to the Wyckoff Heights Medical Center at Wyckoff Avenue and Stockholm Street (originally the German Hospital of Brooklyn, renamed in 1918), and the former Wyckoff Heights Presbyterian Church at Harman Street and St. Nicholas Avenue (founded in 1895 and rebuilt after a 1928 fire, now the Ridgewood Pentecostal Church).
