= List of New York State Historic Markers in Queens County, New York =

This is a complete list of New York State Historic Markers in Queens County, New York.

== Listings county-wide ==
	Marker name	Image	Date designated	Location	City or Town	Marker text
1	Arbitration Rock			Maspeth, on Onderdok Ave. north of Flushing Ave. Maspeth.	Maspeth, New York	Arbitration rock is under this point. It marks the settlement, in 1769, of a boundary line dispute between the Towns of Newton and Bushwick.
2	Betty Smith 1943			Woodhaven, Forest Parkway.	Woodhaven, New York	Betty lived here while she wrote "A Tree Grows in Bklyn." The movie won an academy award in 1945. The house has been restored by R. Leonardi. Woodhaven Cultural and Historical Society. HMDB 133502
3	Cadwallader Colden House			Flushing, Horace Harding Blvd., East of Rodman St.	Flushing, New York	Built 1762. Stood opposite. He was Lieutenant Governor of the Province of New York 1760 to 1775. He died here on September 28, 1776.
4	Dewitt Clinton House			Maspeth, 58th St. Near 56th Road.	Maspeth, New York	Dweitt Clinton House 1790-1828. Stood several hundred feet north of here. Gov. Dewitt Clinton worked on plans for Erie Canal here.
5	First House Number in Queens			Woodhaven, near Park Lane South and 85th Street	Woodhaven, New York	First House Number in Queens, on house opposite here, under numerical street & house number system started 1913 by Topographical Bureau G. U. Powell, engineer in charge.
6	Foster House			Alley Pond, on Douglaston Parkway just east of Alley Pond.	Douglaston, New York	Foster House stood opposite. Stone part used during Indian attacks. Thomas Foster was hanged by Hessians; his son rescued him.
7	Francis Lewis			Whitestone, 7th Ave. and Clintonville Street	Whitestone, New York	Here was the estate of Francis Lewis, signer of Declaration of Independence. His home stood several hundred feet east of here.
8	Gen. Howe's Headquarters			Newtown, Queens Blvd. at 57th Ave. Elmhurst	Elmhurst, New York	Gen. Howe's Headquarters stands opposite here. Howe wrote his report of the Battle of Long Island here Sept. 3, 1776. Was Renne home.
9	Jackson's Mill			Jackson Heights, this mill stood about at the crossing of Grand Central Park	Jackson Heights, New York	Here stood Wessel's Grist Mill, 1640. Razed in early Indian War, later milles of Loyster, Kip, Fish and Jackson used the same site.
10	Moore Homestead			Elmhurst, 45th Ave. at Broadway.	Jackson Heights, New York	Moore Homestead, 1662. Ancestral home of Dr. C.O. Moore, author of "Twas the Night Before Christmas". Later the home of grandson Commodore O.H. Perry.
11	Gen. Nathaniel Woodhull			Hollis, at southeast corner Jamaica Ave. and 196th St.	Jackson Heights, New York	Gen. Nathaniel Woodhull was captured and fatally wounded by the British in Increase Carpenter's House 200 feet north of this spot.
12	Prince Homestead			Flushing, on Northern Blvd. bet. Lawrence St. & Collins Pl.	Flushing, New York	Prince Homestead stands opposite. Built by E. Embree 1780. Washington stopped here to see the Prince Nurseries during his trip to Long Island 1789.
13	Prospect Cemetery			Jamaica, 159th St., south of Beaver Road.	Jamaica, New York	Original Jamaica Town Burying Ground, established 1660. Egbert Benson born 1746, died 1833, buried here. First Attorney General N.Y. State.
14	Quaker Meeting House			Flushing, 137-16 Northern Blvd.	Flushing, New York	Easterly part built 1694. Remainder built 1717. Always used for worship except 1776-83 when occupied by British as prison, hospital and stable.
15	Rapelye's Mill			Corona, this mill stood on Colonial Ave., opposite Waldron St.	Corona, New York	On this site, 1655, Captain John Coe erected the first grist mill in Newtown, used as a mill by Rapelye until 1875.
16	Remsen Cemetery			Forest Hill, just north of Metropolitan Ave. bet. Orville St. and Trotting.	Forest Hills, New York	Col. Jeromus Remsen, 1735-1790, is buried here. Was colonel of a regiment of Kings and Queens Co. militia in the Battle of Long Island.
17	Stevens House			L.I. City, 30th Road East of Vernon Blvd., Astoria.	Astoria, New York	Major General Ebenezer Stevens Home east of here. Born 1752; took part in Boston Tea Party; major of artillery in the Revolutionary War.
18	Walter Bowne			Flushing, east side of 155th St. midway bet. 33rd Ave. & 35th Ave.	Flushing, New York	Site of his residence. Mayor N.Y. City 1829-33. Great great grandson of John Bowne, one of the original patentees of Flushing.
19	Woodhaven Library			Woodhaven, northeast corner of Forest Pkwy. & 85th Dr.	Woodhaven, Queens	The last public library to be built with Carnegie money. Cornerstone set June 28, 1923 by Mayor Hyland. Opened January 7, 1924.

== See also ==
- List of New York State Historic Markers
- National Register of Historic Places listings in New York
- List of National Historic Landmarks in New York
