= Seneca Avenue East Historic District =

Historic district in Queens, New York

- U.S. National Register of Historic Places
- U.S. Historic district
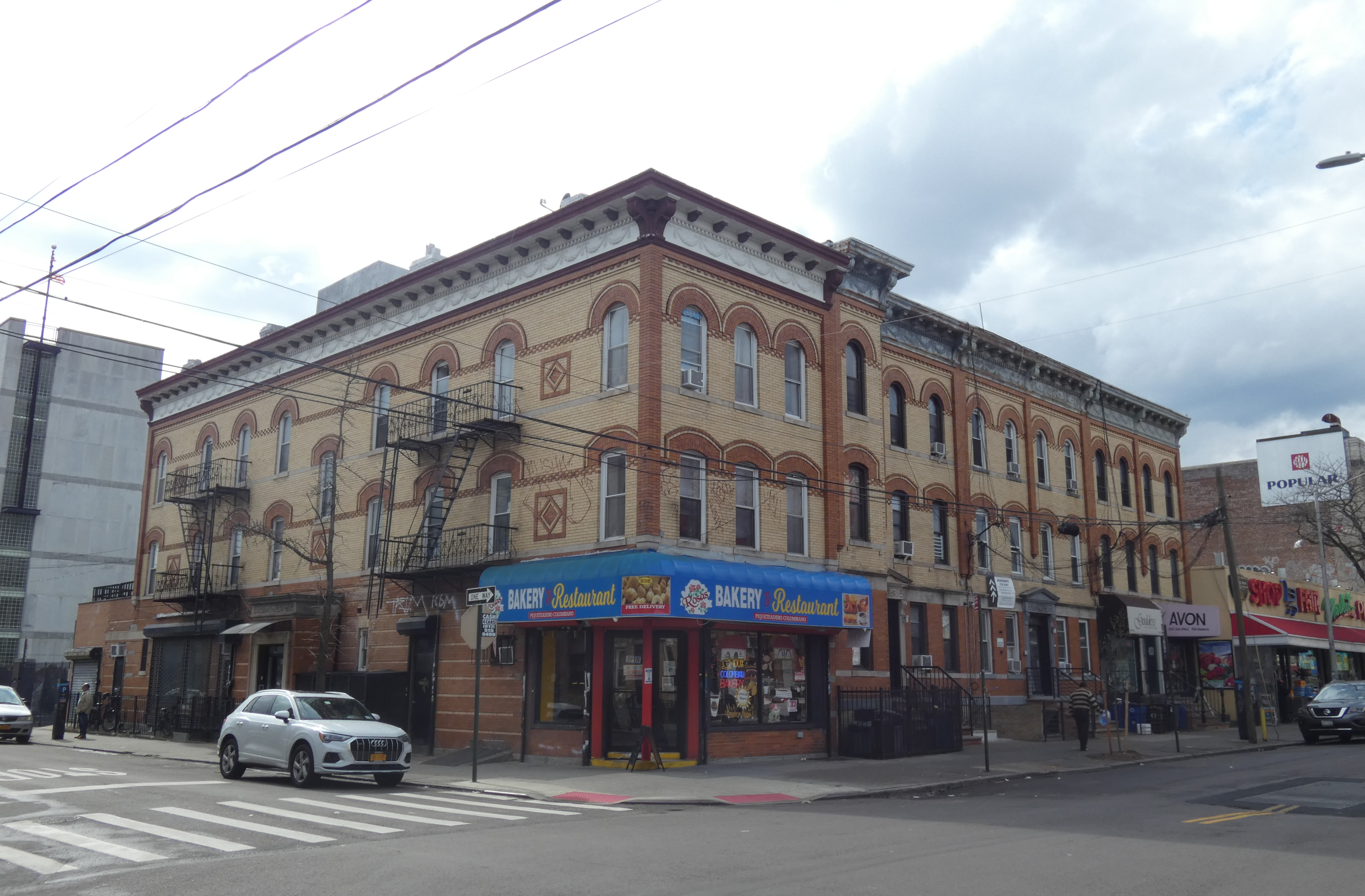
- A block in the historic district

- Location within New York City Location within New York Location within the United States
- Location: Roughly Seneca Ave. E. between Hancock and Summerfield Sts., New York, New York
- Coordinates: 40°41′59″N 73°54′7″W
- Area: 8.5 acres (3.4 ha)
- Built: 1905
- Architectural style: Renaissance, Romanesque
- MPS: Ridgewood MRA
- NRHP reference No.: 83001778
- Added to NRHP: September 30, 1983

Seneca Avenue East Historic District is a national historic district in Ridgewood, Queens, New York. It includes 120 contributing buildings built between 1900 and 1915. They consist mainly of brick two-story row houses with one apartment per floor and three-story tenements with two apartments per floor. They feature speckled brick facades in various shades of yellow, amber, burnt orange, brown, and cream.

It was listed on the National Register of Historic Places in 1983.
