= Ridgewood, Queens =

Neighborhood in New York City

Ridgewood
- Neighborhood of Queens
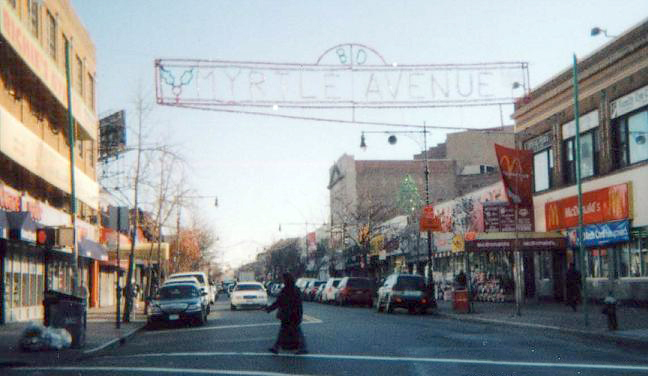
- Myrtle Avenue's Business Improvement District runs from Wyckoff Avenue to Fresh Pond Road in Ridgewood where the elevated Bay Ridge Branch of the LIRR crosses over Myrtle Avenue and serves as a border between Ridgewood and the neighboring "lower" portion of Glendale.
- Location within New York City
- Coordinates: 40°42′17″N 73°54′07″W
- Country: United States
- State: New York
- City: New York City
- County/Borough: Queens
- Community District: Queens 5

Population (2010)
  - Total: 69,317

Ethnicity
  - Hispanic: 49.0%
  - White: 39.8%
  - Asian: 7.7%
  - Black: 2.0%
  - Other/Multiracial: 1.5%

Economics
  - Median income: $42,049
- Time zone: UTC−05:00 (EST)
  - Summer (DST): UTC−04:00 (EDT)
- ZIP Code: 11385
- Area codes: 718, 347, 929, and 917

Ridgewood is a neighborhood in the New York City borough of Queens. It borders the Queens neighborhoods of Maspeth to the north, Middle Village to the east, and Glendale to the southeast, as well as the Brooklyn neighborhoods of Bushwick to the southwest and East Williamsburg to the west. Historically, the neighborhood straddled the Queens-Brooklyn boundary.

The etymology of Ridgewood's name is disputed, but it may have referred to Ridgewood Reservoir, the local geography, or a road. The British settled Ridgewood in the 17th century, while the Dutch settled nearby Bushwick. The adjacent settlements led to decades of disputes over the boundary, which later became the border between Queens and Brooklyn. Bushwick was developed rapidly in the 19th century, but Ridgewood remained sparsely populated until the early 20th century, when rowhouses were built for its rapidly growing, predominantly German population. Ridgewood has become more ethnically diverse since the mid-20th century. Large parts of the neighborhood are national and city historic districts.

Ridgewood is patrolled by the New York City Police Department's 104th Precinct. It is represented by the New York City Council's 30th District.

== Etymology ==
The origin of the neighborhood's name is disputed. One theory is that it came from the Ridgewood Reservoir in Highland Park, in Brooklyn just south of Ridgewood. The reservoir was on a high ridge in the middle of the Harbor Hill Moraine, a terminal moraine that runs the length of Long Island. Another possible etymology is the forests that covered the area before colonial settlement, and that early English settlers called the moraine the "ridge" of Long Island. Yet another possible etymology is "Ridge Road".

The name was originally applied by the government of Kings County (now coextensive with Brooklyn), and referred to an area within Brooklyn along the border between Kings and Queens Counties. In the early 20th century, developers gave the area various names, including Germania Heights, St. James Park, Ridgewood Heights, Wyckoff Heights, and Knickerbocker Heights, but only "Ridgewood" gained enough popularity past the 1910s.

== History ==
=== Early settlement ===
Ridgewood is adjacent to Bushwick, Brooklyn, and the two neighborhoods have similar histories. According to The New York Times, "Ridgewood and Bushwick used to be merged into one amorphous mass. There was even a Ridgewood, Brooklyn (which is now in Bushwick)", initially settled by the Lenape Native Americans, specifically the Mespachtes tribe (for whom the adjacent neighborhood of Maspeth is named).

In 1638, the Dutch West India Company secured a deed from the Lenape; subsequently, Peter Stuyvesant chartered present-day Bushwick in 1661 under the name Boswijck, meaning "neighborhood in the woods" in 17th-century Dutch. Likewise, Ridgewood was part of Newtown, one of the three initial towns in Queens, and was settled by the British.

In both neighborhoods, British and Dutch families tilled farms and grew crops for Brooklyn's and Manhattan's markets. Many of these farms also had slaves. The only known remaining Dutch farmhouse in the neighborhood is the Onderdonk House, which was erected in 1709. Also at the Onderdonk House site is Arbitration Rock, a marker for the disputed boundary between Bushwick and Newtown, and by extension Brooklyn and Queens (see § Border with Bushwick). The land remained rural through the American Revolutionary War, though there may have been a burial ground in the area. Ridgewood's oldest streets are Myrtle Avenue, Metropolitan Avenue, and Fresh Pond Road, which were used by farmers to take their goods to markets. Fresh Pond Road was formerly a Native American trail; the other roads were laid out as plank roads in the early to mid-19th century.

=== 19th-century development ===
The development of public transportation, starting with horse-drawn cars in the mid-19th century and later succeeded by trolleys and elevated trains, helped to spur residential and retail development. The first transit line to arrive in the neighborhood was the Myrtle Avenue horsecar, which was extended to Brooklyn's Broadway in 1855. Following this, the Bay Ridge Branch opened in 1878, connecting to Sheepshead Bay, Manhattan Beach, and the Brooklyn shorefront via the Manhattan Beach Railroad. The Myrtle Avenue elevated railroad, running above Myrtle Avenue within Brooklyn, was extended to the Queens border in 1889. An electric trolley line through Ridgewood, running to Lutheran Cemetery, was opened along a private right-of-way in 1894. Ten years later, the Myrtle Avenue Elevated was extended on a ground level alignment over that trolley line. The current elevated structure would be erected along the Lutheran Cemetery line's right-of-way in 1915.

Simultaneously, northern Brooklyn was seeing an increase in the number of German immigrants. Many of the city's German immigrants had originally settled in Manhattan's Little Germany, located mostly within the East Village and Lower East Side, in the mid-19th century. By the late 19th and early 20th centuries, German immigrants had moved to other enclaves such as Yorkville, Manhattan; Steinway, Queens; and the north Brooklyn/Ridgewood area. The discovery of freshwater under northern Brooklyn resulted in the development of breweries, where many Germans worked. By 1880, there were 35 breweries in Brooklyn, including a 14-block "brewer's row" within Bushwick that contained at least 11 breweries. Factories and knitting mills were also opened within the communities, and speculative German developers built houses, consisting mostly of multi-family stock that were three or four stories tall. "Brewer's Row" had grown to 14 breweries by 1890.

=== 20th-century development ===
==== Residential construction ====
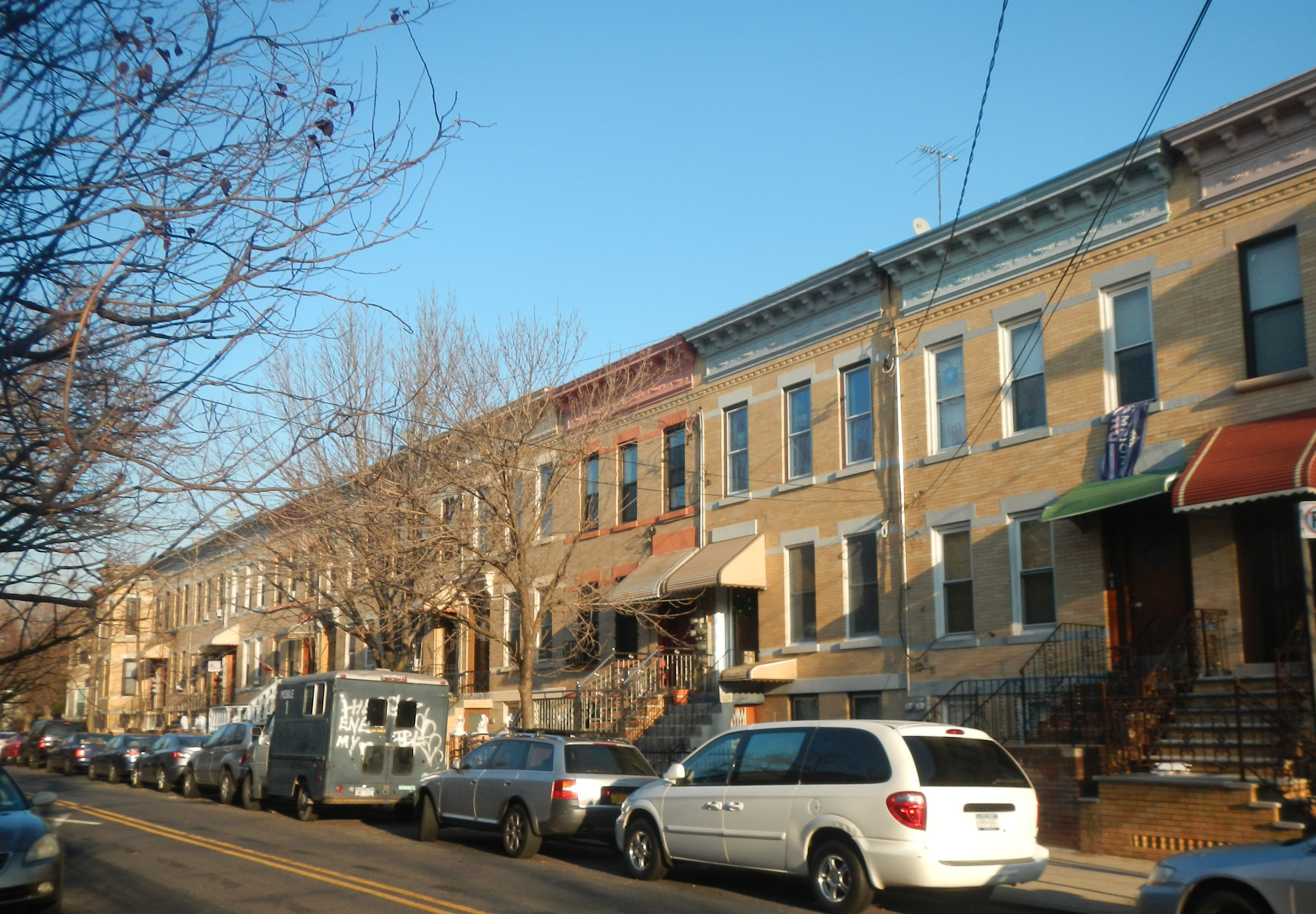
One of the rowhouse developments in Ridgewood, preserved as part of the Stockholm–DeKalb–Hart Historic District

Ridgewood remained rural until the unification of New York City's boroughs in 1898, even as Bushwick had become fully developed. Development in Ridgewood in the 19th century consisted mostly of picnicking locations, beer gardens, racetracks, and amusement areas for the residents of Bushwick. By the end of the century, developers had bought these sites and started constructing rowhouses and tenements, usually two to three stories high. The Ridgewood Board of Trade, created in 1902, was organized to develop the streets and utilities, and to improve the transit infrastructure.

Much of the housing stock was erected between 1905 and 1915. Most of the houses built before 1905 were wood-frame houses; that year, a zoning ordinance was passed, requiring new buildings to be made of masonry. The area was developed more quickly after the Queensboro Bridge opened in 1909, connecting Queens to Manhattan. According to a 1909 issue of the Real Estate Record and Guide, development was concentrated in a 150-block area around East Williamsburg in Brooklyn, namely the present-day area of Ridgewood. More than five thousand buildings were built from the beginning of the 20th century to World War I's start in the mid-1910s. Residential construction predominated in the southern part of Ridgewood while industrial factories and mills were prevalent in the northern section, near Newtown Creek.

Construction slowed down during World War I, but resumed shortly after the war's end, and by the 1930s the last farmland in Ridgewood had been developed. Some of the later houses were single-family homes with garages. Two of the more drastic changes to Ridgewood's character in the 1920s were the implementation of a street numbering system across Queens in 1925, followed by the opening of the Canarsie subway on the neighborhood's southern border in 1928.

==== Ethnic changes ====
Ridgewood was among New York City's most quickly-developing neighborhoods between at least 1906 and 1911. Much of the new housing was originally settled by Germans, who had mostly moved from other neighborhoods such as Williamsburg. To the German newcomers, the modern and more expansive houses in Ridgewood provided an improvement over the cramped housing stock in their former neighborhoods. A 1913 Real Estate Record article stated that, for several years, Germans had been moving to Ridgewood from the city's other boroughs. Figures from the 1910 United States census indicated that much of Ridgewood's population was working-class and of German or Eastern European descent, and many homes were owner-occupied. Ridgewood's German population was so large that the Ridgewood Times' first issue in 1908 was published in both English and German.

After World War I, the population expanded with an influx of Gottscheers, an ethnic German population from Slovenia who were dislocated in the aftermath of World War I, and spoke the Gottscheerish dialect. Other Eastern Europeans came as well. As recorded in the 1920 United States census, the population of Ridgewood was mostly working-class homeowners from Germany, Austria, or Italy, with a smaller population from Hungary, Ireland, Poland, and Sweden. The demographic figures remained relatively unchanged through the 1930 United States census. The large German presence led to disputes following the rise of Nazi Germany, and a large, 9,000-person boycott of Nazi Germany in April 1934 resulted in brawls between Nazi sympathizers and about 200 Communists, members of the Anti-Fascist League of Brooklyn, as well as several hundred members of the Blue Shirt Minutemen of Brownsville and members of the Jewish War Veterans League. Still, in the 1939 WPA Guide to New York City, workers for the Federal Writers' Project described Ridgewood and Bushwick as "old-fashioned and respectable", and said that Ridgewood "rivals Manhattan's Yorkville as a German center."

By the 1940 United States census, Southern Europeans were also recorded as having moved into Ridgewood. In the mid-20th century, Romanians, Serbs, and Puerto Ricans arrived. By the late 20th century, Poles, Dominicans, and Ecuadorians—including a significant population of Quechua-speaking Amerindians from the Imbabura and Cañar provinces of Ecuador—had moved to Ridgewood. Other large populations included Yugoslavians, Chinese, Koreans, and Slovenians.

Ridgewood, Glendale, and neighboring Middlevillage are all home to a large Serbian community with several businesses being located on Forest avenue, There is the Serbian-Romanian Banatul Organization and on Cooper avenue there is the Serbian Association of New York which was founded in 1992, the association also hosts a soccer team.

=== Late 20th century ===
Originally, "Ridgewood and Bushwick used to be merged into one amorphous mass. There was even a Ridgewood, Brooklyn (which is now in Bushwick)" and they all shared ZIP Code 11237. Following the 1977 blackout, the two communities petitioned for a separate ZIP code to distance themselves from the blight and crime issues affecting Bushwick and other areas of Brooklyn. Residents voted on a proposal to create a new ZIP Code, and a majority of votes were cast in favor of the proposal. The communities were given the ZIP Code 11385 in 1980.

By the mid-1980s, parts of Ridgewood had been given federal landmark designations. Young professionals were moving to the neighborhood in large numbers, and Ridgewood's homeownership rates increased.

== Demographics ==
Based on data from the 2010 United States census, the population of Ridgewood was 69,317, a decrease of 138 (0.2%) from the 69,455 counted in 2000. Covering an area of 1,156.31 acres (467.94 ha), the neighborhood had a population density of 59.9/acre (38,300/sq mi; 14,800/km^{2}).

The racial makeup of the neighborhood was 39.8% (27,558) White, 2.0% (1,380) African American, 0.1% (93) Native American, 7.7% (5,331) Asian, 0.0% (19) Pacific Islander, 0.3% (204) from other races, and 1.1% (765) from two or more races. Hispanic or Latino of any race were 49.0% (33,967) of the population.

The entirety of Community Board 5, which comprises Maspeth, Ridgewood, Middle Village, and Glendale, had 166,924 inhabitants as of NYC Health's 2018 Community Health Profile, with an average life expectancy of 81.4 years. This is about equal to the median life expectancy of 81.2 for all New York City neighborhoods. Most inhabitants are youth and middle-aged adults: 22% are between the ages of 0–17, 31% between 25 and 44, and 26% between 45 and 64. The ratio of college-aged and elderly residents was lower, at 8% and 13% respectively.

As of 2017, the median household income in Community Board 5 was $71,234. In 2018, an estimated 19% of Ridgewood and Maspeth residents lived in poverty, compared to 19% in all of Queens and 20% in all of New York City. One in seventeen residents (6%) were unemployed, compared to 8% in Queens and 9% in New York City. Rent burden, or the percentage of residents who have difficulty paying their rent, is 46% in Ridgewood and Maspeth, lower than the boroughwide and citywide rates of 53% and 51% respectively. Based on this calculation, as of 2018, Maspeth, Ridgewood, Middle Village, and Glendale are considered to be high-income relative to the rest of the city and not gentrifying.

== Land use and terrain ==
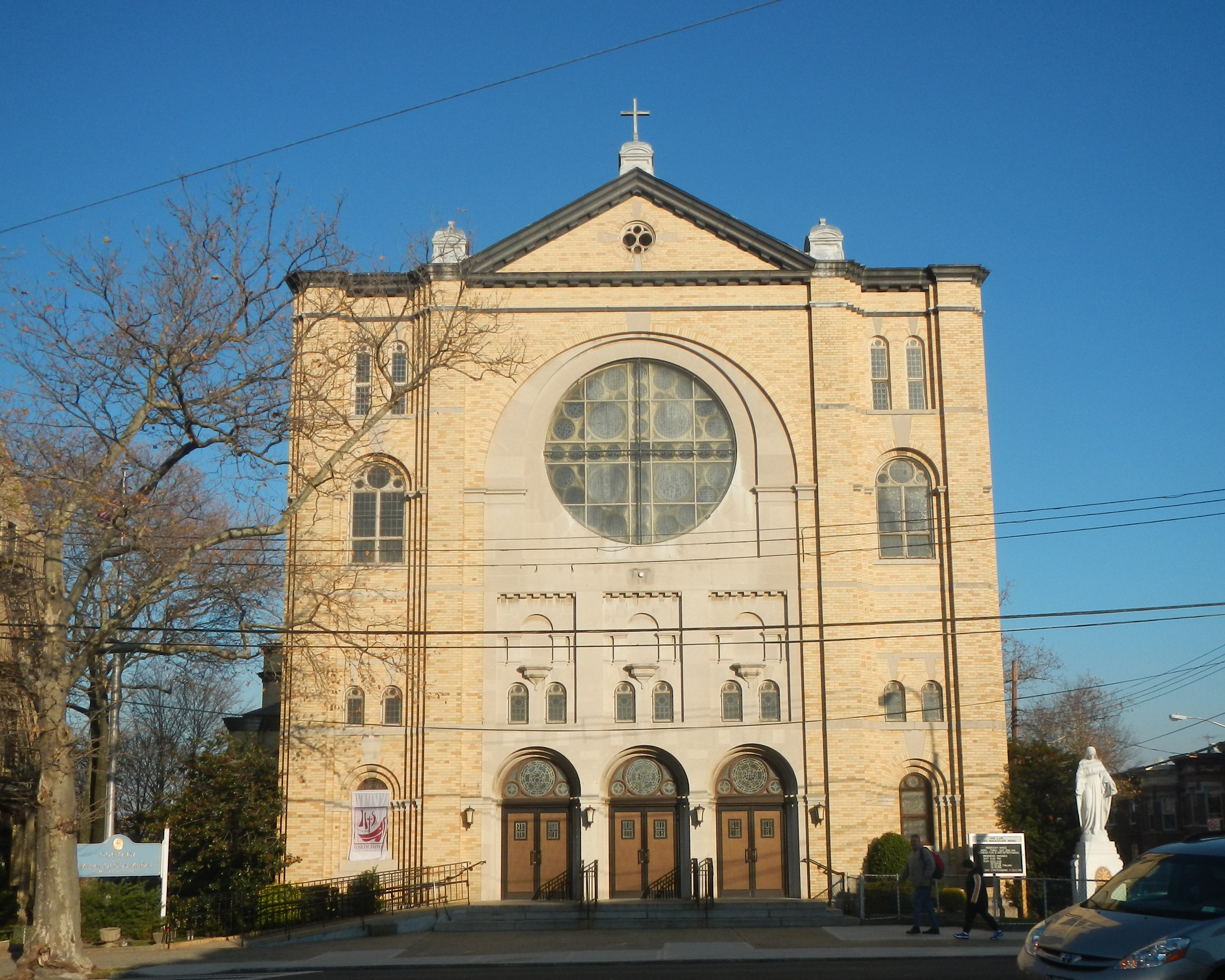
Our Lady of the Miraculous Medal Church

Ridgewood is zoned for various land uses, but is mostly commercial along main streets and residential alongside streets. Large parts of the neighborhood are residential historic districts. In addition, the large Cemetery Belt is located directly to the south.

The majority of the neighborhood covers a large hill, part of the glacial moraine that created Long Island, which starts at Metropolitan Avenue, rises steeply for about two blocks, then slopes down gently. For instance, at Our Lady of the Miraculous Medal Parish on 60th Place, the front entrance of the church is almost level with the second floor of the Parish school next door.

Part of Ridgewood around the Linden Hill United Methodist Cemetery and Linden Hill Jewish Cemetery, centered around Flushing and Metropolitan Avenues, was once known as Linden Hill, distinct from the neighborhood of Linden Hill in Flushing, Queens. Linden Street is named after this subsection of Ridgewood.

=== Residential ===
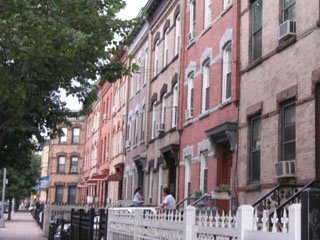
A typical block in Ridgewood

Ridgewood is a densely settled neighborhood, with housing stock ranging from six-family buildings near the Brooklyn border to two-family and single-family row houses deeper into Queens. Ridgewood is visually distinguished by the large amount of yellow face brick construction, which is characteristic of the early-20th-century rowhouses built in the neighborhoods.

Most of Ridgewood was developed block-by-block around the turn of the 20th century. Most of the buildings were designed by local architect Louis Berger & Co., which designed more than 5,000 buildings in the area. The neighborhood has been largely untouched by construction since then, leaving many centrally planned blocks of houses and tenements still in the same state as their construction. These blocks include the Mathews Flats (six-family cold water tenements), Ring-Gibson Houses (two- and four-family houses with stores), and Stier Houses (curved two-family rowhouses). Many of these houses are well-kept and retain much of their early 20th century appeal.

=== Commercial ===
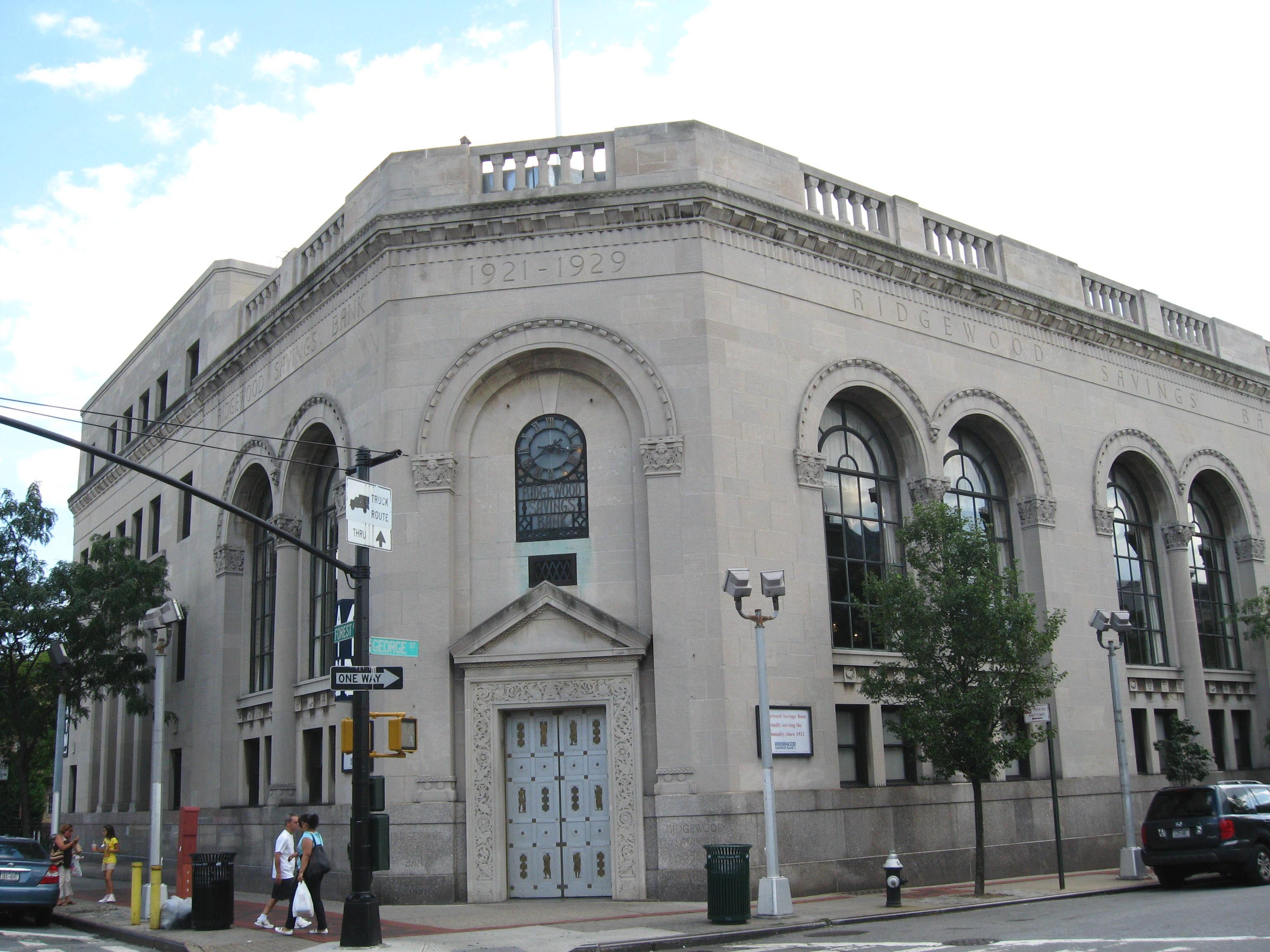
Ridgewood Savings Bank headquarters since 1929, located in Ridgewood

There are low-density commercial districts along Myrtle, Forest, and Metropolitan Avenues and Fresh Pond Road.

Ridgewood is home to Ridgewood Savings Bank, the largest mutual savings bank in New York State. Their headquarters is located at the intersection of Myrtle and Forest Avenues and was built in 1929. The building architects were Halsey, McCormack and Helmer, Inc. and the general contractors were Stamarith Construction Corporation. The building's exterior is made of limestone and contains an eight-foot granite base. The interior has travertine walls and marble floors.

=== Landmarks ===
==== Historic districts ====
In Ridgewood 10 national historic districts were listed on the National Register of Historic Places in 1983.

- 68th Avenue-64th Place Historic District
- Central Ridgewood Historic District
- Cornelia-Putnam Historic District
- Cypress Avenue East Historic District
- Cypress Avenue West Historic District
- Fresh Pond-Traffic Historic District
- Madison-Putnam-60th Place Historic District
- Seneca Avenue East Historic District
- Stockholm-DeKalb-Hart Historic District
- Summerfield Street Row Historic District

Map of New York City Historic Districts in Ridgewood

In addition, the New York City Landmarks Preservation Commission has designated four landmark districts in Ridgewood:

- Stockholm Street Historic District, designated 2000. This historic district consists of 36 two-story brick rowhouses, two garages, and a stable built primarily in 1907–1910 by Joseph Weiss & Company along Stockholm Street, the only remaining brick street in Ridgewood.
- Ridgewood North Historic District, designated 2009. This historic district includes 96 buildings, mostly three-story brick rowhouses called "Mathews Model Flats", built in 1908–1914 by the G.X. Mathews Company.
- Ridgewood South Historic District, designated 2010. This historic district includes 210 buildings, a large collection of three-story brick rowhouses as well as the St. Matthias Roman Catholic Church, built in 1911–1912 by the G.X. Mathews Company.
- Central Ridgewood Historic District, designated 2014. This historic district includes 990 buildings, mostly brick rowhouses, constructed in 1906–1915 by various small builders.

==== Individual landmarks ====
There are two individual city-designated landmarks:

- The Vander Ende-Onderdonk House, built in the mid-to-late 18th century and designated in 1995. The house was a crucial point in the 1769 survey that established the Kings–Queens county border.
- The Ridgewood Theater Building was built 1916 and designated in 2010. The 1,950 seat William Fox moviehouse operated until 2008 and is now a Blink Fitness.

The Vander Ende-Onderdonk House, the Evergreens Cemetery, and St. Matthias Roman Catholic Church Complex are listed on the National Register of Historic Places.

== Police and crime ==
Maspeth, Ridgewood, Middle Village, and Glendale are patrolled by the 104th Precinct of the NYPD, located at 64-02 Catalpa Avenue. The 104th Precinct ranked 21st safest out of 69 patrol areas for per-capita crime in 2010. However, the precinct covers a large diamond-shaped area, and Maspeth and Middle Village are generally seen as safer than Ridgewood. As of 2018, with a non-fatal assault rate of 19 per 100,000 people, Ridgewood and Maspeth's rate of violent crimes per capita is less than that of the city as a whole. The incarceration rate of 235 per 100,000 people is lower than that of the city as a whole.

The 104th Precinct has a lower crime rate than in the 1990s, with crimes across all categories having decreased by 87.4% between 1990 and 2018. The precinct reported 2 murders, 17 rapes, 140 robberies, 168 felony assaults, 214 burglaries, 531 grand larcenies, and 123 grand larcenies auto in 2018.

== Fire safety ==
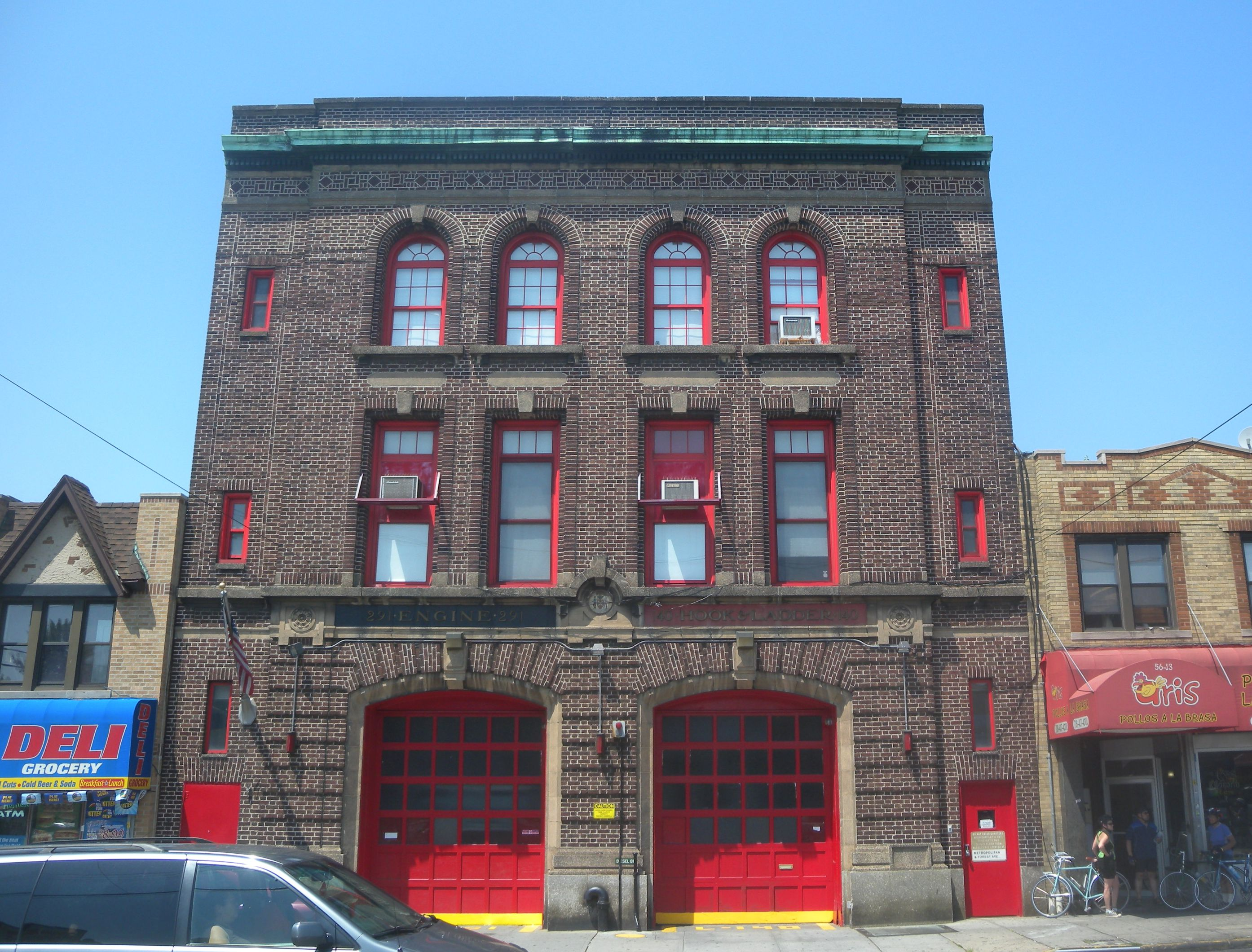
Engine Co. 291/Ladder Co. 40

Ridgewood contains a New York City Fire Department (FDNY) fire station, Engine Co. 291/Ladder Co. 140, at 56-07 Metropolitan Avenue.

== Health ==
As of 2018, preterm births and births to teenage mothers are less common in Ridgewood and Maspeth than in other places citywide. In Ridgewood and Maspeth, there were 70 preterm births per 1,000 live births (compared to 87 per 1,000 citywide), and 17.6 births to teenage mothers per 1,000 live births (compared to 19.3 per 1,000 citywide). Ridgewood and Maspeth have a low population of residents who are uninsured. In 2018, this population of uninsured residents was estimated to be 13%, slightly higher than the citywide rate of 12%.

The concentration of fine particulate matter, the deadliest type of air pollutant, in Ridgewood and Maspeth is 0.008 mg/m^{3} (8.0×10^{−9} oz/ft^{3}), more than the city average. Twenty percent of Ridgewood and Maspeth residents are smokers, which is higher than the city average of 14% of residents being smokers. In Ridgewood and Maspeth, 19% of residents are obese, 7% are diabetic, and 20% have high blood pressure—compared to the citywide averages of 22%, 8%, and 23% respectively. In addition, 19% of children are obese, compared to the citywide average of 20%.

Ninety-two percent of residents eat some fruits and vegetables every day, which is higher than the city's average of 87%. In 2018, 78% of residents described their health as "good", "very good", or "excellent", equal to the city's average of 78%. For every supermarket in Ridgewood and Maspeth, there are 5 bodegas.

The nearest major hospitals are Elmhurst Hospital Center in Elmhurst and the Wyckoff Heights Medical Center in Bushwick.

== Post offices and ZIP Code ==
Ridgewood is covered by ZIP Code 11385, which it shares with neighboring Glendale. The United States Post Office operates three post offices nearby:

- Fresh Pond Station – 60-80 Woodbine Street
- Ridgewood Station – 60-60 Myrtle Avenue
- Wyckoff Heights Station – 86 Wyckoff Avenue

=== Border with Bushwick ===
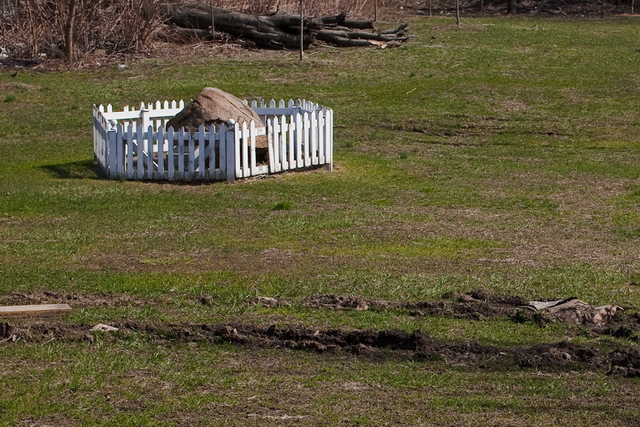
Arbitration Rock, where the county border was set in 1769

Today, Ridgewood's land area lies within Queens County. However, its political boundary with Brooklyn causes confusion and debate about where the western boundary of Ridgewood truly lies and whether part of Ridgewood is considered to be actually part of Brooklyn. The political dispute dates to the 17th century, when Newtown was under English rule and Boswijck was under Dutch rule. Disputes over the boundary between the two settlements continued until 1769, when a boundary line was drawn through what later became known as the Arbitration Rock. The street grid plan in Ridgewood and Bushwick was laid out in the late 19th century. Because the Arbitration Rock lay along a diagonal with this grid plan, numerous houses were built on the Brooklyn-Queens boundary, their owners sometimes subject to taxes from both counties. During the 19th century, this resulted in situations where some houses received water and fire protection from what was then the city of Brooklyn, while their neighbors in Queens had to rely on volunteer firefighting squads and paid exorbitant water bills to private utilities in Elmhurst.

In 1925, the political boundary was adapted to the street grid, resulting in a zig-zag pattern. (Note: Traveling south from the Newtown Creek, the border traveled on the following streets: Southeast onto Onderdonk Avenue; Southwest onto Flushing Avenue; Southeast onto Cypress Avenue; Southwest onto Grove Street; Southeast onto St. Nicholas Avenue; Southwest onto Palmetto Street; Southeast onto Wyckoff Avenue; Southwest onto Covert Street; Southeast onto Irving Avenue; The border then entered Most Holy Trinity Cemetery and the Cemetery of the Evergreens.) The change resulted in 2,543 persons' addresses being reassigned from Queens to Brooklyn, and 135 persons' addresses reassigned from Brooklyn to Queens. Modern addresses in the two boroughs can be distinguished by the presence or absence of a hyphen in the house number. Queens's house numbering system uses a hyphen between the closest cross-street (which comes before the hyphen) and the actual address (which comes after the hyphen). While buildings fronting on streets that are west of Forest Avenue and the Bay Ridge Branch follow the Queens address numbering system, the avenues which run parallel to the county line—bounded by Metropolitan Avenue to the north, Forest Avenue to the east, and the Brooklyn border to the south—do not follow this address numbering system. Streets in this area that run perpendicular to the county line are demarcated by a jump in numbering sequence between the two boroughs.

=== ZIP Code changes ===
Since at least 1898, when the boroughs of Brooklyn and Queens were created as part of the City of Greater New York, Glendale and Ridgewood's postal mail had been routed through the main Brooklyn post office in Williamsburg, rather than the main post office in Flushing, because they are located closer to Williamsburg. When ZIP Codes were assigned in 1963, the neighborhoods were assigned Brooklyn ZIP Codes with the 112 prefix, along with all areas whose mail was routed through a Brooklyn post office. This gave Glendale and Ridgewood a Brooklyn mailing address despite actually being located in Queens. The neighborhoods' ZIP Code of 11237 was shared with Bushwick, Brooklyn, as well as with Wyckoff Heights on the border of the two boroughs. After the 1977 New York City blackout, newspapers around the country published UPI and Associated Press' photos of Bushwick residents with stolen items and a police officer beating a suspected looter, and Bushwick became known for riots and looting. Afterward, the communities of Ridgewood and Glendale expressed a desire to disassociate themselves from Bushwick.

Following complaints from residents, Postmaster General William Bolger proposed that the ZIP Codes would be changed if United States Representative Geraldine Ferraro could produce evidence that 70% of residents supported it. After Ferraro's office distributed ballots to residents, 93 percent of the returned ballots voted for the change. The change to ZIP Code 11385 was made effective January 13, 1980.

== Newspaper ==
The Ridgewood Times, established in 1908 and now known as the Times Newsweekly, serves as the community newspaper. It is published in English and was formerly published in German as well.

The Ridgewood Post is an online version of the community newspaper. It is a part of the Queens Post group, a subsidiary of Outer Boro Media, which publishes seven local news sites in Queens and one in North Brooklyn.

== Education ==
Ridgewood and Maspeth generally have a lower rate of college-educated residents than the rest of the city as of 2018. While 33% of residents age 25 and older have a college education or higher, 16% have less than a high school education and 50% are high school graduates or have some college education. By contrast, 39% of Queens residents and 43% of city residents have a college education or higher. The percentage of Ridgewood and Maspeth students excelling in math rose from 36% in 2000 to 67% in 2011, and reading achievement rose from 42% to 49% during the same time period.

Ridgewood and Maspeth's rate of elementary school student absenteeism is less than the rest of New York City. In Ridgewood and Maspeth, 14% of elementary school students missed twenty or more days per school year, lower than the citywide average of 20%. Additionally, 82% of high school students in Ridgewood and Maspeth graduate on time, more than the citywide average of 75%.

=== Schools ===
Ridgewood's public schools are operated by the New York City Department of Education. Ridgewood contains the following public elementary schools, which serve grades PK-5 unless otherwise indicated:

- PS 68
- PS 71
- PS 81
- PS 88
- PS 239
- PS 305 (PK-3)

The following middle schools are located in Ridgewood:

- IS 77
- IS 93

Grover Cleveland High School is the only high school in Ridgewood, and is the zoned public high school to most of Ridgewood.

There are two Catholic grammar schools located in the neighborhood. The first one is the Notre Dame Catholic Academy (formerly known as Our Lady of the Miraculous Medal School) located on Bleecker and 61st Streets. The second one is St. Matthias Catholic Academy located on Catalpa Avenue between Onderdonk and Woodward Avenues.

=== Libraries ===
The Queens Public Library's Ridgewood branch is located at 20-12 Madison Street.

The Brooklyn Public Library's Washington Irving branch is located at 360 Irving Avenue near Woodbine Street, just across Ridgewood's border with Bushwick. The Queens and Brooklyn public library systems are separate and not interchangeable.

== Transportation ==
The New York City Subway's BMT Myrtle Avenue Line (M train) runs through the heart of Ridgewood with stops at Seneca Avenue, Forest Avenue, and Fresh Pond Road. Additionally, the Myrtle–Wyckoff Avenues station, in the southern portion of Ridgewood, is a transportation hub serving the Myrtle Avenue Line, the BMT Canarsie Line (L train), and several buses. At the end of the Myrtle Avenue Line is the Fresh Pond Yard, a storage yard for the M train. Halsey Street (L train) has entrances in both Ridgewood and Bushwick.

The Ridgewood Terminal at the Myrtle–Wyckoff Avenues station serves New York City Bus' B13, B26, B52, B54, Q55, Q58 and Q98 lines. The B20, B38, B57, Q14, Q38, Q39, Q54 and Q67 bus lines also serve Ridgewood. In addition, the neighborhood is home to the large Fresh Pond Bus Depot, which services many of the buses that run throughout Brooklyn and Queens.

== Parks and recreation ==
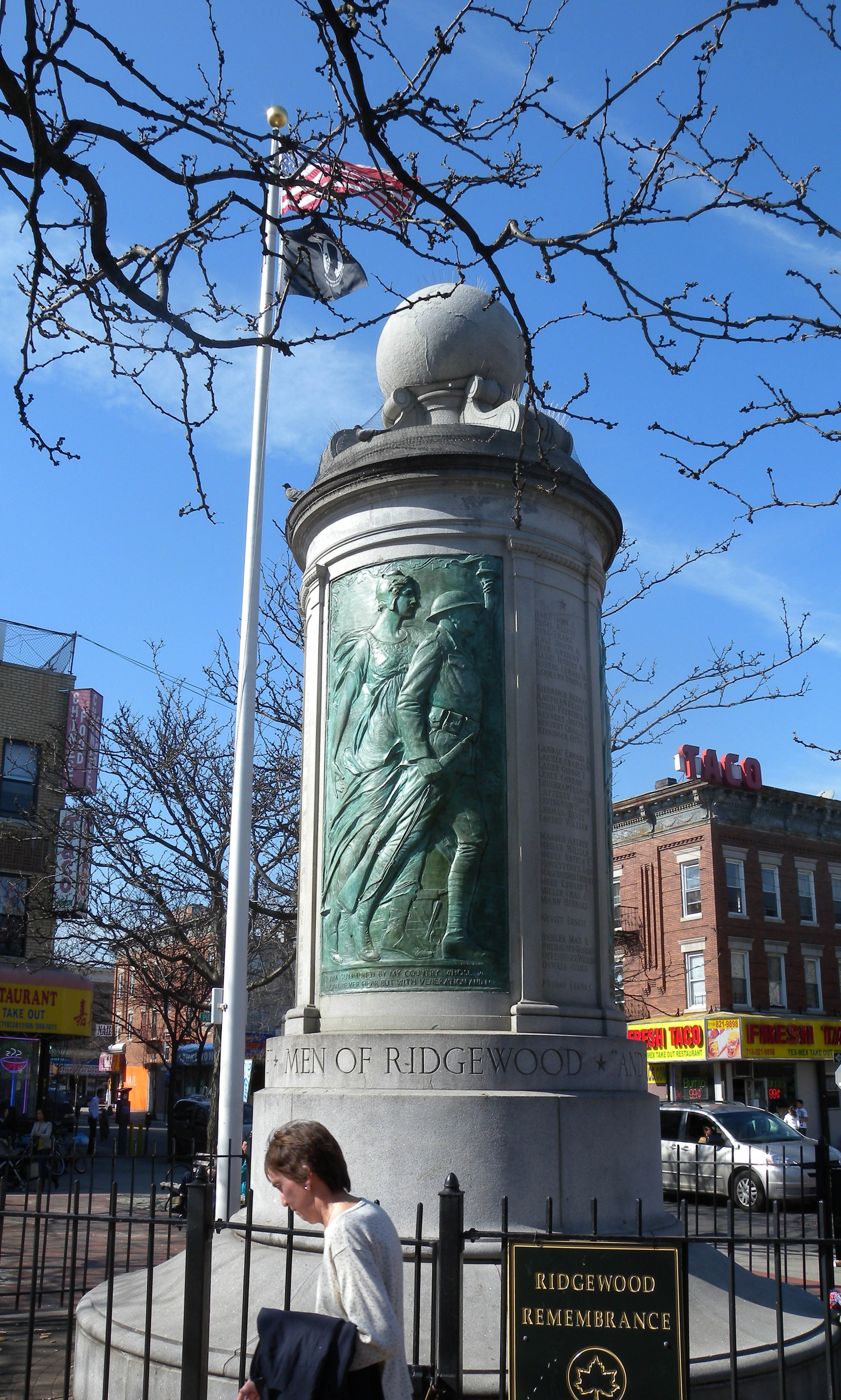
Ridgewood Veterans Triangle

The Ridgewood Park baseball ground, built on land owned by William Wallace, was part of a larger entertainment area bounded by Wyckoff Avenue, Covert Street, Halsey Street, and Irving Avenue. From 1886 to 1889, it was home to the Brooklyn Bridegrooms (later the Brooklyn Dodgers and now the Los Angeles Dodgers) for their Sunday games. The property continued to operate until 1959. Another similarly named site, called Grauer's Ridgewood Park, was located between Myrtle Avenue, Cypress Avenue, Seneca Avenue, and Decatur Street, and was used mainly as a picnic site.

Mafera Park, named after former Queens borough president Joseph F. Mafera, is located south of the Fresh Pond Junction, between the Myrtle Avenue elevated line to the west and the Bay Ridge Branch to the east.

== Notable people ==
Notable current and former residents of Ridgewood include:

- Pedro Beato (born 1986), pitcher who played for the New York Mets
- James Cagney (1899–1986), actor
- Peter Daempfle (born 1970), author
- Chris Distefano (born 1984), comedian
- Joe Duplantier (born 1976), French-American musician and producer, owner of Silver Cord Studio (Rockwall studios complex on the Halsey stop)
- Ron Eldard (born 1965), actor
- Philip Giaccone (1932–1981), Bonanno crime family capo
- Nick Hakim (born 1992), singer-songwriter
- Jeremy Allen White (Born 1991), American actor
- Mitski (born 1990), singer-songwriter
- Jeannie Ortega (born 1986), recording artist, songwriter, actress
- Rosie Perez (born 1964), actress (attended school in Ridgewood)
- Tommy Ramone (1949–2014), musician, original member of the Ramones
- Katie Sandwina (1884–1952), circus strongwoman and one time "Strongest Woman in the World" opened a restaurant at 70–02 Cypress Hills Street in 1942
- Dan Schneider (born 1965), poet and critic
- Genesis P-Orridge (1950–2020), avant-garde musician (Throbbing Gristle, Psychic TV)
- Bob Sheppard (1910–2010), public address announcer for the New York Yankees and New York Giants
- Gus Van (1886–1968), singer and vaudeville star, part of the team of Van & Schenck
- Reginald VelJohnson (born 1952), actor
- John Ventimiglia (born 1963), actor who played Artie Bucco on The Sopranos
- John Wilson (born 1986), documentary filmmaker

== In popular culture ==
- Parquet Courts' 2013 song "Stoned and Starving" includes the lyric "I was walking through Ridgewood, Queens".
- The 2016 feature film White Girl is set in Ridgewood.
