= Stockholm–DeKalb–Hart Historic District =

Historic district in Queens, New York

- U.S. National Register of Historic Places
- U.S. Historic district
- New York State Register of Historic Places
- New York City Landmark
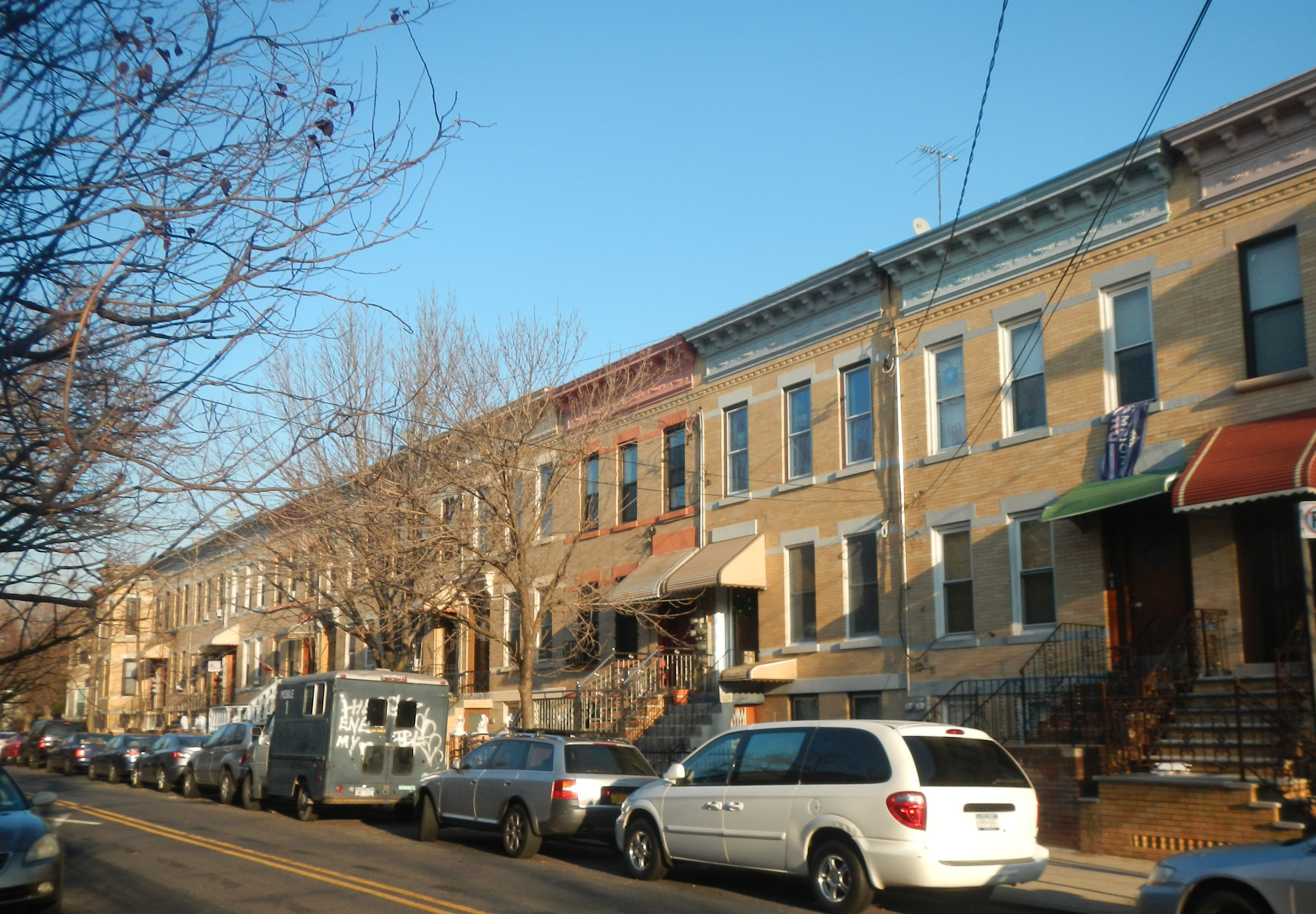

- Location within New York City Location within New York Location within the United States
- Location: Roughly DeKalb and Woodward Aves., Stockholm and Hart Sts., New York, New York
- Coordinates: 40°42′32″N 73°54′52″W
- Area: 5.5 acres (2.2 ha)
- Built: 1905
- MPS: Ridgewood MRA
- NRHP reference No.: 83004618
- NYCL No.: 2081

Significant dates
- Added to NRHP: September 30, 1983
- Designated NYSRHP: August 17, 1983
- Designated NYCL: November 28, 2000

Stockholm–DeKalb–Hart Historic District is a national historic district in Ridgewood, Queens, New York. It includes 79 contributing buildings built between 1900 and 1915. They consist mainly of brick two-story row houses with one apartment per floor. Some buildings feature three bay wide wood porches with Tuscan columns.

It was listed on the National Register of Historic Places in 1983. Part of the NRHP district overlaps with the New York City Landmarks Preservation Commission's Stockholm Street Historic District.
