= St. Matthias Roman Catholic Church =

Historic church in New York, United States

- St. Matthias Roman Catholic Church Complex
- U.S. National Register of Historic Places
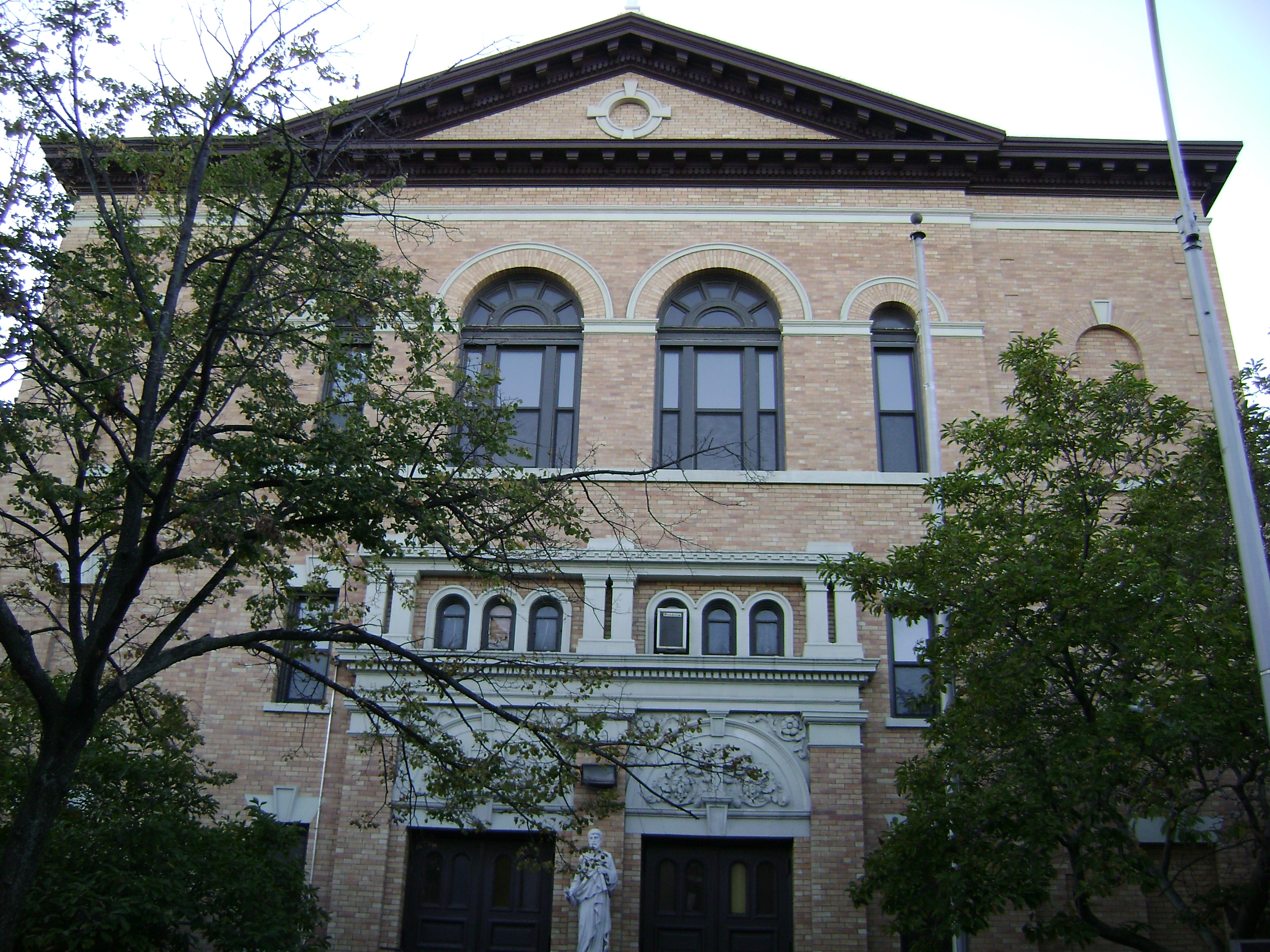
- St. Matthias Roman Catholic Church Complex, September 2013

- Location within New York City Location within New York Location within the United States
- Location: 58-15 Catalpa Ave., Ridgewood, New York
- Coordinates: 40°42′07″N 73°54′10″W
- Area: 1.42 acres (0.57 ha)
- Built: 1909, 1910, 1926
- Architect: Berlenbach, F.J.
- Architectural style: Italian Renaissance Revival
- NRHP reference No.: 12000599
- Added to NRHP: September 4, 2012

St. Matthias Church is a parish of the Roman Catholic Church in the Ridgewood neighborhood of Queens County, New York, in the Diocese of Brooklyn.

Its historic buildings include the parish church, completed in 1926, an Italian Renaissance Revival style, brick, stone, and terra cotta church with a gable roof which features a three-stage bell tower at the projecting center bay and Corinthian order columns. Also on the property are the contributing four-story rectory (1910), school (1909, 1913, 1950), and convent (1914). The entire complex was listed on the National Register of Historic Places in 2012.

== History ==
Charles Edward McDonnell, Bishop of Brooklyn, created the parish on May 2, 1908, appointing Rev. Nicholas M. Wagner as first pastor. In September, Wagner negotiated the purchase of 20 lots on Elm Avenue (now Catalpa Avenue), and construction of the original church was underway by March, a building now used by the parochial school.

After World War I, fundraising and construction for a larger structure began, with the basement church completed in 1919. The cornerstone of the current church was laid October 5, 1924, and the building was completed in 1926.
