= Vander Ende–Onderdonk House =

Historic house in Queens, New York

- Vander Ende–Onderdonk House Site
- U.S. National Register of Historic Places
- New York City Landmark
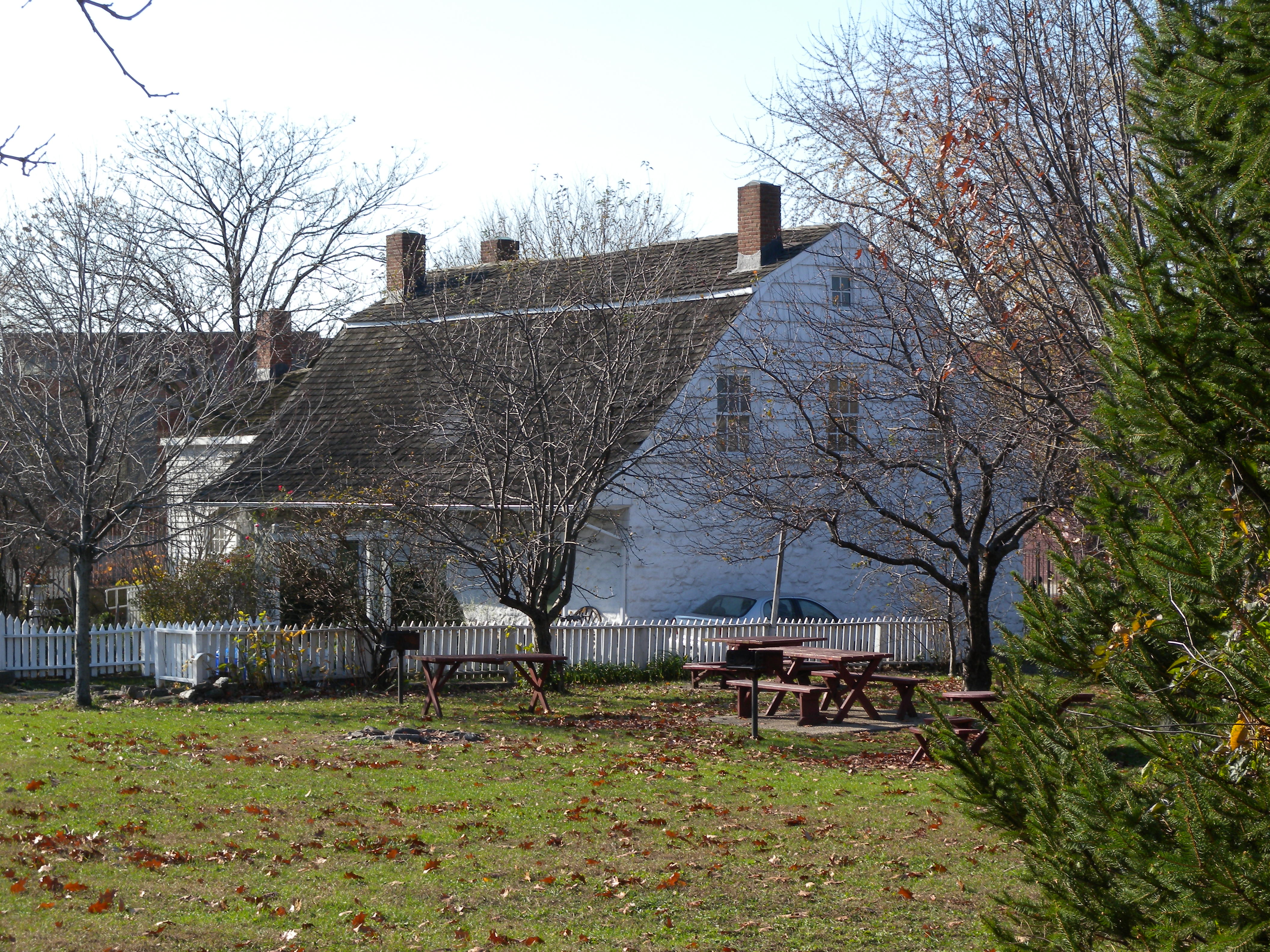

- Location within New York City Location within New York Location within the United States
- Location: 1820 Flushing Avenue, Ridgewood, New York
- Coordinates: 40°42′40″N 73°55′12″W
- Area: 2 acres (0.81 ha)
- Built: 1661
- NRHP reference No.: 77000975
- NYCL No.: 1923

Significant dates
- Added to NRHP: January 31, 1977
- Designated NYCL: March 21, 1995

The Vander Ende–Onderdonk House, also known as the Van Nanda House, is a historic house at 1820 Flushing Avenue in Ridgewood, Queens, New York City. It is the oldest Dutch Colonial stone house in New York City.

The house is owned by the Greater Ridgewood Historical Society. Much of the house now functions as a museum of earlier eras of New York.

== History ==
The original house on the site was built in 1661 by Hendrick Barents Smidt, from land that was granted to him by Peter Stuyvesant. Another part of the structure, expanding from the original house, was built in 1709 by Paulus Vander Ende. The house was inherited by Paulus's son Frederik, who changed his last name to Van Nanda; Frederik's daughter Jane and his son-in-law Moses Beadel inherited the house next in 1769. The house was mentioned in a 1769 survey that established the boundary between Kings and Queens counties and may have been largely constructed around this time; it is very close to the border. The Onderdonk family acquired the property in 1821. The old address was 1416 Flushing Avenue. The property once included 100 acres of farmland, but land was gradually sold until the property was reduced to under two acres.

In 1975, the house suffered a serious fire that destroyed many of its wooden elements. The house was added to the National Register of Historic Places in 1977. The building was repaired in the early 1980s with the aid of half a million dollars of federal funds; due to its historic status, it was rebuilt using the original tools and styles of the colonial era. It was designated a landmark by the New York City Landmarks Preservation Commission in 1995.

In 2001, the Arbitration Rock was believed to be rediscovered, an ancient rock used to measure property claims and deeds in the late 1700s and early 1800s. The Rock was moved in August 2001 to the backyard of the Vander Ende–Onderdonk House. The house's roof was restored in 2014. After a decade-long fundraising effort, restoration of the exterior commenced in 2026.

== Gallery ==
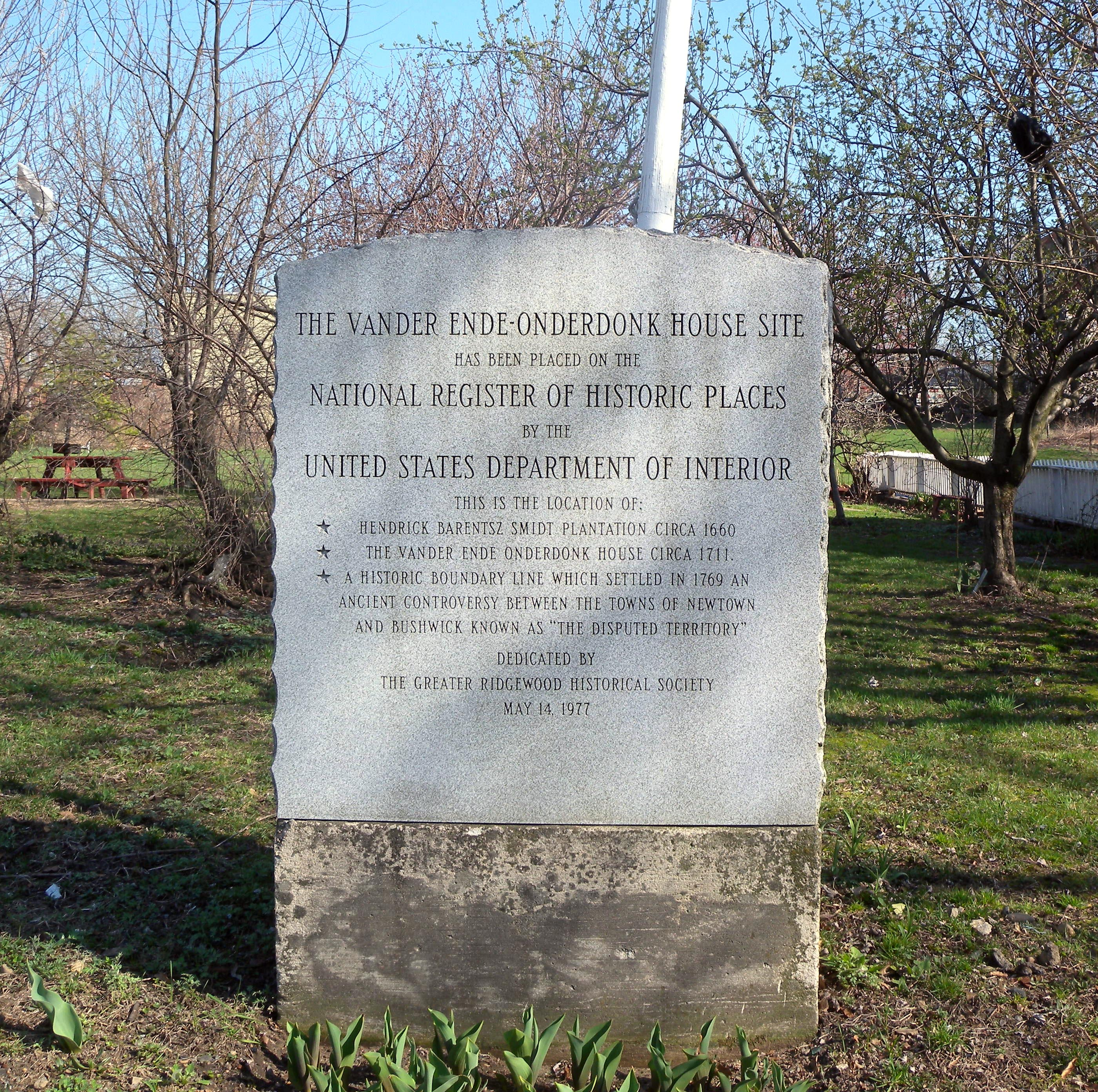
A 1977 marker commemorating the NRHP designation

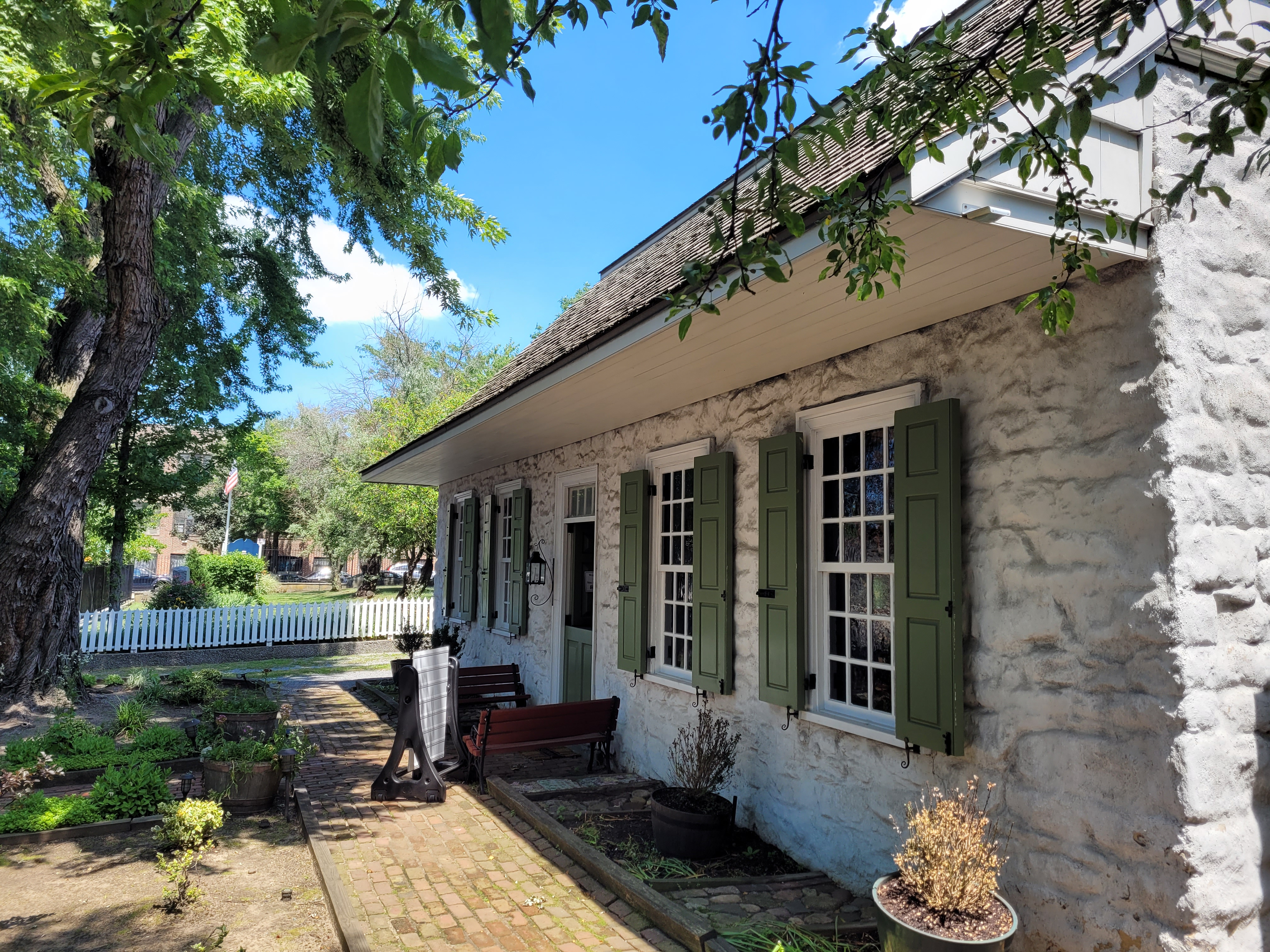
Exterior of the Vander Ende–Onderdonk House in 2022

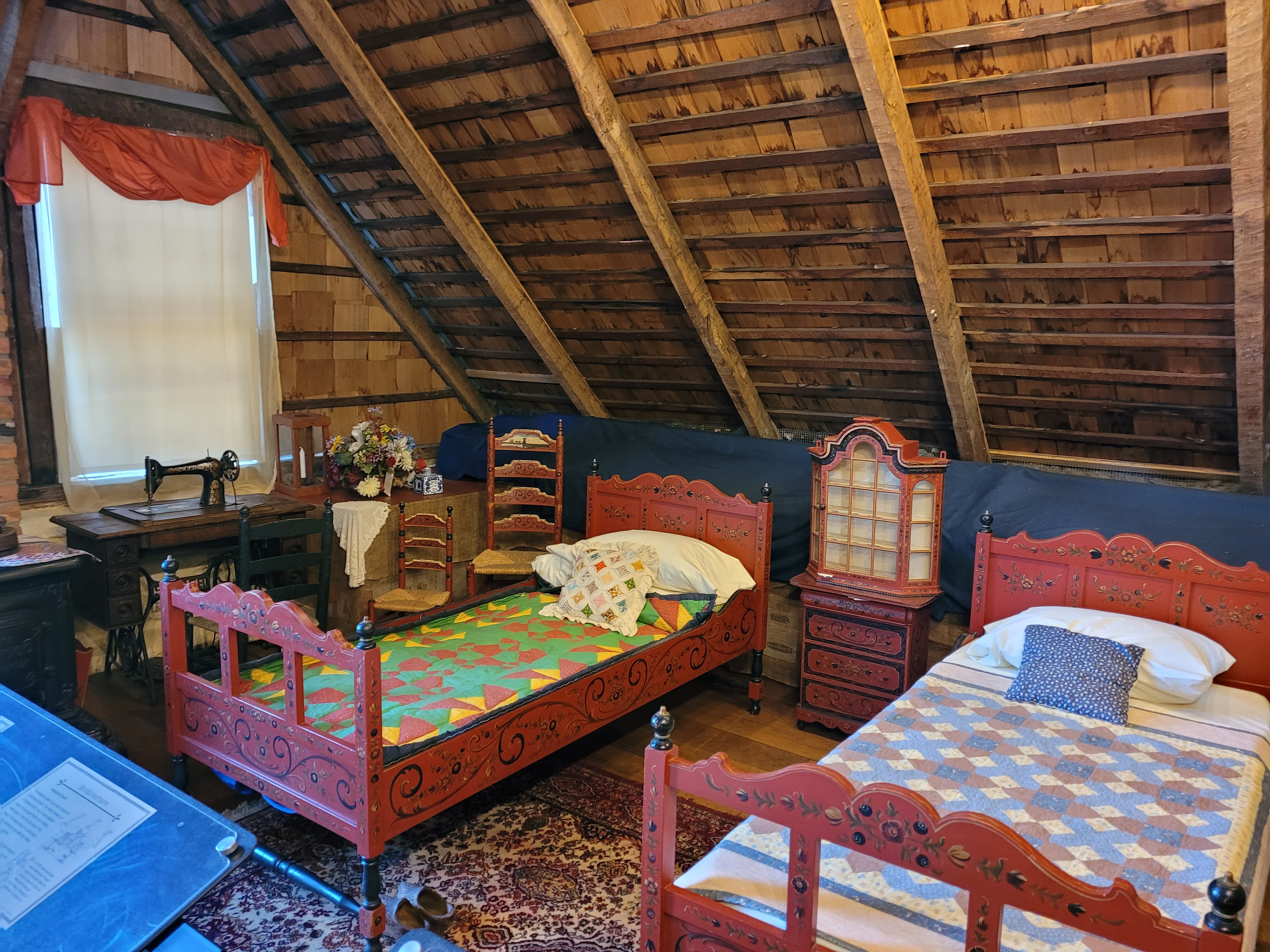
Attic of the Vander Ende–Onderdonk House in 2022

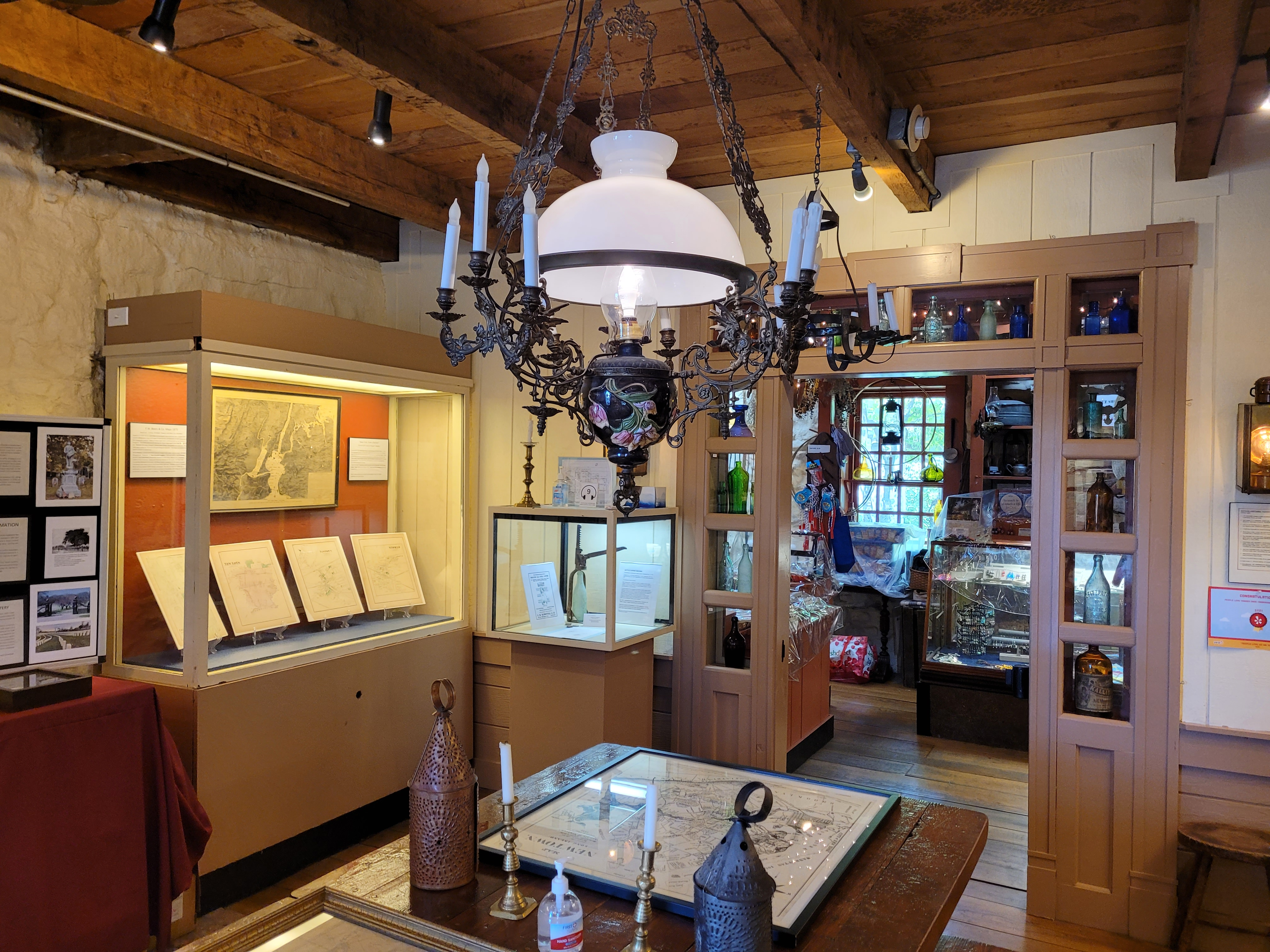
A 1st floor room of the Vander Ende–Onderdonk House, now used as museum space

== See also ==
- List of the oldest buildings in New York
- List of New York City Designated Landmarks in Queens
- National Register of Historic Places listings in Queens County, New York
