= Cornelia–Putnam Historic District =

Historic district in Queens, New York

- U.S. National Register of Historic Places
- U.S. Historic district
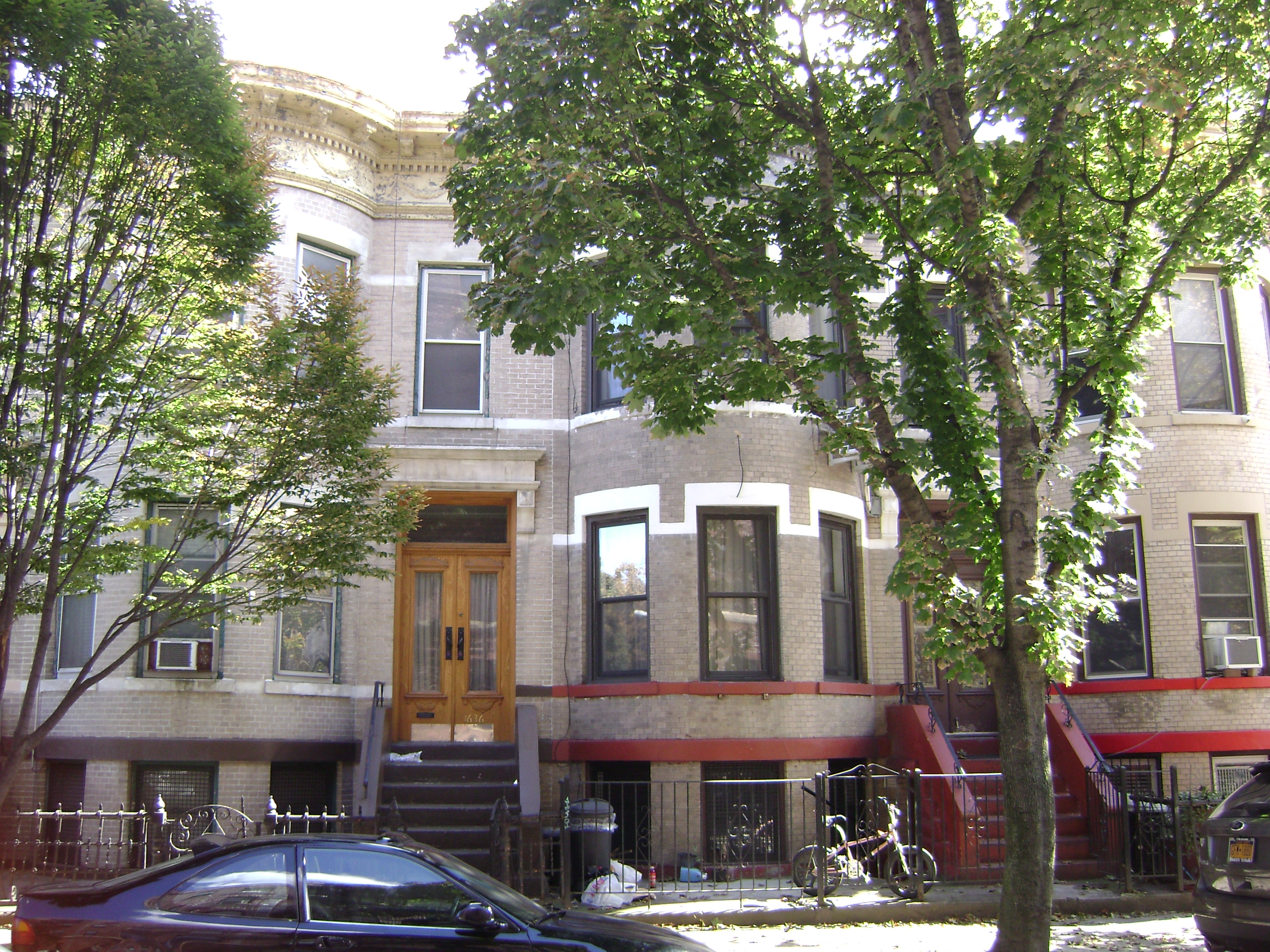

- Location within New York City Location within New York Location within the United States
- Location: Residential buildings on Cornelia Street and Putnam Ave, bounded by Jefferson St., Wyckoff, and Myrtle Aves., New York, New York
- Coordinates: 40°41′56″N 73°54′27″W
- Area: 6 acres (2.4 ha)
- Built: 1907
- Architect: Berger, Louis, & Co.
- Architectural style: Renaissance, Romanesque
- MPS: Ridgewood MRA
- NRHP reference No.: 83001766
- Added to NRHP: September 30, 1983

Cornelia–Putnam Historic District is a national historic district in Ridgewood, Queens, New York. It includes 87 contributing buildings built between 1907 and 1922. They consist of two story, flat front brick rowhouse dwellings with one apartment per floor and three story tenements with two apartments per floor. They are constructed of yellow and amber brick with brownstone trim.

Addresses in the district include:

- Putnam Avenue
  - 16-12 to 16-74
- Cornelia Street
  - 16-11 to 16-77
  - 16-22 to 16-80

It was listed on the National Register of Historic Places in 1983.
