= Ridgewood Times =

Newspaper in New York City, 1908 to 1989

The newspaper in this article is distinct from the TimesLedger — they are owned by the same media group but are different publications.

The Ridgewood Times was a newspaper based in Ridgewood, Queens, that ran from 1908 to 1989. It served and reported on events in the Ridgewood, Germania Heights, Metropolitan, Maspeth, St. James Park, Forest Park, Evergreen, and Glendale areas. In 1989 the newspaper became the Times Newsweekly, and today the publication runs joint imprints of both the Times Newsweekly and the Ridgewood Times.

== History ==
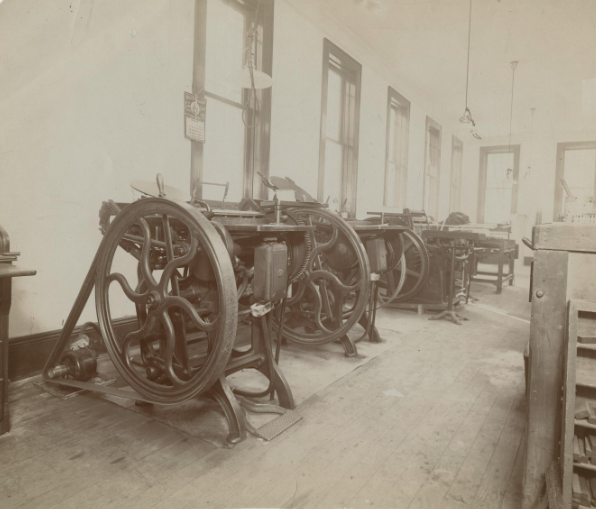
Ridgewood Times printing press, circa 1911

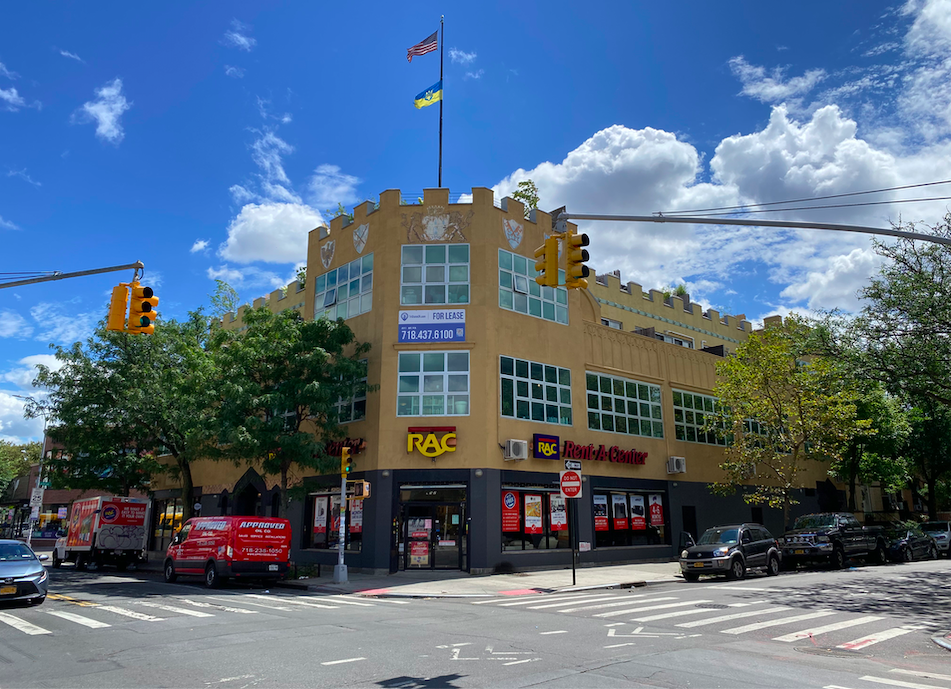
The former Ridgewood Times building, 2023

The Ridgewood Times was founded in 1908 by George Schubel as a weekly paper. Its early focuses included civic organizations such as the Glendale Taxpayers Association (now the Glendale Property Owners Association) and the Ridgewood Property Owners and Civic Association. The newspaper's headquarters was originally located at 852 Cypress Avenue, where it was based until the 1970s. Due to the large population of German immigrants in the area, its first issue was published in both English and German.

In 1920, Schubel expanded the newspaper to include the WHN radio station, covering sports, weather, and other events. It was ultimately unsuccessful, and Schubel sold the station to Loew's Theaters in 1926.

Carl Clemens became editor and publisher in the 1940s, and served in the role until his retirement in 1987. He joined the staff of the paper at 16 as a volunteer while a student at the Queensboro Business Institute, which shared a building with the Ridgewood Times. He was later hired as a writer and radio announcer by George Schubel prior to taking over the paper. Under his leadership, the Times became the largest weekly newspaper in the nation, circulating 20,000 copies a week.

In 1981, staff reporter Maureen Walthers became the Times' first female editor, as well as executive vice president and co-owner. In 1983, she purchased the paper from Clemens, and it was subsequently renamed the Times Newsweekly. The Times Newsweekly had a larger distribution through northwestern and southwestern Queens communities, extending to Astoria and south Howard Beach. Walthers remained editor until 2015, which the paper was sold to Schneps Media Group.

== Legacy ==
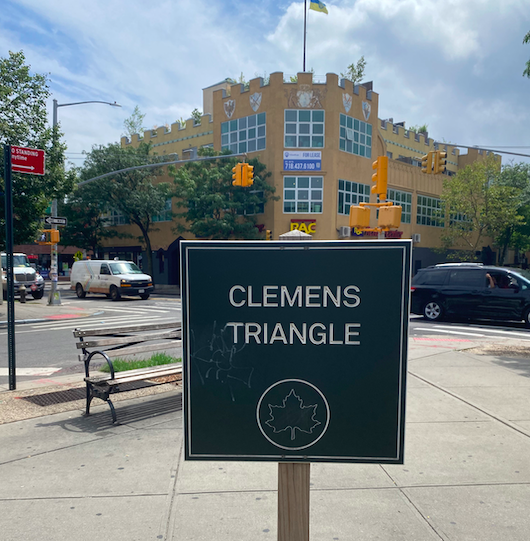
Clemens Triangle, 2023

In 1936, the Board of Aldermen established the "Times Triangle" park across from former Ridgewood Times building at 852 Cypress Avenue. In 1985, then-Mayor Ed Koch renamed the park the Clemens Triangle in honor of Carl Clemens and his community organizing and work on the Ridgewood Times. It is located at the intersection of Myrtle and Cypress Avenues, and Cornelia Street.
