= Summerfield Street Row Historic District =

Historic district in Queens, New York

- U.S. National Register of Historic Places
- U.S. Historic district
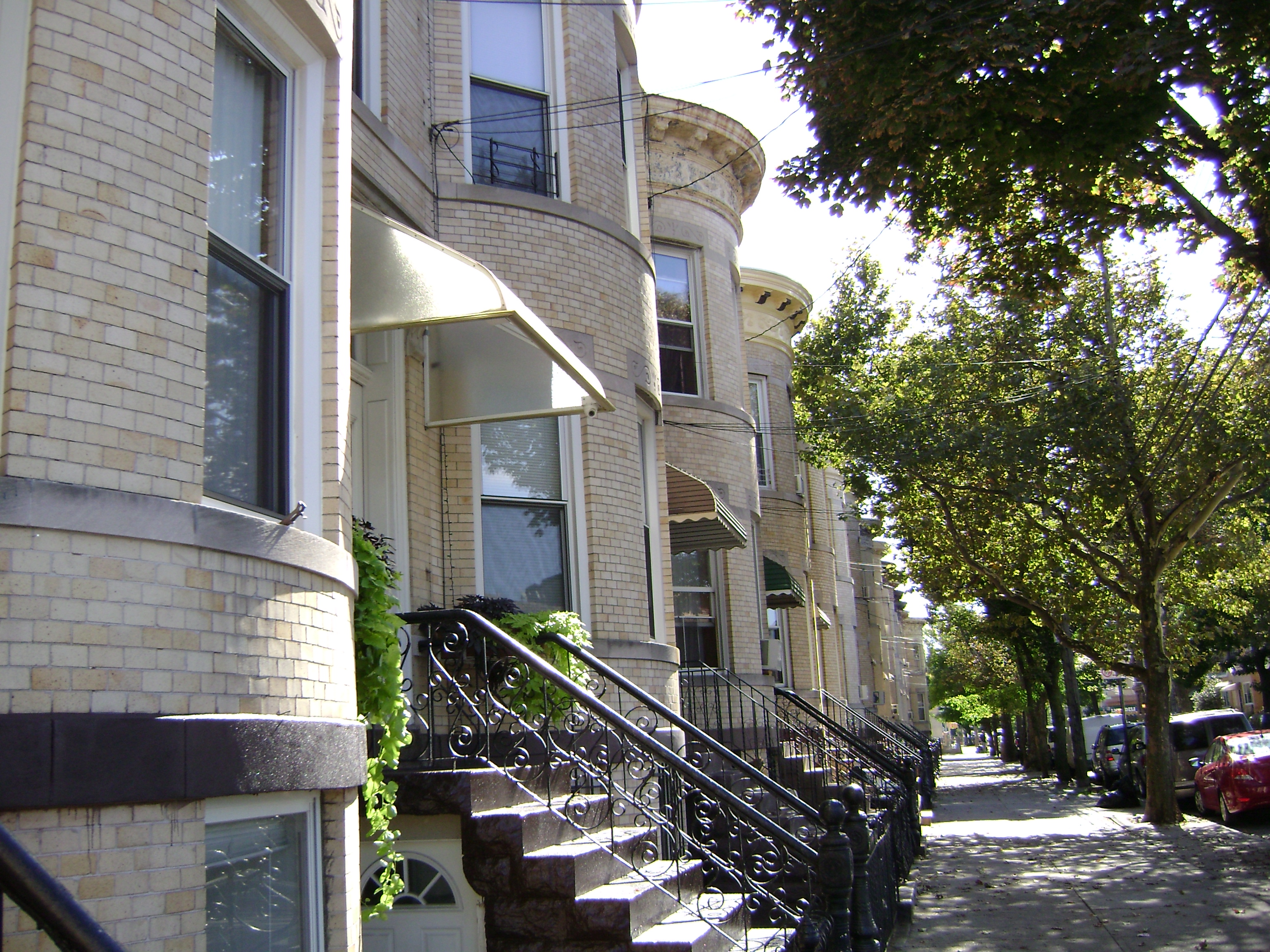

- Location within New York City Location within New York Location within the United States
- Location: 59-12 - 59-48 Summerfield St., New York, New York
- Coordinates: 40°42′0.9252″N 73°53′48.3174″W
- Area: 1.8 acres (0.73 ha)
- Built: 1912
- Architect: Erbach, Jacob; Berger, Louis, & Co.
- Architectural style: Renaissance, Romanesque
- MPS: Ridgewood MRA
- NRHP reference No.: 83001781
- Added to NRHP: September 30, 1983

Summerfield Street Row Historic District is a national historic district in Ridgewood, Queens, New York. It includes 19 contributing buildings built in 1912. They are brick two story row houses with one apartment per floor. They feature round bays and yellow iron-spot brick facades.

It was listed on the National Register of Historic Places in 1983.
