= Madison–Putnam–60th Place Historic District =

Historic district in Queens, New York

- U.S. National Register of Historic Places
- U.S. Historic district
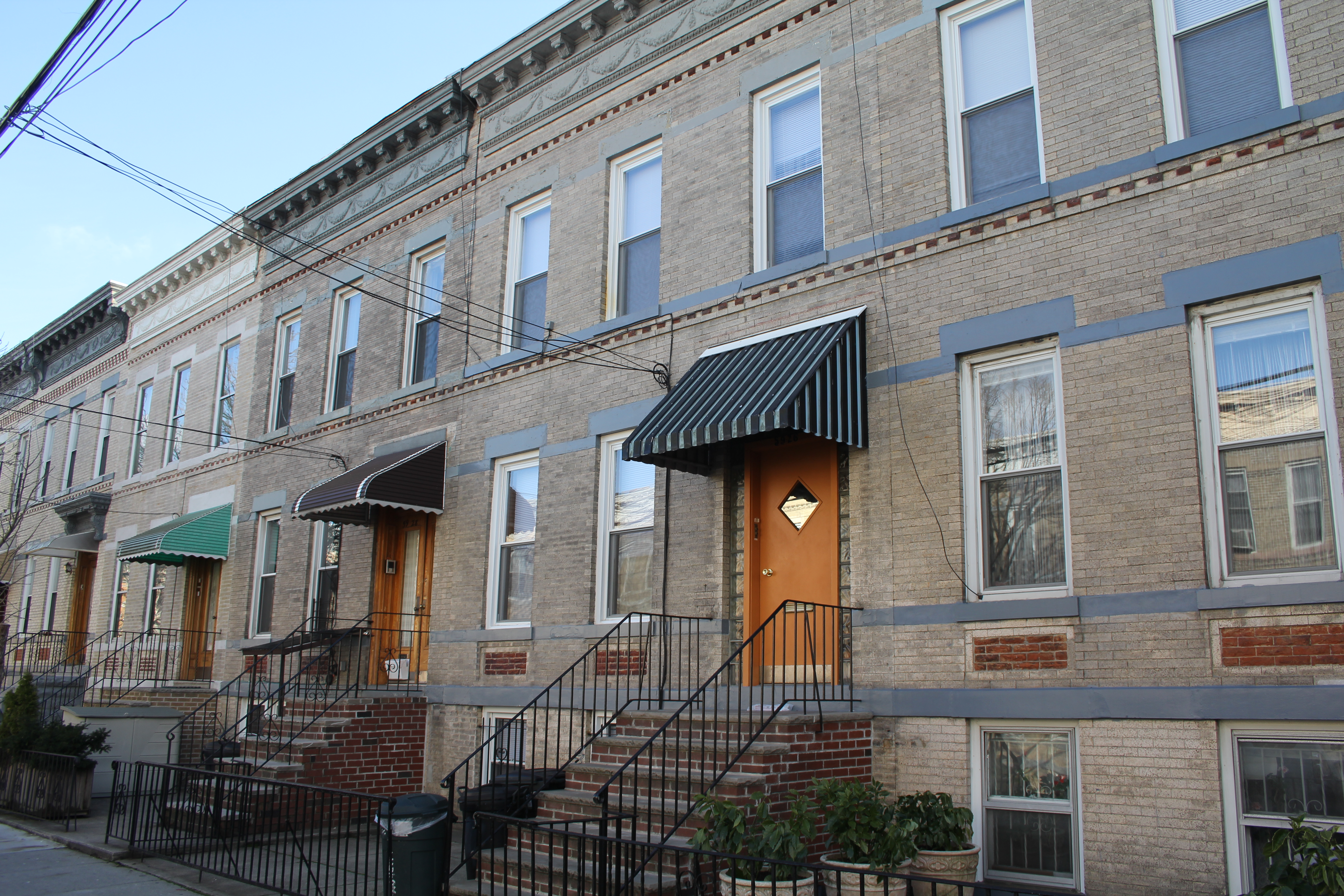
- A row of houses in the district

- Location within New York City Location within New York Location within the United States
- Location: Roughly bounded by Woodbine St., 60th Pl., 67th and Forest Aves., New York, New York
- Coordinates: 40°42′21″N 73°54′6″W
- Area: 10 acres (4.0 ha)
- Built: 1900
- Architect: Berger, Louis, & Co.
- Architectural style: Renaissance, Romanesque
- MPS: Ridgewood MRA
- NRHP reference No.: 83001777
- Added to NRHP: September 30, 1983

The Madison–Putnam–60th Place Historic District is a national historic district in Ridgewood, Queens, New York. It includes 145 contributing buildings built between 1900 and 1920. They consist mainly of brick two story row houses with one apartment per floor and three story tenements with two apartments per floor. They feature brick facades and Romanesque Revival style detailing. Also included in the district is the Old Queens Labor Lyceum.

It was listed on the National Register of Historic Places in 1983.
