= 68th Avenue–64th Place Historic District =

Historic district in Queens, New York

- U.S. National Register of Historic Places
- U.S. Historic district
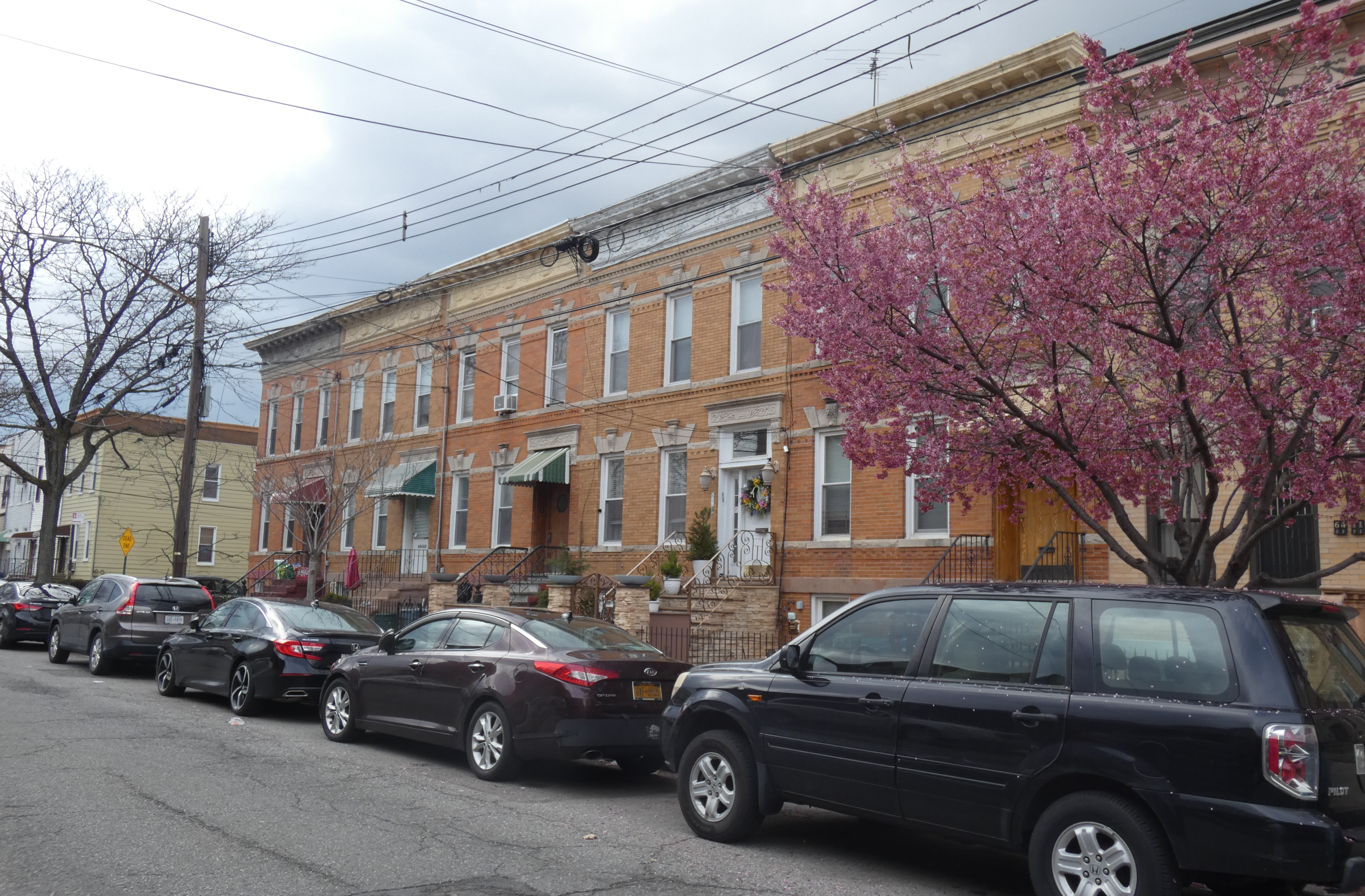
- Houses in the historic district

- Location within New York City
- Location: Roughly 64th Pl. from Catalpa Ave. to 68th Ave. from 64th St. to 65th St., New York, New York
- Coordinates: 40°42′20″N 73°53′40″W
- Area: 3.5 acres (1.4 ha)
- Built: 1909
- Architect: Groesch, Charles; Berger, Louis
- Architectural style: Renaissance, Romanesque
- MPS: Ridgewood MRA
- NRHP reference No.: 83001763
- Added to NRHP: September 30, 1983

68th Avenue–64th Place Historic District is a national historic district in Ridgewood, Queens, New York. It includes 46 contributing buildings built between 1909 and 1913. They consist mainly of two story brick row houses with one apartment per floor. Buildings feature alternating yellow, amber, brown and burnt orange speckled brick and cast stone detailing in the Romanesque Revival style.

It was listed on the National Register of Historic Places in 1983.
