= Fresh Pond–Traffic Historic District =

Historic district in Queens, New York

- U.S. National Register of Historic Places
- U.S. Historic district
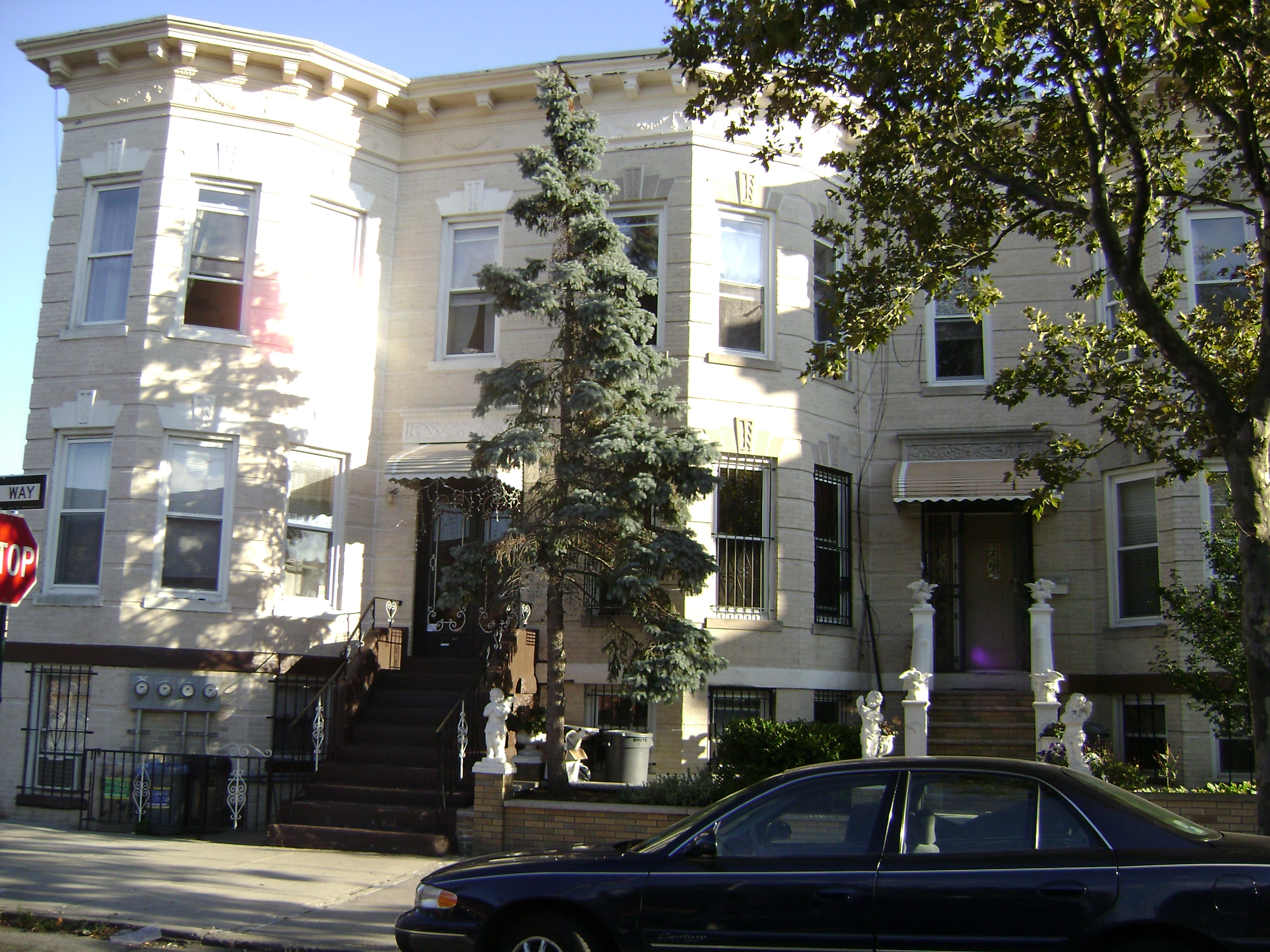

- Location within New York City Location within New York Location within the United States
- Location: Buildings on Linden, Gates, and Palmetto Aves, roughly bounded by Fresh Pond Rd., Traffic Ave., Woodbine and Linden Sts., New York, New York
- Coordinates: 40°42′34″N 73°53′49″W
- Area: 14 acres (5.7 ha)
- Built: 1917
- Architect: Bauer & Stier, Inc.; Berger, Louis
- Architectural style: Renaissance, Romanesque
- MPS: Ridgewood MRA
- NRHP reference No.: 83001770
- Added to NRHP: September 30, 1983

Fresh Pond–Traffic Historic District is a national historic district in Ridgewood, Queens, New York. It includes 197 contributing buildings built between 1914 and 1921. They consist mainly of brick two-story row houses with one apartment per floor. They have flat or rounded fronts with cream colored or amber, iron spot brick.

The district includes the following addresses:

- Linden Street
  - 61-11 to 61-57
  - 61-12 to 61-64
- Gates Avenue
  - 61-09 to 61-59
  - 61-12 to 61-60
  - 64-01 to 64-07
  - 64-02 to 64-18
- Palmetto Street
  - 61-11 to 61-55
  - 61-12 to 61-54
  - 64-01 to 64-33
  - 64-02 to 64-42

It was listed on the National Register of Historic Places in 1983.
