= Arbitration Rock =

1769 United States town boundary marker

Coordinates: 40°42′38.5″N 73°55′10.4″W

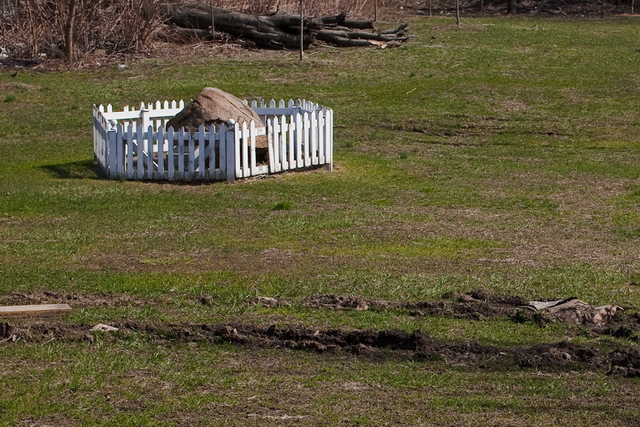
The Arbitration Rock

The Arbitration Rock was set in 1769 as the boundary marker between the two Long Island townships of Newtown and Bushwick. Since Newtown was in Queens County (now the New York City borough of Queens) and Bushwick in Kings County (now the borough of Brooklyn), this rock the size of a Volkswagen Beetle also served to mark the dividing line between these two colonial New York counties.

== Background ==
An acrimonious dispute over the boundary lines between the two townships had started as far back as 1661. “The feeling ran so high that men of one community would stone those of another." To a large extent, the dispute reflected the conflict between the original Dutch settlers of Bushwick with the burgeoning English colonists of Newtown, New York.

In 1768, "a bill was passed in the legislature for a commission to draw a line to designate the boundary between the two townships." In 1769, the borderline between the two towns and counties was established measured from this large rock that would ultimately be referred to as the "Arbitration Rock". Still the dispute was not settled until 1880, when the state sent surveyors to verify the point on the old rock made in 1661.

Through the 19th century, Arbitration Rock was the official marker for property disputes and all property lines were measured from its center including the border of the New York City borough of Brooklyn (coterminous with Kings County of New York State). In 1898, the two towns were absorbed into a consolidated City of New York. The rock was of diminishing importance after that and by 1917, it was nearly covered with earth and debris.

New York City subsequently redrew the Brooklyn–Queens boundary in 1925 to resolve problems caused by the ruler straight Brooklyn–Queens borderline that was running through the middle of houses. Some people had kitchens in Queens and living rooms in Brooklyn, in addition to facing confusion about voting and tax rates. A grid plan was imposed on the two boroughs and the rock became redundant.

The redrawn boundaries placed the almost forgotten rock well inside Queens. With its purpose made obsolete, the rock's honored and quiet existence faded away. Street improvements made to Onderdonk Avenue in the 1930s where it had lain for more than 10,000 years caused the glacial boulder to become buried below the surface. Its location was forgotten and the Arbitration Rock assumed the existence of a myth.

Interest in the rock as historically important began to grow in the 1990s. After a seven-year archaeological hunt, a huge crane dug deep into the ground and hoisted the massive rock out of the earth from its buried location under Onderdonk Avenue west of Flushing Avenue, bringing it to the surface after some seventy years of burial. This was done in December 2001 and it was moved several hundred feet to the 18th century Vander Ende-Onderdonk House.

Even after 340 years, the Arbitration Rock continued to hold its central placement in disputes between Queens and Brooklyn. Once Queens had located and moved the rock to its new location with a ceremony marking its restored hallowed place in history, Brooklyn officials quickly protested. They argued that as it was part of their joint heritage, they should have been included in the decision on its placement.

The official Queens historian replied that it belonged "in Queens, of course. While it was once on the border, the boulder has been in Queens for 77 years, since the boundaries were redrawn."

Taking a Solomon-like approach, he said only half-joking, "it should be cut in half and the other half should be a monument in Brooklyn."
