= Cypress Avenue East Historic District =

Historic district in Queens, New York

- U.S. National Register of Historic Places
- U.S. Historic district
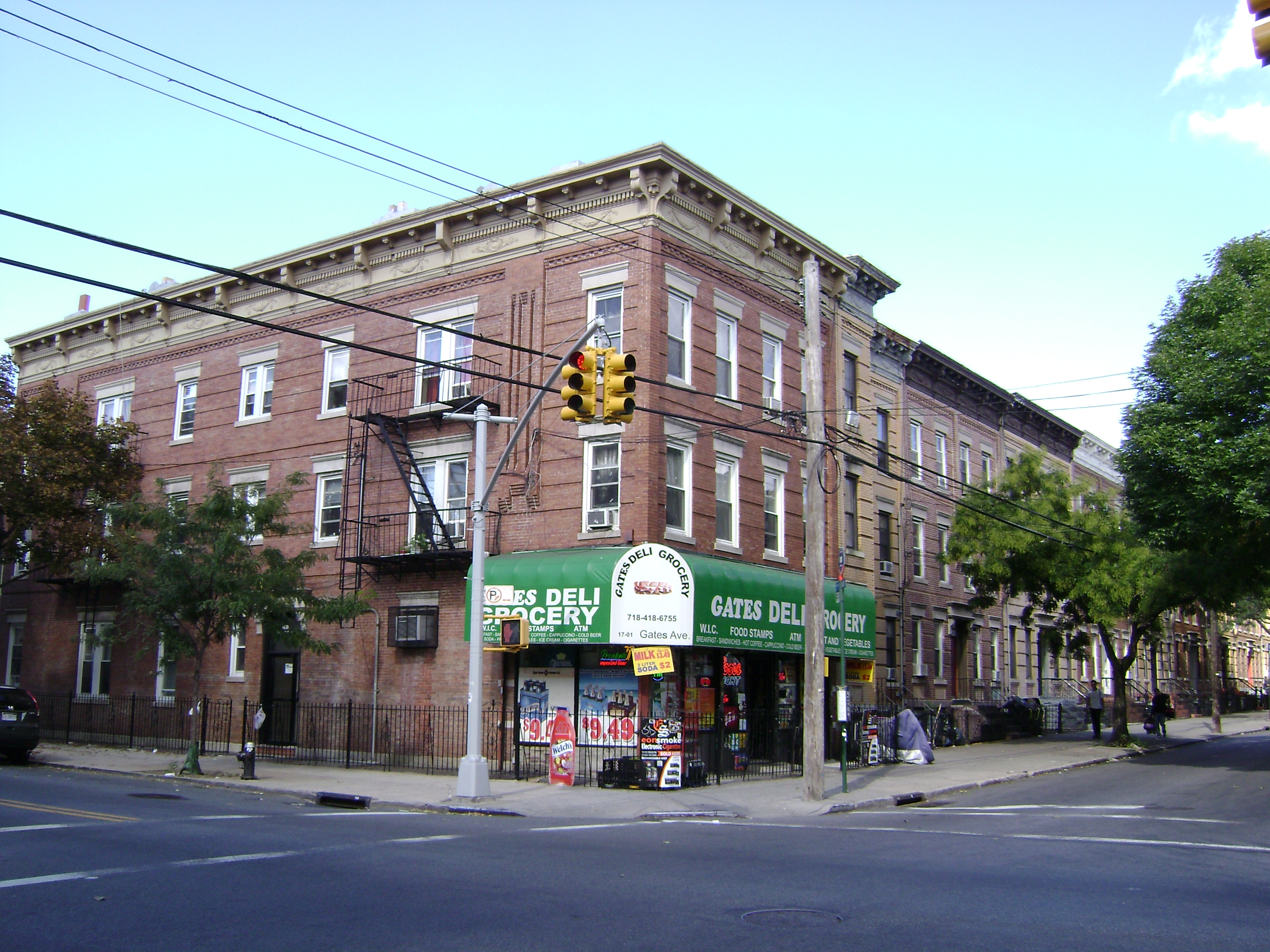

- Location within New York City Location within New York Location within the United States
- Location: Roughly bounded by Linden and Cornelia Sts., Seneca and St. Nicholas Aves., New York, New York
- Coordinates: 40°42′6″N 73°54′31″W
- Area: 26 acres (11 ha)
- Built: 1900
- Architect: Berger, Louis; Bauer & Stier
- Architectural style: Mathews Flats
- MPS: Ridgewood MRA
- NRHP reference No.: 83001767
- Added to NRHP: September 30, 1983

Cypress Avenue East Historic District is a national historic district in Ridgewood, Queens, New York. It includes 247 contributing buildings built between 1900 and 1914. They consist mainly of three story tenements with two apartments per floor. They feature alternating facades of light and dark speckled brick.

The district boundaries were drawn to exclude commercial and frame construction buildings, and include the following addresses:

- Linden Street
  - 16-66 to 16-92
  - 17-02 to 17-40
- Cypress Avenue
  - 654, 664
- Gates Avenue
  - 16-73 to 16-91
  - 16-74 to 16-94
  - 17-01 to 17-21
  - 17-02 to 17-22
- Palmetto Street
  - 16-63 to 16-83
  - 17-01 to 17-21
  - 17-02 to 17-22
- Woodbine Street
  - 16-61 to 16-83
  - 16-62 to 16-84
  - 17-01 to 17-21
  - 17-02 to 17-26
- Seneca Avenue
  - 652 to 668
  - 784 to 790
  - 802 to 816
- Madison Street
  - 17-01 to 17-25
  - 17-10 to 17-28
- Cornelia Street
  - 17-19 to 17-33

The district was listed on the National Register of Historic Places in 1983.
