= Cypress Avenue West Historic District =

Historic district in Queens, New York

- U.S. National Register of Historic Places
- U.S. Historic district
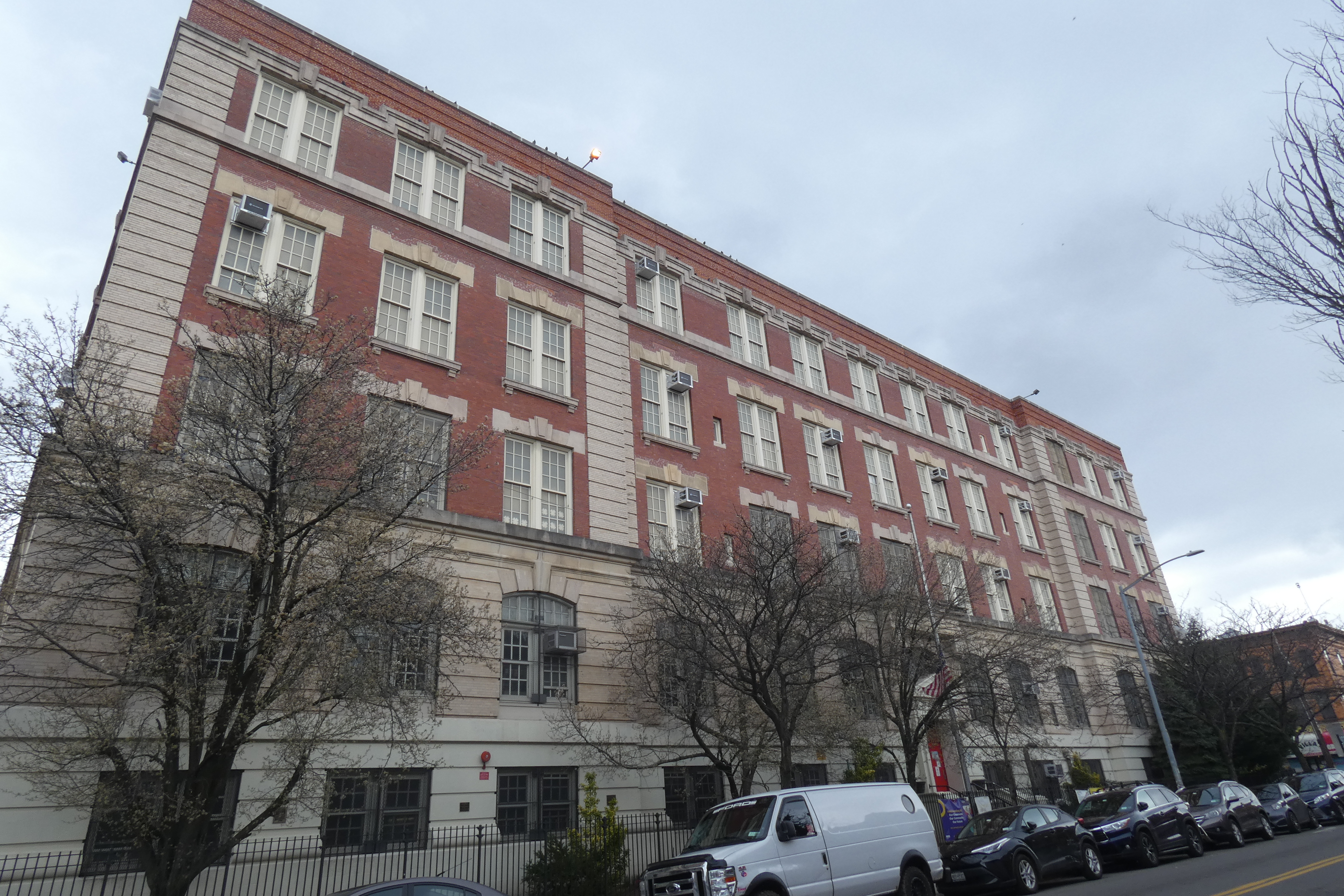
- PS 81 in the historic district

- Location within New York City Location within New York Location within the United States
- Location: Roughly bounded by St. Nicholas and Seneca Aves., Linden and Stockholm Sts., New York, New York
- Coordinates: 40°42′15″N 73°54′45″W
- Area: 36.5 acres (14.8 ha)
- Built: 1888
- Architect: Berger, Louis, & Co.; multiple
- Architectural style: Renaissance, Romanesque, Romanesque Revival
- MPS: Ridgewood MRA
- NRHP reference No.: 83001768
- Added to NRHP: September 30, 1983

Cypress Avenue West Historic District is a national historic district in Ridgewood, Queens, New York. It includes 440 contributing buildings built between 1888 and 1906. They consist mainly of brick two and three story row houses with one apartment per floor and three story tenements with two apartments per floor. Also included in the district is Public School #81, St. John's Ridgewood United Methodist Church, and a row of commercial buildings. They feature Romanesque Revival style applied detailing.

It was listed on the National Register of Historic Places in 1983.
