= Elmhurst, Queens =

Neighborhood in New York City

Elmhurst
- Neighborhood of Queens
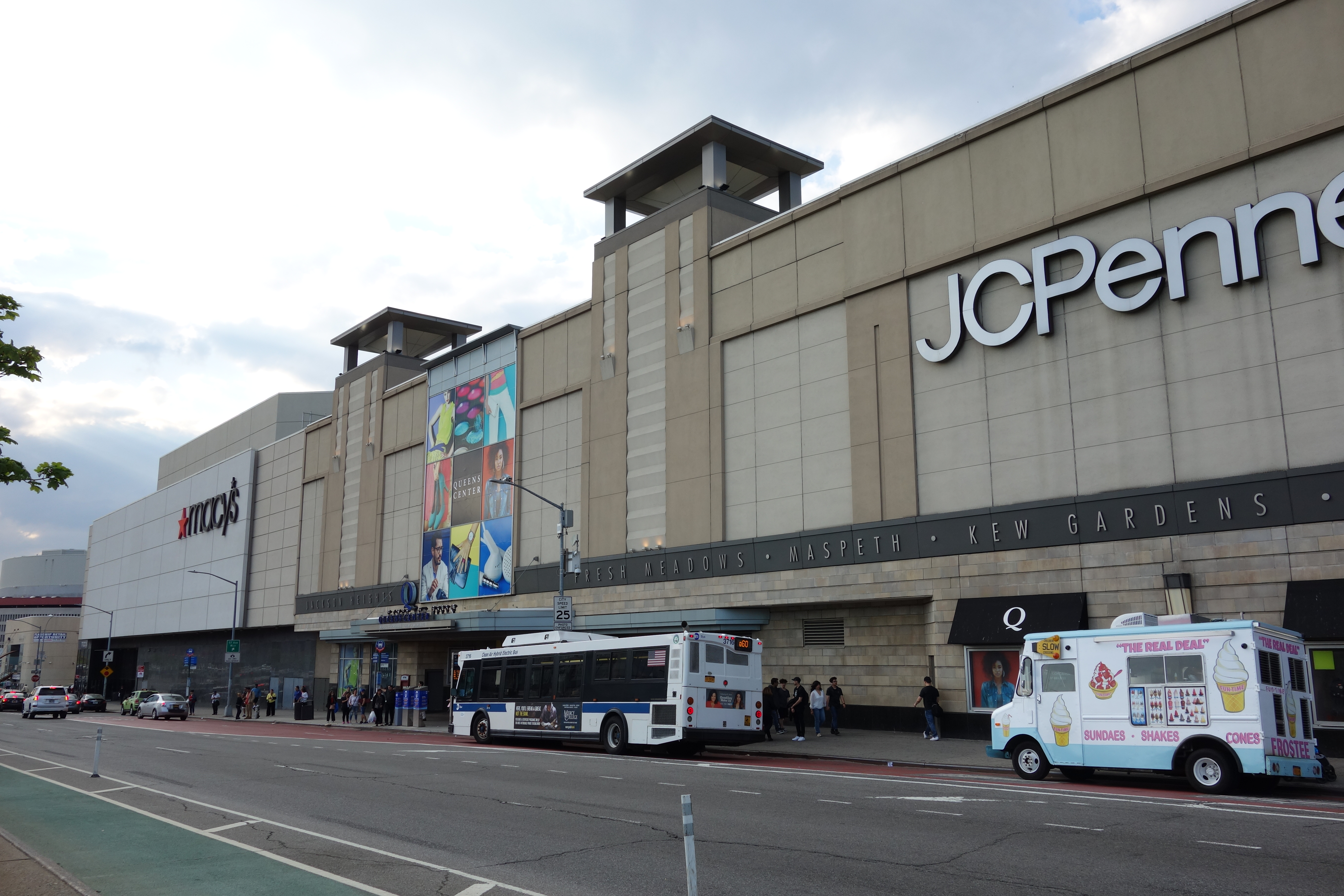
- Queens Center Mall in Elmhurst
- Location within New York City
- Coordinates: 40.74°N 73.88°W
- Country: United States
- State: New York
- City: New York City
- Borough: Queens
- Community District: Queens 4
- Settlement (Dutch): 1652

Area
  - Total: 1.172 sq mi (3.036 km^{2})

Population (2010)
  - Total: 88,427
  - Density: 75,440/sq mi (29,130/km^{2})

Race/Ethnicity
  - Hispanic: 46.1%
  - Asian: 43.8%
  - White: 6.6%
  - Black: 1.3%
  - Other/Multiracial: 2.2%
- Time zone: UTC−5 (EST)
  - Summer (DST): UTC−4 (EDT)
- ZIP Code: 11373
- Area codes: 718, 347, 929, and 917
- Website: www.elmhurst.nyc

Elmhurst (formerly Newtown) is a neighborhood in the borough of Queens in New York City. It is bounded by Roosevelt Avenue on the north; the Long Island Expressway on the south; Junction Boulevard on the east; and the New York Connecting Railroad on the west.

The village, originally named Middleburgh, was established in 1652 by English Puritans, approximately 7 miles (11 km) from New Amsterdam. When the British took over New Netherland in 1664, they renamed it New Town, which was eventually simplified to Newtown. It remained a rural community until the late 1890s, when it was renamed Elmhurst and became part of the City of Greater New York. Elmhurst became heavily developed with residential and commercial structures in the early 20th century, and many immigrants started moving in during the latter part of the century. The neighborhood is known for its diverse international food scene, featuring Thai, Chinese, Tibetan, Vietnamese, Indonesian, Colombian, Argentine and more.

Elmhurst is located in Queens Community District 4 and its ZIP Code is 11373. It is patrolled by the New York City Police Department's 110th Precinct. Politically, Elmhurst is represented by the New York City Council's 25th District and small parts of the 21st, 24th, and 29th Districts.

== History ==
=== 17th and 18th centuries ===
The village was founded in 1652 in the Dutch colony of New Netherland (Nieuw Nederland) by English Puritans from Connecticut and Massachusetts. They named it Middelburgh ('Middleburgh') after the capital of the Dutch province of Zeeland, which had been a refuge of Puritans fleeing religious persecution in England. The village was located approximately 7 miles (11 km) from the growing city of New Amsterdam (Nieuw Amsterdam) and just east of the settlement at Maspat (now called Maspeth), which had been abandoned following threats and attacks by local Lenape Native Americans. When the British took over New Netherland in 1664, they renamed Middleburgh as Nieuwe Stad (New Town) to maintain a connection to its Dutch heritage. This was eventually simplified to Newtown. In a deed dated July 9, 1666, the settlers took title to the lands of Newtown from the Native American tribes.

A town building, near what is now Broadway and Corona Avenue, was erected to serve as both a community and religious building. Use of this building was shared by the different religious denominations in Middleburgh: the Church of England, the Dutch Reformed Church, the Presbyterians, and the Quakers. In 1669, the town planned a new church for all of these denominations, on a plot of land donated by Ralph Hunt near Grand Avenue and Queens Boulevard. According to the town records, the new building was to cost forty pounds, half in corn and half in cattle. The village of Newtown was established as the town seat for the township in 1683, when Queens County was reorganized as a "one county, five towns" model. The Town of Newtown, which had a town hall, jail, tax office, and town clerk's office, was the center of a municipality that comprised the villages that were located north of present-day Forest Park and west of Flushing Meadows.

By 1700, the town had a population of 1,000, including 405 youths under the age of sixteen, 434 adults, and 161 slaves. Among the English settlers in the present Elmhurst section of Newtown was Gershom Moore, who lived at what is now the intersection of Broadway, 45th Avenue, and Elmhurst Avenue. A chance seedling on his farm eventually produced the Newtown Pippin, Colonial America's most famous apple. The St. James Church was founded in 1704, followed by the Reformed Church of Newtown in 1731. The Colonel Bernardus Bloom Farmhouse at 90-11 56th Avenue, which existed from the 17th century to 2015, was one of the oldest surviving farmhouses in Newtown through the 21st century.

=== 19th century ===
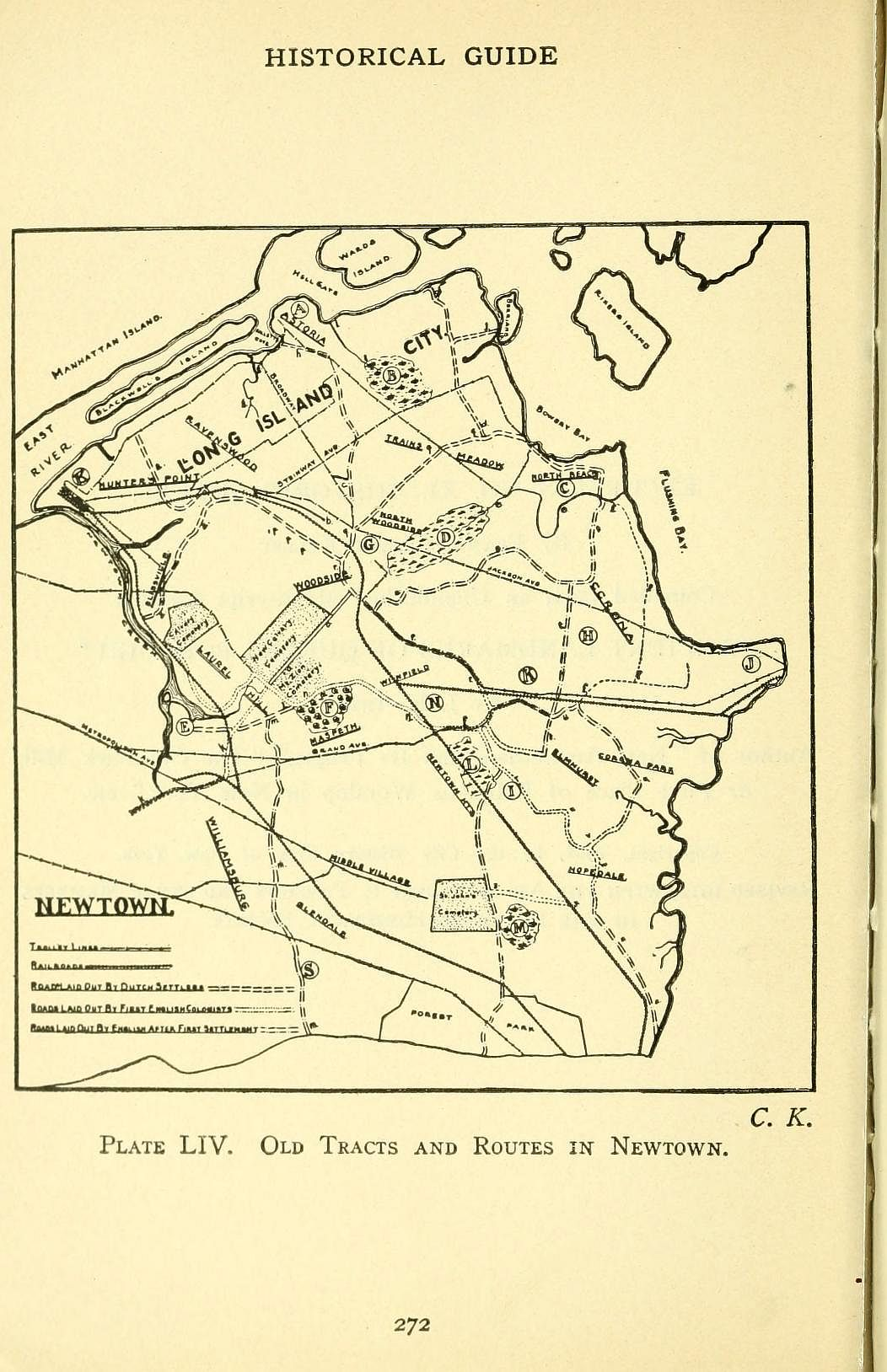
1910 map of old roads in New Town

Newtown was also the center of a population of free blacks and slaves by the early 19th century. With the program of gradual abolition and the manumission of some slaves by masters following the American Revolution, the free population increased. In 1828, a year after slavery in New York state was finally abolished under the terms of a 1799 gradual abolition law, landowner James Hunter and his wife deeded 2 acres (0.81 ha) to the community for a church and parsonage. They had already been using land at Corona Avenue and 90th Street as a burial ground since about 1818. This was associated with the United African Society of Newtown, by 1906 known as St. Mark's A.M.E. Church. By 1886, more than 300 burials had been made in the cemetery. The church moved further east and gradually the burial ground was forgotten until the remains of a woman were discovered in an iron coffin in 2011 during development. The church is hoping to buy the land for preservation.

More concentrated residential development in the area was spurred by the completion of a horsecar line, the Grand Street Line, which reached New Town in 1854. The Long Island Rail Road's Main Line was built through Newtown in 1876, attracting more residents to the neighborhood.

=== Renaming and incorporation into city ===
Cord Meyer bought land at Broadway and Whitney Avenue in 1896. He proposed that the town be renamed "Elmhurst", meaning "a grove of elms"; in 1897, one year before Queens County was incorporated in the Greater City of New York, the town was renamed. The renaming was done partially to disassociate the town from nearby Maspeth and the smelly, polluted Newtown Creek, and partially to celebrate the elm trees (Ulmus americana) that abounded in the area.

Elmhurst developed as a fashionable district due to a housing development built by the Cord Meyer Development Company between 1896 and 1910, north of the Port Washington Branch railroad station. Cord Meyer expanded its holdings between 1905 and 1930, including Elmhurst Square, Elmhurst South, Elmhurst Heights, and New Elmhurst. Elmhurst also was the site of the Grand Street LIRR station just west of the current Grand Avenue – Newtown subway station. The Grand Street LIRR station was served by the Main Line and the former Rockaway Beach Branch. In the 1930s, the Independent Subway System's Queens Boulevard line was built through the neighborhood, spurring economic development but also destroying many old buildings.

Prior to World War II, Elmhurst had become an almost exclusively Jewish and Italian neighborhood, made up of early 20th century immigrants and their descendants. Following the war, Elmhurst evolved into what has been considered one of the most ethnically diverse neighborhoods in New York City, as immigrants arrived from new areas. By the 1980s, there were persons from 112 nations in residence in the neighborhood, which has continued to diversify since then. Among the most numerous ethnic groups that have settled in the area are Latinos and Chinese Americans.

For many years, the Elmhurst gas tanks, a pair of large natural gas storage structures built in 1910 and 1921 on 57th Avenue between 74th and 80th Streets, were well-known landmarks, standing 200 feet (61 m) high. Because the Long Island Expressway frequently became congested in that area, "backup at the Elmhurst Gas Tanks" became a familiar phrase in radio traffic reporting. The gas storage facilities were removed in 2001. The site was redeveloped and opened as Elmhurst Park in 2011.

== Land use ==
Elmhurst contains a variety of zoning districts, including manufacturing, commercial, residential, and mixed-use. Much of the neighborhood is composed of detached or multi-family houses, though there are also rowhouse districts, apartment buildings of up to six or seven stories, and large developments such as LeFrak City. Commercial overlays are located primarily along Queens Boulevard, Broadway, and Grand and Corona Avenues. Several tracts are also zoned for shopping centers, which are occupied by Elmhurst's malls. Light-manufacturing zones are located near the western end of the neighborhood, mainly between the LIRR's Port Washington Branch and 51st Avenue.

=== Official landmarks ===
Some buildings in Elmhurst are listed on the National Register of Historic Places (NRHP) and/or are designated New York City Landmarks (NYCL):

- Benevolent and Protective Order of Elks, Lodge Number 878 (NRHP, NYCL), built in 1923–1924, once the largest Elks lodge in the Eastern United States
- First Presbyterian Church of Newtown (NRHP), built in 1895
- Newtown High School (NYCL), a Flemish Renaissance Revival-style building erected in 1921 and expanded in 1931
- Reformed Church of Newtown (NRHP, NYCL), one of the oldest wood churches in New York City, first established by Dutch immigrants in 1731
- St. James Church (NRHP, NYCL), built in 1735 and the oldest surviving Anglican building in the city

The Elmhurst branch of the Jamaica Savings Bank was previously a New York City Landmark, but the designation was removed in 2005.

== Demographics ==
Based on data from the 2022 census, the population of Elmhurst was 160,534, an increase of 72,107 from the 88,427 counted in 2010. Covering an area of 750.28 acres (303.63 ha), the neighborhood had a population density of 117.9 inhabitants per acre (75,500/sq mi; 29,100/km^{2}).

The racial makeup of the neighborhood was 6.7% White, 8.1% African American, 0.2% (133) Native American, 33.8% Asian, 0.0% (28) Pacific Islander, 0.4% (338) from other races, and 1.6% (1,423) from two or more races. Hispanic or Latino of any race were 49.6% of the population. Elmhurst's Latino population is 20.4% South American (9.8% Ecuadorean, 7.2% Colombian, 1.8% Peruvian, 0.4% Argentinean, 0.4% Bolivian, 0.2% Chilean, 0.2% Venezuelan), 11.6% Mexican, 3.1% Dominican, 1.8% Puerto Rican, 1.5% Central American (0.5% Salvadoran, 0.4% Guatemalan, 0.3% Honduran), and 0.7% Cuban.

The entirety of Community Board 4, which comprises Elmhurst and Corona, had 135,972 inhabitants as of NYC Health's 2018 Community Health Profile, with an average life expectancy of 85.4 years. This is higher than the median life expectancy of 81.2 for all New York City neighborhoods. Most inhabitants are middle-aged adults and youth: 17% are between the ages of 0 and 17, 39% between 25 and 44, and 24% between 45 and 64. The ratio of college-aged and elderly residents was lower, at 8% and 12% respectively.

As of 2022, the median household income in Community Board 4 was $66,480. In 2022, an estimated 17.9% of Elmhurst and Corona residents lived in poverty, compared to 19% in all of Queens and 20% in all of New York City. One in fourteen residents (7%) were unemployed, compared to 8% in Queens and 9% in New York City. Rent burden, or the percentage of residents who have difficulty paying their rent, is 62% in Elmhurst and Corona, higher than the boroughwide and citywide rates of 53% and 51% respectively.

As of the 2020 census data from New York City Department of City Planning, Elmhurst is primarily populated by 55,800 Asian residents and 42,600 Hispanic residents, however there were between 5,000 to 9,999 White residents and less than 5,000 Black residents.

=== Chinese enclave ===
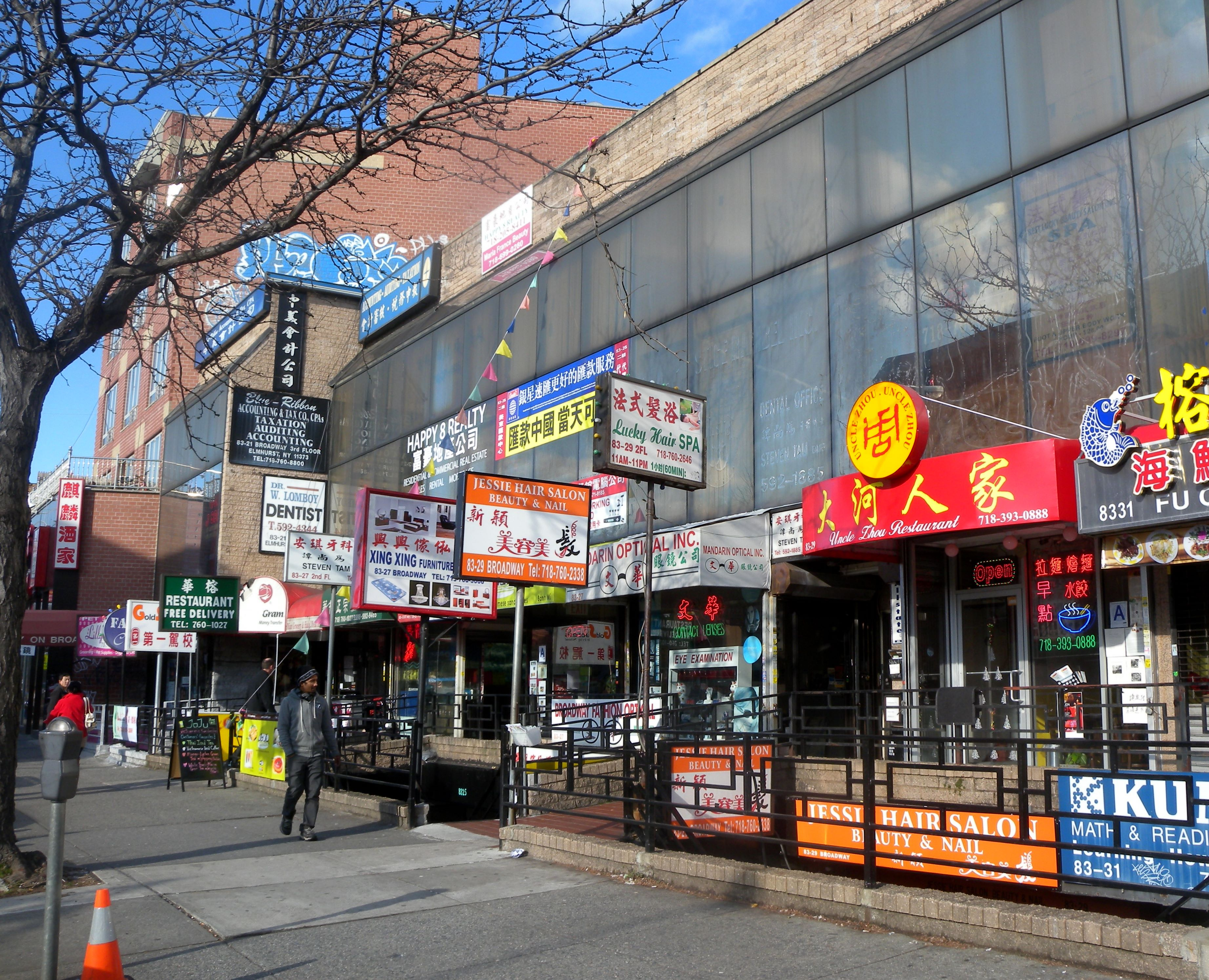
Elmhurst's Chinatown on Broadway, a satellite of the Flushing Chinatown

Elmhurst's growing Chinatown is the second largest in Queens, the other Chinatown being located in Flushing. Previously a small area with Chinese shops on Broadway between 81st Street and Cornish Avenue, this newly evolved second Chinatown in Queens has now expanded to 45th Avenue and Whitney Avenue and is developing as a satellite of the Flushing Chinatown.

There are also many other Southeast Asian businesses and shops in the area, including Malaysian Chinese, Singaporean Chinese, Indonesian, Thai, and Vietnamese. Hong Kong Supermarket and New York Supermarket serve as the largest Chinese supermarkets selling different food varieties to the Elmhurst Chinatown. The Cathay Bank serves as the only Chinese bank and the main financial resource business for the growing enclave, though USA HSBC, Chase, and other banks also are located in Elmhurst along Broadway. Like Flushing's Chinatown, it is also very highly populated by Mandarin speakers, although many also speak other varieties of Chinese.

Since the 2000s, Elmhurst Chinatown has expanded to the nearby neighborhood of Corona, Queens.

== Police and crime ==
Elmhurst and Corona are patrolled by the 110th Precinct of the NYPD, located at 94-41 43rd Avenue. The 110th Precinct ranked 15th safest out of 69 patrol areas for per-capita crime in 2010. As of 2018, with a non-fatal assault rate of 34 per 100,000 people, Corona and Elmhurst's rate of violent crimes per capita is less than that of the city as a whole. The incarceration rate of 227 per 100,000 people is lower than that of the city as a whole.

The 110th Precinct has a lower crime rate than in the 1990s, with crimes across all categories having decreased by 83.2% between 1990 and 2020. The precinct reported 4 murders, 29 rapes, 270 robberies, 359 felony assaults, 196 burglaries, 485 grand larcenies, and 138 grand larcenies auto in 2020.

== Fire safety ==
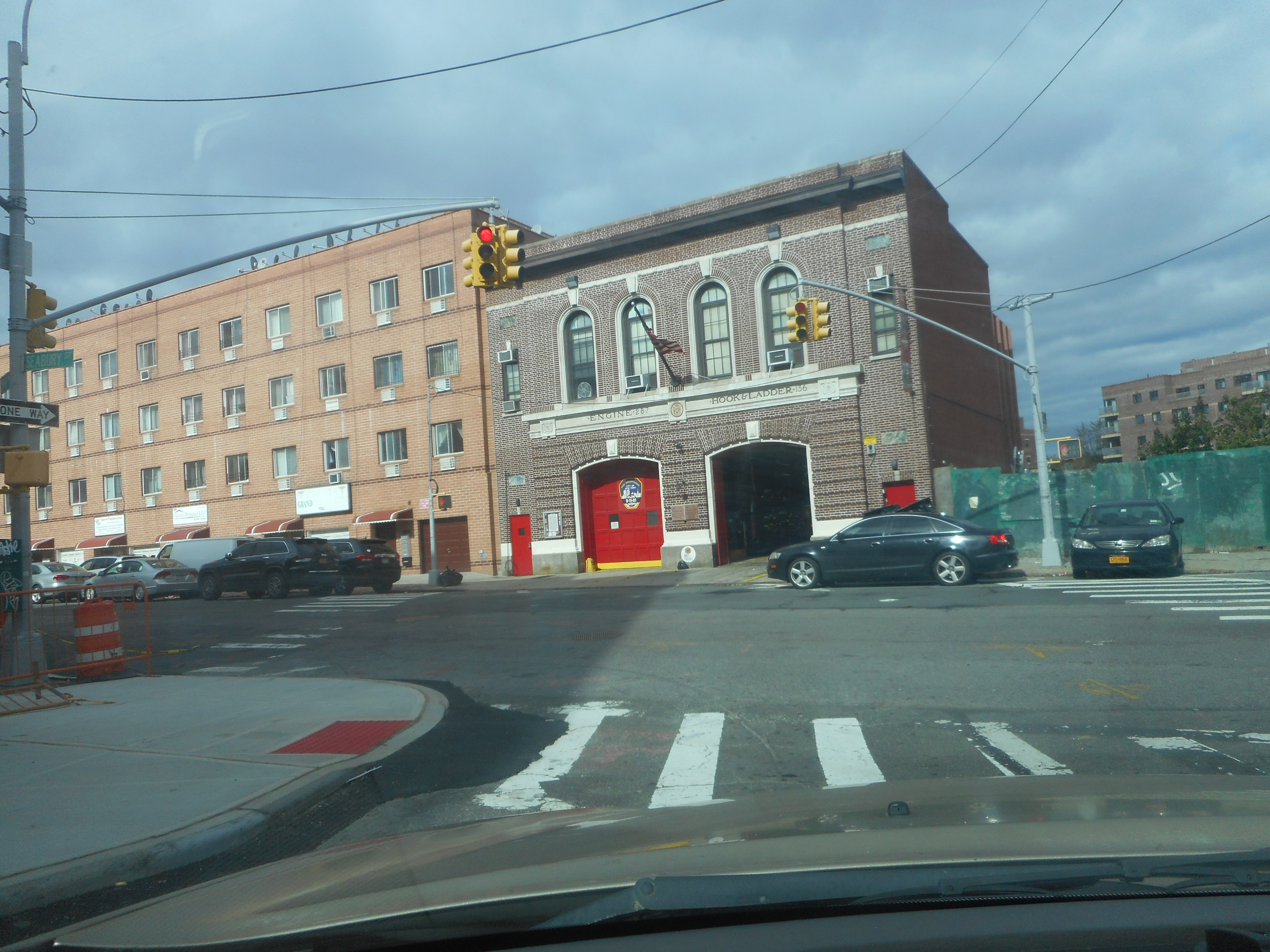
Engine Co. 287/Ladder Co. 136/Battalion 46, one of two fire stations in Elmhurst, both of which are part of the New York City Fire Department

Elmhurst is served by two New York City Fire Department (FDNY) fire stations:

- Engine Co. 287/Ladder Co. 136/Battalion 46 – 86-53 Grand Avenue
- Engine Co. 289/Ladder Co. 138 – 97-28 43rd Avenue

FDNY EMS Station 46 is located on the grounds of Elmhurst Hospital Center.

== Health ==
As of 2018, preterm births are less common in Elmhurst and Corona than in other places citywide, but births to teenage mothers are more common. In Elmhurst and Corona, there were 83 preterm births per 1,000 live births (compared to 87 per 1,000 citywide), and 25.8 births to teenage mothers per 1,000 live births (compared to 19.3 per 1,000 citywide). Elmhurst and Corona have a high population of residents who are uninsured. In 2018, this population of uninsured residents was estimated to be 25%, which is higher than the citywide rate of 12%.

The concentration of fine particulate matter, the deadliest type of air pollutant, in Elmhurst and Corona is 0.0077 milligrams per cubic metre (7.7×10^{−9} oz/ft^{3}), slightly higher than the city average. Fifteen percent of Elmhurst and Corona residents are smokers, which is equal to the city average of 14% of residents being smokers. In Elmhurst and Corona, 20% of residents are obese, 9% are diabetic, and 23% have high blood pressure—compared to the citywide averages of 20%, 14%, and 24% respectively. In addition, 24% of children are obese, compared to the citywide average of 20%.

Eighty-eight percent of residents eat some fruits and vegetables every day, which is about the same as the city's average of 87%. In 2018, 68% of residents described their health as "good", "very good", or "excellent", lower than the city's average of 78%. For every supermarket in Elmhurst and Corona, there are 16 bodegas.

The Elmhurst Hospital Center is located in Elmhurst.

=== Incidents ===
In March 2020, Elmhurst Hospital became the "center of the center" of the COVID-19 pandemic in New York state as the state itself experienced the most cases in COVID-19 pandemic. The neighborhoods of Corona, East Elmhurst, Elmhurst, and Jackson Heights were most affected by the pandemic in New York City. As of August 10, these communities, with a cumulative 303,494 residents, had recorded 12,954 COVID-19 cases and 1,178 deaths.

== Post office and ZIP Code ==
Elmhurst is covered by ZIP Code 11373. The United States Post Office operates two post offices in Elmhurst: the Elmhurst A Station at 80-27 Broadway and the Elmhurst Station at 59-01 Junction Boulevard.

== Religion ==
Places of worship include:

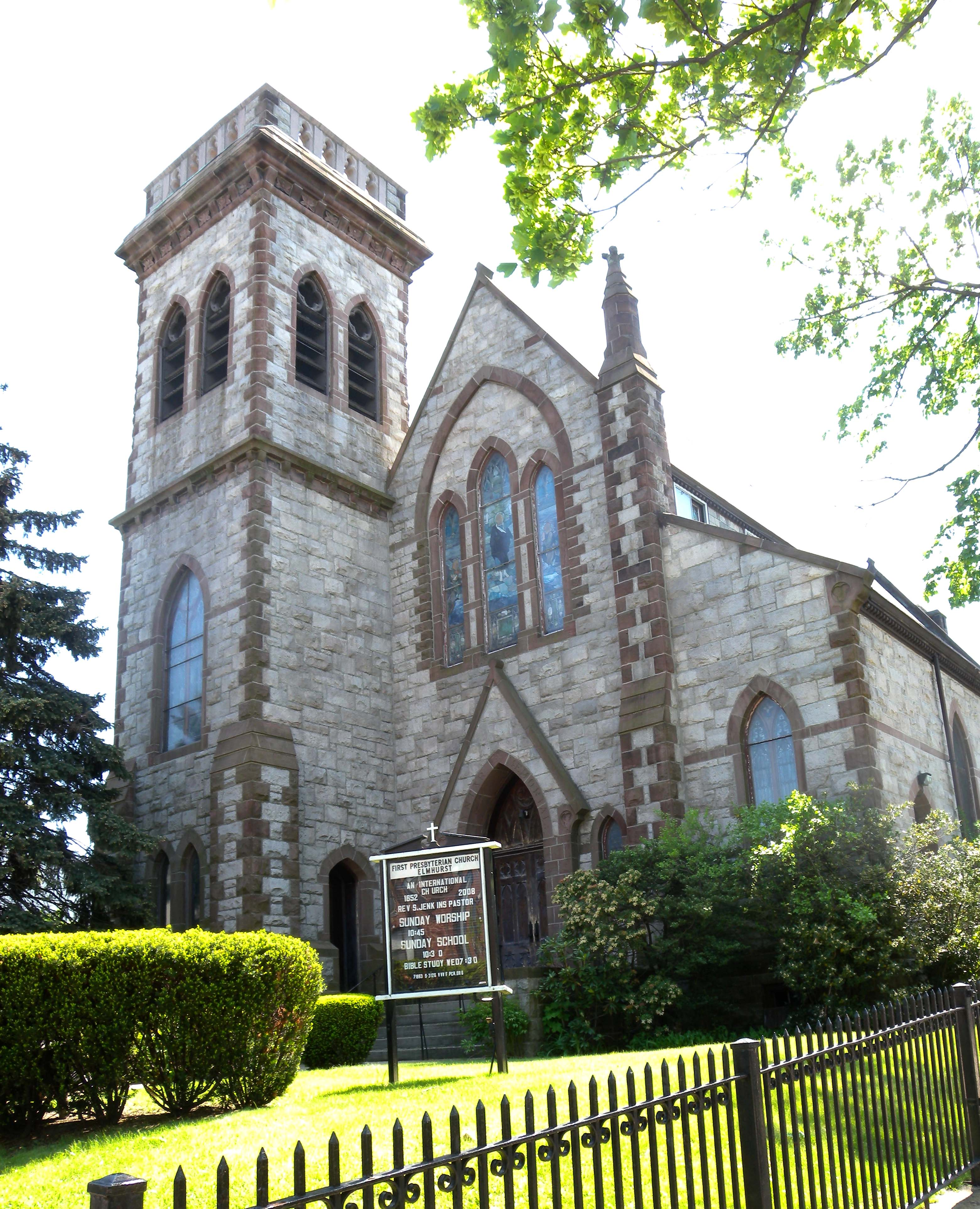
The First Presbyterian Church of Newtown on Queens Boulevard dates from 1652, though the building was erected in 1895.

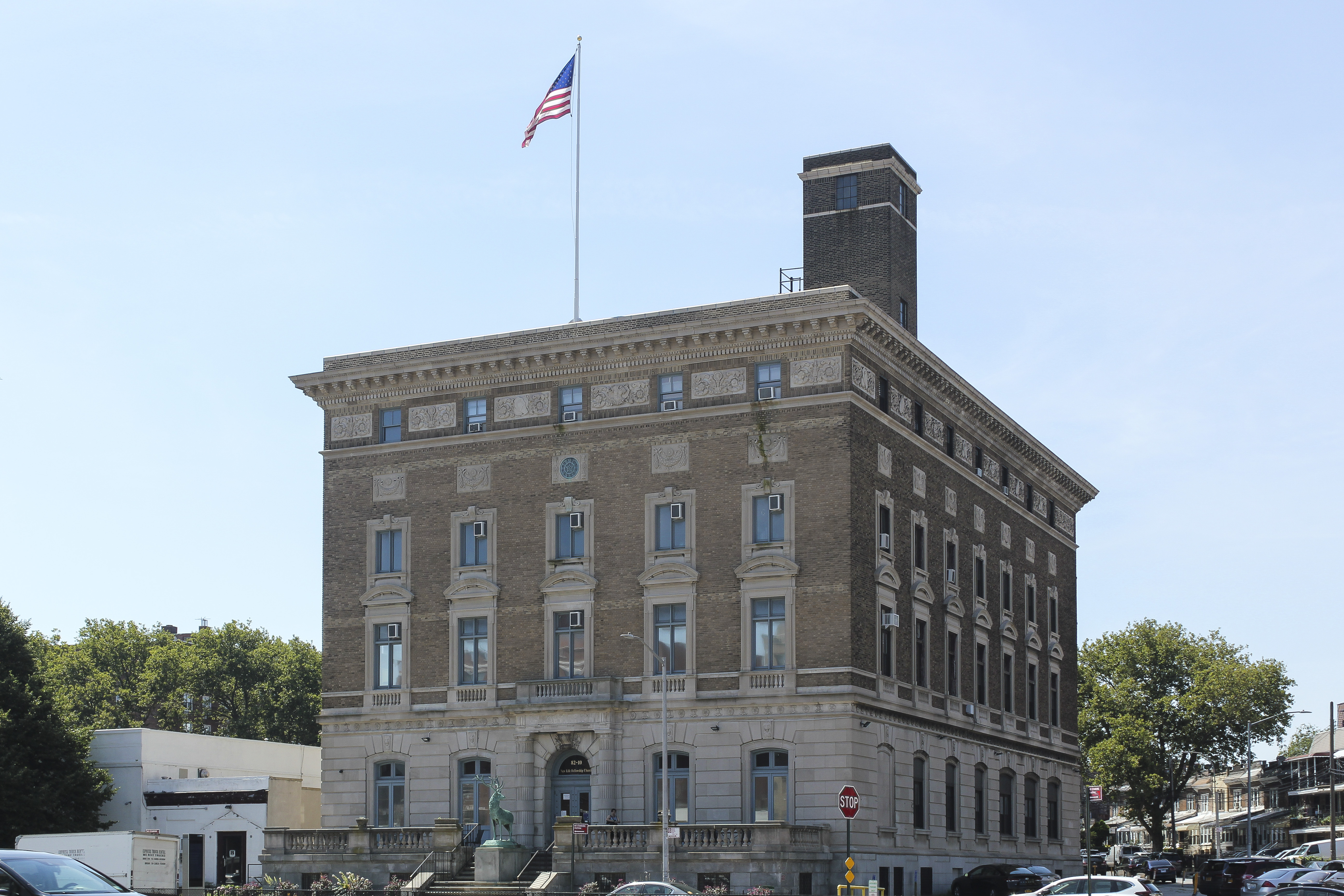
The Elks Lodge 878 building on Queens Boulevard is now the New Life Fellowship Church.

- Ascension Roman Catholic Church (86-13 55th Avenue)
- Bangladesh Hindu Mandir (94-39 44th Avenue)
- Christian Testimony Church (87-11 Whitney Avenue). Originally a synagogue—as evidenced by the former presence of the word Mizpah (watchtower) above the front door—the building is now a Christian church with a congregation composed mainly of Chinese people, with services in both English and Mandarin Chinese.
- Elmhurst Baptist Church (87-37 Whitney Avenue), founded in 1900, built in 1902. The congregation is very diverse and multi-ethnic. The church building is constructed of stone.
- Elmhurst Islamic Center (EIC) (87-07 55th Avenue)
- Elmhurst Muslim Center (42-12 79th Street)
- Masjid Al Taufiq (41-02 Forley St)
- First Presbyterian Church of Newtown (Queens Boulevard and 54th Avenue) built in 1895, the congregation was established in 1652
- Geeta Temple Asharam (92-09 Corona Avenue)
- Jain Center of America (43-11 Ithaca Street), founded in 1973
- New Life Fellowship Church (82-10 Queens Boulevard) is housed in the building of the Benevolent and Protective Order of Elks, Lodge Number 878.
- The Reformed Church of Newtown (85-15 Broadway), founded in 1731. The original church was built in 1733, with a replacement built in 1831, expanded in 1851, and fitted with stained glass by 1874. The church has a small, historic graveyard on the side facing Corona Avenue.
- The Rock Church at Elmwood Theatre (57-02 Hoffman Drive), at 57th Avenue and Hoffman Drive, is housed in the former Loews Elmwood Theater. The theater, built in 1928, was formerly one of the largest theaters in the city and currently seats 3,000 people. Its name was a portmanteau word, composed of the names "Elmhurst" and "Woodhaven", the latter alluding to nearby Woodhaven Boulevard. One of the city's last community theaters, it was considered for demolition in 1968 and in 1999; both times, the site was planned as an adjunct for the nearby, now-closed, St. John's Queens Hospital. The theater closed in 2002 and was purchased by the Rock Church, but was temporarily used as a music venue before the church opened in 2006. The theater has a water tower and a huge sign saying "Elmwood" on the roof.
- Satya Narayan Mandir (75-15 Woodside Avenue)
- St. Adalbert Roman Catholic Church (52-29 83rd Street), founded in 1892
- St. Bartholomew's Church (43-22 Ithaca Street), founded in 1906, present structure built in 1930. The original church, built in 1910, is at Whitney and 43rd Avenues.
- St. James Church (originally St. James Episcopal Church, at Broadway and 51st Avenue) is Elmhurst's oldest extant building, having been built in 1734 under the rule of British King George III. In 1848, it became a community center and Sunday school, upon which the church moved to a new building that later burned down. A clock tower atop the original building was destroyed in an 1882 storm. The original church building is now on the National Register of Historic Places.

== Malls ==
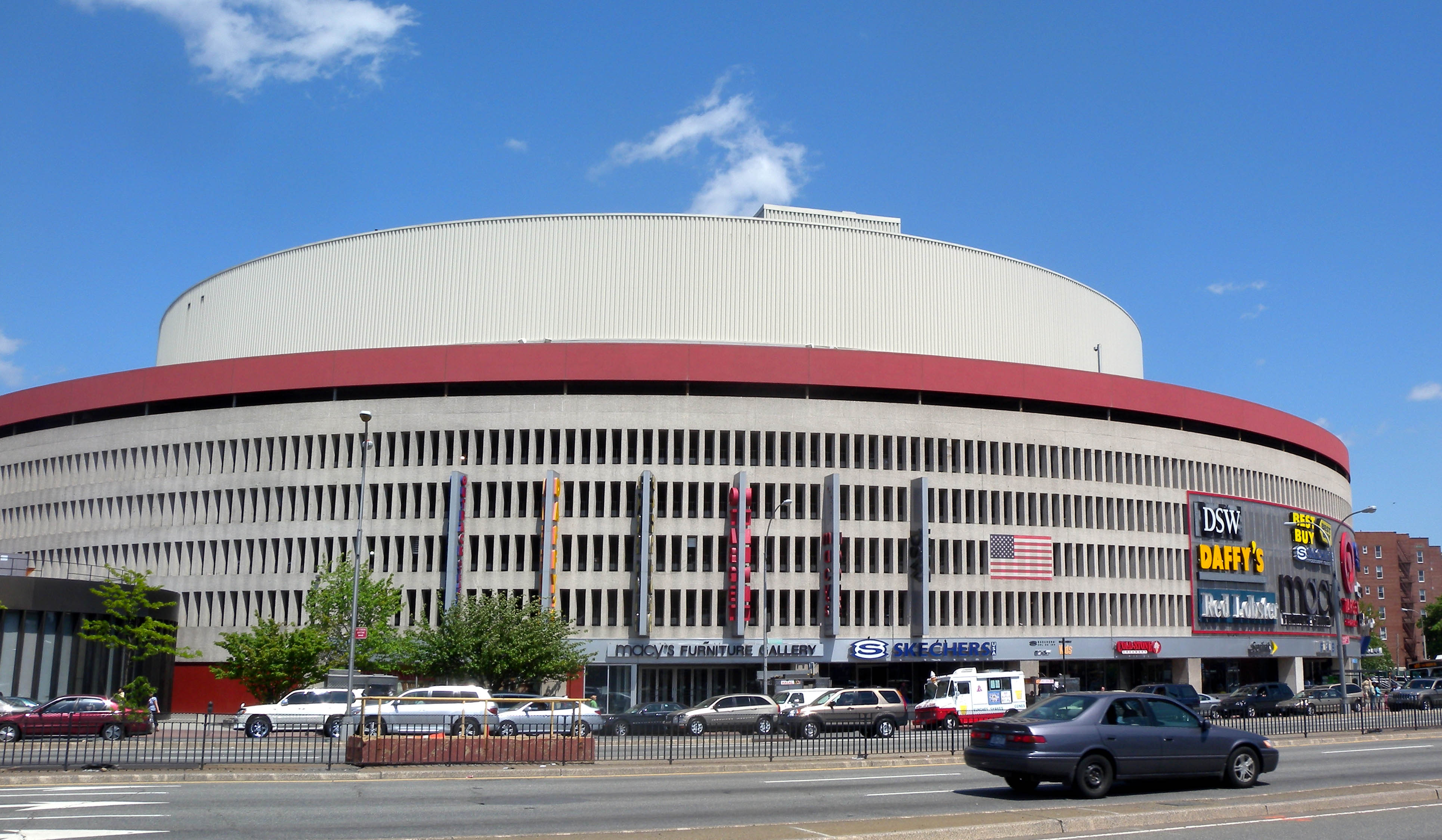
Side view of Queens Place from Queens Boulevard

Elmhurst has two urban shopping malls: Queens Center and the smaller Queens Place Mall.

The 150-store Queens Center, bounded by Queens Boulevard, 57th and 59th Avenues, and 90th and 94th Streets, opened on September 12, 1973, and was renovated and expanded across 92nd Street in 2002–4. With a gross leasable area of 1,000,000 square feet (93,000 m^{2}), the mall has had retail sales per square foot nearly triple the national average. It was built on land previously occupied by a 24-ride children's amusement park named Fairyland, which opened in 1949 and closed in 1968. The site was also formerly a supermarket and automobile parking.

The smaller Queens Place, bounded by Queens Boulevard and by Justice, 55th, and 56th Avenues, is designed in a cylindrical shape and opened in 1965. Originally planned as a traditional rectangular construction designed to replace several blocks of residences, the mall had to be redesigned because the owner of the corner house at 55th Avenue and Queens Boulevard, Mary Sendek, refused to sell what had been her childhood home. The site of the corner home was demolished after Sendek died, and that site is now a small collection of stores.

== Streets and street names ==
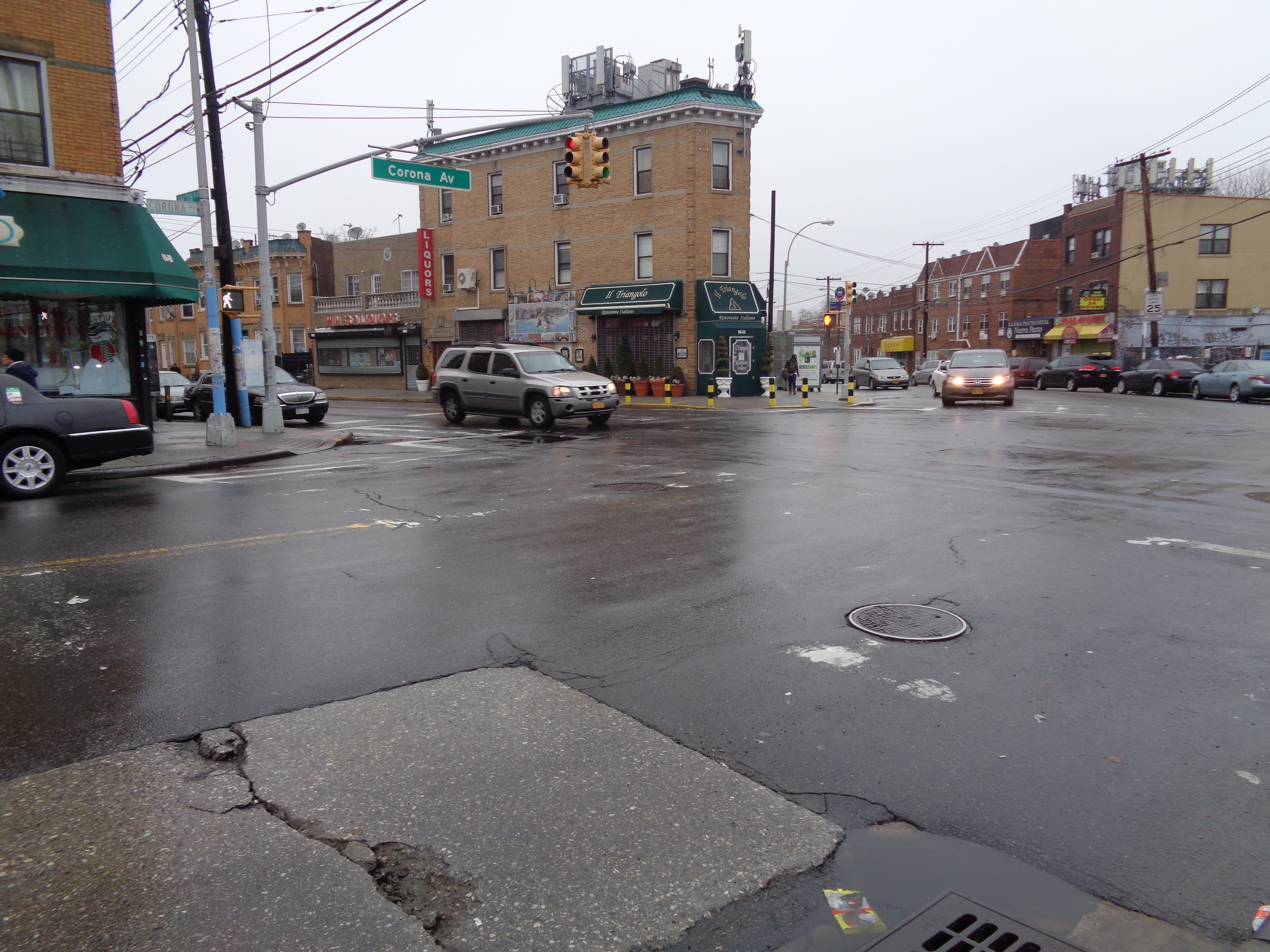
The intersection of Corona Avenue and Junction Boulevard in eastern Elmhurst

57th Avenue was known as the Flushing and Newtown Turnpike. Built in 1801, it connected with present-day Flushing Avenue in Maspeth, and extended all the way to Williamsburg, Brooklyn.

The Elks Lodge's name is shared by a local street, Elks Road, a short road in a cluster of 2- and 3-story orange and yellow brick buildings located between Grand Avenue, 79th Street, and Calamus Avenue, that were built in 1930 by Louis Allmendinger for the Matthews Company.

Hoffman Drive is a remnant of the wide Hoffman Boulevard. Hoffman Boulevard was straightened and renamed Queens Boulevard, but a short slip road, Hoffman Drive, leads from 57th Avenue to Woodhaven Boulevard.

Horace Harding Expressway was once a turnpike called Nassau Boulevard, which went from Elmhurst to Flushing, Bayside, and Little Neck. It was renamed for Horace J. Harding (1863–1929), a finance magnate who directed the New York, New Haven and Hartford Railroad and the New York Municipal Railways System; Harding encouraged city planner Robert Moses's system of parkways on New York, and after Harding died, the boulevard—now the service road of the Long Island Expressway—was renamed after him.

Horse Brook Island is a traffic island at the intersection of 90th Street, Justice Avenue, and 56th Avenue. The traffic island is reminiscent of the former Horse Brook, a creek that flowed to the Flushing River from the present-day intersection of Kneeland Avenue and Codwise Place. The space was renovated from 1986 to 1994.

Justice Avenue, an Elmhurst road that has existed since the American colonial period, follows an unusual curved path through Elmhurst due to a now-defunct railroad line immediately to the south. Its name relates to the former Newtown Town Hall that stood at the intersection of Justice Avenue and Broadway.

Queens Boulevard, a wide at-grade highway that stretches from Long Island City to Jamaica, was formerly composed of two small dirt roads: Old Jamaica Road and Hoffman Boulevard. In the 1910s, it was paved and widened to 12 lanes. It is sometimes called the "Boulevard of Death" because of the high fatality rate on Queens Boulevard.

The majority of Whitney Avenue, which stretches from 83rd Street in the west to Roosevelt Avenue and 93rd Street to the northeast, is on a tilted street grid, developed in the early 20th century. The street grid consists of Broadway; Aske, Benham, Case, Denman, Elbertson, Forley, Gleane, Hampton, Ithaca, Judge, Ketcham, Layton, Macnish Streets; Ketcham Place; and Baxter, Pettit, Britton, Vietor, Elmhurst, Whitney, and Lamont Avenues. Whitney Avenue also has the most religious institutions of any street in Elmhurst.

Woodhaven Boulevard was known as Trotting Course Lane because it was named when horses were the main mode of transport. Although it extends to Cross Bay Boulevard in the Rockaways, two small parts of the original lane still exist in Forest Hills.

== Parks ==
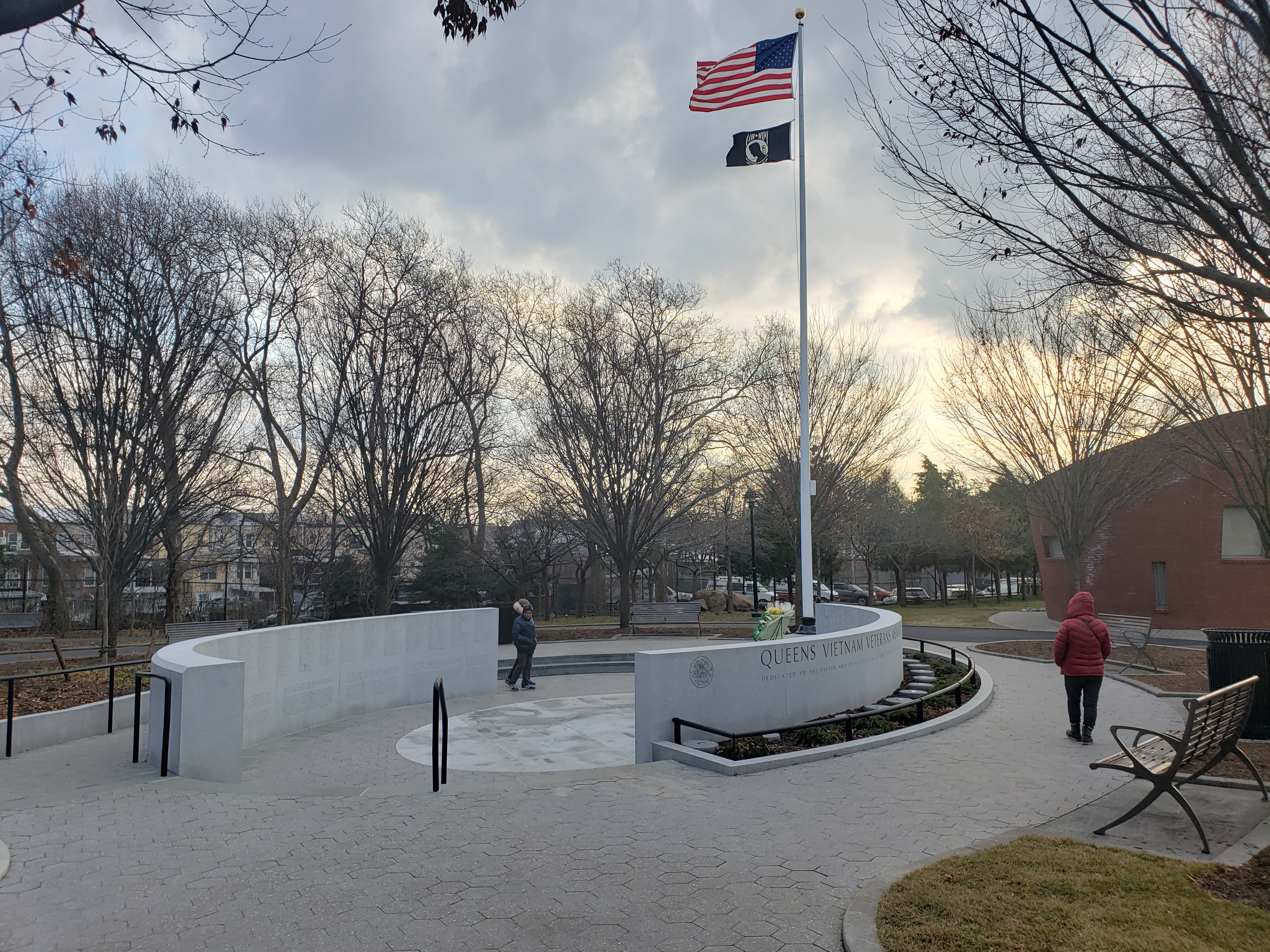
Queens Vietnam Veterans Memorial in Elmhurst Park

Elmhurst Park is on 57th Avenue west of 80th Street. There is a children's playground with slides, swings, and exercise machines, as well as walking paths and a lawn atop a hill. The land for the park was formerly occupied by gas tanks. The park itself was opened in 2011. It includes the Queens Vietnam Veterans Memorial, which was finished in 2019.

Moore Homestead Park is located between Broadway and 45th Avenue. There is a children's playground with slides and swings and there are different sections where people can play basketball, handball, and chess. The park is named after a nearby homestead owned by Clement Clarke Moore, whose ancestor John Moore helped negotiate Newtown's land area with the Native American population there. The park, originally acquired by the Independent Subway System and then turned into a playground, was renovated in the 1990s, and again in the 2020s.

Frank D. O'Connor Playground is located on Broadway between Woodside Avenue and 78th Street. There is also a children playground, basketball and handball area. Opened in 1937 and renovated in 1996, the park is named after former state senator Frank D. O'Connor.

Veterans Grove is located on 43rd Avenue by Judge and Ketcham Streets. It is a small park mainly for younger children. The park's plaque states that it was dedicated "to the memory of those soldiers from Elmhurst who lost their lives serving in World War I." The park land was acquired in 1928, and the park was originally called the Elmhurst Memorial Park. It was renovated in 1994–6.

Horsebrook Island is a small triangular green space at the junction of 56th Avenue, Justice Avenue and 90th Street that was named after a stream that once ran through the Newtown settlement. The creek was buried in the first three decades of the twentieth century.

Libra Triangle is a small triangular green space at the junction of Justice Avenue and Broadway.

Newtown Playground is located on 92nd Street and 56th Avenue. There are two children's playgrounds, chess tables, swings, sprinklers, and a small lawn. The park is named after the original name of Elmhurst given by the English. It is one block away from Queens Center Mall and Newtown High School's athletic field.

== Education ==
Elmhurst and Corona generally have a lower ratio of college educated residents than the rest of the city as of 2018. While 28% of residents age 25 and older have a college education or higher, 30% have less than a high school education and 42% are high school graduates or have some college education. By contrast, 39% of Queens residents and 43% of city residents have a college education or higher. The percentage of Elmhurst and Corona students excelling in math rose from 36% in 2000 to 66% in 2011, and reading achievement rose from 42% to 49% during the same time period.

Elmhurst and Corona's rate of elementary school student absenteeism is less than the rest of New York City. In Elmhurst and Corona, 11% of elementary school students missed twenty or more days per school year, lower than the citywide average of 20%. Additionally, 81% of high school students in Elmhurst and Corona graduate on time, more than the citywide average of 75%.

=== Schools ===
Elmhurst contains the following schools:

- PS 7 - Louis F. Simeone
- PS 13 - Clement C Moore
- PS 89 - Elmhurst
- PS 102 - Bayview
- PS 877 - 51st Avenue Academy- now called PS 7 Academy
- St. Adalbert School
- St. Bartholomew School
- IS 5 - The Walter Crowley Intermediate School
- Newtown High School is located in a Baroque, C. B. J. Snyder-designed building at Corona Avenue and 90th Street that was built in 1897.
- Cathedral Preparatory School and Seminary, the last full-time Roman Catholic high school seminary day school in operation in the United States.
- The Elmhurst Educational Complex is a renovated spice factory housing multiple educationally robust schools. Opened in 2008, it contains three high schools, an elementary school, and an early childhood center.
- Central Queens Academy Charter School

=== Library ===
Elmhurst Queens Public Library branch

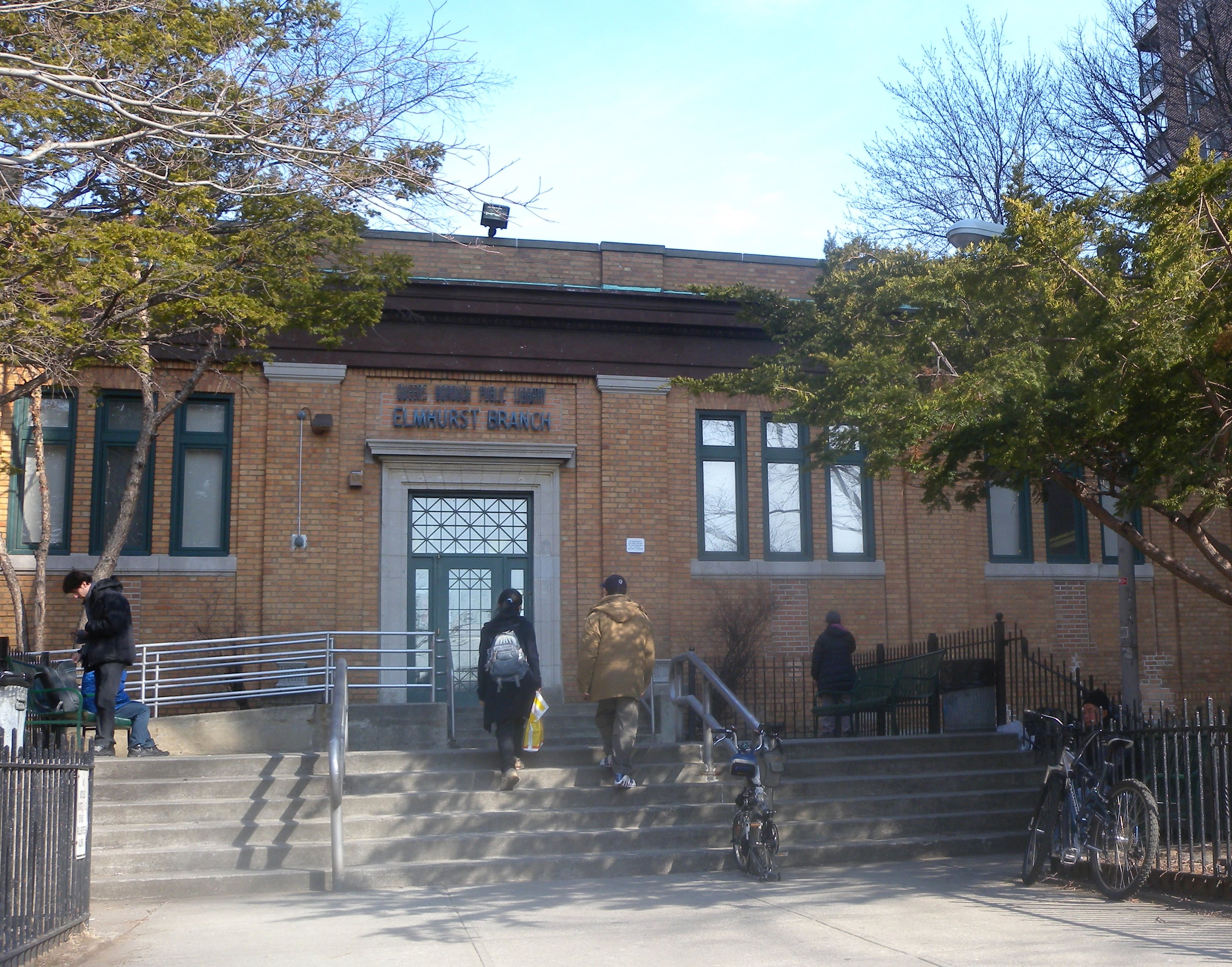
The former building

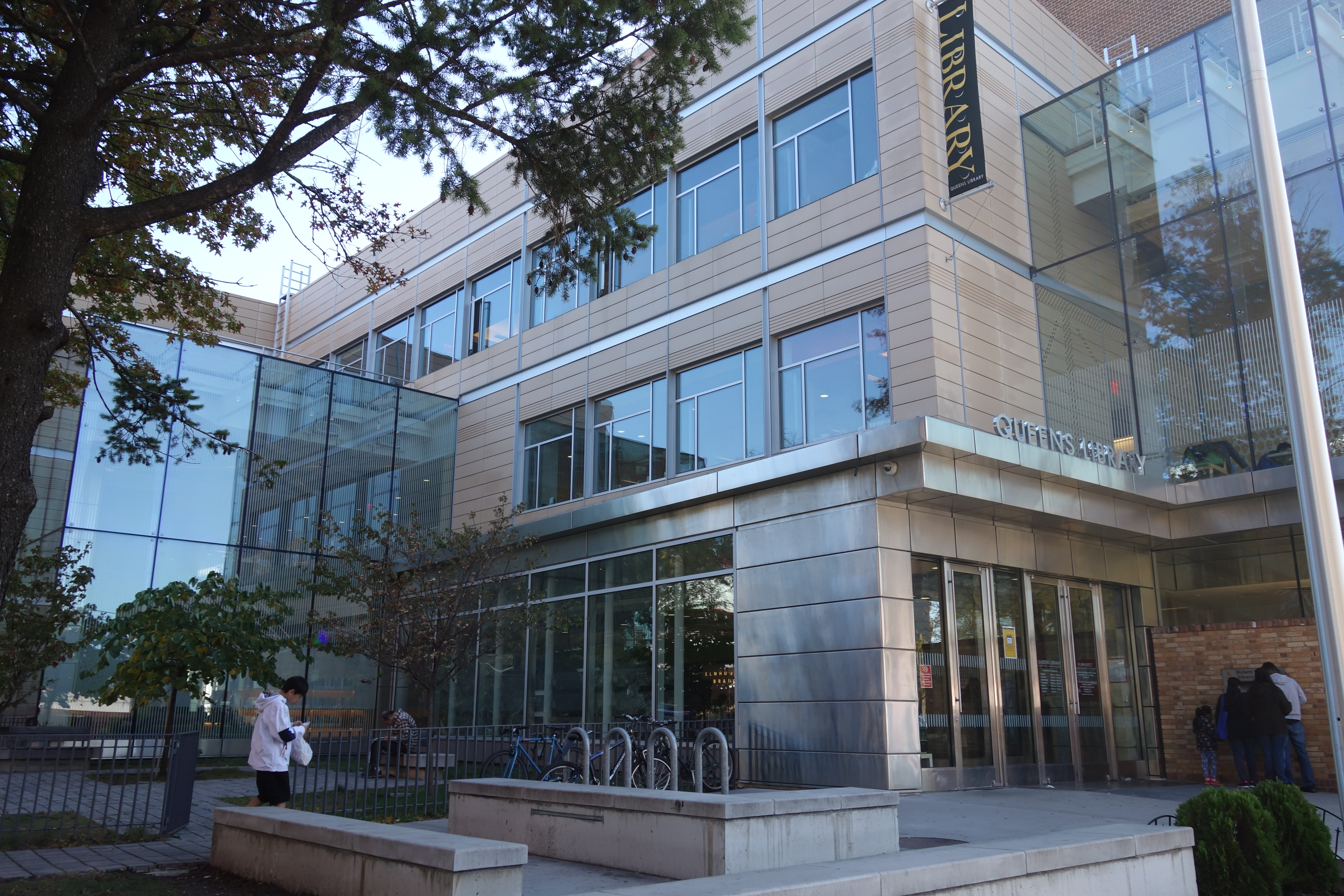
The current building

The Queens Public Library's Elmhurst branch is located at 86-01 Broadway. The original Elmhurst branch, a Carnegie library constructed in 1906, was closed in 2011 and demolished in 2012 for a complete rebuild that was designed to double the building's original size. Planned to be completed in two years, the reconstruction of the library took more than twice the original expected time and exceeded its $27.8 million budget. The new four-story, 32,000-square-foot (3,000 m^{2}) building, which included elements of the original structure, was opened to the public in December 2016 at a cost of $32 million.

== Transportation ==
New York City Subway stations include Jackson Heights–Roosevelt Avenue, Woodhaven Boulevard, Grand Avenue–Newtown, and Elmhurst Avenue, all served by the E, F, M, and R trains of the IND Queens Boulevard Line. In addition, the IRT Flushing Line, served by the 7 and <7> trains, runs along Roosevelt Avenue, the north border of Elmhurst, with stations at 74th Street–Broadway, 82nd Street–Jackson Heights, and 90th Street–Elmhurst Avenue.

Local buses include the Q11, Q14, Q29, Q47, Q52 SBS, Q53 SBS, Q58, Q59, Q60, Q72, Q88 and Q98. Express buses going to and from Manhattan during weekday rush hours include the QM10, QM11, QM12, QM40 and QM42.

Elmhurst is bounded by the Long Island Expressway to the south and by the Brooklyn-Queens Expressway to the west. Queens Boulevard, Woodhaven Boulevard, Junction Boulevard, Roosevelt Avenue, and Broadway are major roads in the community. Elmhurst is connected to Manhattan and Jamaica by Queens Boulevard, and is connected to John F. Kennedy International Airport by Woodhaven Boulevard and to LaGuardia Airport by Junction Boulevard.

== Notable people ==
- Tommie Agee (1942–2001), baseball player
- Mose Allison (1927–2016), jazz player
- Eric B (born 1963), DJ from the hip-hop duo Eric B. & Rakim
- Harry Belafonte (1927–2023), calypso singer and Grammy winner
- Julissa Bermudez (born 1983), Dominican-American actress, co-host for countdown show 106 & Park.
- Brian Brady (born 1962), right fielder who played for the California Angels.
- William J. Casey (1913–1987), director of CIA, born in Elmhurst
- Patty Duke (1946–2016), former president of Screen Actor's Guild, recipient of an Academy Award of Merit for her role in the movie The Miracle Worker
- Joan Hackett (1934–1983), the actress who appeared on television, film and stage.
- Homeboy Sandman (born 1980), rapper.
- Bill Kenville (1930–2018), former NBA basketball player.
- Fumio Kishida (born 1957), former Prime Minister of Japan, attended P.S. 013 Clement C. Moore elementary school in Elmhurst.
- Omar Minaya (born 1958), former General Manager of the New York Mets, raised in Elmhurst, Newtown High School alumnus
- Benjamin Moore (1748–1816), bishop of New York, father of Clement C. Moore
- Clement Clarke Moore (1779–1863), author of the poem "A Visit from St. Nicholas"; the site of his home is now a paved playground at Broadway and 82nd Street
- John Moore, founder of Elmhurst and the first independent minister allowed in New England
- Tony Pastor (1832–1908), vaudeville entertainer and theater manager, sometimes called "The Father of [American] Vaudeville"
- Carroll O'Connor (1924–2001), actor, best known for his role as Archie Bunker on All in the Family
- Frank D. O'Connor (1909–1992), attorney and judge
- Smush Parker (born 1981), former NBA basketball player, attended Newtown High School.
- Jessica Ramos (born 1985), politician
- Lindy Remigino (1931–2018), sprinter who won two gold medals at the 1952 Summer Olympics in Helsinki.
- Tommy Rettig (1941–1996), who played "Jeff" on the Lassie TV series, attended PS 89
- Dixie Roberts, vaudeville tap and specialty dancer, who was a featured dancer in the Ziegfeld Follies.
- Antonin Scalia (1936–2016), former Associate Justice of the Supreme Court of the United States, attended PS 13
- Risë Stevens (1913–2013), opera singer, attended Newtown High School
- Carlos Dengler (born 1974), musician and actor, best known as co-founder, former bass guitarist and keyboardist of rock band Interpol
- Charlie Villanueva (born 1984), Dominican-American NBA power forward for the Detroit Pistons

== In popular culture ==
McDowell's, the fictional restaurant depicted in the 1988 film Coming to America, is located in Elmhurst. For the week-long shot, the filmmakers cosmetically altered an existing Wendy's restaurant, which was closed in May 2013 and was razed by December 2013 to make way for condominiums. Images of surrounding streets were also used in the movie.

The CBS show Blue Bloods filmed for its third season on the residential streets of Elmhurst in 2012.

Part of the Revenge of the Green Dragons was filmed in Elmhurst with cameos from locals.

== See also ==
- Chinatown, Avenue U (唐人街, U大道)
- Chinatown, Bensonhurst (唐人街, 本生浒)
- Chinatown, Brooklyn (布鲁克林華埠)
- Chinatown, Flushing (法拉盛華埠)
- Chinatown, Manhattan (紐約華埠)
- Chinatowns in the United States
- Chinese Americans in New York City
- Koreatown, Fort Lee
- Koreatown, Long Island
- Koreatown, Manhattan
- Koreatown, Palisades Park
- Little Hong Kong/Guangdong (小香港/廣東)
- Little Fuzhou (小福州)
- Sunset Park, Brooklyn
