= First Presbyterian Church of Newtown =

Presbyterian church in Queens, New York

- U.S. National Register of Historic Places
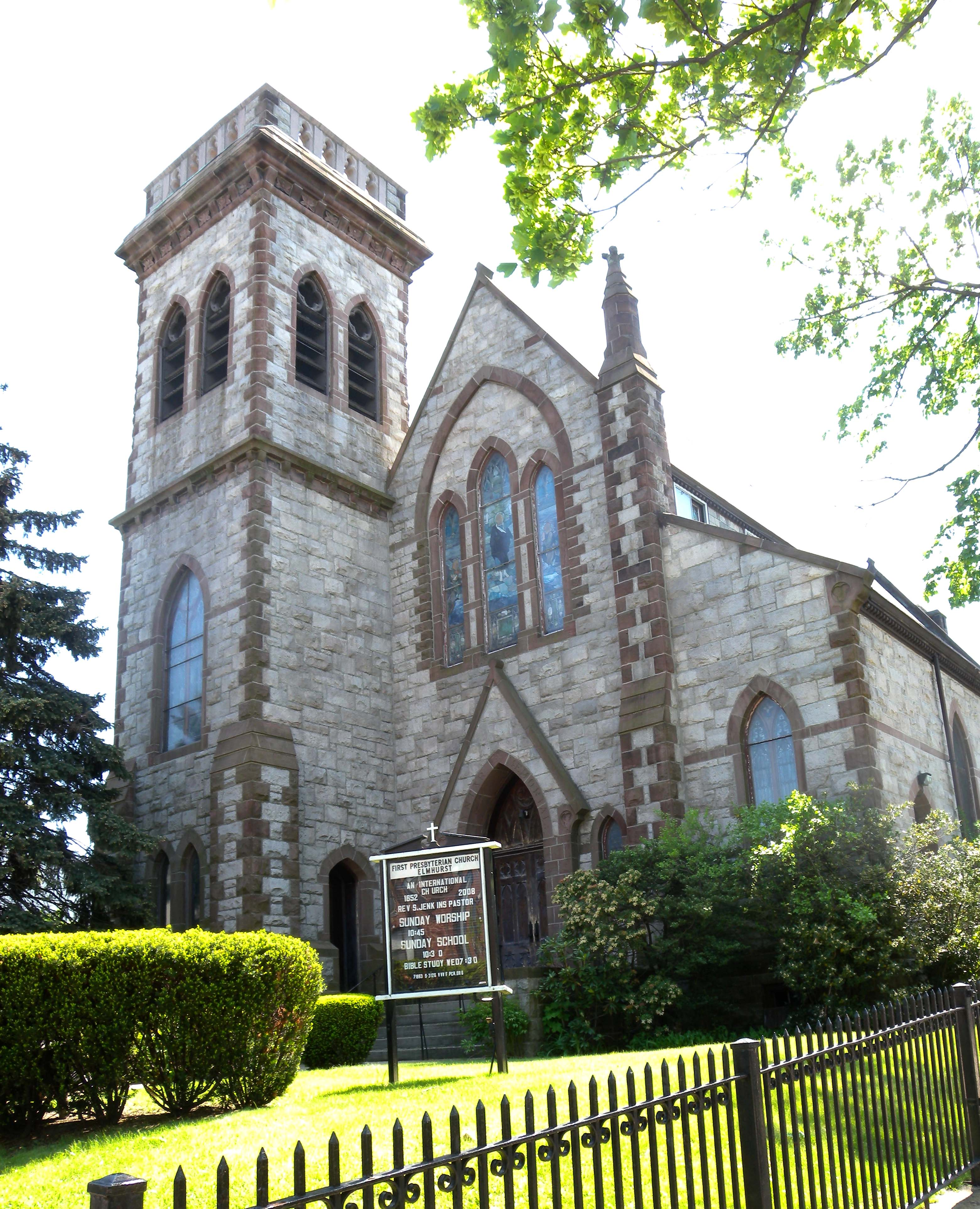
- Seen in May 2009
- Location: 54-05 Seabury St., Elmhurst, New York
- Coordinates: 40.7357°N 73.8770°W
- Area: 0.66 acres (0.27 ha)
- Built: 1895 (current church); 1907 (manse); 1931 (parish hall)
- Architect: Collins, Frank A.; Meyer & Mathieu
- Architectural style: Late Gothic Revival, Collegiate Gothic
- NRHP reference No.: 13000696
- Added to NRHP: September 9, 2013

The First Presbyterian Church of Newtown is a historic Presbyterian church in the Elmhurst neighborhood of Queens in New York City. The church complex is composed of the main church, a parish hall, and a manse. The current complex at 54th Avenue, between Seabury Street and Queens Boulevard, is the fifth church complex built for the congregation.

The congregation was founded in 1652 and was originally housed in a building that it shared with other congregations. In 1669, the town of Newtown (later Elmhurst) erected a new building for the churches. The congregation became part of the Presbyterian Church in 1715 and built a structure that was demolished during the American Revolutionary War. A second building, called the Old White Church, was erected in 1791 and remained standing until 1928. The congregation moved to its current building when it was completed in 1895. The manse was built in 1907. Both the church building and manse were moved in 1924 when Queens Boulevard was widened, and the parish hall was built in 1931.

The current church building is a Late Gothic Revival style, granite and brownstone church with a steep slate gable roof. It features three large pointed arched windows and an 85-foot-tall (26 m) square bell tower. The parish hall is a Collegiate Gothic-style brick building with a slate roof. The manse is a 2 1/2-story frame residence. The church complex was listed on the National Register of Historic Places in 2013.

== History ==
=== Initial buildings (c. 1652–1715) ===
Elmhurst was established in 1652 as the town of Middleburgh, an outpost of the Dutch colony of New Amsterdam. The town's leaders had intended it to be a religiously diverse settlement. Soon after Middleburgh's establishment, a town building was erected to serve as both a community and religious building; it was on what is now Dongan Street near Broadway. Use of this building was shared by various religious denominations: the Church of England, the Dutch Reformed Church, the Presbyterians, and the Quakers. After the English gained control of New Amsterdam in 1665, they renamed Middleburgh to "Newtown"; subsequently, Newtown became part of Queens County in 1683.

In 1669, the town planned to build a new church for all of these denominations on a "small gore of land" near Grand Avenue and Queens Boulevard, donated by Ralph Hunt, a prominent citizen of the town. According to the town records, the new building was to cost forty pounds, half in corn and half in cattle. The building was enlarged by contractors John Coe and Content Titus in 1694. The next year, Newtown purchased a house and 12 acres (4.9 ha) from Samuel Coe for use as a parsonage.

The Church of England became the Province of New York's official religion after the passage of the Ministry Act of 1693. As a consequence of the act, the parish of Jamaica was extended to cover the towns of Flushing and Newtown. Subsequently, the Society for the Propagation of the Gospel in Foreign Parts (SPG) became responsible for appointing the parish's Anglican rectors, who generally served multiple congregations at the time. During the same period, New York's provincial governor, Lord Cornbury, refused to let any pastor preach in the province if they dissented from the Church of England. However, after he was recalled in 1708, the Presbyterian congregation was allowed to choose its own new pastor, the Rev. Samuel Pumroy, who lived in the church farm parsonage.

=== Separate building (1715–1776) ===
On September 15, 1715, the congregation applied for membership in the Presbyterian Church. The congregation was admitted to the Presbytery of Philadelphia, and at the time, had eight members in full communion. In 1717, the congregation united with others in Jamaica and Setauket to form the Long Island Presbytery.

Jonathan Fish, a parishioner, had deeded land near the present church site to the "dissenting Presbyterian congregation of Newtown" so the congregation could replace its dilapidated church building. The congregation received title to the land in March 1716. A church building was erected, though it was not completed until 1741; it had a spire with a bell suspended at the top.

At the outbreak of the American Revolutionary War in 1775, most of Newtown's inhabitants were Loyalists who sided with the British. The Presbyterian Church of Newtown, like many other American Presbyterian congregations of the time, were Patriots who sympathized with American independence. The church created a "Committee of Correspondence" to communicate with the Continental Congress. A copy of the United States Declaration of Independence was read on the church steps in 1776, some days after independence was declared on July 4. Following the Battle of Long Island in August 1776, Newtown was occupied by the British, and public worship at the church was suspended. Several young Loyalists sawed off the church's steeple in the middle of the night. The British removed the pews and converted the church building into a jail. To insult the Presbyterians, the British left the pulpit in the street as a horse-hitching post. They subsequently destroyed the entire church building and reused the wood to build huts for their soldiers. Records show that some of the timber was sold for $250.

=== Old White Church (1791–1928) ===
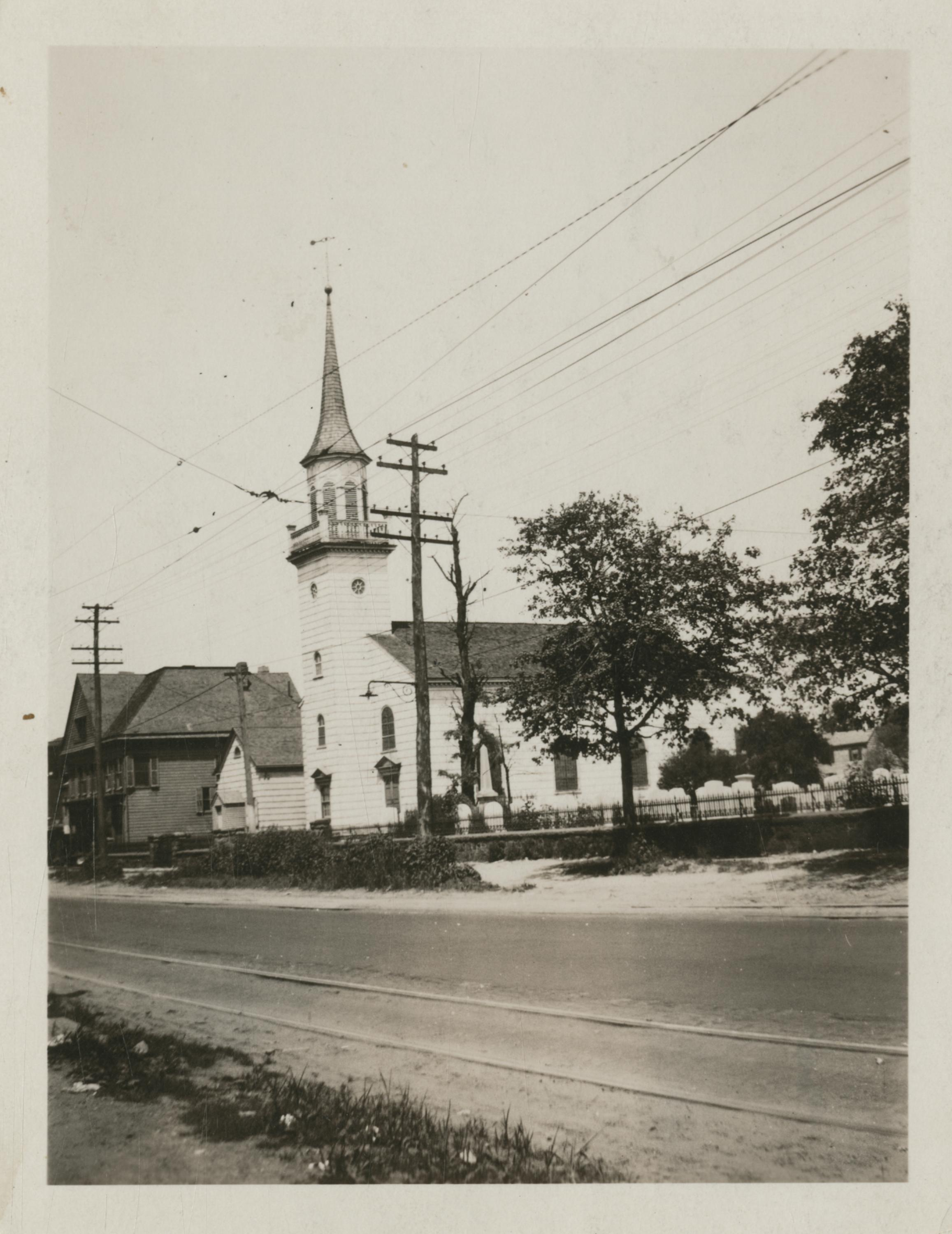
Old White Church

Only five of the original congregants remained in Newtown after the war; the others had been captured or killed, or had fled Newtown. The Reformed Church of Newtown let the Presbyterians use their building for the time being.

The First Presbyterian Church of Newtown was legally incorporated in 1784. A new church building was erected under the ministry of the Rev. Peter Fish, who became stated supply pastor in 1785. The cornerstone was laid in 1787, and the new church was dedicated in 1791. At this time, a bell made by Gerit Bakker was placed in the belfry. This building, later called the Old White Church, was a two-story white-painted wood frame building on the north side of Hoffman Boulevard (present-day Queens Boulevard). A manse was built in 1821, and an adjacent plot of land for the church's cemetery was donated the next year. The church building itself was enlarged in 1836. Further renovations were undertaken during the ministry of the Rev. John P. Knox (1855–1882). This remodeling involved replacing the square-back pews and the windows.

This building continued to be occupied by the congregation until 1895. At that time, the congregation moved to its current building, and the old building became a Sunday school. An annex to the Old White Church was built in 1909. The cemetery continued to accept burials until 1906. The Old White Church's manse was relocated to 53rd Avenue and Seabury Street, a block northwest of the current church, apparently in the mid-1920s. The Old White Church burned in 1928 when the belfry caught fire, presumably following a lightning strike.

=== Current church (1895–present) ===
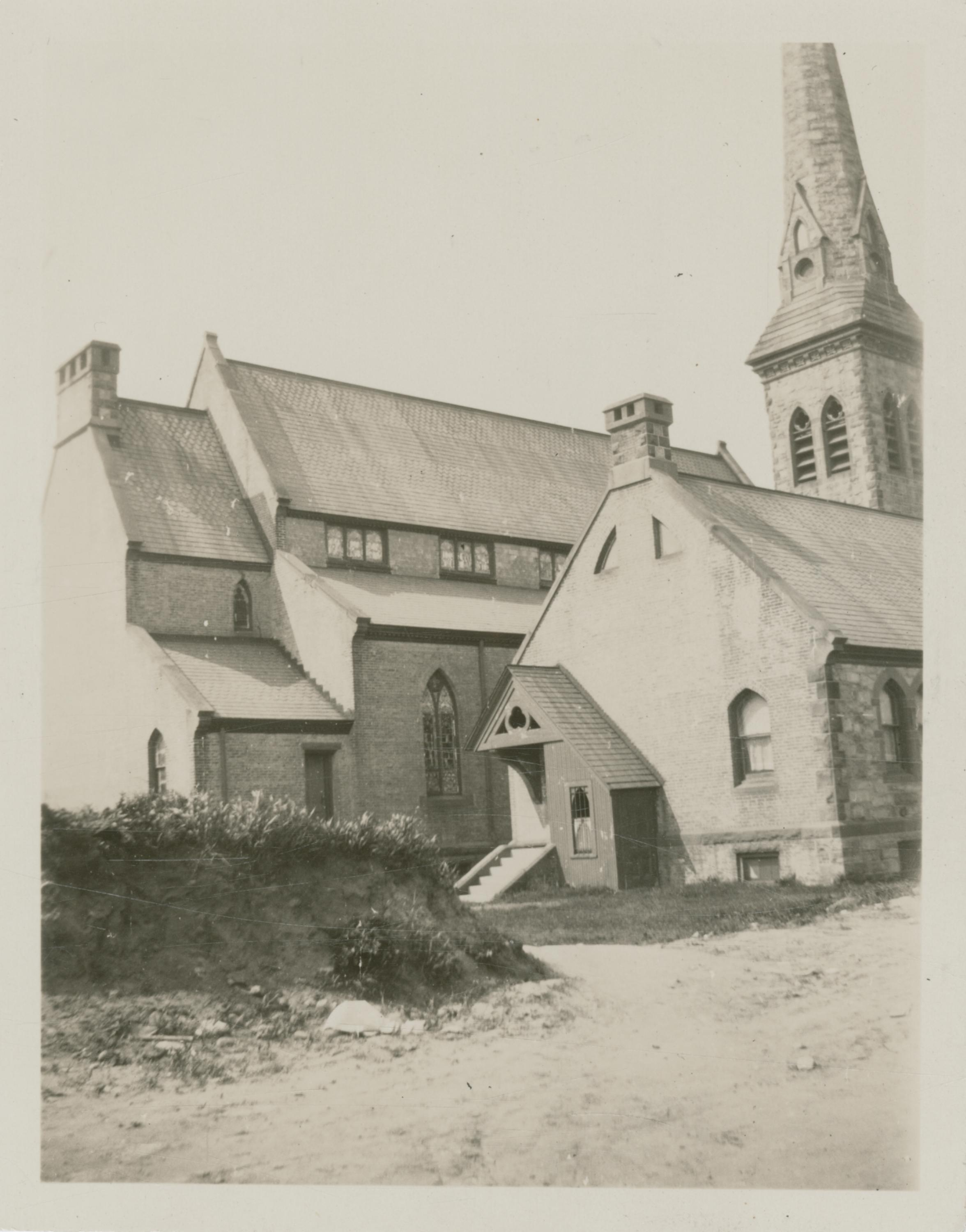
The present church, seen in 1922 before being relocated to its current site

==== Construction and early years ====
John Goldsmith Payntar, a wealthy merchant from Newtown and a member of the Madison Avenue Presbyterian Church, died in August 1891. In his will, he left $65,000 for the construction of a new church building. Payntar stipulated that the building be "an exact copy" of Cherry Valley's Presbyterian Church in Cherry Valley, which Payntar had "greatly admired". Of his bequest, $35,000 was reserved for construction, of which some $4,000 was spent on the spire, $5,000 on the fence, and various other expenses for furnishings. Another $5,000 of Payntar's bequest was dedicated to general upkeep of the church yard. Additional funds were used to construct a stained glass window in Payntar's memory. A monument to Payntar and his family was also erected in the church yard. Frank A. Collins designed the new church while Hopkins & Roberts were the contractors. Construction started on the building in July 1893, and it was dedicated in May 1895. The new structure was built on the south side of Hoffman Boulevard, across the street from the old one. The congregation erected another building east of the bell tower, which was used by the Christian Endeavor organization as a meeting hall. The pastor at the time, the Rev. Jacob Mallmann, resigned five months afterward as a result of a dispute over the maintenance of the new church building.

During the late 1890s, Newtown was renamed Elmhurst and became part of the City of Greater New York. Elmhurst started being developed as a commercial and residential neighborhood. The Brooklyn Daily Eagle reported that the congregation grew by 104 members from 1896 to its 250th anniversary in 1902. The church's trustees agreed to build a new manse in 1905, and it was completed by 1907. The church paid Collins $200, likely in conjunction with designing the manse, which ultimately cost $5,000.

==== Relocation and later history ====
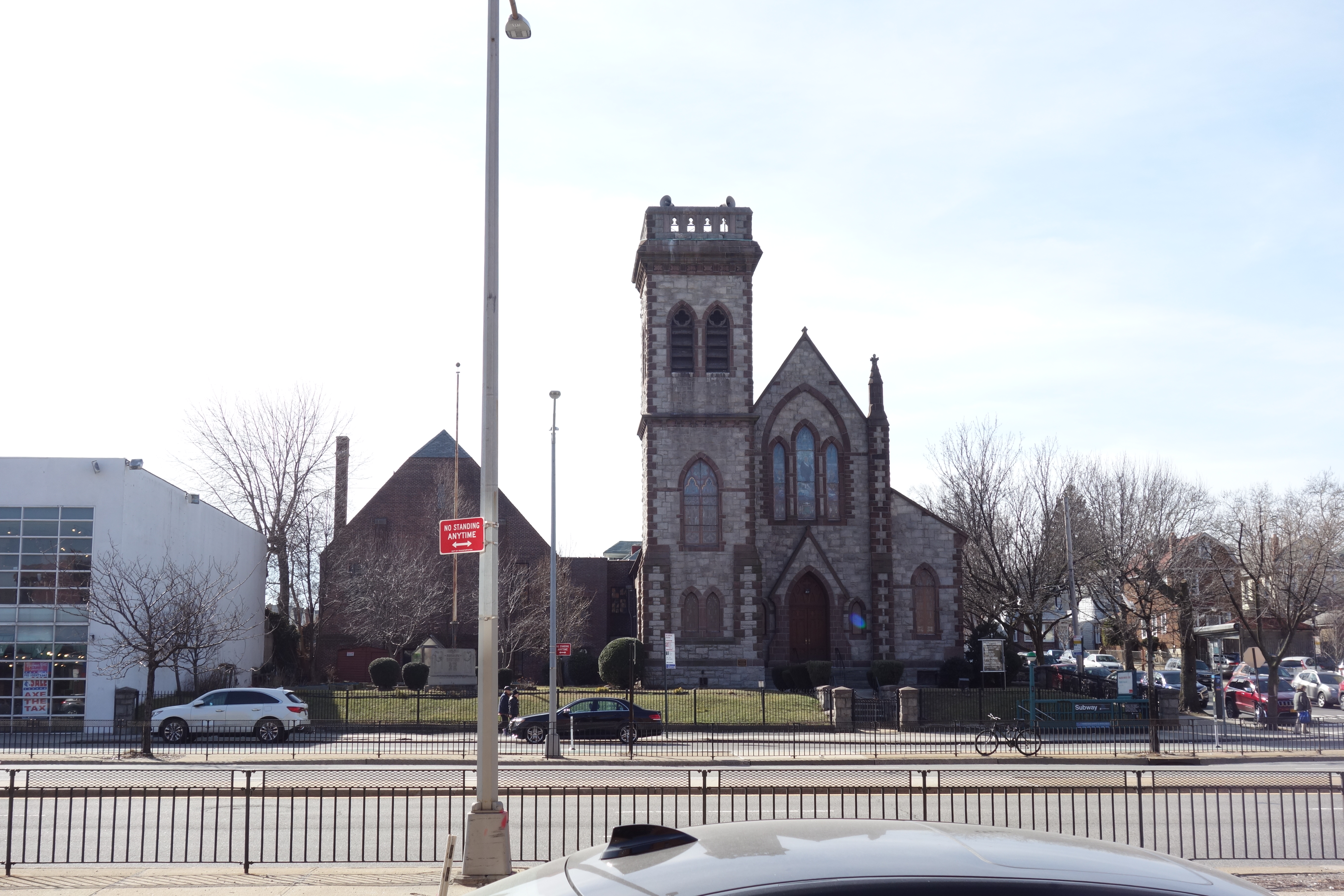
Seen from across Queens Boulevard

Queens Boulevard was developed in the early 20th century, incorporating the former Hoffman Boulevard and connecting Elmhurst to the Queensboro Bridge to Manhattan. The city government formed a commission in 1912 to expropriate land and compensate property owners. In the First Presbyterian Church of Newtown's case, the city offered to either buy and raze the church building or pay the congregation $35,000 for relocation; the congregation chose the latter.

The agreement was made in 1917, but no action was taken until 1922. Walter Kidde and Company were hired to move the church on rollers at a cost of $87,000. Beginning in February 1924 and continuing until late that year, the current 3,000-short-ton (2,700 t) church was moved 125 feet (38 m) south. The 1907 manse was also relocated to Seabury Street and 54th Avenue, behind the church building. The steeple was taken down and the stones stored for later reassembly, though this never happened. The Christian Endeavor building was demolished because the congregation hoped to build a larger social hall.

In 1930, the church's chapel was condemned for the construction of the Independent Subway System's Queens Boulevard Line, whose Grand Avenue–Newtown station contained an entrance directly outside the church. The church hired Meyer & Mathieu to design a new parish house, which was built by Charles R. Krieg Inc. in 1931 at a cost of $75,000. The city was to compensate the church for the acquisition, but the compensation was delayed. Instead, the church paid for the parish house by taking out a $60,000 mortgage in 1930; the mortgage was paid off five years later when the city compensated the church. At the time, it was the church's only debt in its 283-year history, and the church celebrated by burning the mortgage papers. Commercial developers offered the church a $1,000,000 offer for its building in 1951, but the offer was rejected. The following year, U.S. president Harry S. Truman sent a message to the church for its 300th anniversary.

The old church cemetery's land was sold in 1958; the corpses were disinterred and moved to the Cemetery of the Evergreens. By the early 1980s, Elmhurst was becoming increasingly populated by immigrants, and the First Presbyterian Church of Newtown had parishioners who had immigrated from 40 countries. Despite this, the church's then-pastor, the Rev. Charles Sorg, continued to conduct services entirely in English, saying that this would unite immigrants with a single language and "enable people to accommodate themselves into the American scene". To celebrate the church's 350th anniversary in 2003, the congregation planted two trees of Newtown Pippins, a type of apple that had first been grown in a nearby orchard in the 17th or 18th century. The church was deemed eligible for inclusion on the National Register of Historic Places (NRHP) in 2012, and was listed on the NRHP the next year.

== Architecture ==
The church complex is oriented northeast to southwest along the southeastern side of 54th Avenue between Seabury Street and Queens Boulevard. The main facade of the church faces Queens Boulevard to the northeast, outside the entrance to the New York City Subway's Grand Avenue–Newtown station. The manse, a 2 1/2-story frame residence, faces Seabury Street to the southwest. A parish hall is at the church's rear, facing southwest.

=== Church ===
The present church building was designed by Frank A. Collins and built in 1895. It was intended as a replica of Cherry Valley, New York's English Gothic style Presbyterian Church. The church building is a stone structure measuring 86 by 102 feet (26 by 31 m). It has a facade of gray granite with specks of ashlar, as well as brick. There are quoins made of brownstone on all of the building's corners, as well as a string course between the windows of the northwestern facade (which faces 54th Avenue).

==== Exterior ====
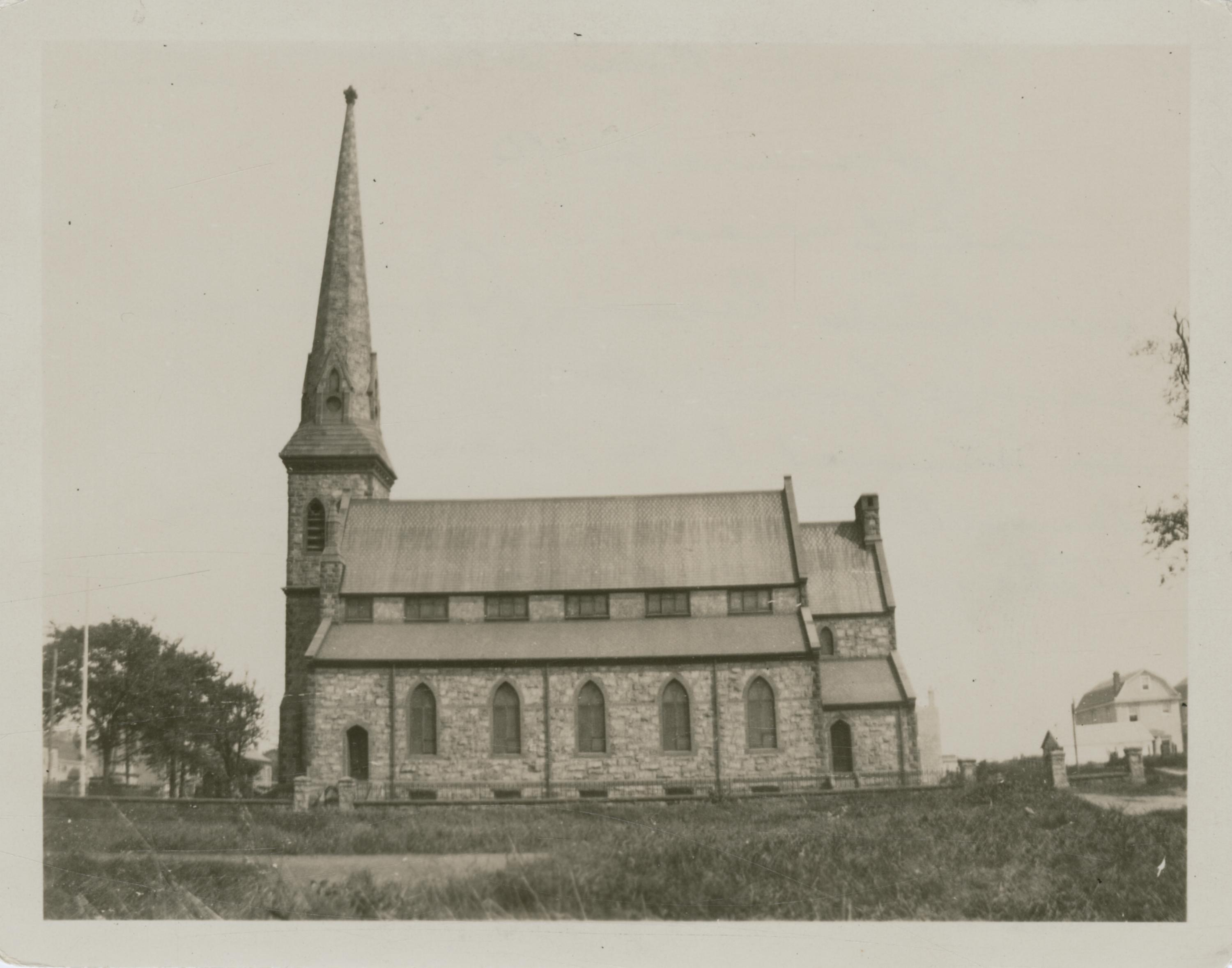
Initial appearance of the church, with its spire

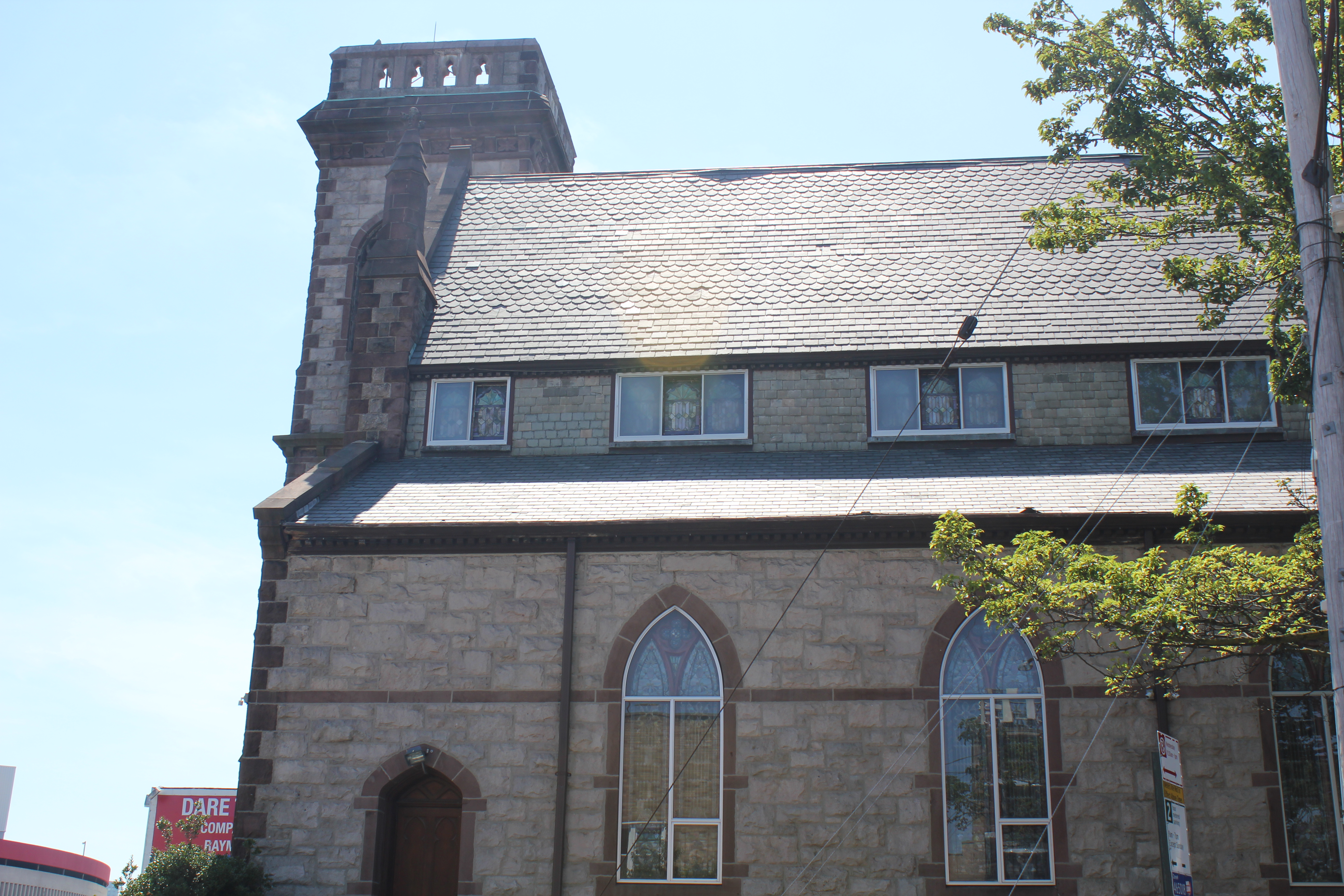
Close up of the northwestern facade, with spire missing

The main entrance contains a central arched doorway. Brownstone jambs on either side of the door rise to a pointed brownstone pediment. On this surround are the words "Payntar Memorial", after John Goldsmith Payntar. The church building has stained glass windows designed by the partnership of Benjamin Sellers and William J. Ashley, although a single window was commissioned from A. Passage. The main facade facing Queens Boulevard shows the Ascension of Jesus, with a smaller window to either side.

The northwestern elevation contains windows that look into the aisle of the nave, as well as the clerestory windows above them. There are five bays; each of these bays has one pointed arch on the lower section of the facade, which are all surrounded with brownstone, and three windows on the clerestory level. A pointed arch with a recessed wooden door is on the left (northern) side. The southeastern elevation is similar to the northeastern one, except that the right (northern) side has a concrete facade, and the left (southern) side contains sections of brick. The southwestern elevation is made of brick and has one arched window to the left and one door to the right. The southern corner of the church building is attached to the parish hall.

Projecting 13 feet (4.0 m) from the eastern corner of the church is a square tower 85 feet (26 m) high and 17 feet (5.2 m) wide. It contains buttresses with brownstone quoins at each corner. The tower has a belfry with a bell made by Gerit Bakker in the Netherlands in 1788. Originally the church building had a "great stone" spire reaching 146 feet (45 m). However, it was disassembled when the church was moved in 1924.

==== Interior ====
Inside, the walls are made of plaster with wooden wainscoting and trusses, while the floors are made of wood. A narthex at the northeast side of the building separates the main entrance from the nave. A gallery balcony runs along the front (northeast side) of the nave. The narthex and nave are separated by three doorways: a double door to the nave's center aisle and a single door to each of the two side aisles in the nave. A staircase on the building's northern corner connects to the gallery, and another on the eastern corner leads to the gallery and belfry. At the gallery, there are two doors leading to the balcony, where there are three full-width rows of pews. Within a recess are three smaller rows, illuminated by the three stained-glass windows along the main facade.

A rectangular nave takes up much of the space in the church building. The nave contains 16 rows of pews, split by a center aisle. There is a chancel and choir loft in the back (southwest side) of the nave. This chancel includes a wooden platform with a wooden altar, screen, four chairs, and lectern. A marble baptismal font and wooden pulpit are also in the chancel.

The interior also contains a choir room in the basement. It was built with steam and gas service, an innovation when the current church was erected. The church has two organs: one built by Ernest M. Skinner in 1907 and another built by the Wicks Organ Company in 1940.

=== Manse ===
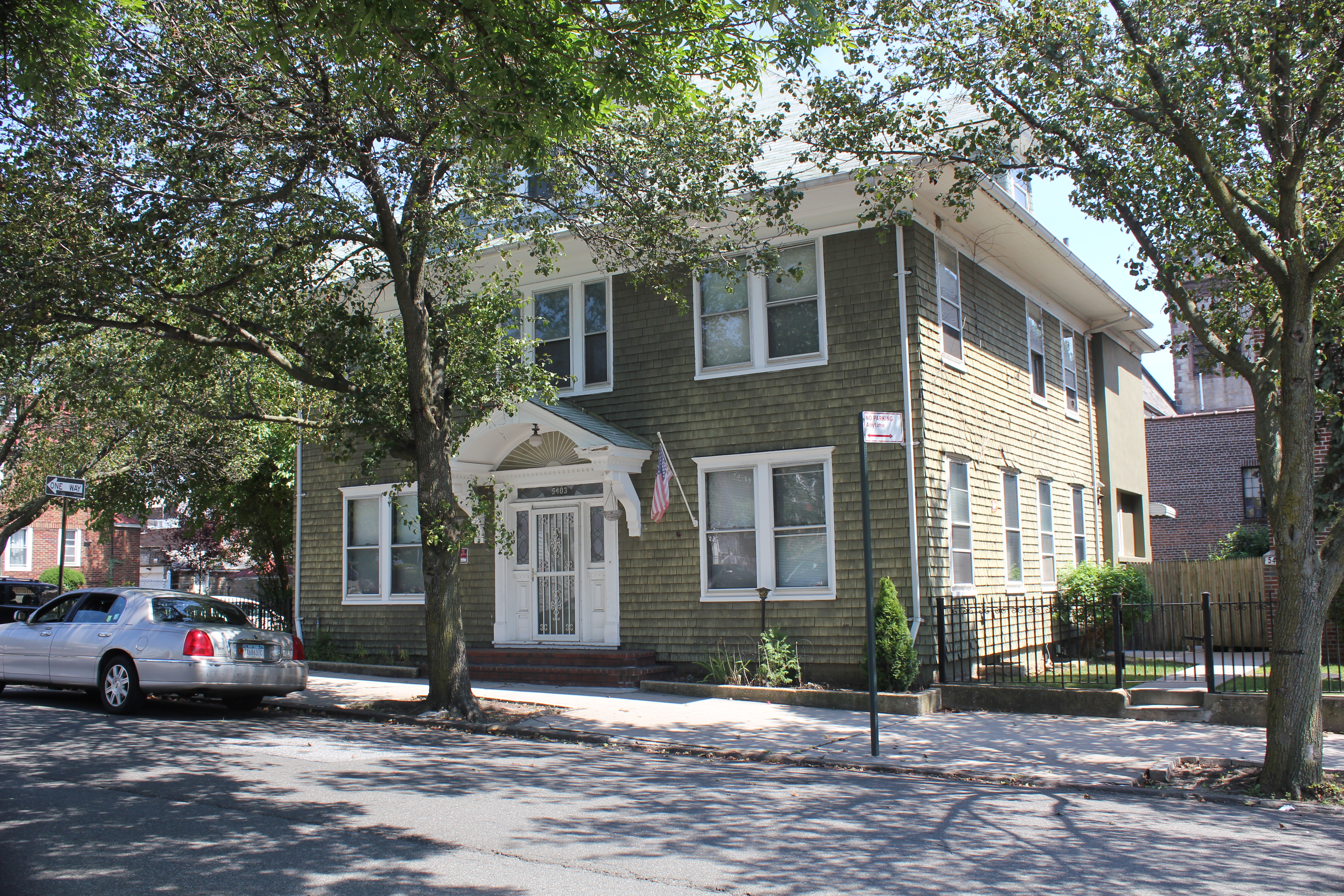
Manse, as seen from Seabury Street

The manse, which dates from 1907, is a nine-room, 2 1/2-story L-shaped house along Seabury Street to the southwest, near the corner with 54th Avenue. It serves as the pastor's residence. As originally built, the manse had a main entrance with Ionic-style pilasters and a portico with a pediment. A porch with columns ran around the manse, and there was a keystone above the rounded dormer window on the main facade. The porch was removed sometime between 1923 and 1925. The facade is clad with green wooden siding with several windows on all four sides; the northeast and southwest elevations contain double- and triple-width windows, while the northwest and southeast elevations contain only single-width windows. The northeast elevation contains a small foyer. It is topped by a hip roof, with a brick chimney above the center and a dormer window projecting above the second floor on the southwest and southeast sides.

The interior has wood trimmings and neoclassical decorative detail. There is a vestibule inside the main entrance, as well as a hallway lit by a chandelier. Stairs go to the second floor and the basement. The first floor has a central hall that leads to a kitchen, three rooms with fireplaces, and a restroom; most of the flooring is made of parquet wood. The second floor has several closets, a pastor's office, two other rooms, and a restroom. Stairs lead to the attic, which contains the dormer windows on the southwest and southeast elevations.

=== Parish house ===
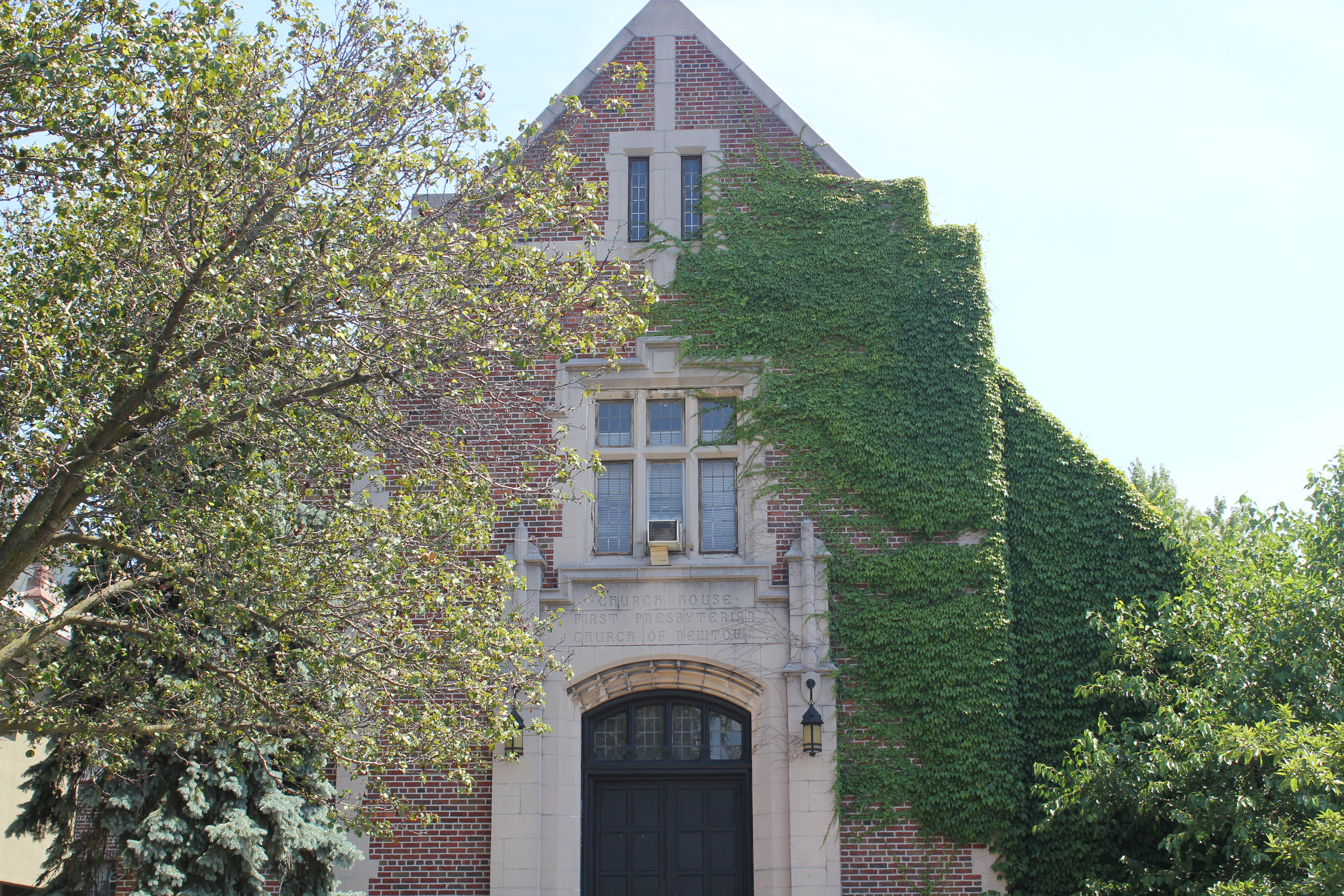
Parish house

The parish house, also called the social hall, is a two-story Collegiate Gothic-style building erected in 1931 by Charles R. Krieg Inc. It is connected to the southwestern facade of the church and faces southwest toward Seabury Street. The parish house has a gable roof made of slate, a steel-and-concrete frame, and a brick facade above a stone base. The main double door on Seabury Street has a stone surround and an inscription identifying it as the Church House. The facade's decorative details include quoins made of limestone, surrounds around the door and window openings, and casement windows. The southeastern elevation has seven bays, while the northwestern elevation has a door and four bays; these bays are separated by brick buttresses capped with stone. The visible portion of the northeastern elevation is clad with brick.

A vestibule, accessed from the main entrance, connects to the parish house's upper story. The upper floor contains a communal space with stage and basketball court, which could be used as an auditorium or a gymnasium, and there is a kitchen beside the stage. The lower story has six classrooms, a kitchen, a "church parlor" with a fireplace and beamed ceiling, locker rooms, and restrooms. These facilities are used for clubs, Sunday school classes, and other activities at the church.

== List of pastors ==
- John Moore (1652–1657)
- William Leverich (1662–1677)
- Morgan Jones (1680–1686)
- John Morse (1694–1700)
- Robert Breck (1701–1704)
- Samuel Pumroy (1708–1744)
- George McNish Jr. (1744–1746), stated supply pastor
- Simon Horton (1746–1773)
- Andrew Bay (1773–1775), stated supply pastor
- James Lyon (1783–1785), stated supply pastor
- Peter Fish (1785–1788), stated supply pastor
- Elihu Palmer (1788–1789), stated supply pastor
- Nathan Woodhull (1790–1810)
- Peter Fish (1810)
- William Boardman (1810–1818)
- John Goldsmith (1818–1854)
- John P. Knox (1855–1882)
- George H. Payson (1882–1889)
- Jacob E. Mallmann (1890–1894)
- William H. Hendrickson (1896–1906)
- David Yule (1906–1910)
- George H. Feltus (1911–1917)
- Howard A. Northacker (1919–1960)
- Joseph F. Quick (1961–1964)
- Albert F. W. Marcus (1964)
- J. Renwick Jackson, Jr. (1964–1965), interim pastor
- Charles L. Sorg (1965–1992)
- Patricia Ann Warren Davies (1993–1996), interim pastor
- Stanley J. Jenkins (1996–2011)
- Louis L. Knowles (2012–2015), interim pastor
- Anette I. Westermark (2015–2018)
- Grace Bowen (2019–2020), interim pastor
- José G. González-Colón (since 2021)
