= Horse Brook (Queens) =

Buried stream in Queens, New York

Coordinates: 40.735964°N 73.872548°W

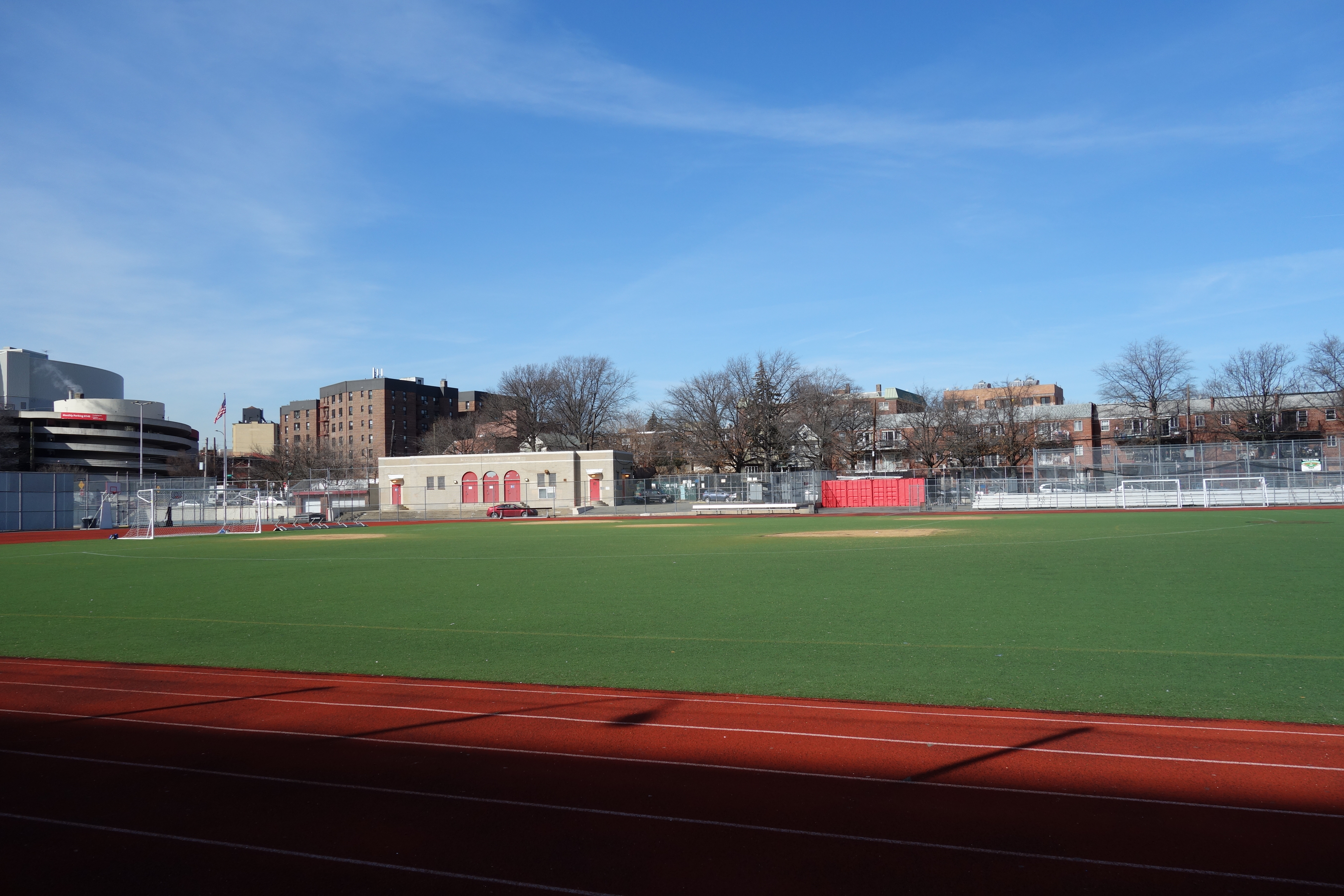
Newtown High School athletic field, a largely undeveloped space atop Horse Brook's former path

Horse Brook is a buried stream located in the neighborhood of Elmhurst in the New York City borough of Queens. Its historic course flows beneath Queens Center Mall, Rego Center Mall, LeFrak City, and the Long Island Expressway, before emptying into Flushing Creek in present-day Flushing Meadows-Corona Park. Flushing Creek is a tributary of the East River.

Horse Brook's headwaters were near Kneeland Avenue and Codwise Place. Horse Brook was first mentioned at an annual town meeting in 1662, where it was voted that "whosoever has cats or dogs or hogs lying dead in any place to offend their neighbors they must bury them or throw them into the creek".

The only remaining traces of Horse Brook today are the mega-blocks on the map that avoided development in the early 20th century. These blocks, which include the sites of Queens Center Mall and LeFrak City, remained vacant until the 1960s. A small park called Horsebrook Island, at 56th/Justice Avenues and 90th Street in Elmhurst, is located atop the approximate location of the buried stream. Libra Triangle, another small park at Justice Avenue and Broadway, is also located atop the stream.
