= Elmhurst Avenue =

Elmhurst Avenue may refer to the following stations of the New York City Subway in Queens:

- 90th Street – Elmhurst Avenue (IRT Flushing Line), serving the 7 train
- Elmhurst Avenue (IND Queens Boulevard Line), serving the E, F, M, and R trains
