= Mizpah (emotional bond) =

Emotional bond between people who are separated

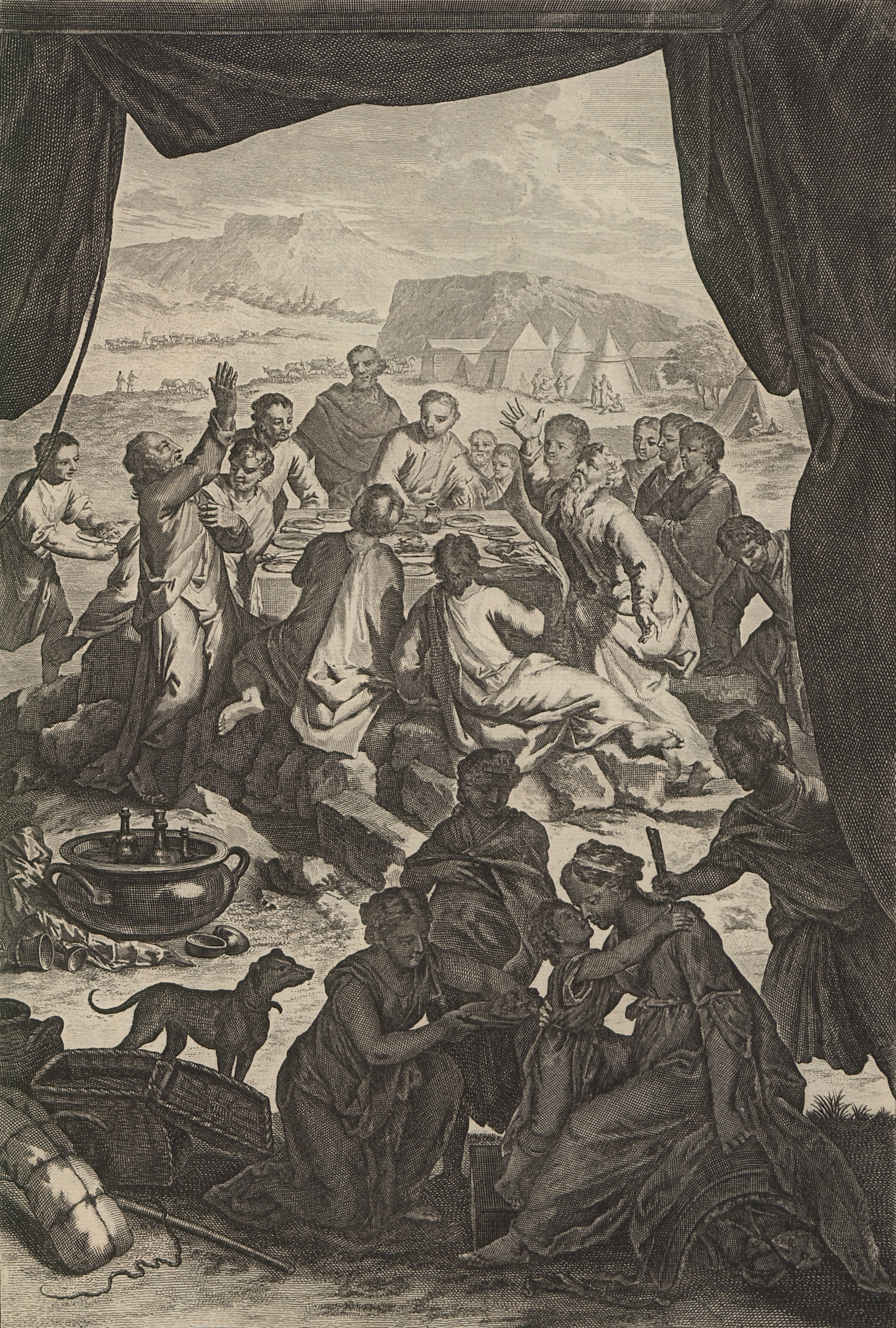
Laban and Jacob make a covenant together, as narrated in Genesis 31:44–54

Mizpah (מִצְפָּה miṣpāh, mitspah) is Hebrew for "watchtower". It is mentioned in the biblical story of Jacob and Laban, where a pile of stones marks an agreement between two people, with God as their watching witness.

== Biblical narrative ==
Jacob had secretly fled the house of Laban, his father-in-law, in the middle of the night, taking flocks of animals, all his other assets, and his two wives and their children (the daughters and grandchildren of Laban) with him, intending never to return. Laban discovered this and pursued Jacob. After discussion, the two decided to formalize the separation.

Laban admitted that his daughters had voluntarily left, saying, "Yet what can I do today about these daughters of mine, or about the children they have borne?" (Genesis 31:43 (NIVUK)). He agreed to let Jacob go in peace, but exacted a promise from Jacob to never abuse his daughters or take additional wives (Genesis 31:50).

The two men then determined to erect a pile of stones, a figurative watchtower, called a mizpah, to commemorate this promise, even though no person was present other than the two men when it was made, for "God is witness between you and me". Both of the men also agreed that they would consider the mizpah a border between their respective territories, and that they would not pass the watchtower to visit one another "to do evil".

== Usage ==
Since that time, the mizpah has come to connote an emotional bond between people who are separated (either physically or by death). Mizpah jewelry is often made in the form of a coin-shaped pendant cut in two with a zig-zag line bearing the words "The LORD watch between me and thee, when we are absent one from another". This is worn to signify the bond. Additionally, the word "mizpah" is often used as the name for a cemetery and can often be found on headstones in cemeteries and on other memorials:

And [it was called] Mizpah (Watchtower); for he said, The Lord watch between me and thee, when we are absent one from another.
