= Libra Triangle =

Green space in Queens, New York, U.S.

Coordinates: 40.737742°N 73.877002°W

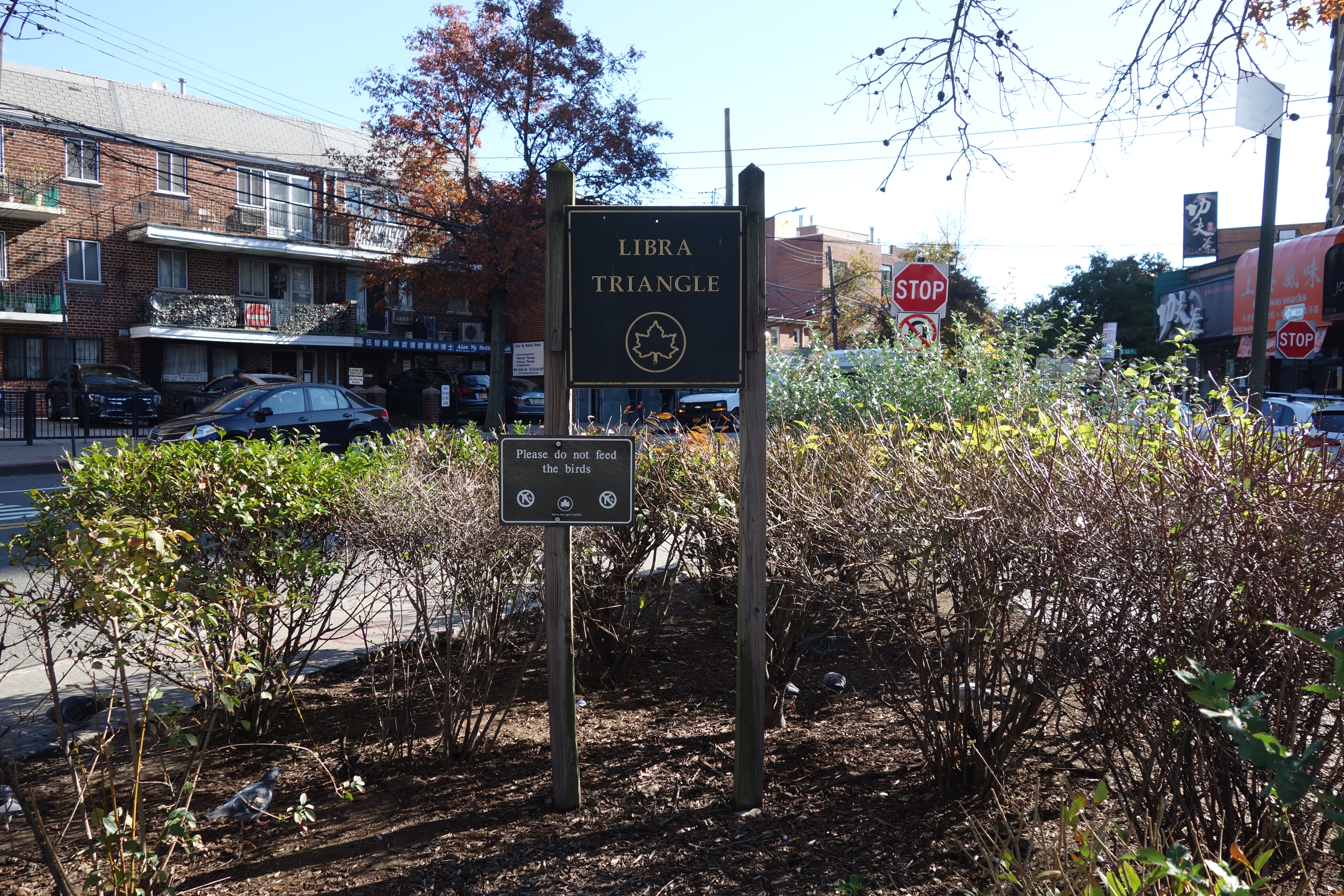
Libra Triangle in November 2019.

Libra Triangle is a 0.028 acres (0.011 ha) public green space located in the neighborhood of Elmhurst in Queens, New York, at the intersection of Broadway and Justice Avenue. Prior to its consolidation with New York City in 1898, Elmhurst was known as the town of Newtown. Its center of local government was at the site of this traffic triangle.

In 1803, Newtown Town Hall was built on this site and expanded with into a courthouse in 1849. After Newtown became a City neighborhood and renamed Elmhurst, the former town seat served as a municipal courthouse and as a police station house until 1940, when the 110th Precinct received a new building on 43rd Avenue. Following Newtown Town Hall’s demolition in 1966, Justice Avenue was widened with a traffic triangle at Broadway.

The park was named Libra Triangle by Commissioner Henry J. Stern in recognition of its history and as a pun on its intersection with Justice Avenue.
