= Reformed Church of Newtown =

- Reformed Church of Newtown Complex
- U.S. National Register of Historic Places
- New York City Landmark
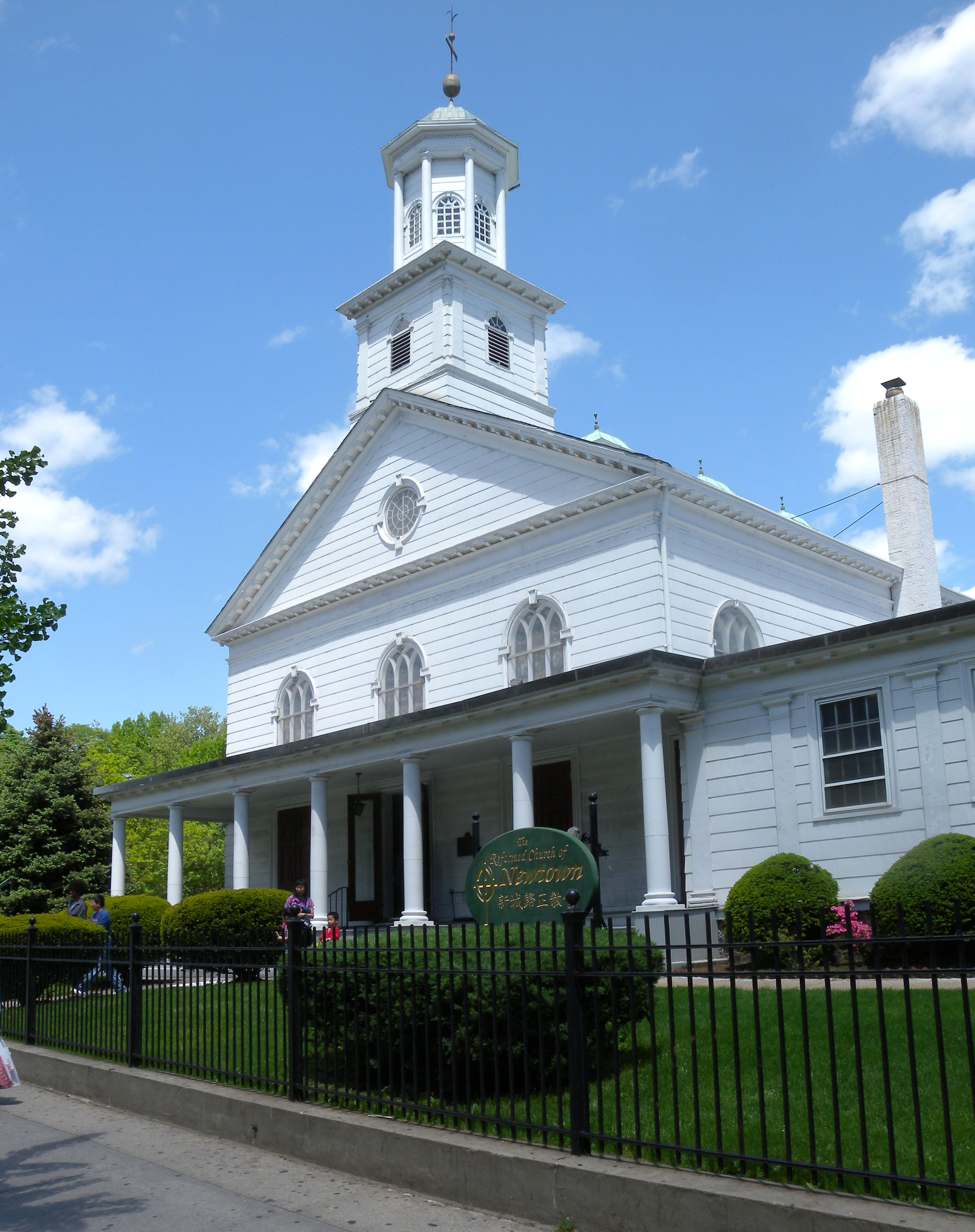
- Reformed Church of Newtown

- Location within New York Location within the United States
- Location: 85-15 Broadway, Queens, New York
- Coordinates: 40°44′23″N 73°52′42″W
- Area: 1.5 acres (0.61 ha)
- Built: 1832
- Architectural style: Greek Revival, Vernacular Greek Revival
- NRHP reference No.: 80002751
- NYCL No.: 0138

Significant dates
- Added to NRHP: April 23, 1980
- Designated NYCL: July 19, 1966

The Reformed Church of Newtown (simplified Chinese: 新城归正教会; traditional Chinese: 新城歸正教會) is a historic Reformed church in the Elmhurst neighborhood of Queens in New York City. The church was first established by Dutch immigrants in 1731. The neighborhood had been established in 1652 by the Dutch as Middenburgh, a village suburb of New Amsterdam (i.e., New York City). After the English took over the Dutch colony of New Netherland in 1664, the village was renamed New Town, later simplified to Newtown. When Newtown was renamed Elmhurst in the late 1890s, the church retained its original name, a name still also carried by the local high school and subway station.

The Reformed Church of Newtown is a congregation in the Queens classis of the New York regional synod of the Reformed Church in America (RCA). Founded in 1628, the Reformed Church in America is the oldest Protestant Christian denomination in the United States.

== Church building ==
The original Federal-Greek Revival style building, completed in 1735, had survived the struggles of the colonial days and the disruptions of the American Revolutionary War (during which the British seized it for use as an armory). It was replaced in 1832 by the present sanctuary, a New York City designated landmark. The Reformed Church of Newtown Complex was added to the National Register of Historic Places in 1980.

The cornerstone of the original building can still be seen in the foundation of its present structure. The sanctuary and adjoining fellowship hall are, as noted by the New York City Landmarks Preservation Commission, "one of the few all wood church groups remaining in the City." A 1989 renovation replaced cupolas that had been damaged by a storm.

== Congregation ==
As the needs of the church and community changed, staffing was increased, structural improvements were made, and the preaching shifted from Dutch to English. In 1956, for its 225th anniversary, President Dwight D. Eisenhower visited the church. For this occasion, the Reverend A. Nelson Doak compiled a brief history of the parish and praised Elmhurst's ethnic diversity.

In 1980, as Elmhurst was changing complexion, Rev. Doak's hope for Newtown Church began to be fulfilled. His successor, the Rev. David Boyce, perceiving the changing needs of the community, initiated a worship service for Taiwanese immigrants and later another service for the increasing population of Tamil-speaking Indians in the area. The originally Dutch church now had services in English, Taiwanese, and Tamil. The Tamil ministry stopped after the death of the Tamil minister, the Rev. Paul Theodore, but some Tamil members incorporated themselves into the English service and remained with the congregation. Meanwhile, the Taiwanese ministry, led by the Rev. Bill H.C. Lee, soon outnumbered Newtown's white congregants, as the membership more than doubled from 1981 to 1982. The Taiwanese had entered in, not as a distinct congregation, but as an additional ministry under the authority of Newtown's leadership. As full members, they voted and soon obtained seats on the church's consistory. Although there can technically be only one “senior pastor” in an RCA parish, Pastor Boyce, recognizing the unique circumstances of the day, had innovatively elevated Lee to be an equal “co-pastor” with him.

In 1995, the Rev. David K.T. Su instituted a third worship service in Mandarin Chinese. Efforts by the church to fulfill the Scriptural call to be "a house of prayer for all peoples" have thus resulted in a Taiwanese service, a Mandarin service, and an English service attended by Asians, Latinos, and white Americans each Sunday. In December 2017, Rev. Su retired after nearly three decades of service to the church, after which the Rev. Dr. Tien-Heng Chiu was installed as Senior Pastor.

The Reformed Church of Newtown has also produced several ministers for the Reformed Church of America in recent decades: the Rev. I. Douglas Estella (ordained 1986) and the Rev. Ben Lin (ordained 1997), both sons of Newtown Church.

== See also ==
- Chinese Rites controversy
- List of New York City Designated Landmarks in Queens
- National Register of Historic Places listings in Queens County, New York
