= National Register of Historic Places listings in Queens, New York =

Location of Queens County in New York

List of the National Register of Historic Places listings in Queens, New York

This is intended to be a complete list of properties and districts listed on the National Register of Historic Places in Queens, New York. The locations of National Register properties and districts (at least for all showing latitude and longitude coordinates below) may be seen in a map by clicking on "Map of all coordinates". Four of the properties are further designated as U.S. National Historic Landmarks.

This National Park Service list is complete through NPS recent listings posted September 11, 2026.

Contents: Counties in New York
Albany (Albany) – Allegany – Bronx – Broome – Cattaraugus – Cayuga – Chautauqua – Chemung – Chenango – Clinton – Columbia – Cortland – Delaware – Dutchess (Poughkeepsie, Rhinebeck) – Erie (Buffalo) – Essex – Franklin – Fulton – Genesee – Greene – Hamilton – Herkimer – Jefferson – Kings – Lewis – Livingston – Madison – Monroe (Rochester) – Montgomery – Nassau – New York (Below 14th Street, 14th to 59th Streets, 59th to 110th Streets, Above 110th Street, Islands) – Niagara (Niagara Falls) – Oneida – Onondaga (Syracuse) – Ontario – Orange – Orleans – Oswego – Otsego – Putnam – Queens – Rensselaer – Richmond – Rockland – St. Lawrence – Saratoga – Schenectady – Schoharie – Schuyler – Seneca – Steuben – Suffolk – Sullivan – Tioga – Tompkins – Ulster – Warren – Washington – Wayne – Westchester (Northern, Southern, New Rochelle, Peekskill, Yonkers) – Wyoming – Yates

== Listings county-wide ==
	Name on the Register	Image	Date listed	Location	Neighborhood	Description
1	1964-1965 New York World's Fair New York State Pavilion	1964-1965 New York World's Fair New York State Pavilion	November 20, 2009 (#09000942)	Flushing Meadows – Corona Park; 40°44′39″N 73°50′40″W	Flushing	
2	1964-1965 New York World's Fair Carousel	1964-1965 New York World's Fair Carousel	February 23, 2016 (#16000038)	54th & 56th Aves. on 111th St. 40°44′36″N 73°50′57″W	Flushing	Combination of two old Coney Island carousels for World's Fair is one of few fairground attractions left from it
3	45th Road – Court House Square Station (Dual System IRT)	45th Road – Court House Square Station (Dual System IRT)	March 30, 2005 (#05000229)	Above 23rd St. bet. 44th Dr. and 45th Rd. 40°44′47″N 73°56′45″W	Long Island City	Subway station (7 and <7> trains)
4	68th Avenue-64th Place Historic District	68th Avenue-64th Place Historic District	September 30, 1983 (#83001763)	Roughly 64th Pl. from Catalpa Ave. to 68th Ave. from 64th St. to 65th St. 40°42′20″N 73°53′40″W	Ridgewood	
5	75th Avenue-61st Street Historic District	75th Avenue-61st Street Historic District	September 30, 1983 (#83001764)	60th Lane, 60th and 62nd Sts. bounded by St. Felix, Myrtle, and Cooper Aves. 40°41′55″N 73°53′41″W	Ridgewood	Limited to brick two-story rowhouses in the designated area.
6	Allen-Beville House	Allen-Beville House	September 22, 1983 (#83001760)	29 Center Dr. 40°46′22″N 73°45′03″W	Douglaston	
7	Louis Armstrong House	Louis Armstrong House	May 11, 1976 (#76001265)	3456 107th St. 40°45′20″N 73°51′43″W	Corona	
8	Astoria Center of Israel	Astoria Center of Israel	October 16, 2009 (#09000833)	27-35 Crescent St. 40°46′13″N 73°55′26″W	Astoria	
9	Benevolent and Protective Order of Elks, Lodge #878	Benevolent and Protective Order of Elks, Lodge #878	November 19, 2014 (#14000938)	82-10, 82-20 Queens Blvd. 40°44′14″N 73°52′52″W	Elmhurst	Early fraternal organization building
10	Beth Olam Cemetery	Beth Olam Cemetery	May 16, 2016 (#16000254)	2 Cypress Hills St. 40°41′26″N 73°52′48″W	Cypress Hills	Rural cemetery started in 1851 by the three oldest Jewish congregations in the city; contains many different examples of architecture and funerary art. Shared with Brooklyn
11	Bohemian Hall and Park	Bohemian Hall and Park	March 23, 2001 (#01000239)	29-19 24th Ave. 40°46′22″N 73°54′59″W	Astoria	
12	John Bowne House	John Bowne House	September 13, 1977 (#77000974)	37-01 Bowne St. 40°45′46″N 73°49′32″W	Flushing	
13	Broadway-Flushing Historic District	Broadway-Flushing Historic District	May 12, 2006 (#06000373)	Roughly bounded by 29th Ave., 163rd St., 32nd Ave., 192nd St., 154th and 153rd Sts. 40°46′00″N 73°48′05″W	Flushing	
14	Ralph Bunche House	Ralph Bunche House	May 11, 1976 (#76001266)	115-125 Grosvenor Rd. 40°42′25″N 73°50′16″W	Kew Gardens	
15	Central Avenue Historic District	Central Avenue Historic District	September 30, 1983 (#83001761)	Roughly bounded by Myrtle and 70th Ave., and 65th and 66th Sts. 40°42′10″N 73°53′25″W	Ridgewood	
16	Central Ridgewood Historic District	Central Ridgewood Historic District	September 30, 1983 (#83001762)	Roughly bounded by Fresh Pond Rd., Putnam, 68th, Forest, Catalpa, Onderdonk, and 71st Aves. 40°42′10″N 73°53′57″W	Ridgewood	
17	The Church-in-the-Gardens	The Church-in-the-Gardens	December 11, 2009 (#09001086)	50 Ascan Ave. 40°42′55″N 73°50′33″W	Forest Hills	
18	Church of the Resurrection	Church of the Resurrection	March 7, 2003 (#03000090)	85-09 118th St. 40°42′08″N 73°49′57″W	Kew Gardens/Richmond Hill	
19	Congregation Tifereth Israel	Congregation Tifereth Israel	November 21, 2002 (#02001357)	109-20 54th Ave. 40°44′32″N 73°51′12″W	Corona	
20	Cooper Avenue Row Historic District	Cooper Avenue Row Historic District	September 30, 1983 (#83001765)	6434-6446 Cooper Ave. 40°41′53″N 73°53′27″W	Ridgewood	
21	Cornelia-Putnam Historic District	Cornelia-Putnam Historic District	September 30, 1983 (#83001766)	Residential rowhouses on Cornelia St. and Putnam Ave, bounded by Jefferson St., Wyckoff, and Myrtle Aves. 40°41′56″N 73°54′27″W	Ridgewood	
22	Cornell Farmhouse	Cornell Farmhouse	July 24, 1979 (#79001620)	73-50 Little Neck Pkwy; 40°44′54″N 73°43′14″W	Glen Oaks	
23	Cypress Avenue East Historic District	Cypress Avenue East Historic District	September 30, 1983 (#83001767)	Roughly bounded by Linden and Cornelia Sts., Seneca and St. Nicholas Aves. 40°42′06″N 73°54′31″W	Ridgewood	
24	Cypress Avenue West Historic District	Cypress Avenue West Historic District	September 30, 1983 (#83001768)	Roughly bounded by St. Nicholas and Seneca Aves., Linden and Stockholm Sts. 40°42′06″N 73°54′15″W	Ridgewood	
25	Douglaston Hill Historic District	Douglaston Hill Historic District	August 31, 2000 (#00001016)	Roughly bounded by Douglaston Pkwy., Northern Blvd., 244th St., 243rd St., and Long Island RR; 40°46′03″N 73°44′43″W	Douglaston	
26	Douglaston Historic District	Douglaston Historic District	September 1, 2005 (#05000937)	Roughly bounded by Shore Rd., Marinette St., Douglas Rd. and Cherry St. 40°46′33″N 73°45′02″W	Douglaston	
27	Elmhurst Avenue Subway Station (IND)	Elmhurst Avenue Subway Station (IND)	July 6, 2005 (#05000627)	Beneath Broadway at 82nd St. and 45th Ave. and Elmhurst Ave. 40°44′33″N 73°52′56″W	Elmhurst	Subway station (E, F, M, and R trains)
28	Evergreens Cemetery	Evergreens Cemetery	November 15, 2007 (#07001192)	1629 Bushwick Ave. 40°41′02″N 73°54′04″W	Ridgewood	
29	Far Rockaway Beach Bungalow Historic District	Far Rockaway Beach Bungalow Historic District	July 17, 2013 (#13000499)	Beach 24th, Beach 25th & Beach 26th Sts. 40°35′39″N 73°45′30″W	Far Rockaway	Small beach bungalows that have survived suburbanization of area and Superstorm Sandy
30	Firemen's Hall	Firemen's Hall	August 31, 2000 (#00001013)	13-28 123rd St. 40°47′09″N 73°50′44″W	College Point	
31	First Presbyterian Church of Newtown	First Presbyterian Church of Newtown	September 9, 2013 (#13000696)	54-05 Seabury St. 40°44′08″N 73°52′46″W	Elmhurst	1873 High Victorian Gothic brick and stone church built as a replica of one upstate
32	First Reformed Church	First Reformed Church	April 16, 1980 (#80002753)	153-10 Jamaica Ave. 40°42′09″N 73°48′08″W	Jamaica	
33	First Reformed Church of College Point	First Reformed Church of College Point	November 16, 2018 (#100003117)	18-07, 118-09, 118-19 14th Ave. 40°47′09″N 73°50′55″W	College Point	1872 church and accompanying parsonage are rare examples of remaining wooden rural church buildings in Queens
34	Flushing Armory	Flushing Armory	March 23, 1995 (#95000270)	137-58 Northern Boulevard; 40°45′47″N 73°49′46″W	Flushing	
35	Flushing High School	Flushing High School	February 10, 1992 (#91002036)	35-01 Union St. 40°45′54″N 73°49′39″W	Flushing	
36	Flushing Town Hall	Flushing Town Hall	March 16, 1972 (#72000904)	137-35 Northern Blvd. 40°45′50″N 73°49′49″W	Flushing	1862, now Flushing Council on the Arts
37	Forest Park Carousel	Forest Park Carousel	July 16, 2004 (#04000706)	Woodhaven Blvd. and Myrtle Ave. 40°42′03″N 73°51′31″W	Woodhaven	
38	Forest-Norman Historic District	Forest-Norman Historic District	September 30, 1983 (#83001769)	Forest Ave. from Summerfield to Stephen St. and Norman St. to Myrtle Ave. 40°41′59″N 73°53′58″W	Middle Village	
39	Fort Tilden Historic District	Fort Tilden Historic District	April 20, 1984 (#84002917)	Rockaway Beach Boulevard; 40°33′50″N 73°53′28″W	Rockaway	
40	Fort Totten Officers' Club	Fort Totten Officers' Club	March 17, 1986 (#86000446)	Totten and Murray Aves. 40°47′32″N 73°46′41″W	Bayside	
41	Free Synagogue of Flushing	Free Synagogue of Flushing	October 16, 2009 (#09000834)	41-60 Kissena Blvd. 40°45′27″N 73°49′40″W	Flushing	
42	Fresh Pond-Traffic Historic District	Fresh Pond-Traffic Historic District	September 30, 1983 (#83001770)	Roughly bounded by Fresh Pond Rd., Traffic Ave., Woodbine and Linden Sts. 40°42′34″N 73°53′49″W	Ridgewood	Residential row houses on Linden, Gates, and Palmetto Aves.
43	Grace Episcopal Church Complex	Grace Episcopal Church Complex	September 8, 1983 (#83001771)	15515 Jamaica Avenue; 40°42′14″N 73°48′07″W	Jamaica	
44	Grove-Linden-St. John's Historic District	Grove-Linden-St. John's Historic District	September 30, 1983 (#83001772)	Fairview Ave., St. John's Rd., Linden and Grove Sts. 40°42′23″N 73°54′26″W	Middle Village	
45	Hunters Point Historic District	Hunters Point Historic District	September 19, 1973 (#73001251)	Along 45th Ave., between 21st and 23rd Sts. 40°44′49″N 73°56′48″W	Long Island City	
46	Jackson Heights Historic District	Jackson Heights Historic District	January 27, 1999 (#99000059)	Bounded by Roosevelt Ave., Broadway, Leverich St., Northern Blvd., and 90th St. 40°45′05″N 73°53′13″W	Jackson Heights	
47	Jacob Riis Park Historic District	Jacob Riis Park Historic District	June 17, 1981 (#81000081)	Rockaway Beach Blvd. 40°34′03″N 73°52′24″W	Rockaway	Presumably including but larger than Jacob Riis Park
48	Jamaica Chamber of Commerce Building	Jamaica Chamber of Commerce Building	September 8, 1983 (#83001773)	8931 161st St. 40°42′19″N 73°48′00″W	Jamaica	
49	Jamaica Savings Bank	Jamaica Savings Bank	May 19, 1983 (#83001774)	161-02 Jamaica Ave. 40°42′14″N 73°47′57″W	Jamaica	
50	Kent Manor		April 28, 2022 (#100007667)	117-01 Park Ln. South; 40°42′30″N 73°50′14″W	Kew Gardens	Kent Manor
51	King Manor	King Manor	December 2, 1974 (#74001295)	150th St. and Jamaica Ave. 40°42′11″N 73°51′43″W	Jamaica	
52	Kingsland Homestead	Kingsland Homestead	May 31, 1972 (#72000905)	37th St. and Parsons Blvd. 40°45′49″N 73°49′27″W	Flushing	
53	J. Kurtz and Sons Store Building	J. Kurtz and Sons Store Building	September 8, 1983 (#83001775)	162-24 Jamaica Ave. 40°42′15″N 73°47′50″W	Jamaica	
54	La Casina	La Casina	March 1, 1990 (#89002259)	90-33 160th St. 40°42′16″N 73°48′00″W	Jamaica	
55	Lent Homestead and Cemetery	Lent Homestead and Cemetery	February 2, 1984 (#84002918)	78-03 19th Rd. 40°46′23″N 73°53′31″W	Jackson Heights	
56	Long Island City Courthouse Complex	Long Island City Courthouse Complex	September 26, 1983 (#83001776)	25-10 Court Sq. 40°44′45″N 73°56′36″W	Long Island City	
57	Long Island Motor Parkway	Long Island Motor Parkway	April 1, 2002 (#02000301)	Roughly Alley Pond and Cunningham Parks, bet. Winchester Blvd. and Clearview Expressway, bet. 73rd Ave. and Peck Ave. 40°44′13″N 73°45′35″W	Fresh Meadows through Oakland Gardens	
58	Madison-Putnam-60th Place Historic District	Madison-Putnam-60th Place Historic District	September 30, 1983 (#83001777)	Roughly bounded by Woodbine St., 60th Pl., 67th and Forest Aves. 40°42′21″N 73°54′06″W	Ridgewood	
59	Main Street Subway Station (Dual System IRT)	Main Street Subway Station (Dual System IRT)	October 14, 2004 (#04001147)	Near jct. of Roosevelt Ave. and Main St. 40°45′34″N 73°49′51″W	Flushing	Subway station (7 and <7> trains)
60	Maple Grove Cemetery	Maple Grove Cemetery	August 20, 2004 (#04000874)	83-15 Kew Gardens Rd. 40°42′31″N 73°49′27″W	Kew Gardens	
61	Marine Air Terminal	Marine Air Terminal	July 9, 1982 (#82003397)	La Guardia Airport; 40°46′25″N 73°53′10″W	La Guardia Airport	
62	Richard Mott House		February 11, 2026 (#100012710)	12-72 Norton Drive; 40°36′24″N 73°46′10″W	Far Rockaway	
63	Office of the Register	Office of the Register	January 3, 1980 (#80002754)	161-04 Jamaica Ave. 40°42′13″N 73°47′57″W	Jamaica	
64	Old Quaker Meetinghouse	Old Quaker Meetinghouse	December 24, 1967 (#67000015)	S side of Northern Blvd. 40°45′47″N 73°49′51″W	Flushing	
65	Old Town of Flushing Burial Ground	Old Town of Flushing Burial Ground	February 2, 2018 (#100002079)	46th Ave. between 164th & 165th St. 40°45′15″N 73°48′09″W	Flushing	19th-century local pauper's graveyard is final resting place of many African-American and Native American residents
66	Paramount Studios Complex	Paramount Studios Complex	November 14, 1978 (#78001897)	35th Ave., 35th, 36th, and 37th Sts. 40°45′24″N 73°55′30″W	Astoria	Now Kaufman Astoria Studios
67	Parkway Village	Parkway Village	February 28, 2012 (#12000052)	Bounded by Union Tpk., 150th St., Goethals Ave., Parsons Blvd., Grand Central Pkwy., & Main St. 40°43′02″N 73°48′46″W	Kew Gardens Hills	675 unit apartment complex built 1947 for UN employees
68	Poppenhusen Institute	Poppenhusen Institute	August 18, 1977 (#77000973)	114-04 14th Rd. 40°47′04″N 73°51′13″W	College Point	
69	Prospect Cemetery	Prospect Cemetery	January 11, 2002 (#01001438)	159th St. and Beaver Rd. 40°42′04″N 73°48′01″W	Jamaica	
70	Public School 66	Public School 66	August 28, 2003 (#03000850)	85-11 102nd St. 40°41′52″N 73°50′47″W	Richmond Hill	
71	Queens County Savings Bank	Queens County Savings Bank	June 16, 2005 (#05000620)	75-44 Main St. 40°43′21″N 73°49′14″W	Kew Gardens Hills	
72	Queensboro Bridge	Queensboro Bridge	December 20, 1978 (#78001879)	59th St. 40°45′26″N 73°57′22″W	Long Island City	Also listed in the Borough of Manhattan
73	Reformed Church of Newtown Complex	Reformed Church of Newtown Complex	April 23, 1980 (#80002751)	85-15 Broadway; 40°44′23″N 73°52′42″W	Elmhurst	
74	Rego Park Jewish Center	Rego Park Jewish Center	October 28, 2009 (#09000864)	97-30 Queens Blvd. 40°43′41″N 73°51′34″W	Rego Park	
75	Richmond Hill Historic District	Richmond Hill Historic District	March 7, 2019 (#100003430)	Generally 84th-85th Aves. & 113th to 118th Sts. 40°42′11″N 73°50′07″W	Richmond Hill	Covers a small portion of the larger Richmond Hill neighborhood.
76	Ridgewood Fresh Pond Road-Myrtle Avenue Historic District	Ridgewood Fresh Pond Road-Myrtle Avenue Historic District	January 26, 2022 (#100007371)	Generally Fresh Pond Rd. and Myrtle Ave. 40°42′03″N 73°53′41″W	Ridgewood	
77	RKO Keith's Theater	RKO Keith's Theater	October 29, 1982 (#82001260)	129-143 Northern Boulevard; 40°45′48″N 73°49′57″W	Flushing	
78	Rockaway Courthouse	Rockaway Courthouse	February 5, 2014 (#13001155)	90-01 Beach Channel Dr. 40°35′20″N 73°48′58″W	Rockaway Beach	
79	Russell Sage Memorial Church	Russell Sage Memorial Church	September 22, 1986 (#86002678)	1324 Beach 12 St. 40°36′34″N 73°44′51″W	Far Rockaway	Church designed by Ralph Adams Cram with Louis Tiffany windows, recently restored.
80	Saint Benedict Joseph Labre Parish	Saint Benedict Joseph Labre Parish	January 25, 2007 (#06001297)	94-40 118th St. 40°41′33″N 73°49′47″W	Richmond Hill	
81	St. George's Church	St. George's Church	March 7, 2008 (#08000143)	135-32 38th Ave. 40°45′37″N 73°49′55″W	Flushing	
82	St. James Church, Elmhurst	St. James Church, Elmhurst	November 12, 1999 (#99001331)	86-02 Broadway; 40°44′18″N 73°52′41″W	Elmhurst	
83	St. Luke's Episcopal Church	St. Luke's Episcopal Church	November 10, 2010 (#10000900)	85 Greenway South; 40°42′50″N 73°50′41″W	Forest Hills	
84	St. Matthew's Episcopal Church	St. Matthew's Episcopal Church	May 25, 2001 (#01000550)	85-45 96th St. 40°41′46″N 73°50′58″W	Woodhaven	
85	St. Matthias Roman Catholic Church Complex	St. Matthias Roman Catholic Church Complex	September 4, 2012 (#12000599)	58-15 Catalpa Ave. 40°42′07″N 73°54′10″W	Ridgewood	
86	St. Monica's Church	St. Monica's Church	April 9, 1980 (#80002752)	94-20 160th St. 40°42′07″N 73°47′53″W	Jamaica	
87	Seneca Avenue East Historic District	Seneca Avenue East Historic District	September 30, 1983 (#83001778)	Roughly Seneca Ave. E. between Hancock and Summerfield Sts. 40°41′59″N 73°54′07″W	Ridgewood	
88	Seneca-Onderdonk-Woodward Historic District	Seneca-Onderdonk-Woodward Historic District	September 30, 1983 (#83001779)	Roughly bounded by Woodward, Seneca, Catalpa Aves., and Woodbine St. 40°42′09″N 73°54′17″W	Middle Village	
89	Sidewalk Clock at 161-11 Jamaica Avenue, New York, NY	Sidewalk Clock at 161-11 Jamaica Avenue, New York, NY	April 18, 1985 (#85000931)	161-11 Jamaica Ave. 40°42′15″N 73°47′52″W	Jamaica	
90	Sohmer and Company Piano Factory	Sohmer and Company Piano Factory	February 14, 2014 (#14000007)	31-01 Vernon Blvd. 40°46′10″N 73°56′07″W	Astoria	
91	Spear and Company Factory	Spear and Company Factory	November 9, 2017 (#100001807)	94-15 100th St. 40°41′19″N 73°50′36″W	Ozone Park	Intact early 20th-century reinforced concrete factory complex used for making hats and, later, novelty candles, characterized by simplicity of design.
92	Steinway Mansion	Steinway Mansion	September 8, 1983 (#83001780)	18-22 41st St. 40°46′42″N 73°53′52″W	Astoria	
93	Stockholm-DeKalb-Hart Historic District	Stockholm-DeKalb-Hart Historic District	September 30, 1983 (#83004618)	Roughly DeKalb and Woodward Aves., Stockholm and Hart Sts. 40°42′32″N 73°54′52″W	Ridgewood	
94	Summerfield Street Row Historic District	Summerfield Street Row Historic District	September 30, 1983 (#83001781)	59-12 to 59-48 Summerfield St. 40°42′01″N 73°53′48″W	Ridgewood	
95	Sunnyside Gardens Historic District	Sunnyside Gardens Historic District	September 7, 1984 (#84002919)	Roughly bounded by Queens Blvd., 43rd and 52nd Sts. Barnett and Skillman Aves. 40°44′49″N 73°55′03″W	Sunnyside Gardens	
96	Temple of Israel Synagogue	Temple of Israel Synagogue	February 5, 2014 (#13001156)	1-88 Beach 84th St. 40°35′14″N 73°48′34″W	Rockaway Beach	
97	Trans World Airlines Flight Center	Trans World Airlines Flight Center	September 7, 2005 (#05000994)	John F. Kennedy International Airport; 40°38′45″N 73°46′39″W	Jamaica	Designed by Eero Saarinen
98	Triboro Hospital for Tuberculosis	Triboro Hospital for Tuberculosis	January 31, 2019 (#100003397)	82-41 Parsons Blvd. 40°43′02″N 73°48′28″W	Jamaica	
99	Trinity Chapel	Trinity Chapel	January 11, 2002 (#01001445)	1874 Mott Avenue; 40°36′13″N 73°45′05″W	Far Rockaway	
100	Trinity Lutheran Church	Trinity Lutheran Church	May 29, 2008 (#08000471)	31-18 37th St. 40°45′42″N 73°55′09″W	Astoria	
101	US Post Office-Far Rockaway	US Post Office-Far Rockaway	November 17, 1988 (#88002500)	1836 Mott Ave. 40°36′12″N 73°45′03″W	Far Rockaway	
102	US Post Office-Flushing Main	US Post Office-Flushing Main	November 17, 1988 (#88002507)	4165 Main St. 40°45′23″N 73°49′42″W	Flushing	
103	US Post Office-Forest Hills Station	US Post Office-Forest Hills Station	November 17, 1988 (#88002503)	10628 Queens Blvd. 40°43′18″N 73°50′50″W	Forest Hills	
104	US Post Office-Jackson Heights Station	US Post Office-Jackson Heights Station	November 17, 1988 (#88002504)	7802 37th Ave. 40°44′57″N 73°53′16″W	Jackson Heights	
105	US Post Office-Jamaica Main	US Post Office-Jamaica Main	November 17, 1988 (#88002335)	8840 164th St. 40°42′00″N 73°48′00″W	Jamaica	
106	US Post Office-Long Island City	US Post Office-Long Island City	May 11, 1989 (#88002348)	4602 21st St. 40°44′44″N 73°56′57″W	Long Island City	
107	Cornelius Van Wyck House	Cornelius Van Wyck House	October 6, 1983 (#83004149)	37-04 Douglaston Parkway; 40°46′23″N 73°45′12″W	Douglaston	
108	Vander Ende-Onderdonk House Site	Vander Ende-Onderdonk House Site	January 31, 1977 (#77000975)	1820 Flushing Ave. 40°42′40″N 73°55′12″W	Ridgewood	
109	Conrad Voelcker House	Conrad Voelcker House	September 18, 2020 (#100005569)	149-19 38th Ave. 40°42′25″N 73°54′15″W	Flushing	AKA the Voelker Orth Museum.
110	Woodbine-Palmetto-Gates Historic District	Woodbine-Palmetto-Gates Historic District	September 30, 1983 (#83001783)	Roughly bounded by Forest and Fairview Aves., Woodbine and Linden Sts. 40°42′25″N 73°54′15″W	Middle Village	
111	Wyckoff-Snediker Family Cemetery	Wyckoff-Snediker Family Cemetery	May 25, 2001 (#01000549)	85-45 96th St. 40°41′46″N 73°50′57″W	Woodhaven	Located behind St. Matthew's Episcopal Church (see above) and not clearly visible from the street.

== See also ==
- Statewide: National Register of Historic Places listings in New York
- Citywide: Manhattan, Brooklyn, Staten Island, Bronx
- List of New York City Designated Landmarks in Queens
