= Trinity Chapel (disambiguation) =

Trinity Chapel is a chapel within Canterbury Cathedral.

Trinity Chapel may also refer to:

== England ==
- Trinity Chapel, Conduit Street, a former proprietary chapel in London, demolished in 1875
- Trinity Independent Chapel, an independent chapel in Poplar, East London

== United States ==
- Trinity Chapel-Episcopal, Ottawa, MN, listed on the NRHP in Le Sueur County, Minnesota
- Trinity Chapel (Far Rockaway, New York), listed on the NRHP in New York
- Trinity Chapel, New York University
- Trinity Chapel Complex, New York, NY, listed on the NRHP in New York
- Reinholds Station Trinity Chapel, Reinholds, PA, listed on the NRHP in Pennsylvania

== See also ==
- Trinity College Chapel (disambiguation)
