= Clarence Irving =

Clarence Irving may refer to:

- Larry Irving (Clarence Irving Jr., born 1955), American lawyer
- Clarence L. Irving (1924–2014), American cultural activist
