= St. James Church (Queens) =

Church in Queens, New York

- Old St. James Church
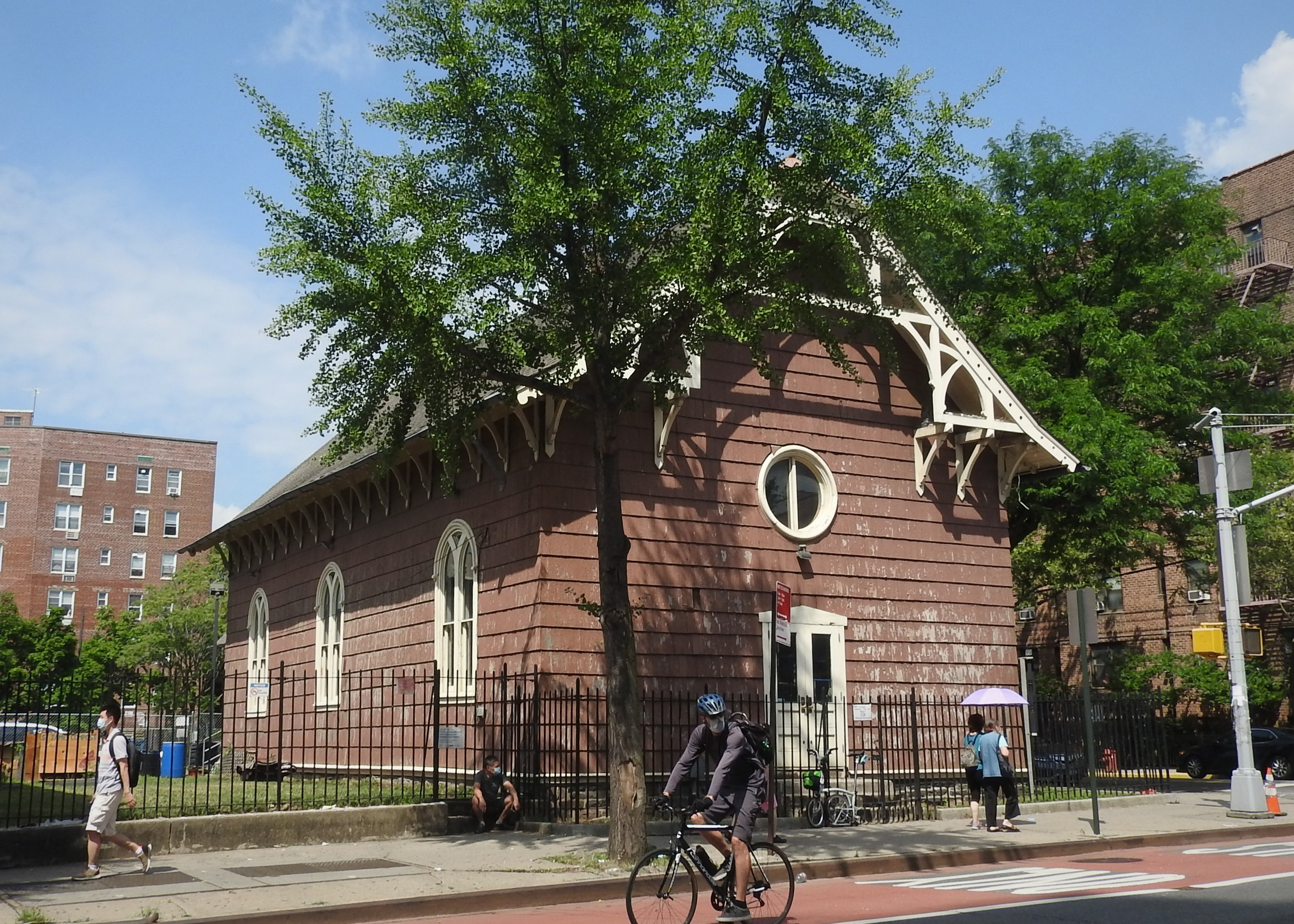
- Seen in July 2020

Religion
- Affiliation: Episcopal Church
- Ownership: Episcopal Diocese of Long Island
- Status: Used as community center only

Location
- Location: 86-02 Broadway, Elmhurst, Queens
- State: New York
- Country: United States
- Interactive map of St. James Church
- Coordinates: 40°44′18″N 73°52′40″W

Architecture
- Architect: James Moore
- Style: Colonial, Post-medieval English
- Established: 1704
- Groundbreaking: 1735
- Completed: 1736

Specifications
- Direction of façade: East
- Length: 58 feet (18 m) (main structure); 25 feet (7.6 m) (annex)
- Width: 30 feet (9.1 m) (main structure); 15 feet (4.6 m) (annex)
- Materials: Wood
- St. James Church
- U.S. National Register of Historic Places
- New York City Landmark
- Location: 86-02 Broadway, Elmhurst, New York
- Coordinates: 40°44′18″N 73°52′40″W
- Area: less than one acre
- Built: 1735–1736
- Architect: Moore, James, of Newton
- Architectural style: Colonial, Post-medieval English
- NRHP reference No.: 99001331
- NYCL No.: 2593

Significant dates
- Added to NRHP: November 12, 1999
- Designated NYCL: September 19, 2017

St. James Church (also known as Church of England in America, Mission Church at Newtown, St. James Protestant Episcopal Church, Parish Hall, and Community Hall) is a historic Episcopal church building at 86-02 Broadway in the Elmhurst neighborhood of Queens in New York City. It is the city's oldest surviving Anglican building and Church of England mission church. It is also alternatively called the Old St. James Church to distinguish it from the St. James Episcopal Church two blocks away.

Ever since Elmhurst was established in 1652 as the town of Middleburgh (later Newtown), it had been religiously diverse, although the Church of England became the Province of New York's official religion in 1693. The Mission Church at Newtowne was founded in 1704 as a mission of a parish based in Jamaica, Queens. The parish built its Newtown structure in 1735–1736 and became separate in 1761. The congregation used the building until a new church was built nearby in 1848, whereupon the old structure became a parish building. The church was extensively repaired and expanded several times in the 18th and 19th centuries, including a major expansion in 1883. The old church building was used as a parish hall and Sunday school until 1941 when a new parish hall was built behind the newer St. James Episcopal Church. Since then, it has been used by several community groups, and was restored in 2004.

St. James Church is designed in the English Colonial style and consists of the original main section and a rear section built in 1883. The interior features extensive carving and other decorative woodwork features. It was listed on the National Register of Historic Places in 1999. The New York City Landmarks Preservation Commission designated the church as a city landmark in 2017.

== History ==
=== Context ===
Elmhurst was established in 1652 as the town of Middleburgh, an outpost of the Dutch colony of New Amsterdam. The town's leaders had intended it to be a religiously diverse settlement. Soon after Middleburgh's establishment, a town building was erected to serve as both a community and religious building; it was located on the present-day Dongan Street near Broadway. Use of this building was shared by various religious denominations: the Church of England, the Dutch Reformed Church, the Presbyterians, and the Quakers. After the English gained control of New Amsterdam in 1665, they renamed Middleburgh to "Newtown"; subsequently, Newtown became part of Queens County in 1683. A new church for all of these denominations was built in 1669 near Grand Avenue and Queens Boulevard.

The Church of England became the Province of New York's official religion after the passage of the Ministry Act of 1693. As a consequence of the act, the parish of Jamaica was extended to cover the towns of Flushing and Newtown. Subsequently, the Society for the Propagation of the Gospel in Foreign Parts (SPG) became responsible for appointing the parish's Anglican rectors, who generally served multiple congregations at the time. The "Mission Church at Newtowne" was established in 1704 as a mission of the Jamaica parish. The Newtown parish's rector was William Urquhart until 1710, and the position was then taken by Thomas Poyer until 1731. The rector held services in Jamaica one week, and would then rotate the following weeks to Flushing and then Newtown. The community in Jamaica grew into Grace Church; the one in Flushing became St. George's; and the one in Newtown became St. James.

=== Construction and early years ===
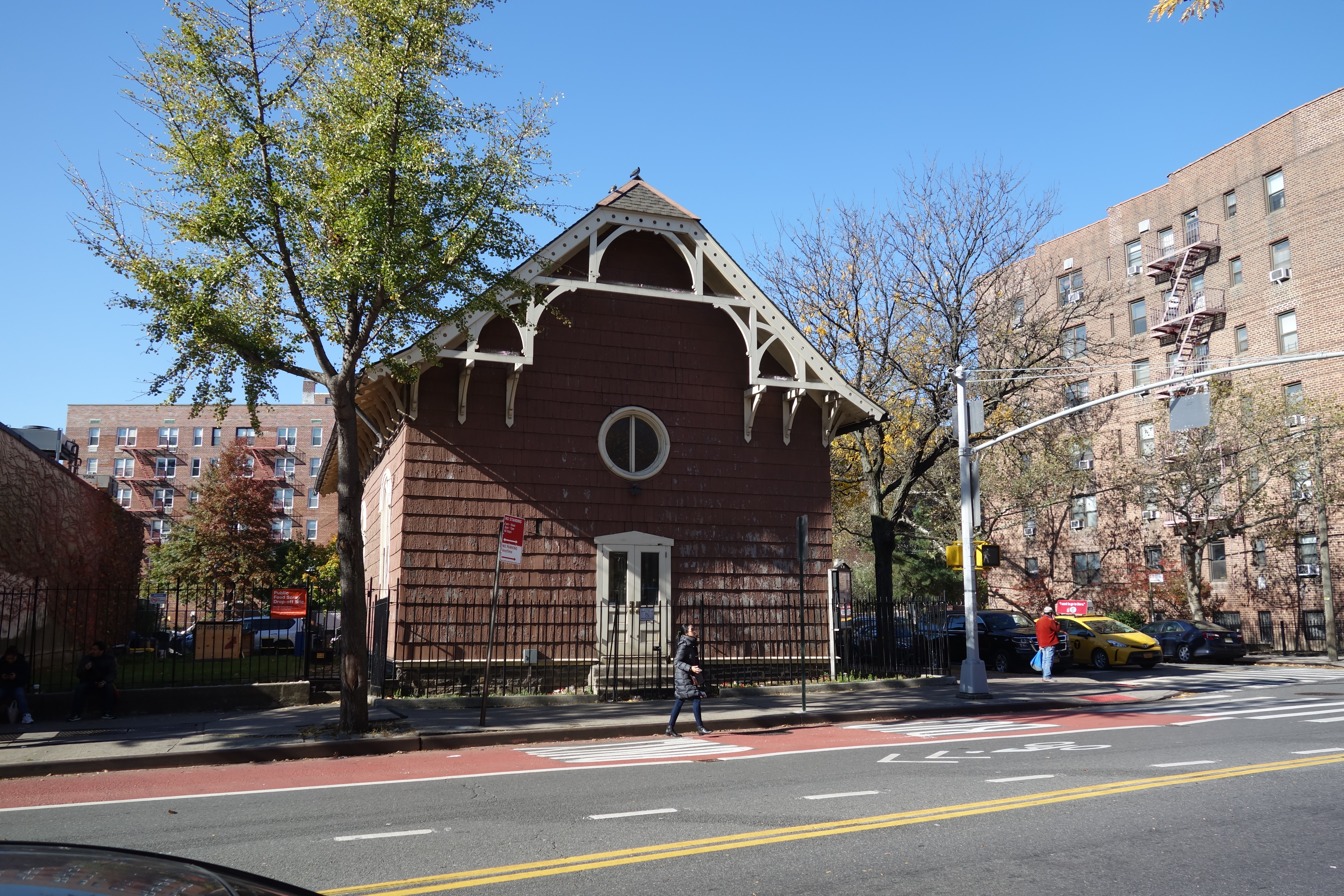
Seen from Broadway

Following the appointment of the Reverend Thomas Colgan as Jamaica rector in 1732, the number of congregants in the Mission Church at Newtown increased. A deed of land was requested from the Newtown government, and granted on April 19, 1733. The deed called for "twenty square rods" of land, which was equivalent to about 62.5 by 86.8 feet (19.1 by 26.5 m). Construction was delayed until funds were raised. Work began in early 1735 and was finished in 1736; records name Joseph Moore as the builder and James Renne Jr. as the carpenter. The pews were added in 1740.

As completed, the church building was "box-like" with wood shingles and round-arched windows, as well as a tower with a steeple and weather vane on its west. The main entrance was on the southern facade, and inside were boxed pews that could be locked. The boxed pews nearest the minister were generally reserved for the most important members of the community, while indentured servants, apprentices, slaves, and Native Americans were seated in the upper level of the tower. The structure in general was characteristic of colonial meeting houses in New England. Colgan remained rector until his death in 1755; Samuel Seabury was appointed as rector in 1757, serving until 1766.

Because of the church's rapid growth in the 1750s, the parishioners applied for a royal charter on September 2, 1761, and received autonomy on September 9. The parish was chartered as the Church of England Parish of Saint James, although it remained under the administration of the Jamaica parish. The charter included the acquisition of 0.25 acres (0.10 ha) behind the church for a cemetery. The same month, doctor Jacob Ogden deeded 12 acres (4.9 ha) to the parish, including a house; this land was located at 84-07 Broadway, two blocks north of the existing church, between St. James and Corona avenues. The original church building was modified: the southern-facade entrance was closed and replaced with two doors on the eastern facade, while the room in the church's western tower became the vestry room. The church building was further extended west in 1772.

=== American Revolution and 19th century ===
The last rector appointed by the SPG was Joshua Bloomer, who served from 1766 to 1790. The church survived through the American Revolutionary War, as Bloomer was allied with the Loyalists and the church was an Anglican church. Its communicants included the Commander-in-Chief of British land forces, William Howe, 5th Viscount Howe, as well as William IV, Duke of Clarence. At the end of the war, St. James Parish became part of the Protestant Episcopal Church of the United States. The corporate name was changed accordingly in 1793. The last rector to serve Flushing, Jamaica, and Newtown parishes was William Hammel who served from 1790 to 1795.

Because of disagreements over the glebe, St. James Parish removed its affiliation with the Jamaica parish in 1797. The first rector to serve Newtown exclusively was Henry Van Dyke, who was rector until 1802 or 1803. The parish donated land across Broadway for a school behind what is now the Elmhurst Library. In April 1803, St. James and St. George's merged again with Abraham L. Clarke serving as rector for both churches until 1809; Clarke remained rector at St. James until his death in 1810. The parish also gained a sizable financial endowment in 1809. Trinity Church in Manhattan, the Episcopal "Mother Church" in New York, gave three plots of land in Manhattan to the parish, including 56 Reade Street in the Civic Center of Manhattan. William E. Wyatt served as rector between 1812 and 1814, and then Evan Melborne Johnson until 1827; during Johnson's tenure, the church building was rehabilitated. George A. Shelton took up the position of rector in 1830 and remained in that position for 33 years. A $600 organ was placed in the church building in 1843.

=== Later use ===
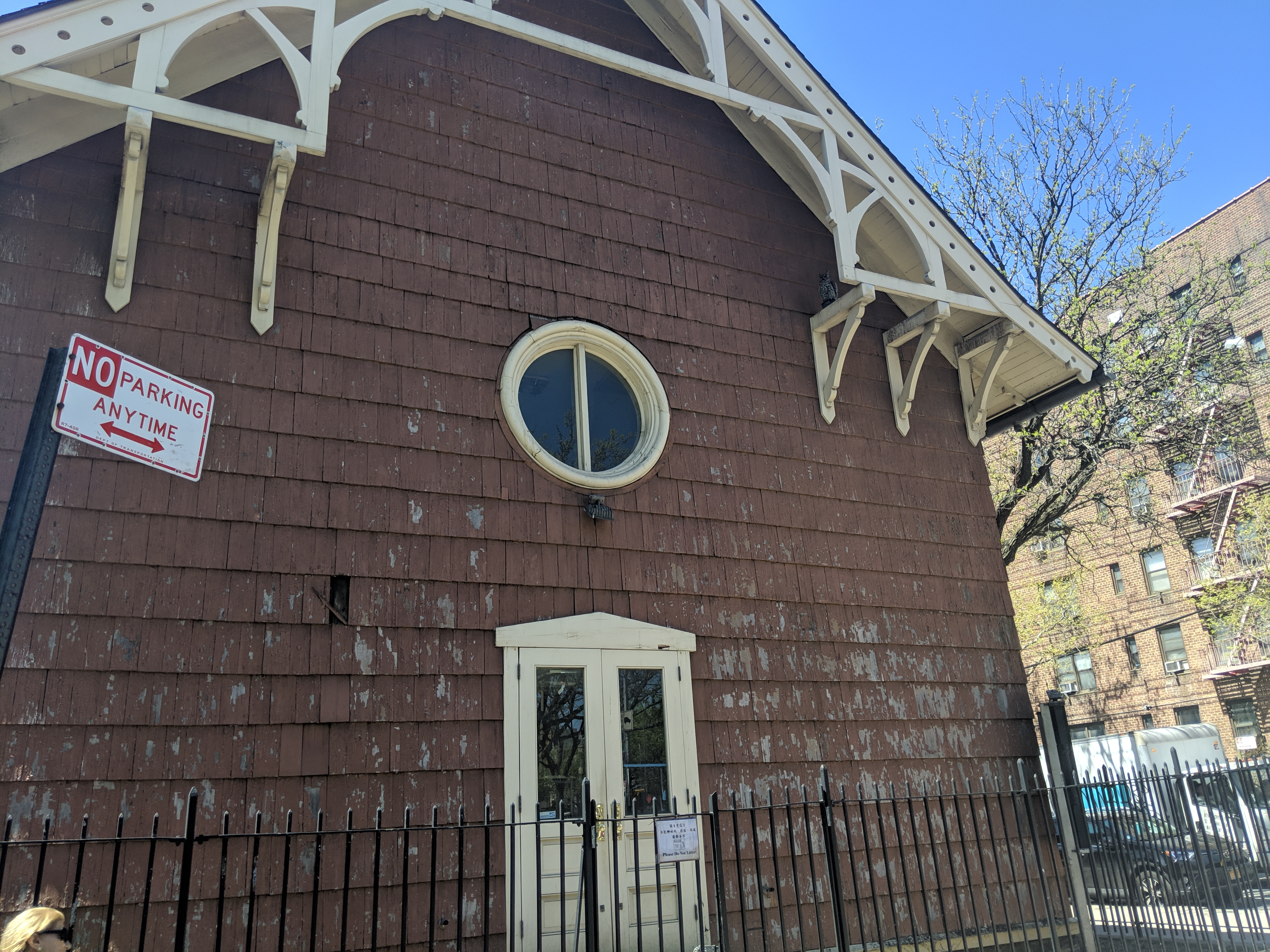
Closeup of the Broadway facade, seen in 2019

On July 16, 1848, the congregation held its last service at the building. The congregation moved to the St. James Episcopal Church, a wood Gothic Revival structure at 84-07 Broadway. (Note: The congregation of the modern St. James Episcopal Church remains at 84-07 Broadway, but the building there is not the original. The first building at 84-07 Broadway burned down in 1975 and was rebuilt the next year.) The graveyard at the old church remained in use until 1851, when most corpses were disinterred and relocated to the new church. Subsequently, the old St. James Church became a parish hall, and the pulpit was removed in 1861 when the old church building was turned into a Sunday school. St. James Parish became part of the Episcopal Diocese of Long Island when the latter was founded in 1868. The remaining graves at Old St. James Church's cemetery were disinterred in 1882, and old grave markers were removed. Additionally, between 1882 and 1883, the steeple of the old tower was taken down, and the rear annex was built on the site of the tower. The facade of the parish building was also rebuilt in the Gothic Revival style. The pews were replaced with benches, the paneling was reused as wainscoting, and all windows were replaced.

During the late 1890s, Newtown was renamed Elmhurst and became part of the City of Greater New York. Elmhurst started being developed as a commercial and residential neighborhood. Following a fire in 1924, electricity was installed and a restroom and kitchen were added. The church's lot was reduced in the 1920s when Reeder Street was constructed to the west, 51st Avenue was widened to the north, and Broadway was widened to the east. When the New York City Subway's underground Queens Boulevard Line was being built through the area in the 1920s and early 1930s, an easement was granted to the New York City Board of Transportation, which was digging the line under the church as part of the Independent Subway System. The city government attempted to take the church's former cemetery in the 1930s for the construction of a playground, under the argument that it was legally a town cemetery.

News articles through 1925 mention the old St. James Church being used as a chapel. It was used as a parish hall and Sunday school until 1941 when a new parish hall was built behind the newer St. James Episcopal Church. The parish building was used by the St. James Troop of the Boy Scouts of America from 1928 to 1953, and was used by the Boy Scouts, Girl Scouts and Brownies until the 1980s. The vestry refused a 1950s offer by the U.S. government to use the St. James Church for civilian defense, as well as an offer by the United States Postal Service to demolish the church for a post office in 1963.

During the late 20th century, the old St. James Church was variously occupied by Vietnam Veterans of America, Alcoholics Anonymous, the Indonesian Bethel Gospel Church, and a group for Chinese senior citizens. By the 1990s, the parish building was deteriorating. Father William Galer and architect Kaitsen Woo collectively secured $400,000 in funding to restore the building to its original condition, under plans prepared by Woo. The restoration was completed in 2004, the 300th anniversary of the parish. The rebuilt church is sparingly used as a community center.

== Architecture ==
St. James Church is located at the southwest corner of 51st Avenue and Broadway in Elmhurst. The church contains parking at the western end of its lot. The surrounding area is developed with apartments, houses, and stores. Historically, the church served the town of Newtown (later renamed Elmhurst), and it was on the north bank of the now-covered Horse Brook.

The church is designed in the English Colonial style and includes a main section built in 1735–1736 and a rear section built in 1883. The rear section replaced an 18th-century Colonial-style tower. The eastern section of the church was expanded in 1771 by the length of two bays. The lot measures 62.42 by 179.78 feet (19.03 by 54.80 m).

=== Facade ===
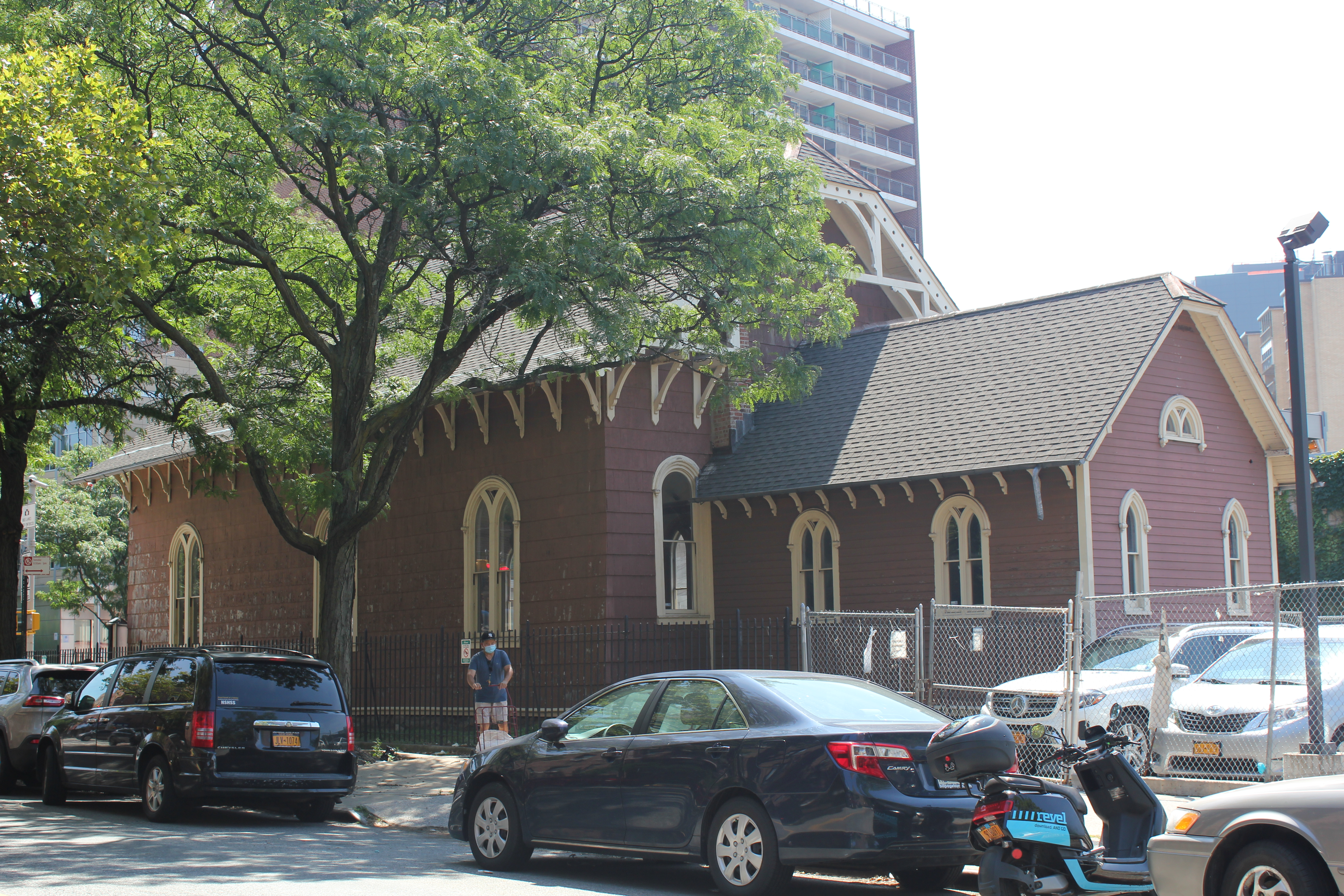
Seen from 51st Avenue

The main section of the church measures 58 by 30 feet (17.7 by 9.1 m), with its longer axis running west-east parallel to 51st Avenue. The facade is composed of cement asbestos shingles over wood shingles. The northern and southern facades each contain three round-arched window openings outfitted with lancet windows, while the eastern facade contains two round-arched window openings. The front entrance is on the eastern facade, facing Broadway, and is composed of double doors underneath a circular window measuring about 5 feet (1.5 m) in diameter. The roof is a gable roof with overhanging eaves supported by flared brackets. A brick chimney is located above the western section of the roof.

The annex to the west measures 25 by 15 feet (7.6 by 4.6 m). As with the main portion of the building, it has a gable roof with eaves overhanging the northern and southern facades. There are two lancet windows on the northern, western, and southern facades, as well as a semicircular window beneath the gable on the western facade. However, the material used in the facade is slightly different, with cement asbestos shingles on the northern and western facades, and plywood on the southern facade; the brackets beneath the roof are not flared. A basement is located underneath the annex. The western annex occupies the site of the church's former tower, which was topped by a steeple and a weather vane.

=== Interior ===
The main section has a barrel vaulted ceiling, which was built around 1816. Many of the wooden moldings from the 18th century remain; these include wainscoting on the northern, southern, and western walls, as well as an eastern gallery with wooden dentils, pilasters, and paneling. The original pine flooring was covered by fir in the early 20th century and then by vinyl flooring in the late 1980s. When the building was used as a church, it had an entrance on the southern facade, and a pulpit opposite the entrance that was accessed by a staircase. A choir gallery was on the east side of the church building.

The demolished tower had a "slave room" where indentured servants, apprentices, slaves, and Native Americans would sit. It was at the same level as the pulpit, with a window into the main section of the church.

== Landmark designation ==
The old St. James Church was added to the National Register of Historic Places in 1999. Preservationists then petitioned the New York City Landmarks Preservation Commission to make the building a city landmark, though the commission initially rejected the status. According to a letter written to state senator Tony Avella in 2015, the commission said that the designation was rejected because it "was significantly remodeled in 1883 and was resided in the 20th century leaving little historic fabric on the exterior". The Episcopal Diocese of Long Island expressed support for such a designation, and the commission agreed to hold another meeting to determine whether to grant the church landmark status. In September 2017, the original church at 86-02 Broadway was designated a city landmark. The commission stated that the church was historically significant as the second-oldest church still standing in New York City, behind the Old Quaker Meeting House in Flushing, as well as the oldest surviving Anglican building and Church of England mission church.

== See also ==
- List of New York City Designated Landmarks in Queens
- National Register of Historic Places listings in Queens, New York
