= St. George's Church (Queens) =

- U.S. National Register of Historic Places
- New York State Register of Historic Places
- New York City Landmark
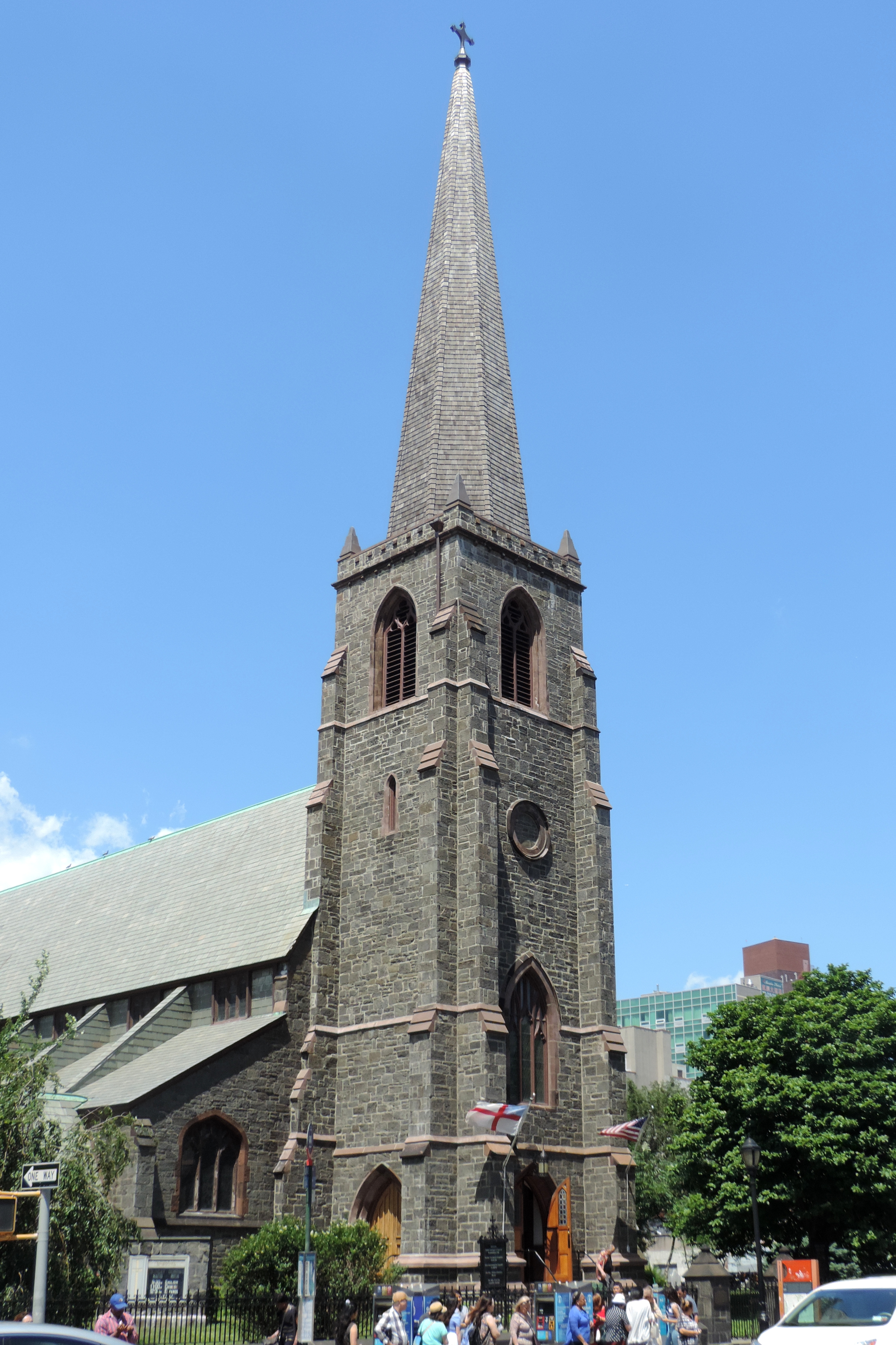
- 2016, with new steeple

- Location within New York City Location within New York Location within the United States
- Location: 135-32 38th Avenue, Flushing, Queens, New York 11354
- Coordinates: 40°45′37″N 73°49′52″W
- Area: 1.5 acres (0.61 ha)
- Built: 1854
- Architect: Henry C. Dudley and Frank Wills
- Architectural style: Neo-Gothic
- Website: www.stgeorges1702.org
- NRHP reference No.: 08000143
- NYSRHP No.: 08101.007194
- NYCL No.: 2053

Significant dates
- Added to NRHP: March 7, 2008
- Designated NYSRHP: January 15, 2008
- Designated NYCL: February 8, 2000

St. George's Church is an intercultural, multilingual Episcopal congregation in Flushing, Queens, New York City. With members from over twenty different nations of origin, it has served an ever-changing congregation since the 18th century. The current church building, constructed in 1854, is a New York City designated landmark on the National Register of Historic Places.

== History ==
St. George's was organized in 1702 as a mission of the Church of England by the Society for the Propagation of the Gospel in Foreign Parts. The group consisted of the Rev. George Keith, the Rev. John Talbot, and the Rev. Patrick Gordon, who was sent to be the missionary to Jamaica, Queens. Keith, a former Quaker, went into Flushing's Quaker Meeting House in September 1702, announced his presence as a missionary, and engaged in both preaching and debate. This happened several times, and the subsequent early history of St. George's is intertwined with the history of Grace Church in Jamaica, which was where the first Rector, the Rev. Patrick Gordon, resided. Gordon was succeeded in 1704 by the Rev. William Urquhart. Urquhart held services in Jamaica one week, and would then rotate the following weeks to Flushing and then Newtown (now Elmhurst). The community in Jamaica grew into Grace Church; the one in Flushing became St. George's; and the one in Newtown became St. James.

Services were conducted in the old Guard House until 1746 when the first church building was constructed. A certain "John Aspinwall, Gentleman" donated £600 for a steeple and bell in 1760. Francis Lewis, a signer of the Declaration of Independence, was a Warden at St. George's Church, 1765–1790, and his son, Francis Lewis Jr., was a Warden from 1791-1794. The official union of the three parishes lasted for a century, and ended with the resignation of the Rev. Rattoone, when the vestry of St. George's decided to unite with Newtown in hiring the Rev. Abraham L. Clarke in 1803. In 1809, the Rev. Clarke withdrew to Newtown, leaving Flushing without a rector and marking St. George's independence.

A second church was built in 1821 and the present church structure, the third on the site, was built in 1854. It was designed by Henry C. Dudley (1813–1894) and Frank Wills (1822–1857), architects who were associated with the New York Ecclesiological Society, in the Neo-Gothic style. The great tower bell was recast at Troy, New York, using the metal from the original bell, and still bore the inscription "The gift of John Aspinwall, Gentleman, 1760." The parish received a Royal Charter from King George III of Great Britain, dated June 17, 1761. After the American Revolution, the "Prayer for the King" in the church's prayer book was covered over with the "Prayer for the President."

As church attendance and membership began to decline and the population of Flushing changed with the influx of immigrants from Latin America and Asia, St. George's began to reach out to the new immigrants. In 1988, the Rev. Dr. Franco Kwan was hired to provide outreach to the Asian community and to be the Vicar for the Chinese-speaking members of the congregation. Similarly, a part-time priest from another parish in the diocese was brought in to be the Vicar for the Spanish-speaking members of the congregation. Over the years, some critics have pointed out that the three bodies that make up St. George's (i.e., English-, Chinese-, and Spanish-speaking congregations) share a building but do not interact enough. Because of his success in revitalizing the parish, the vestry of St. George's attempted to hire the Rev. Dr. Franco Kwan as its permanent Rector in October 1996, and the New York Times even published an article about the new Rector. Fr. Kwan's appointment, however, was rejected by the Rt. Rev. Orris G. Walker, Jr., Bishop of the Episcopal Diocese of Long Island. Subsequently, three clergy from the diocese and twenty members of St. George's congregation signed a canon law complaint against Bishop Walker, alleging that the Bishop violated the Constitution and Canons of the General Convention of the Episcopal Church. Bishop Walker denied the charges, and a Review Panel of Bishops appointed by the Episcopal Church's Presiding Bishop ruled in favor of Bishop Walker. A motion to reconsider the decision was denied. The parish continues to hold trilingual services to mark special occasions, with readings done in English, Chinese, and Spanish, and copies of sermons distributed in those languages.

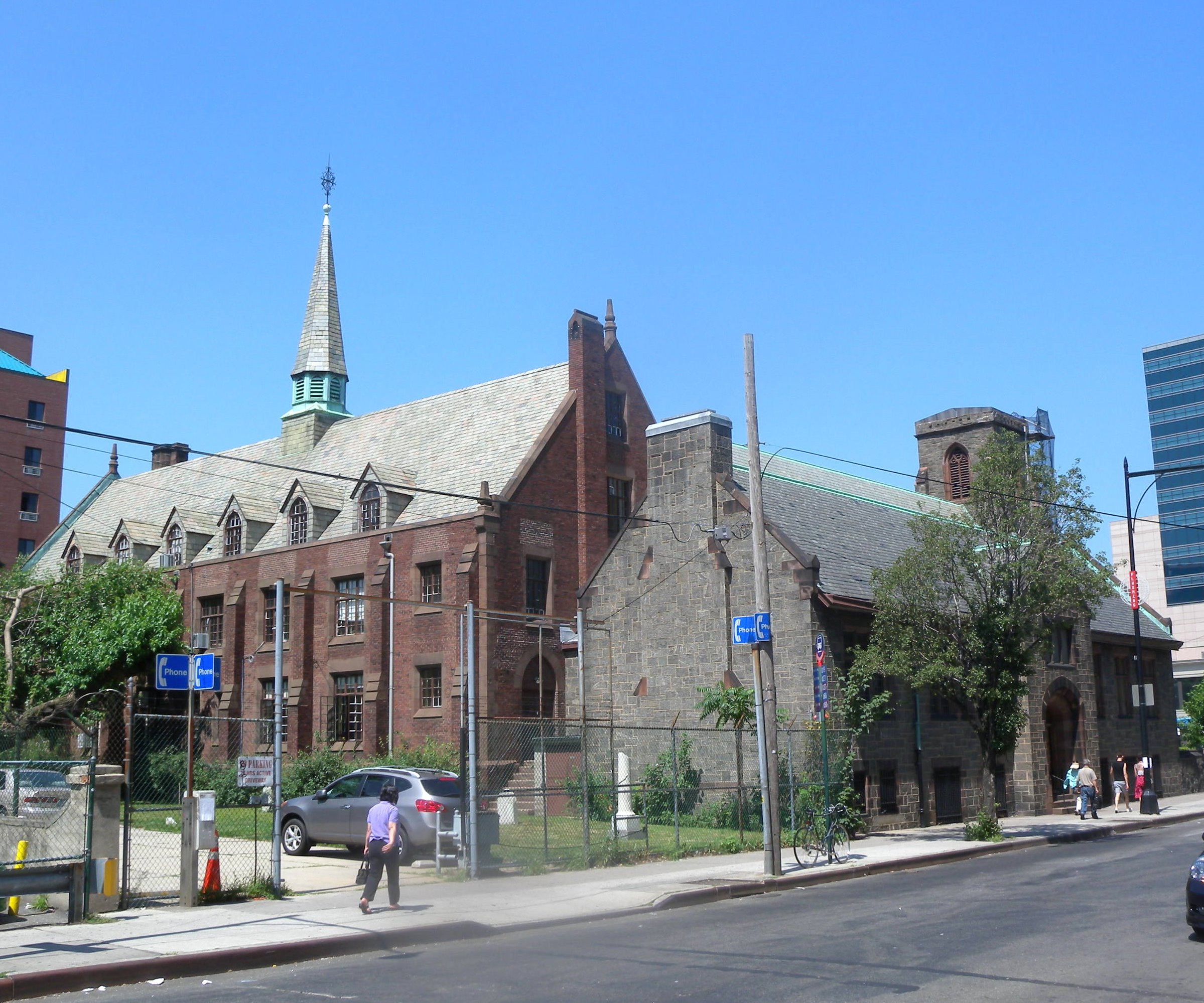
Parish House and church, when the steeple was missing

The church, the Old Parish House and the Graveyard along the side of the church were officially designated as City Landmarks by the New York City Landmarks Preservation Commission in 2000. St. George's celebrated its tercentenary in 2002.

The September 16, 2010 microburst across Brooklyn and Queens destroyed the church's 45-foot wooden steeple which crashed down on top of two New York City buses parked on Main Street. It is unknown whether the destruction was caused by the 100+ mph winds or a reported lightning strike. It was rebuilt in 2013.

The church houses a pipe organ that was built in 1922 by the Ernest Skinner Organ Company of Boston, Massachusetts. In 1952, the original Skinner instrument (Opus 355) was revised by Aeolian Skinner, successor to the Skinner company. The instrument consists of 37 ranks of pipes distributed across four manual keyboards and pedalboard. Phillip R. Lamb has served as Director of Music and Organist since 2015.

== See also ==
- List of New York City Designated Landmarks in Queens
- National Register of Historic Places listings in Queens County, New York
