= Worksman Cycles =

American bicycle manufacturer

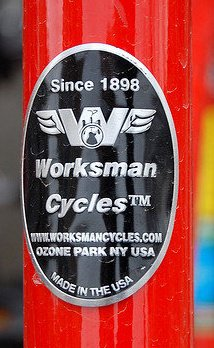
Worksman Cycles head badge

Worksman Cycles is a family-owned American manufacturer of bicycles and tricycles for industrial, commercial and recreational use. The company was founded in 1898 and is headquartered in Ozone Park in the borough of Queens in New York City. Previously in the Spear Building the company also operates an additional factory in Conway, South Carolina. Worksman is the oldest bicycle manufacturer in the United States and has operated its own factory-direct e-commerce store since 2004.

== History ==
The company was founded by Morris Worksman, who began building cycles for local deliveries in New York City. Later, he built tricycles for the Good Humor Ice Cream Company with an ice cream cooler on the front.

== Products ==
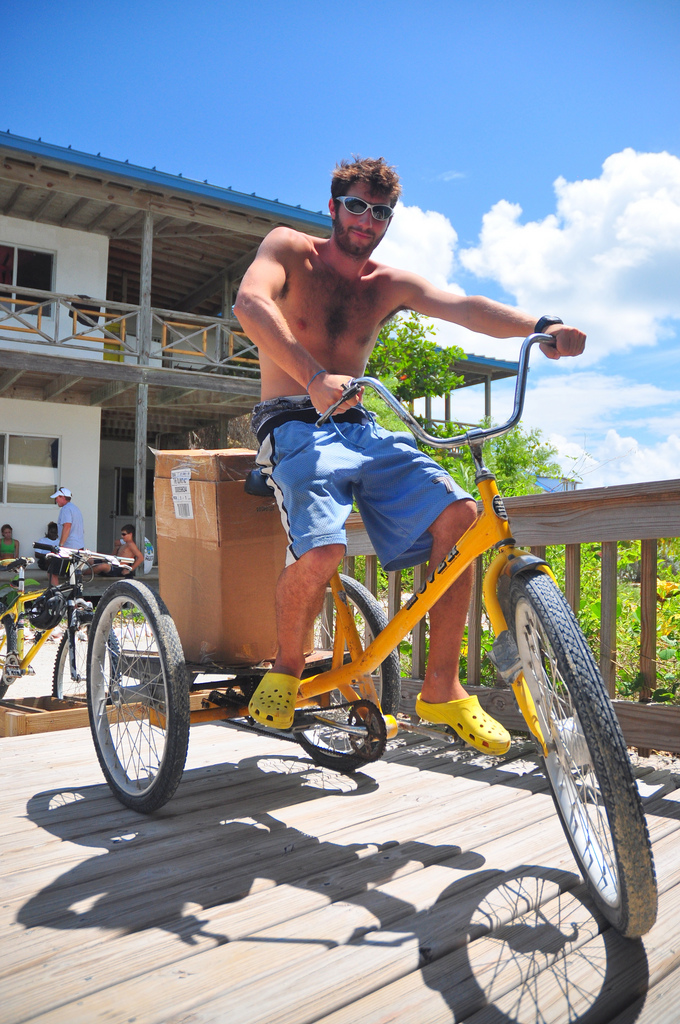
Worksman Industrial Mover Tricycle

Worksman is best known today for building cycles for industrial use that enable workers to travel around large industrial plants and warehouses, with some models allowing significant cargo weight. Worksman heavy-duty bicycles and tricycles are often used at commercial facilities and on airport tarmacs. Worksman markets its industrial products as a more energy efficient, healthful alternative to gas-powered transportation vehicles.

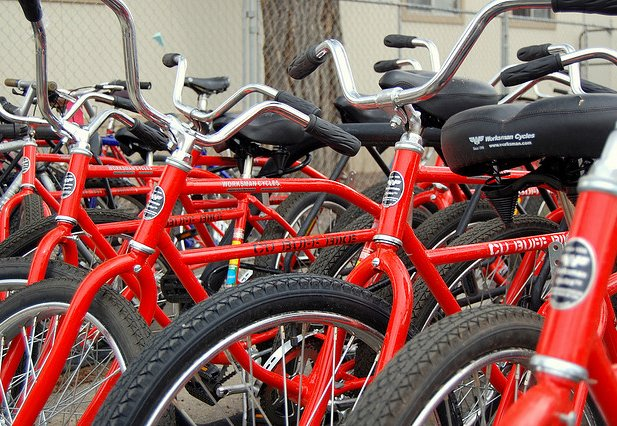
Worksman bike share fleet

The company also builds consumer-grade specialty products. Worksman Cycles offers numerous tricycles specifically designed for adult riders, including folding trikes. Worksman gears its products towards riders of all sizes, shapes, and ability levels. Specialty items include a two-seat side by side trike and a low rider semi-recumbent tricycle. Worksman offers classic retro-styled heavy duty cruiser bicycles used by bike share programs in cities and universities, owing to their heavy-duty nature. Worksman bikes can also be found at boardwalk bike rental shops and bike tour operators. Every Worksman model offers numerous customization options and is built-to-order. Certain Worksman models are available at retail outlets; however, the company primarily conducts its business in direct-to-consumer fashion.

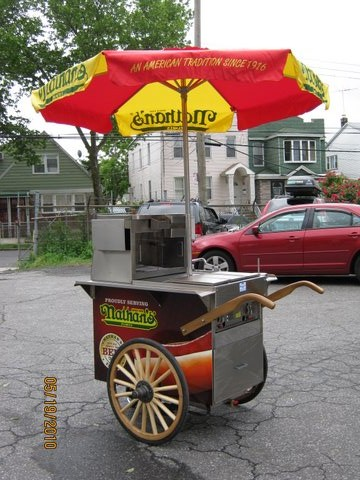
Worksman branded Nathan's hot dog cart

Worksman has a division that fabricates stainless steel food vending pushcarts and trucks, such as the New York City hot dog cart. With few bicycles manufactured in the U.S. after the 20th century, Worksman Cycles is a unique company in that it still welds, paints and assembles bicycles and adult tricycles in New York City. Worksman also owns the Atlantic Coast Cruiser brand which imports traditional cruiser bicycles from China.

== Gallery ==
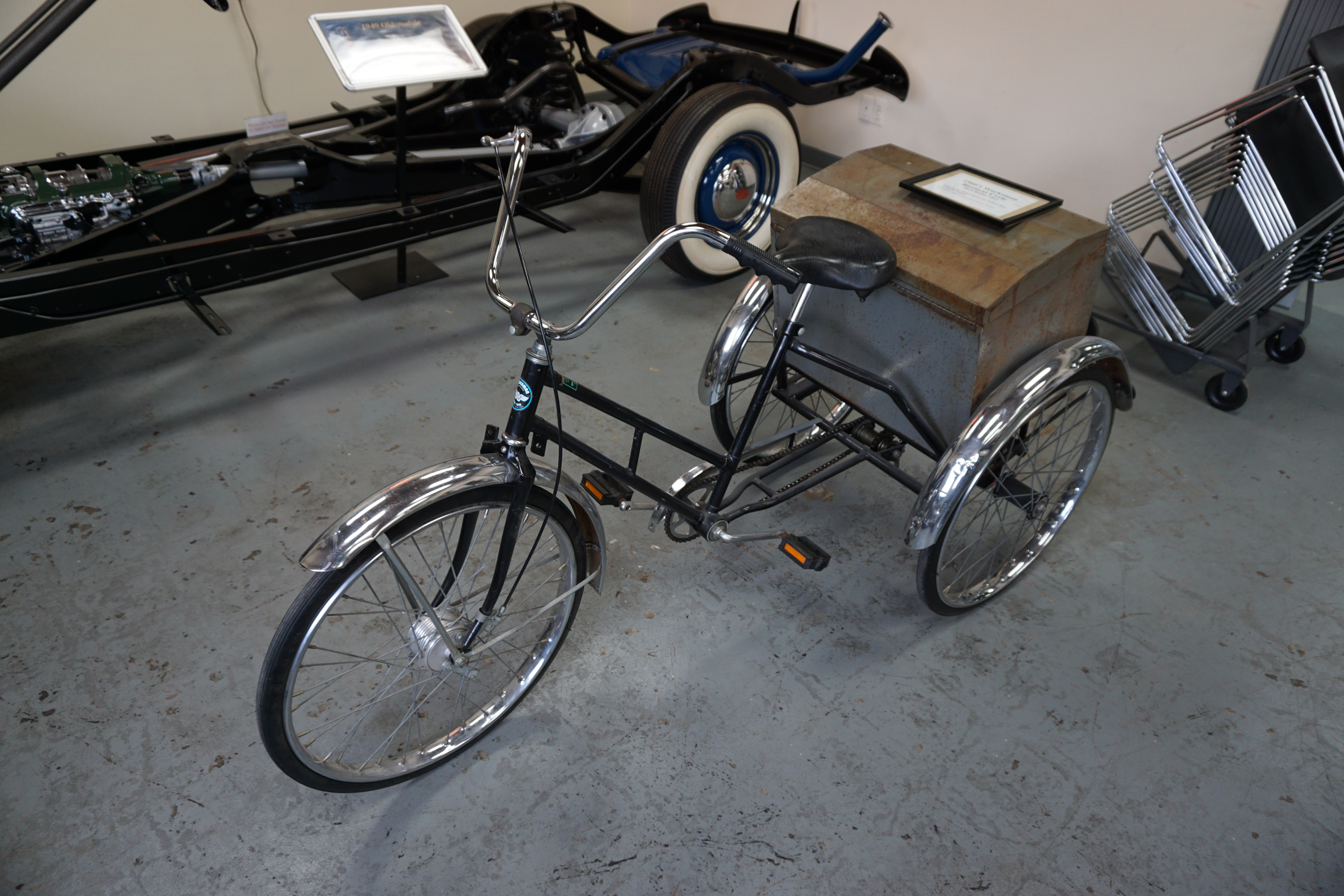
1960s Worksman Business Cycle

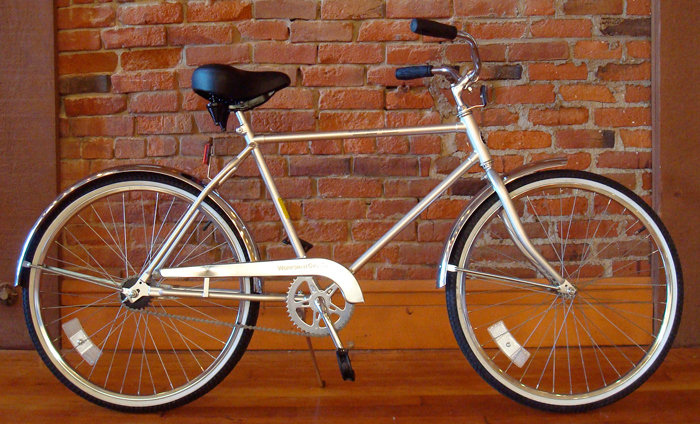
Worksman Cruiser

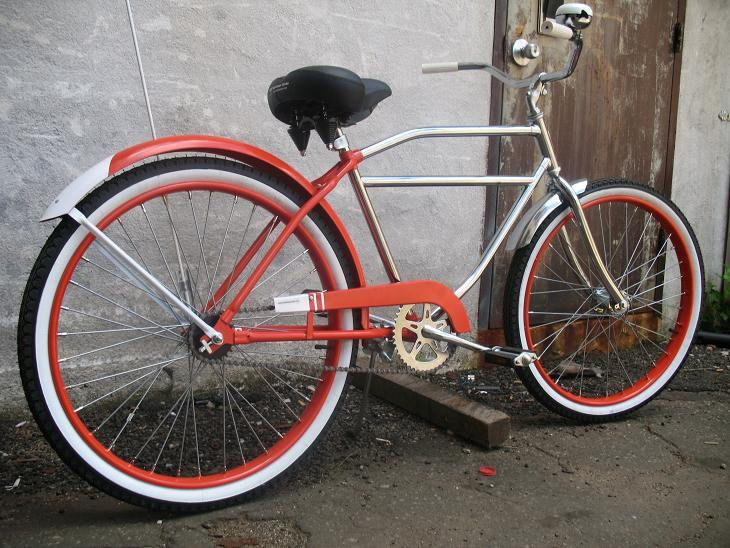
Worksman B-Series Cruiser

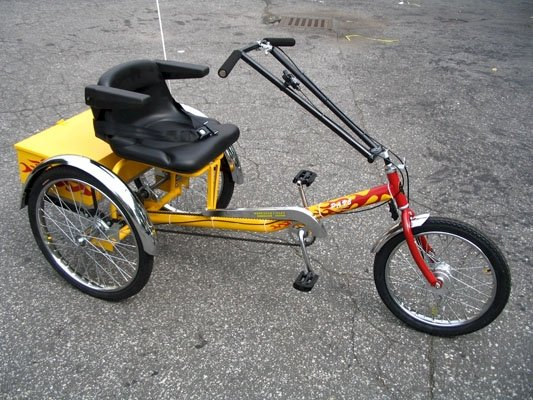
Worksman Personal Activity Vehicle
