= Spear and Company Factory =

- U.S. National Register of Historic Places
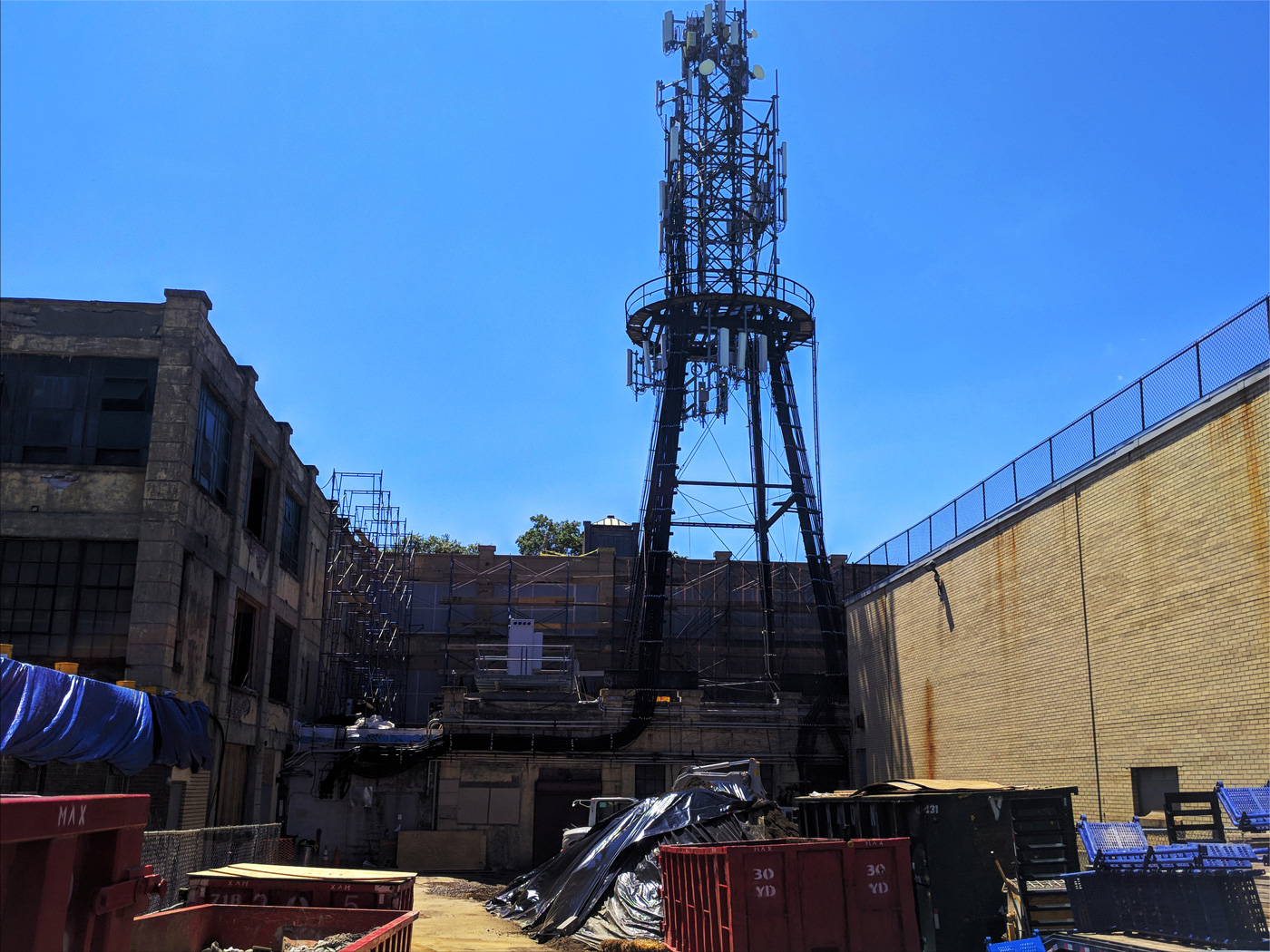
- Looking west into interior view of cellular tower infrastructure

- Location within New York City
- Location: 94-15 100th Street., Queens, New York City
- Coordinates: 40°41′19″N 73°50′38″W
- Built: 1906
- Architectural style: Cast-in-place reinforced concrete
- NRHP reference No.: 100001807
- Added to NRHP: November 17, 2017

The Spear Building is an 85,000-square-foot, four-story building that was a hat factory and wax novelty manufacturer in its 1920s heyday. It is located at 94-15 100th Street, between 94th and 95th Avenues one block from in the Woodhaven neighborhood of Queens, New York City, and is best known as the location of the Worksman Cycles Factory, a manufacturer of iconic pushcarts, tricycles and heavy duty bicycles.

The building was listed on the New York State Register of Historic Places in 2017. The same year, it was added to the National Register of Historic Places as an example of an intact early 20th-century reinforced concrete factory complex.

== Original use ==
The Regal Hat company of Chicago and the Spear Company of New York merged on May 1, 1920, to become the Regal-Spear Co., manufacturers of cloth headwear and children's novelties. The Spear company experienced labor unrest later in 1920 when the labor force was locked out of the Woodhaven factory in Ozone Park, Queens. At the time the company was listed as serving 22,000 customers.

The factory building on 100 St., was once home to Regal-Spear Co., which produced hats and was touted as the largest cloth headwear house in the world. It was also home to the Columbia Wax Products Co., a manufacturer of novelty candles. It was later home to the Worksman bicycle manufacturer. Constructed in 1906 for Spear & Company, was one of the first cast-in-place concrete structures in New York City.

== Present ==
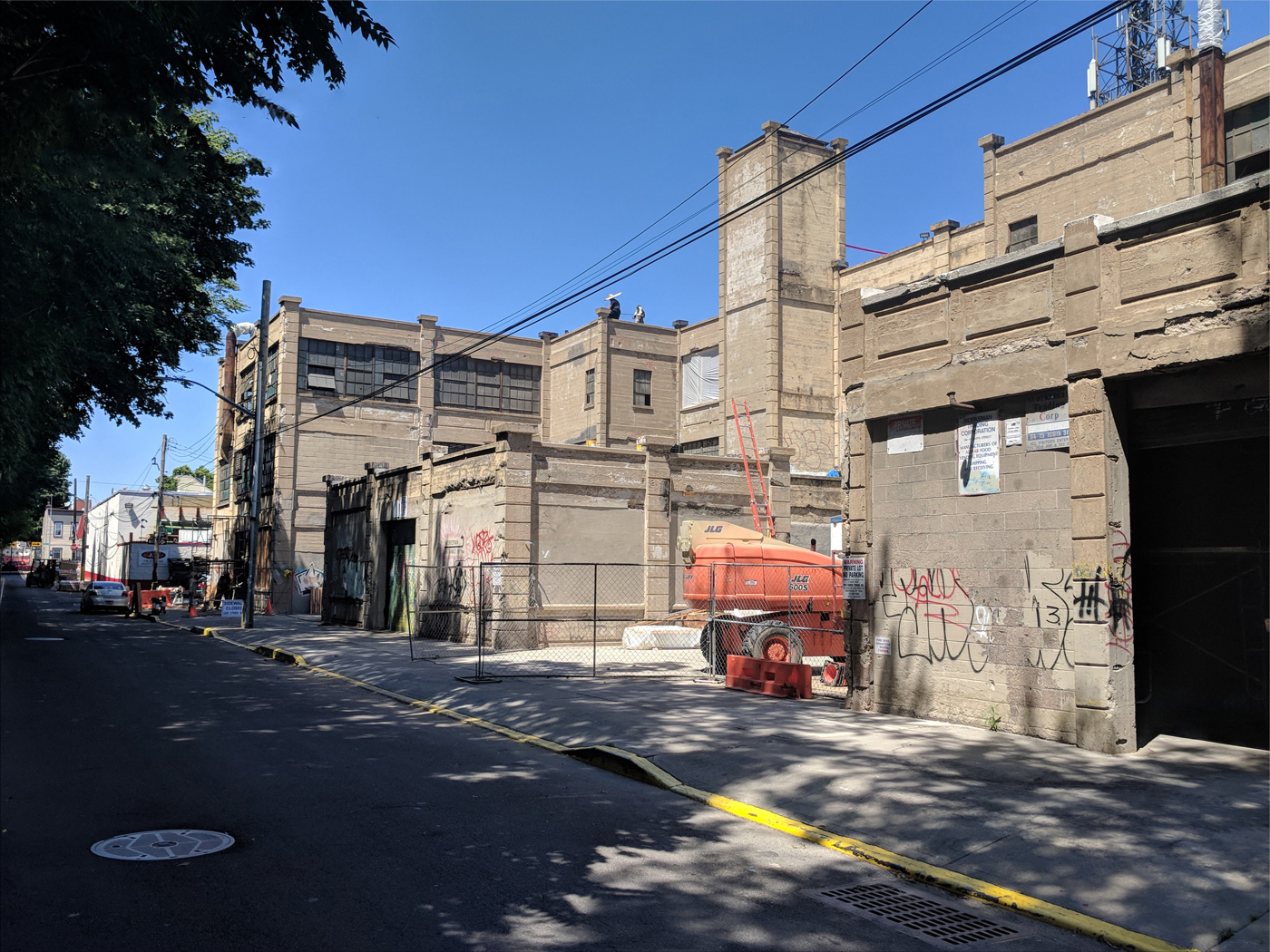

A report prepared by Gregory Dietrich Preservation Consulting, a landmark preservation group, described the building's architecture and stated its historical value qualified it for historic registry status. The report concluded, "The Spear & Company factory is not only significant for embodying the practical benefits of reinforced-concrete factory construction, but also for its simplicity and utility as exhibited by a restrained eclectic utilitarian design." The designation, which is largely honorific, will help ensure the former Hat factory's long-term preservation.

The status also makes property owners eligible for tax credits to rehabilitate the structures. State Rehabilitation Tax Credits in New York, Connecticut, Delaware and Maryland offer state tax credits as an added incentive for rehabilitating National Register listed properties. In New York State, for example, owners of commercial properties or owner-occupied residential properties listed on the National Register that are located in eligible census tracts have the potential to capture 20% after-tax credits for qualified rehabilitative expenses related to their property's redevelopment.

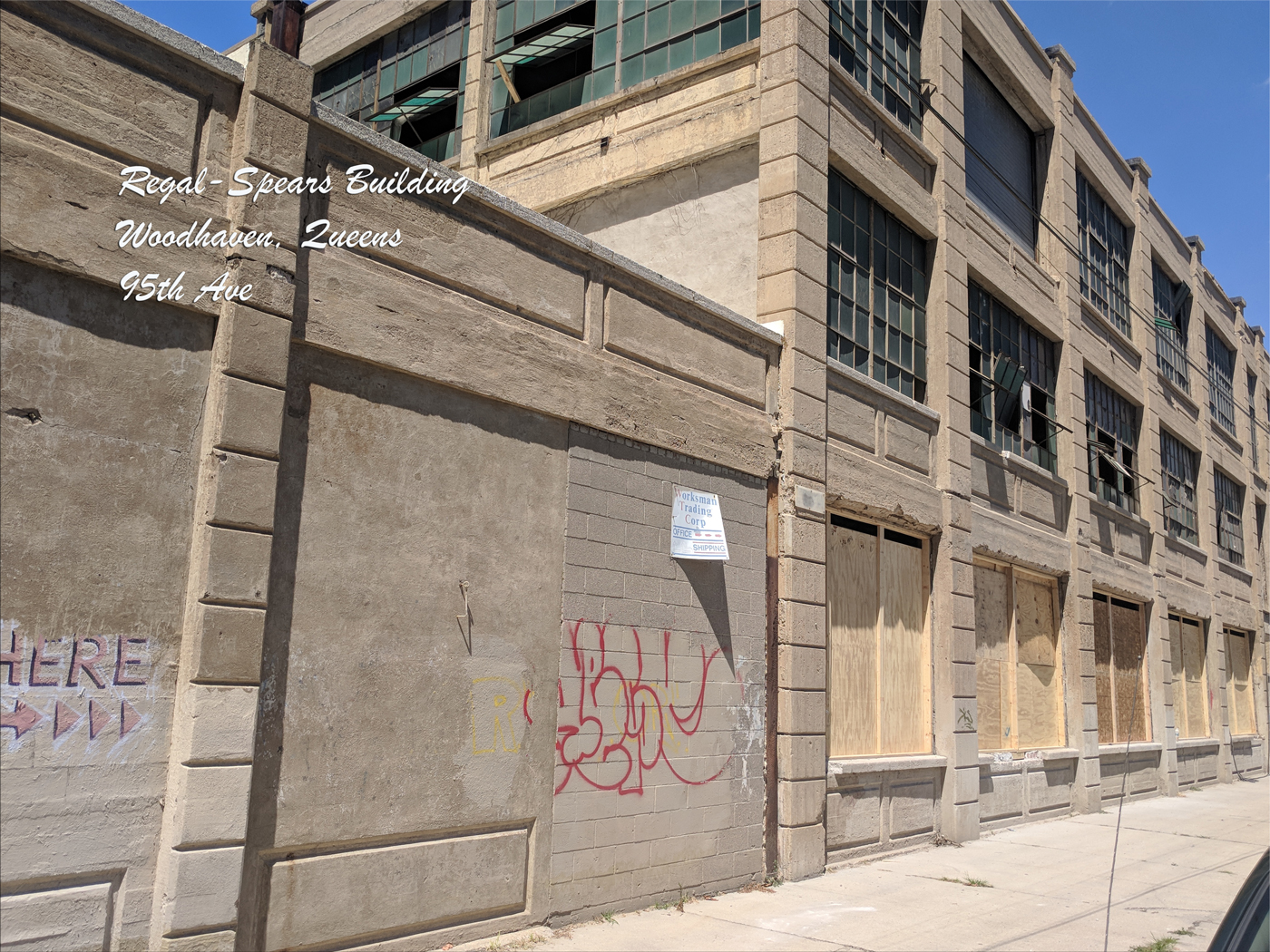

Andrew Cuomo, New York state governor designated the site eligible for historical status in 2017 along with 20 others, announcing "The Empire State proudly celebrates its diverse culture and rich heritage, and with the addition of these significant sites to the Registers of Historic Places, we will continue to honor all of the great things that make New York, New York," The statement had designated 21 sites around New York state. "Listing these landmarks will honor the contributions made by so many New Yorkers throughout our vast history, and helps advance efforts to preserve and improve these important historic sites for future generations."

The city Economic Development Corp. announced in 2016 the site will be rehabilitated to accommodate 24 businesses and 80 skilled workers due to a $10 million grant and $3.7 million loan from the EDC.

The businesses that will work out of the space are expected to employ woodworkers, set builders, metal workers, home goods manufacturers and more at an average salary of $51,500 per year, based on EDC projections.

== Cell tower ==
The site is also home to a 95-foot tall cellular re-transmission tower that stands above the surrounding wood-frame homes and trees of the adjacent abandoned right of way of the Rockaway Beach Branch. The gutting of the interior was completed, and new roofing was installed in July 2018. The building will be LEED certified and will incorporate 12,000 square feet (1,100 m^{2}) of photovoltaic panels to offset tenants' electrical costs. Greenpoint Manufacturing and Design Center has acquired $40 million in funding to complete the rehabilitation. The site will be called the GMDC Ozone Park Industrial Center.

== See also ==
- National Register of Historic Places listings in Queens, New York
