= United States Post Office (Jamaica, Queens) =

Historic post office in Queens, New York

- US Post Office-Jamaica Main
- U.S. National Register of Historic Places
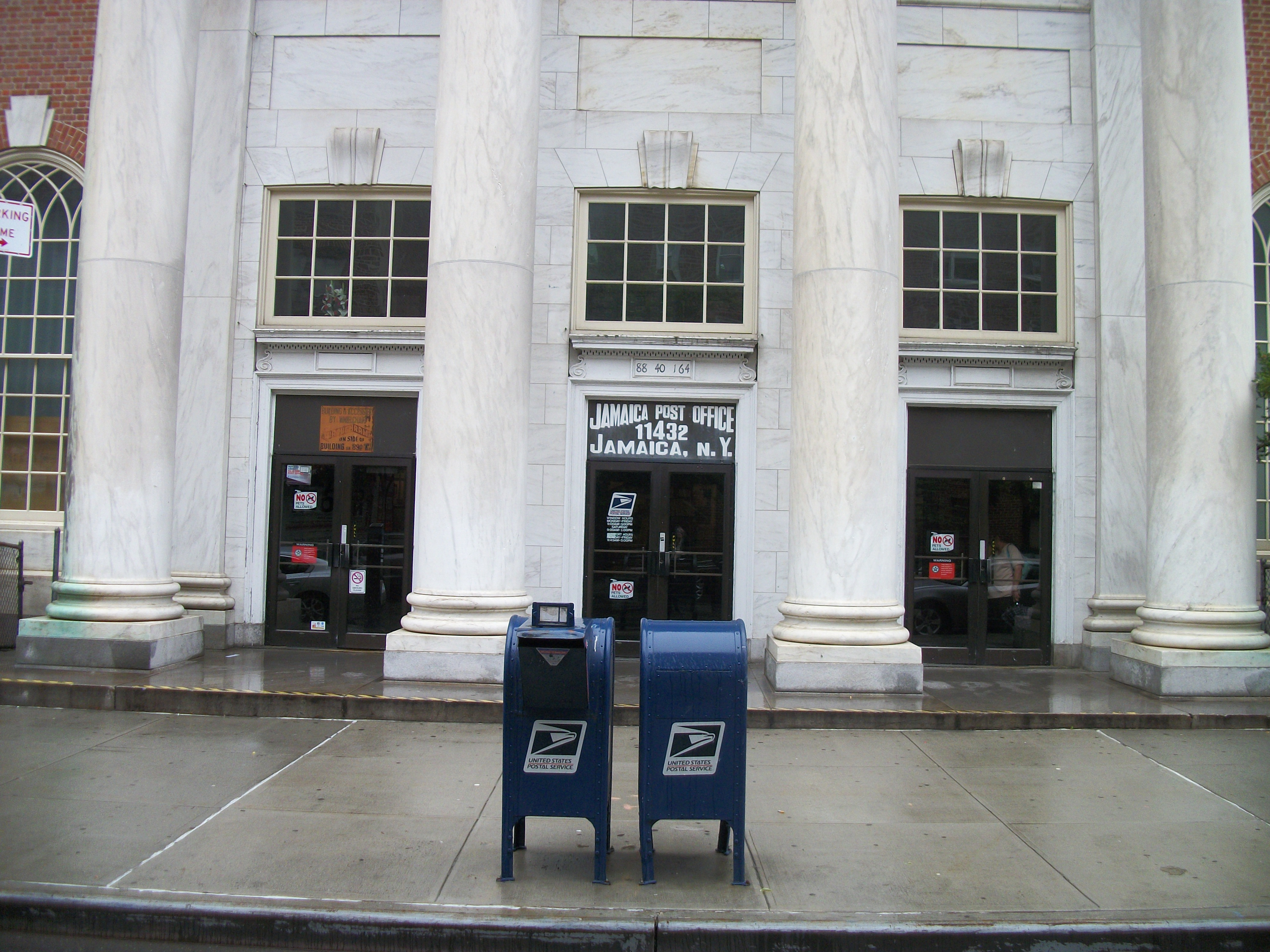
- The front entrance of the Main Post office in Jamaica, Queens on 164th Street.

- Location within New York City Location within New York Location within the United States
- Location: 8840 164th St., Jamaica, Queens
- Coordinates: 40°42′27.5″N 73°47′51″W
- Area: 1.2 acres (0.49 ha)
- Built: 1932
- Architect: Cross & Cross; U.S. Treasury Department
- Architectural style: Colonial Revival
- MPS: US Post Offices in New York State, 1858-1943, TR
- NRHP reference No.: 88002335
- Added to NRHP: November 17, 1988

US Post Office-Jamaica Main is a historic post office building located at the northwest corner of 164th Street and 89th Avenue in Jamaica in Queens, New York, United States. It serves the 11432 ZIP Code. It was built in 1932–1934, and is one of two post offices in New York City designed by the architects Cross & Cross as a consultant to the Office of the Supervising Architect. The building is a two-story brick building on a light gray granite base with marble trim in the Colonial Revival style. It features a handsome marble portico supported by four Ionic order columns.

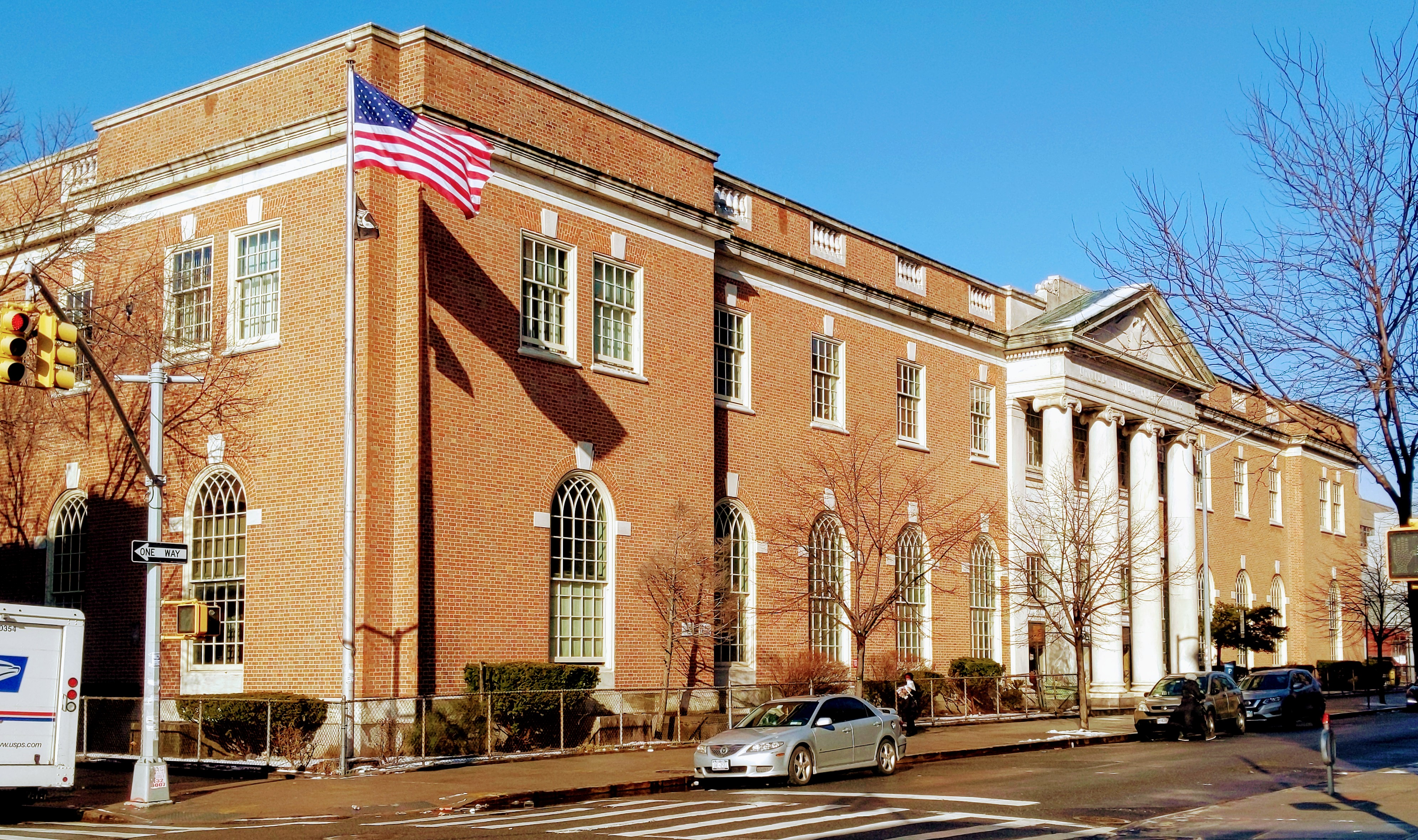
Jamaica NY 11432

The building in 2007 was renamed in honor of Clarence L. Irving. It was listed on the National Register of Historic Places in 1988.

== See also ==
- National Register of Historic Places listings in Queens, New York
