= Trinity Chapel (Queens) =

- U.S. National Register of Historic Places
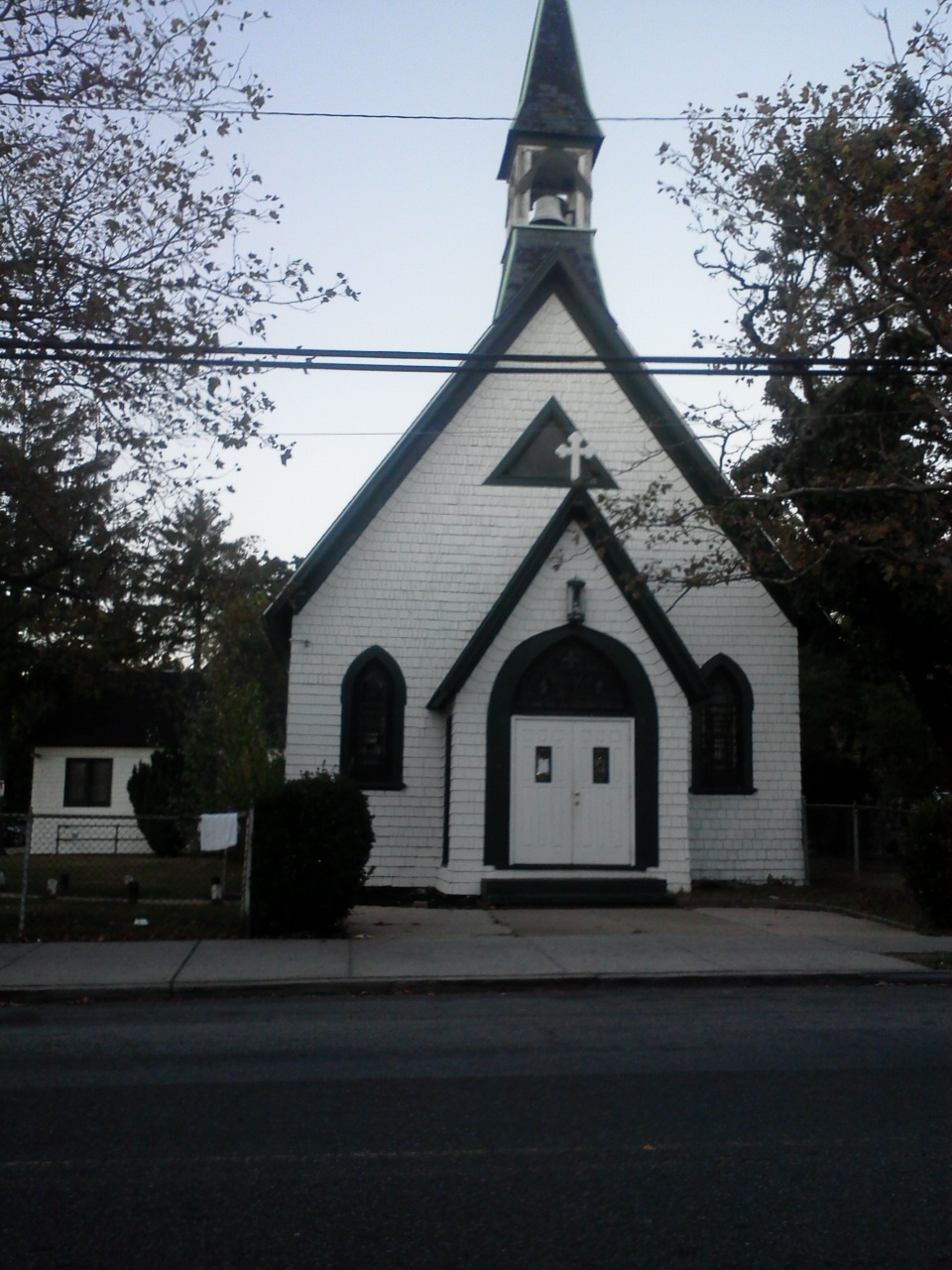
- Trinity Chapel, September 2013

- Location within New York City Location within New York Location within the United States
- Location: 1874 Mott Avenue; Far Rockaway, New York
- Coordinates: 40°36′13″N 73°45′5″W
- Area: 1.6 acres (0.65 ha)
- Built: 1858
- Architect: Upjohn, Richard
- Architectural style: Gothic Revival
- NRHP reference No.: 01001445
- Added to NRHP: January 11, 2002

Trinity Chapel, also known as St. John's Church and Beth-El Temple Church of God in Christ, is a historic Episcopal church at 1874 Mott Avenue in Far Rockaway, Queens, New York. It was built in 1858 to the design of architect Richard Upjohn (1802–1878). It is a frame Gothic Revival style chapel on a brick foundation and three bays wide by five bays long. It has a steeply pitched roof and sided in wood shingles. Atop the roof is a wooden belfry with steeply pitched pyramidal roof. It was founded as Trinity Chapel as a mission of Trinity Church in Hewlett, New York. Its name was changed to St. John's of Far Rockaway in 1881 when it became an independent parish. St. John's merged with Trinity Church in 1974 and the building was sold the following year to Beth-El Temple Church of God in Christ.

It was listed on the National Register of Historic Places in 2002.

== See also ==
- National Register of Historic Places listings in Queens, New York
