= Grove–Linden–St. John's Historic District =

Historic district in Queens, New York

- U.S. National Register of Historic Places
- U.S. Historic district
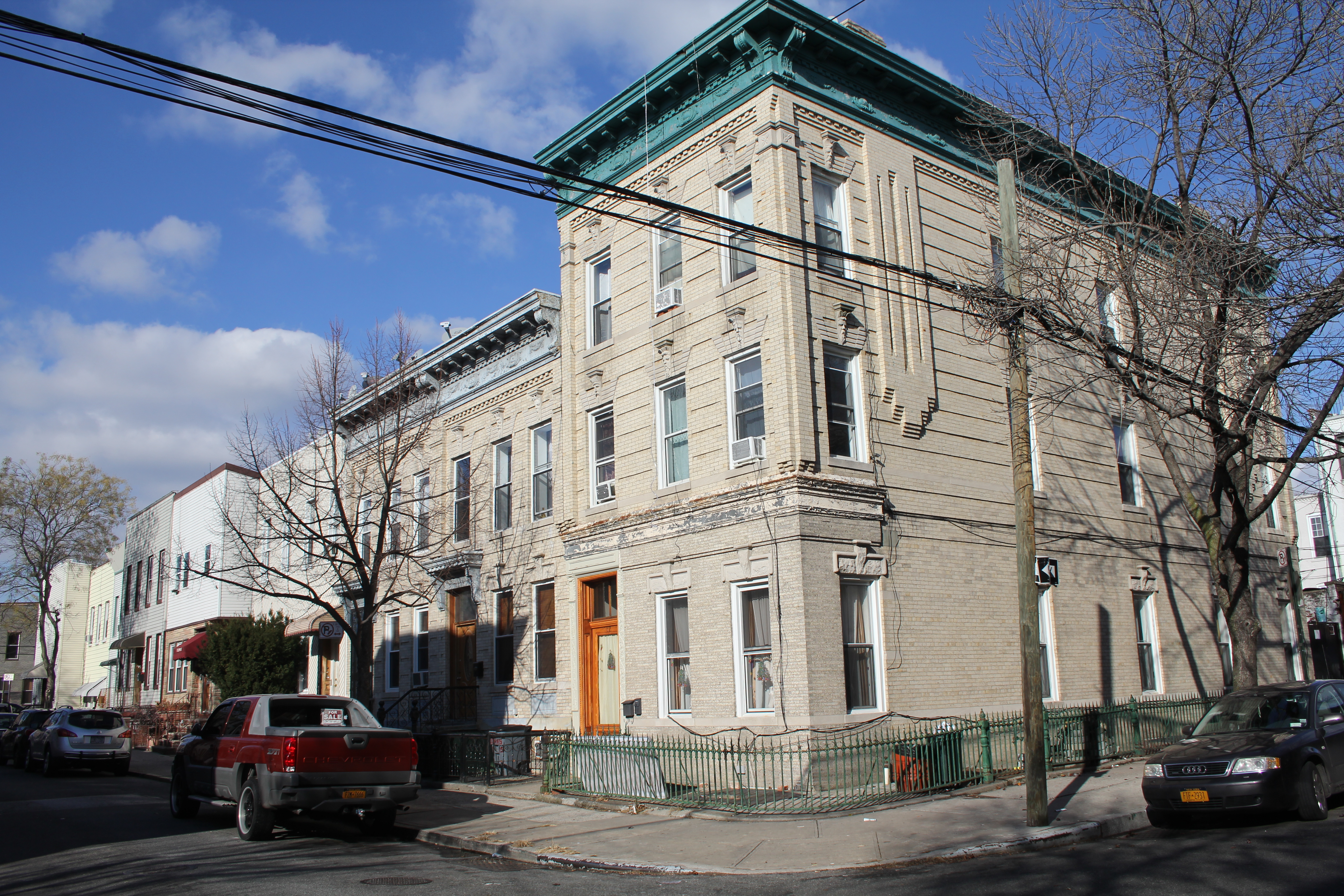
- Grove St. and St. John Rd., northwest corner

- Location within New York City Location within New York Location within the United States
- Location: Fairview Avenue; St. John's Road; Linden and Grove Streets, Queens, New York
- Coordinates: 40°42′23″N 73°54′26″W
- Area: 2 acres (0.81 ha)
- Built: 1908
- Architect: Berger, Louis, & Co.; Spaeth & Senger
- Architectural style: Romanesque, Romanesque Revival
- MPS: Ridgewood MRA
- NRHP reference No.: 83001772
- Added to NRHP: September 30, 1983

Grove–Linden–St. John's Historic District is a national historic district in Ridgewood, Queens, New York. It includes 51 contributing buildings built between 1908 and 1910. They consist of three story brick tenements with two apartments per floor. There are also a number of two- and three-story row houses with one apartment per floor. The buildings feature Romanesque Revival style detailing.

It was listed on the National Register of Historic Places in 1983.

== Gallery ==
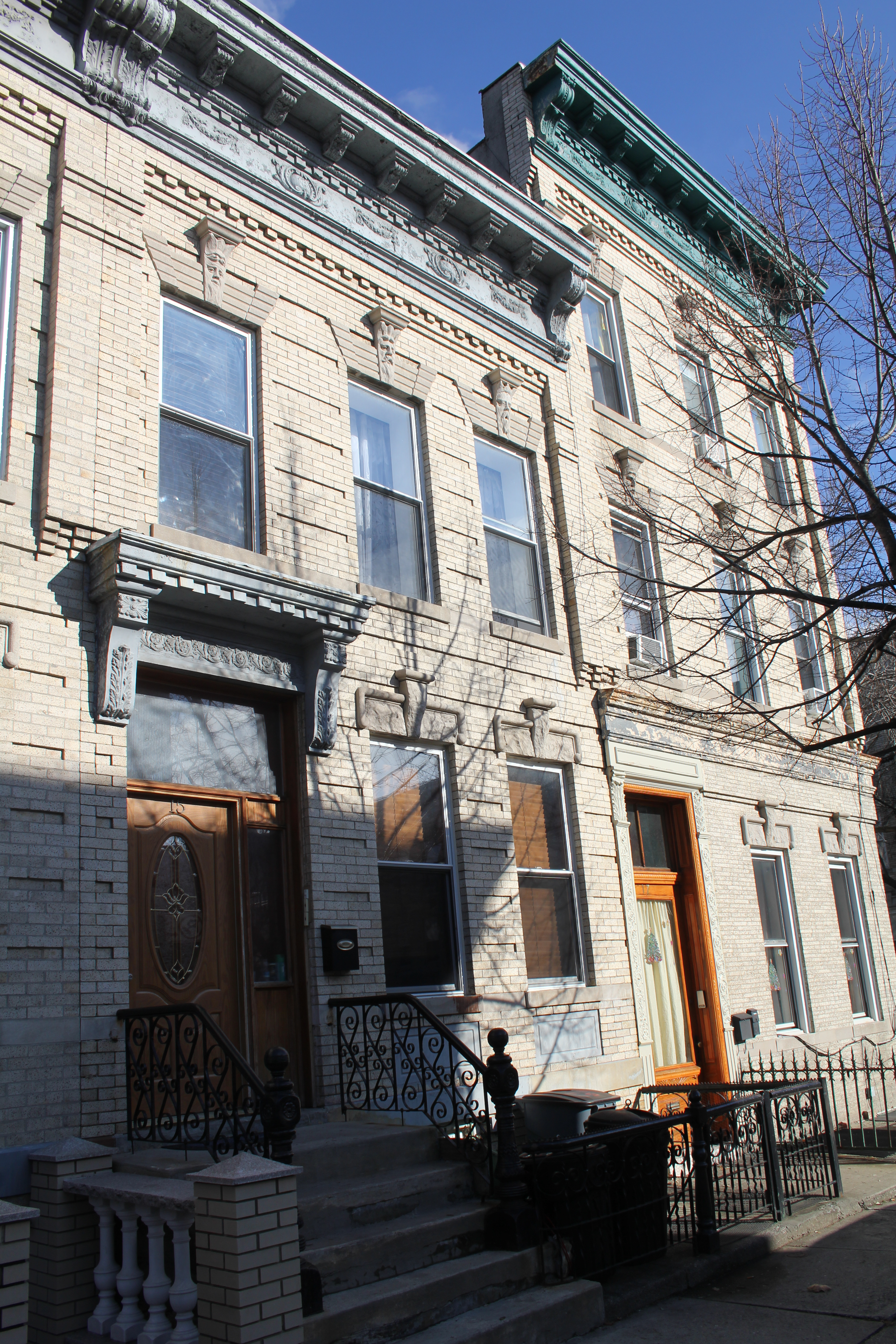
Small apartment houses on north side of St. John Rd.

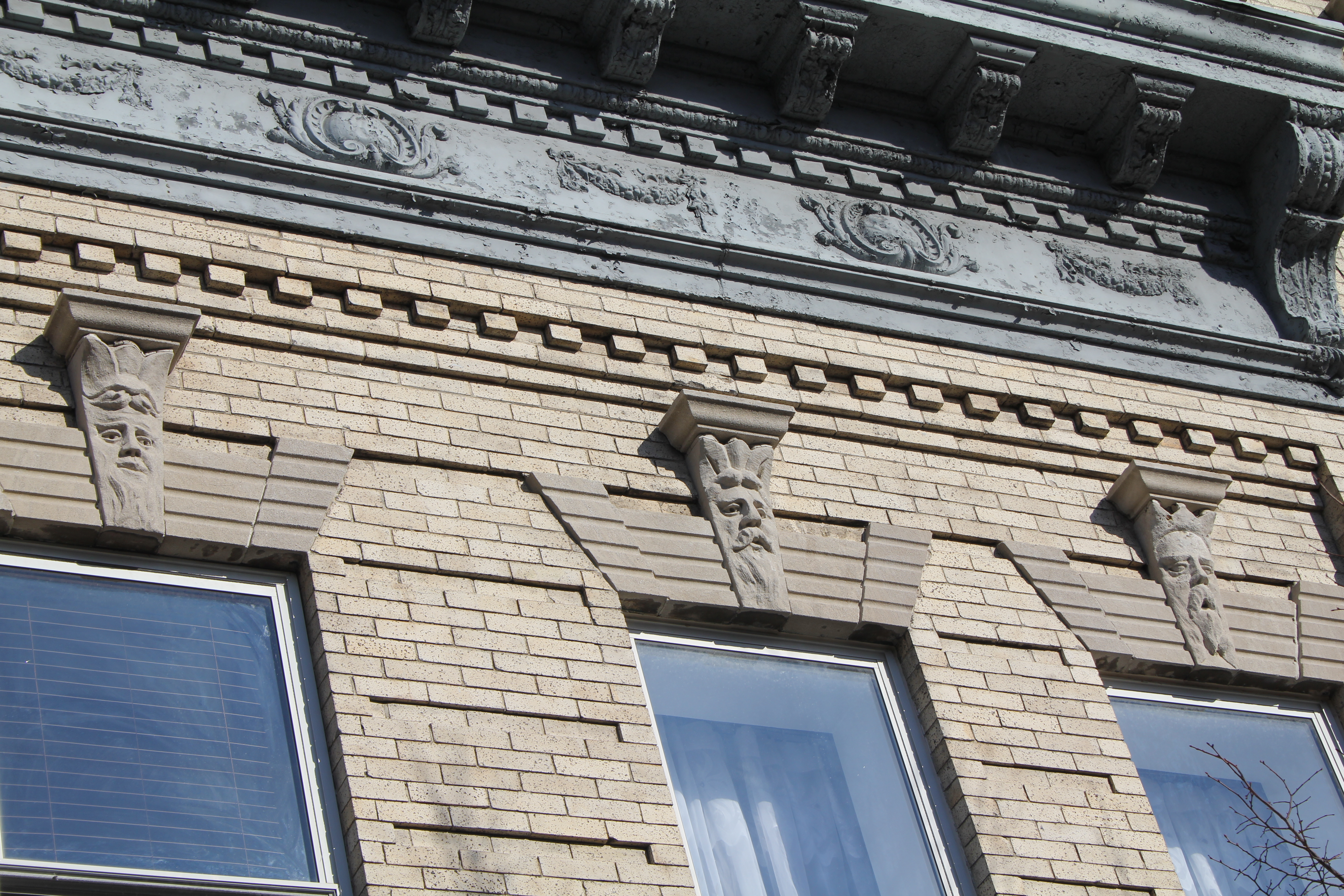
Architectural detail on one of the buildings. Note carved faces over windows.
