= Forest–Norman Historic District =

Historic district in Queens, New York

- U.S. National Register of Historic Places
- U.S. Historic district
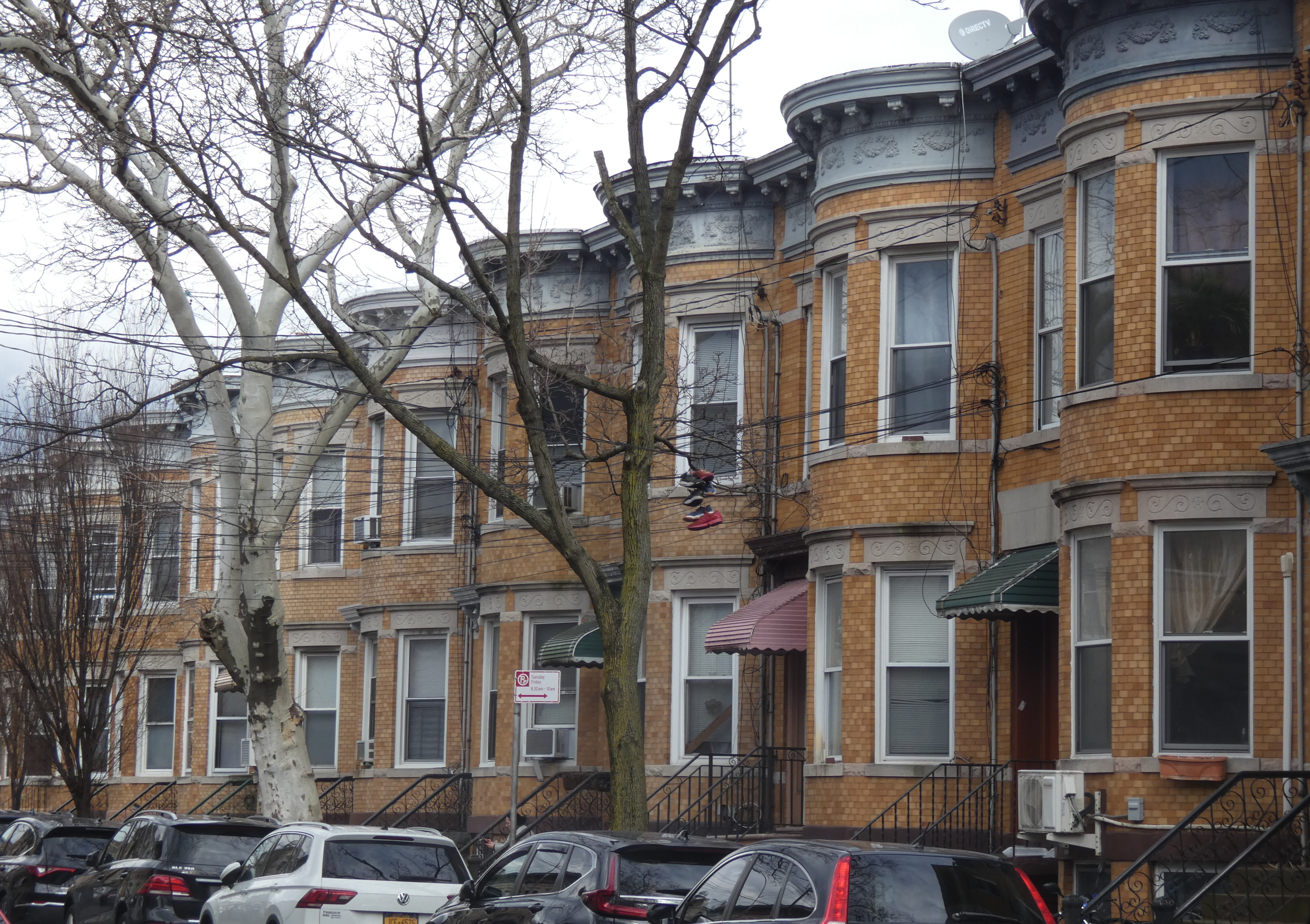
- Rowhouses in the historic district

- Location within New York City Location within New York Location within the United States
- Location: Forest Avenue from Summerfield Street to Stephen Street; and Norman Street to Myrtle Avenue, Queens, New York
- Coordinates: 40°41′59″N 73°53′58″W
- Area: 3 acres (1.2 ha)
- Built: 1908
- Architect: Berger, Louis
- MPS: Ridgewood MRA
- NRHP reference No.: 83001769
- Added to NRHP: September 30, 1983

Forest–Norman Historic District is a national historic district in Ridgewood, Queens, New York. It includes 37 contributing buildings built between 1908 and 1910. They consist of two-story brick houses with one apartment per floor and two-story brick tenements with two apartments per floor.

It was listed on the National Register of Historic Places in 1983.
