= Trinity College Chapel =

Trinity College Chapel may refer to:

- Trinity College Chapel, Cambridge of Trinity College, Cambridge
- Trinity College Chapel, Hartford, at Trinity College, Connecticut
- Trinity College Chapel, Dublin of Trinity College, Dublin
- Trinity College Chapel, Kandy, in Kandy, Ceylon
- Trinity College Chapel, Oxford of Trinity College, Oxford
- Trinity College Chapel, at University of Trinity College, Toronto
