= Clarence L. Irving =

American cultural activist

- Born: August 21, 1924; Prince George County, Virginia, U.S.
- Died: March 2014 (age 90) Jamaica, Queens, New York City
- Occupation: Cultural Archivist
- Formerly of: York College - Black American Heritage Foundation

Clarence L. Irving, Sr. (1924–2014) was an American cultural activist and mentor who made significant contributions to African-American history and heritage.

== Life ==
Irving was born on August 21, 1924, in Prince George County, Virginia, and moved to New York City after completing his early education. His great-great-great-great-great-grandfather served as an assistant to William Claiborne, a surveyor in Jamestown, Virginia. His progenitor was one of the original twenty Africans who were dropped off by the Dutch in the 1620s and was selected by William Claiborne to be his helper when he was a teenager.

Irving worked as a mechanist at the U.S. Naval Yard from 1944 to 1953, and during this time, he also organized and coached youth baseball teams. He founded the Bisons in 1953, which became a successful team in the Brooklyn Kiwanis League. The Bisons won the New York State Kiwanis Baseball Senior Division Championship in 1955, with Irving as the first African American manager and coach to play at Doubleday Field in Cooperstown, New York. Irving's talent for coaching elevated the level of competition for the team, which was named after Howard University's team. The Bisons played their home games on Brooklyn's Parade Ground adjacent to Prospect Park. In 1956 He left sandlot baseball and founded the Bison Athletic Club, which served as a mentorship program for young people in the Jamaica, Queens community. Through the club, Irving worked to promote physical fitness, discipline, and academic achievement among young people, while also providing them with positive role models and a supportive community.

== Cultural archivist ==
Irving's interest in stamps and advocacy for greater representation of African Americans through postage stamps led to his proposal for a stamp honoring a prominent black woman in 1975. This proposal, along with others, helped to raise awareness of the need for greater diversity in U.S. postage stamps. However, the first stamp in the Black Heritage Series, featuring Harriet Tubman, was not actually issued until 1978.

In 1975 Irving prepared a pamphlet called the "Black American Heritage Trail" in preparation for the United States Bicentennial in 1976 for York College. The pamphlet documents a historical journey through St. Albans and Jamaica, Queens, highlighting the locations of significant black American heritage sites, including the location of the first black settlement and the home of Count Basie.

On December 1, 1975, at a meeting of Queens community planning board No.2, Irving outlined his vision of the Bi-Centennial as he proposed several projects. Foremost among them was the idea for a "pathway and heritage trail" through Southeast Queens, chronicling the history of famous Black individuals in the area. York College aided in preparing a comprehensive brochure. The brochure, titled "Black American Heritage Trail of Landmarks in Southeast Queens, Jamaica, New York", was published in November 1976. It contained descriptions and photographs of ten historic sites. Emblazoned on its cover was the proclamation: "Project of the New York City Bicentennial Corporation."

In 1984, he founded the Black American Heritage Foundation (BAHF). He founded the Music History Archive in 1989, which serves as a repository for artifacts related to musicians.

== Honors ==
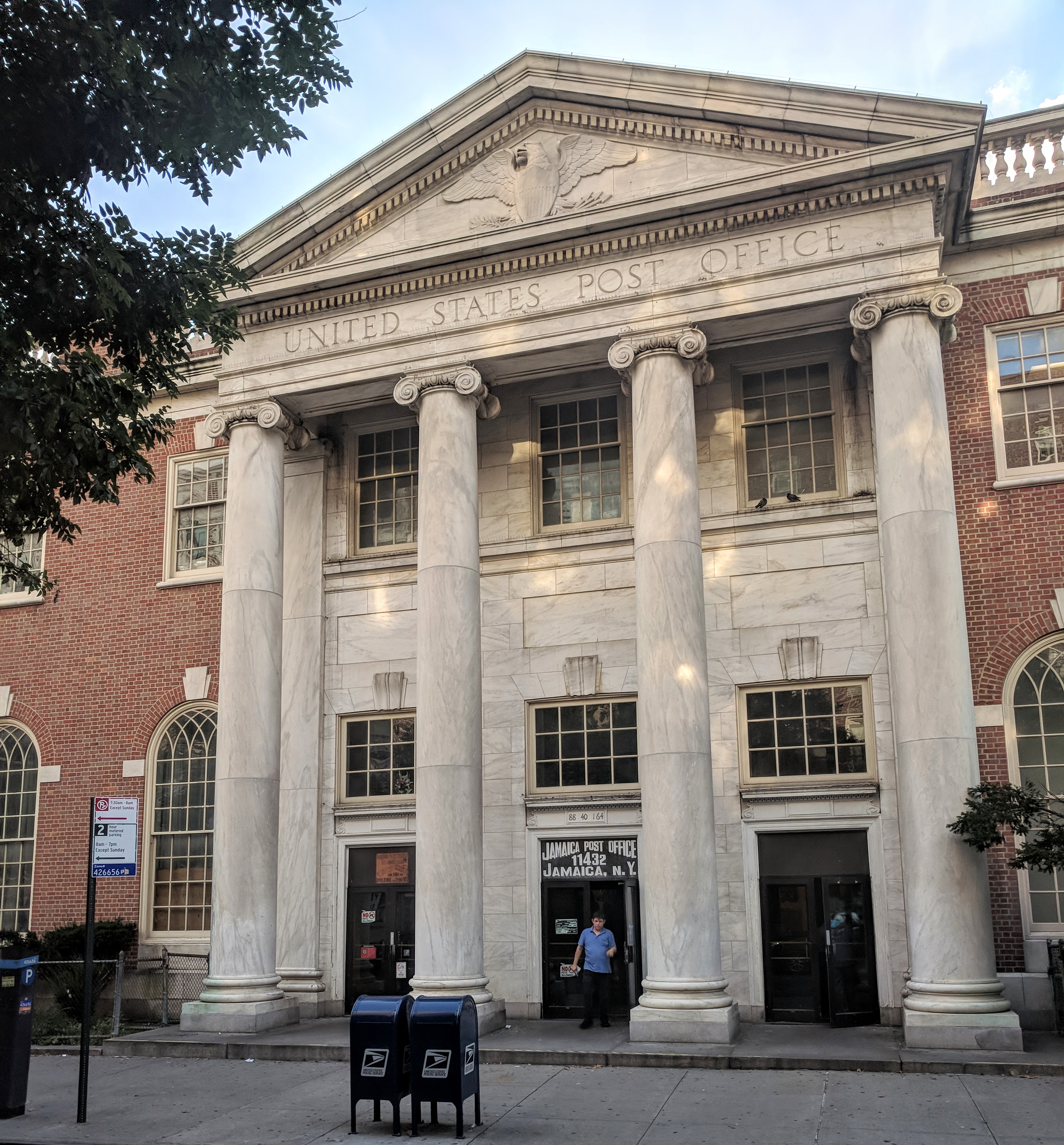
Clarence L. Irving, Sr. United States Post Office (Jamaica, Queens)

Irving received several awards, including the 1999 Carter G. Woodson Award and the 2000 Humanitarian Award from Omega Psi Phi fraternity. In 2007, the U.S. House of Representatives renamed the U.S. Postal Service Office in Jamaica, New York the "Clarence L. Irving, Sr. Post Office Building" in his honor.

== Death ==
He retired from Con Ed where he had worked for 32 years. Irving died in March 2014 at the age of 90.

== See also ==
- Archives of African American Music and Culture
