= Central Ridgewood Historic District =

Historic district in Queens, New York

- U.S. National Register of Historic Places
- U.S. Historic district
- New York State Register of Historic Places
- New York City Landmark
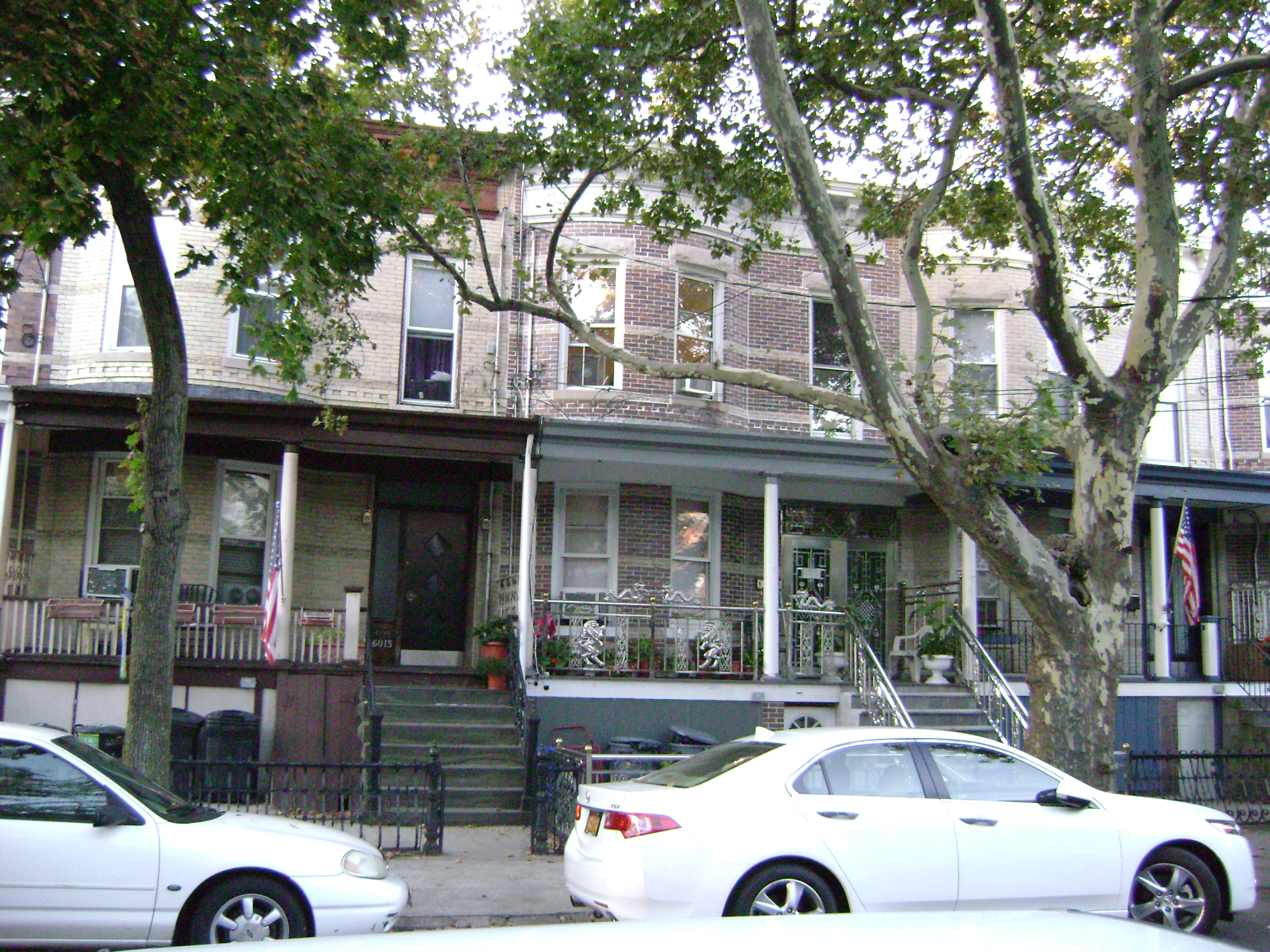
- These two-story brick row houses with rounded bays typify this district's contributing properties.

- Location within New York City Location within New York Location within the United States
- Location: Roughly bounded by Fresh Pond Rd., Putnam, 68th, Forest, Catalpa, Onderdonk, and 71st Aves., New York City
- Coordinates: 40°42′10″N 73°53′57″W
- Area: 56 acres (23 ha)
- Built: 1895
- Architect: Berger, Louis, & Co.
- Architectural style: Renaissance, Romanesque
- MPS: Ridgewood MRA
- NRHP reference No.: 83001762
- NYCL No.: 2448

Significant dates
- Added to NRHP: September 30, 1983
- Designated NYSRHP: August 17, 1983
- Designated NYCL: December 9, 2014

Central Ridgewood Historic District is a national historic district in Ridgewood, Queens, New York. It includes 990 contributing buildings built between 1895 and 1927. They consist mainly of two-story, brick rowhouse dwellings with one apartment per floor. Buildings feature rounded bay front facades and the use of several shades of speckled brick.

It was listed on the National Register of Historic Places in 1983. The area was given landmark status by the New York City Landmarks Preservation Commission in 2014.

== History of the Central Ridgewood Historic District ==
In the late 18th century and early 19th century, the land that now includes the Central Ridgewood Historic District was divided among several owners from prominent New York families, such as the Wycoffs, Duryeas, Woodards, and Debevoises. Although some have since been demolished, the district encompasses the homes of members of these prominent families, like the John C. Debevoise House, which was demolished and replaced by a senior center in 1974. The district also includes the site of the Queen's Labor Lyceum, a social club for the local workers, which closed in 1975.

The majority of homes in the Central Ridgewood Historic District were constructed between 1906 and the First World War. The homes are remarkably uniform in appearance, as they were primarily built by Louis Berger & Co. and constructed using bricks from the Kreischer Brick Manufacturing Company of Staten Island. The buildings in the historic district have load-bearing masonry walls constructed of red, buff, amber, and brown Kreischer brick. The buildings are finely detailed mainly in the Renaissance Revival style, mixed with elements from other architectural styles, like Romanesque Revival style.

== New York City Landmarks Preservation Status ==
On March 22, 2011, the New York City Landmarks Preservation Commission held a public hearing on the proposed designation of the Central Ridgewood Historic District. The district was designated a landmark on December 9, 2014. Those who spoke in favor of landmarking the district included Council member Diana Reyna, the Historic Districts Council, the Central Queens Historical Association, the Queens Preservation Council, and the New York Landmarks Conservancy.
