= New York's 38th State Assembly district =

American legislative district

Assemblymember
Jenifer Rajkumar; D–Woodhaven

New York's 38th State Assembly district is one of the 150 districts in the New York State Assembly. It has been represented by Jenifer Rajkumar since 2021, defeating Michael G. Miller in the 2020 Democratic primary; Rajkumar lost renomination to David Orkin in 2026, who will take office at the beginning of 2027.

== Geography ==
=== 2020s ===
District 38 is located in Queens, comprising the neighborhoods of Glendale, Ozone Park, Richmond Hill, Ridgewood, and Woodhaven. It also includes portions of South Ozone Park and South Richmond Hill.

The district overlaps New York's 5th and 7th congressional districts, as well as the 12th, 15th and 18th districts of the New York State Senate, and the 29th, 30th, 32nd and 34th districts of the New York City Council.

=== 2010s ===
District 38 is located in Queens, comprising the neighborhoods of Glendale, Ozone Park, Richmond Hill, Ridgewood, and Woodhaven.

== Recent election results ==
=== 2026 ===
2026 New York State Assembly election, District 38
Primary election
Party	Candidate	Votes	%
Democratic	David Orkin	3,861	59.1
Democratic	Jenifer Rajkumar (incumbent)	2,649	40.6
Write-in		18	0.3
Total votes		6,528	100
General election
Democratic	David Orkin		
Working Families	David Orkin		
Total	David Orkin		
Republican	Ruben Cruz II		
Queens United	Ruben Cruz II		
Total	Ruben Cruz II		
Write-in			
Total votes			100.0

=== 2024 ===
2024 New York State Assembly election, District 38
Party	Candidate	Votes	%
Democratic	Jenifer Rajkumar (incumbent)	22,718	97.8
Write-in		519	2.2
Total votes		23,237	100.0
Democratic hold			

=== 2022 ===
2022 New York State Assembly election, District 38
Party	Candidate	Votes	%
Democratic	Jenifer Rajkumar (incumbent)	11,662	97.8
Write-in		257	2.2
Total votes		11,919	100.0
Democratic hold			

=== 2020 ===
2020 New York State Assembly election, District 38
Primary election
Party	Candidate	Votes	%
Democratic	Jenifer Rajkumar	3,817	51.9
Democratic	Michael G. Miller (incumbent)	1,851	25.2
Democratic	Joey De Jesus	1,668	22.7
Write-in		12	0.2
Total votes		7,348	100.0
General election
Democratic	Jenifer Rajkumar	25,232	72.6
Republican	Giovanni Perna	8,172	
Conservative	Giovanni Perna	832	
Save Our City	Giovanni Perna	439	
Total	Giovanni Perna	9,443	27.2
Write-in		77	0.2
Total votes		34,752	100.0
Democratic hold			

=== 2018 ===
2018 New York State Assembly election, District 38
Party	Candidate	Votes	%
Democratic	Michael G. Miller	16,913	
Conservative	Michael G. Miller	1,928	
Total	Michael G. Miller (incumbent)	18,841	99.6
Write-in		78	0.4
Total votes		18,919	100.0
Democratic hold			

=== 2016 ===
2016 New York State Assembly election, District 38
Party	Candidate	Votes	%
Democratic	Michael G. Miller	22,966	
Conservative	Michael G. Miller	992	
Total	Michael G. Miller (incumbent)	23,958	80.4
Republican	Joseph Maldonado	5,299	
Reform	Joseph Maldonado	496	
Total	Joseph Maldonado	5,795	19.4
Write-in		39	0.2
Total votes		29,792	100.0
Democratic hold			

=== 2014 ===
2014 New York State Assembly election, District 38
Party	Candidate	Votes	%
Democratic	Michael G. Miller (incumbent)	6,694	99.3
Write-in		50	0.7
Total votes		6,744	100.0
Democratic hold			

=== 2012 ===
2012 New York State Assembly election, District 38
Primary election
Party	Candidate	Votes	%
Democratic	Michael G. Miller (incumbent)	1,522	70.9
Democratic	Etienne David Adorno	617	28.7
Write-in		8	0.4
Total votes		2,147	100.0
General election
Democratic	Michael G. Miller	18,547	
Working Families	Michael G. Miller	1,267	
Total	Michael G. Miller (incumbent)	19,814	99.8
Write-in		30	0.2
Total votes		19,844	100.0
Democratic hold			

=== 2010 ===
2010 New York State Assembly election, District 38
Primary election
Party	Candidate	Votes	%
Democratic	Michael G. Miller (incumbent)	1,867	76.5
Democratic	Nick Comaianni	571	23.4
Write-in		1	0.1
Total votes		2,439	100.0
Conservative	Donna Marie Caltabiano	61	59.2
Conservative	Michael G. Miller (incumbent)	38	36.9
Write-in		4	3.9
Total votes		103	100.0
General election
Democratic	Michael G. Miller	8,412	
Working Families	Michael G. Miller	433	
Independence	Michael G. Miller	359	
Total	Michael G. Miller (incumbent)	9,204	69.6
Republican	Donna Marie Caltabiano	3,405	
Conservative	Donna Marie Caltabiano	605	
Total	Donna Marie Caltabiano	4,010	30.3
Write-in		13	0.1
Total votes		13,227	100.0
Democratic hold			

=== 2009 special ===
Incumbent Anthony Seminerio resigned his seat on June 23, 2009, following an indictment for alleged Honest services fraud, triggering a special election. In special elections for state legislative offices, primaries are usually not held – county committee members and district leaders for each party select nominees. Election was held on September 15th, 2011.

2009 New York State Assembly special election, District 38
Party	Candidate	Votes	%
Democratic	Michael G. Miller	2,423	
Conservative	Michael G. Miller	220	
Independence	Michael G. Miller	149	
Total	Michael G. Miller	2,792	65.7
Republican	Donna Marie Caltabiano	1,458	34.3
Write-in		1	0.0
Total votes		4,251	100.0
Democratic hold			

=== 2008 ===
2008 New York State Assembly election, District 38
Party	Candidate	Votes	%
Democratic	Anthony Seminerio	14,262	
Republican	Anthony Seminerio	4,674	
Conservative	Anthony Seminerio	568	
Independence	Anthony Seminerio	353	
Total	Anthony Seminerio (incumbent)	19,857	100.0
Write-in		3	0.0
Total votes		19,860	100.0
Democratic gain from			

=== 2006 ===
2006 New York State Assembly election, District 38
Party	Candidate	Votes	%
Democratic	Anthony Seminerio	7,089	
Republican	Anthony Seminerio	2,866	
Conservative	Anthony Seminerio	607	
Independence	Anthony Seminerio	287	
Total	Anthony Seminerio (incumbent)	10,849	100.0
Write-in		3	0.0
Total votes		10,852	100.0
Democratic hold			

=== 2004 ===
2004 New York State Assembly election, District 38
Party	Candidate	Votes	%
Democratic	Anthony Seminerio	12,776	
Republican	Anthony Seminerio	6,464	
Conservative	Anthony Seminerio	761	
Independence	Anthony Seminerio	350	
Total	Anthony Seminerio (incumbent)	20,351	100.0
Write-in		0	0.0
Total votes		20,351	100.0
Democratic hold			

=== 2002 ===
2002 New York State Assembly election, District 38
Party	Candidate	Votes	%
Democratic	Anthony Seminerio	6,547	
Conservative	Anthony Seminerio	1,071	
Total	Anthony Seminerio (incumbent)	7,618	95.5
Green	Darius Pereira	356	4.5
Write-in		5	0.1
Total votes		7,979	100.0
Democratic hold			

=== 2000 ===
2000 New York State Assembly election, District 38
Party	Candidate	Votes	%
Democratic	Anthony Seminerio	16,612	
Conservative	Anthony Seminerio	1,535	
Independence	Anthony Seminerio	590	
Total	Anthony Seminerio (incumbent)	18,737	76.0
Republican	William Johnert	5,917	24.0
Write-in		2	0.0
Total votes		24,656	100.0
Democratic hold			

=== Federal results in Assembly District 38 ===
Year	Office	Results
2024	President	Harris 55.5 - 42.0%
2024	Senate	Gillibrand 61.4 - 37.4%
2022	Senate	Schumer 63.1 - 36.0%
2020	President	Biden 71.2 - 27.7%
2018	Senate	Gillibrand 82.4 - 17.6%
2016	President	Clinton 75.9 - 20.9%
2016	Senate	Schumer 82.6 - 14.7%
2012	President	Obama 80.7 - 18.4%
2012	Senate	Gillibrand 84.9 - 13.9%
