= Desis Rising Up and Moving =

Advocacy organization in New York City

- Abbreviation: DRUM
- Formation: 1999-2000
- Founder: Monami Maulik
- Legal status: Nonprofit organization
- Headquarters: Jackson Heights, New York City, NY, USA
- Region served: New York City
- Executive Director: Fahd Ahmed
- Website: www.drumnyc.org

Desis Rising Up and Moving (DRUM) is a New York City advocacy organization that coordinates working-class people of South Asian and Indo-Caribbean descent. DRUM estimates that over 5,000 "adults, youth, and families" are members.

Monami Maulik cofounded DRUM to improve "solidarity between Asian immigrants and other communities of color."

DRUM's sibling organization DRUM Beats, which does electoral politics work, was among the first organizations to endorse Zohran Mamdani's campaign in the 2025 New York City mayoral election. DRUM Beats performed door-to-door canvassing in several languages to increase voter turnout. Multiple news outlets credited DRUM Beats's endorsement and canvassing work as a key factor in Mamdani's victory; one criticized it for possible foreign influence.

== Founding and early years ==
In 1999, Maulik, then 25 years old, was seeking meetings for organizers. She cofounded Desis Rising Up and Moving as part of "a small group of men and women" in 1999-2000. It aimed to help poorer South Asian immigrants, and participated in a germinal coalition-building meeting of area South Asian groups in mid-2001. As of July 2001, DRUM called itself "an organization for and by working class desi communities working for social justice" (emphasis in original) and listed its projects as "YouthPower" and "De-detention for people in INS jails and their families."

Shortly thereafter, in the wake of the September 11 attacks, DRUM's membership, which was mostly Muslim, faced Islamophobic discrimination. DRUM co-sponsored a "legal aid and know-your-rights forum" held in Jackson Heights, aiming to help people being assaulted in hate crimes or questioned or detained because of their immigration status. DRUM protested detentions, especially the INS's and FBI's secret detentions made without publicly charging detainees, alongside groups such as the Prison Moratorium Project. In 2002, the INS agreed to meet a demand by DRUM and its allies for a public meeting.

DRUM advocated the end of NSEERS.

DRUM formed part of the Coalition Against Police Brutality, which worked to fight stop-and-frisk in New York City. The coalition organized surrounding a court case that resolved in 2003 with the directive to disband the NYPD's controversial Street Crimes Unit.

In 2006, DRUM was fiscally sponsored by the AJ Muste Memorial Institute. DRUM gained tax-exempt status in 2007, as a 501(c)(3) organization.

== Later activities ==
DRUM convened more than a hundred New Yorkers to discuss policing and race in the wake of police killings of Mike Brown and Eric Garner. In the 2020s, DRUM supported the families of Win Rozario and Jabez Chakraborty, who were both shot by NYPD officers after emergency calls for mental health support.

NYC Public Advocate speaks at a DRUM rally in 2026

In the mid-2010s, DRUM aimed to be a multigenerational organization. DRUM YouthPower! members collaborated with adult members to advocate for changes to New York City public school disciplinary practices public school security measures, and to participate in drafting proposed legislation and briefings for Councilmembers. Youth members also developed a walking tour of Jackson Heights that highlights local activist history.

After Donald Trump was elected President in 2016, as DRUM anticipated new anti-immigration policies, DRUM declared Jackson Heights a "Hate Free Zone" at a rally advertised by longtime volunteer DJ Rekha.

DRUM opposed the proposed Amazon headquarters in New York City.

In 2018, DRUM organized men's meetings where South Asian men could discuss domestic violence, masculinity, and related topics, as a spinoff of a similar gender justice program for South Asian women started two years earlier.

Undocumented immigrants comprise part of DRUM's base. In 2020, DRUM coordinated and delivered meals for undocumented immigrants in Queens during the COVID-19 pandemic. As of 2022, DRUM was seen as "somewhat of an incubator for immigrant organizers in New York City".

DRUM worked with the New York Taxi Workers' Alliance to co-organize a set of protests against medallion debt in 2021. Then-Assemblymember Zohran Mamdani participated in the protests, including a hunger strike. The city government eventually acceded to the taxi workers' demands.

Republican gubernatorial candidate Bruce Blakeman in 2025 criticized past statements by DRUM staffer Kazi Fouzia, as Fouzia served on Mamdani's mayoral transition committee. Fouzia had in 2020 criticized people who join the NYPD.

== DRUM Beats ==
DRUM Beats started in 2021 as a sibling organization to DRUM that would do electoral work, such as endorsements and boosting voter turnout. More than 75% of DRUM Beats's membership and leadership is women and girls.

In 2024, as Zohran Mamdani launched a mayoral campaign that was widely considered unlikely to win, DRUM Beats was one of his earliest endorsers, leading a multilingual interview process representing a coalition of several advocacy groups across the city. In 2025, DRUM Beats, with "organizing bases in the Bronx, Brooklyn, and Queens spanning a range of South Asian and Indo-Caribbean diasporic communities", supported Mamdani's campaign, deploying "volunteers speaking Urdu, Bengali, Punjabi, Nepali, Tibetan and Guyanese Creole" to register and turn out voters. They estimated they reached over 15,000 New Yorkers via door-knocking and phone calls. Neighborhoods with significant South Asian-American populations, such as Kensington and Parkchester, voted heavily for Mamdani. In his victory speech on election night, Mamdani thanked those volunteers, saying, "This is the victory of the Bangladeshi auntie who knocked on door after door until her feet throbbed and her knuckles ached." The New York Post asked whether DRUM Beats's influence constituted "foreign interference" in the election.

In 2026, DRUM Beats endorsed David Orkin, who successfully defeated sitting Assemblymember Jenifer Rajkumar in the June 2026 Democratic primary election. The New York Times noted DRUM Beats's role in persuading the significant South Asian electorate within the district to support Orkin (who is white and Jewish) rather than the South Asian incumbent. DRUM Beats advised on advertisements that attacked Rajkumar for her support of Indian leader Narendra Modi; Rajkumar's campaign and the Hindu American Foundation criticized the ads as bigoted.

== Organizational approach ==
DRUM commits to and encourages "transformative solidarity" to work toward collective liberation with other marginalized groups. Transformative solidarity (a term DRUM is credited with coining and defining) goes beyond statements of support and reciprocating another group's support in policy advocacy, going so far as to make material sacrifices in order to avoid harm to others: "masses of oppressed communities choose to forgo something that would benefit them, and do not take it because it comes at the expense of other oppressed communities." For example, DRUM's membership chose not to advocate for certain immigration reform approaches that would "bring[] more harm to all of our people for generations to come while doing good for only a fragment of the 14 million... [and] would create a permanent immigrant underclass in the United States."

DRUM has been characterized as an example of "Indian diasporic organizations and practices that emphasize political mobilization through cross-national and racial solidarities", and an example of how post-Sa-I-Gu diasporic and geographically local political organizing by Asian-Americans is more attentive to "larger histories and dynamics of racial subordination and power" in the surrounding world.

Revenue for DRUM and DRUM Beats comes from its membership and has come from grants from funders such as North Star, the Catholic Campaign for Human Development in the Diocese of Brooklyn, New York Foundation, Open Society Foundations, and Ben & Jerry's Foundation.
