= Jenifer Rajkumar =

American politician

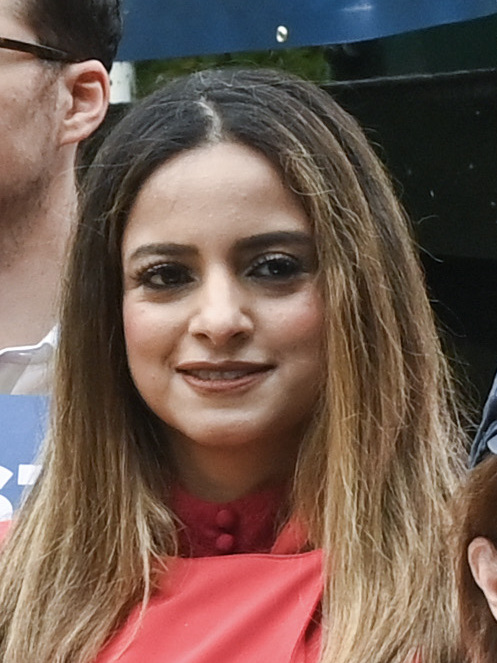
- Rajkumar in 2025

Member of the New York State Assembly from the 38th district
- Incumbent
- Assumed office January 1, 2021
- Preceded by: Michael G. Miller

Personal details
- Born: September 1, 1982 (age 44) Tarrytown, New York, U.S.
- Party: Democratic
- Education: University of Pennsylvania (BA); Stanford University (JD)
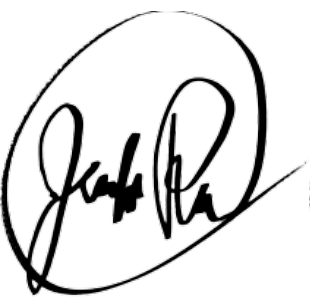
- Signature
- Website: Campaign website State Assembly website

Jenifer Rajkumar (born September 1, 1982) is an American politician and civil rights lawyer serving as a member of the New York State Assembly from the 38th district. A Democrat, she represents the Queens neighborhoods of Glendale, Ozone Park, Richmond Hill, Ridgewood, and Woodhaven.

She is the first Indian-American woman ever elected to a New York State office. Rajkumar is known as the “Lady in Red” for her frequent public appearances in red attire. In January 2025, Rajkumar announced her campaign for New York City Public Advocate calling for a "complete overhaul of city government" and "a new brand of public service". Rajkumar was known as one of Mayor Eric Adams' closest allies in the New York State Legislature, but she declined to endorse him for re-election. Rajkumar lost renomination by 18% points to NYC-DSA-endorsed attorney David Orkin in the 2026 election.

== Early life and education ==
Rajkumar was born and raised in Tarrytown in Westchester County. Her parents are doctors who immigrated from India and first settled in Queens. She is a graduate of Hackley School. Rajkumar earned a Bachelor of Arts degree from the University of Pennsylvania and a Juris Doctor from Stanford Law School. She is of Punjabi descent.

== Career ==
Rajkumar previously practiced law as an attorney and worked as an adjunct professor of political science at CUNY's Lehman College in the Bronx. In 2014, Rajkumar was accused of engaging in "gross plagiarism" by Newman Ferrara LLP in a tenant's rights case, but the motion for disqualification was withdrawn after an agreement between the firm and Sanford Heisler, where Rajkumar served as of counsel.

On February 6, 2017, Governor Andrew Cuomo appointed Rajkumar as the Director of Immigration Affairs and Special Counsel for the New York Department of State.

In 2020, Rajkumar became the first Indian-American woman ever elected to the New York State Legislature as a member of the New York State Assembly from the 38th district, representing the Queens neighborhoods of Glendale, Ozone Park, Richmond Hill, Ridgewood, and Woodhaven.

In December 2021, mayor-elect Eric Adams appointed Rajkumar as a senior advisor on his transition team.

=== New York State Assembly tenure ===
Rajkumar led and won passage of her bill establishing Diwali as a school holiday in New York City Public Schools. Rajkumar also authored and passed the SMOKEOUT Act, shutting down illegal smokeshops proliferating around New York.

In her first term, Rajkumar passed a legislative package for domestic workers, securing them the full protections of the state human rights law, and expanding their paid family leave benefits. Governor Kathy Hochul signed Rajkumar's legislative package into law in December 2021. Rajkumar also passed a bill expanding benefits for victims of crime, which the Governor signed into law in June 2022.

Rajkumar was appointed by the Speaker of the Assembly as the Chair of the Subcommittee on Diversity in Law. She also serves on the following Assembly Committees: Judiciary, Veterans' Affairs, Committee on Aging, Consumer Affairs, and Small Business.

== Political campaigns ==
=== 2011 District Leader race ===
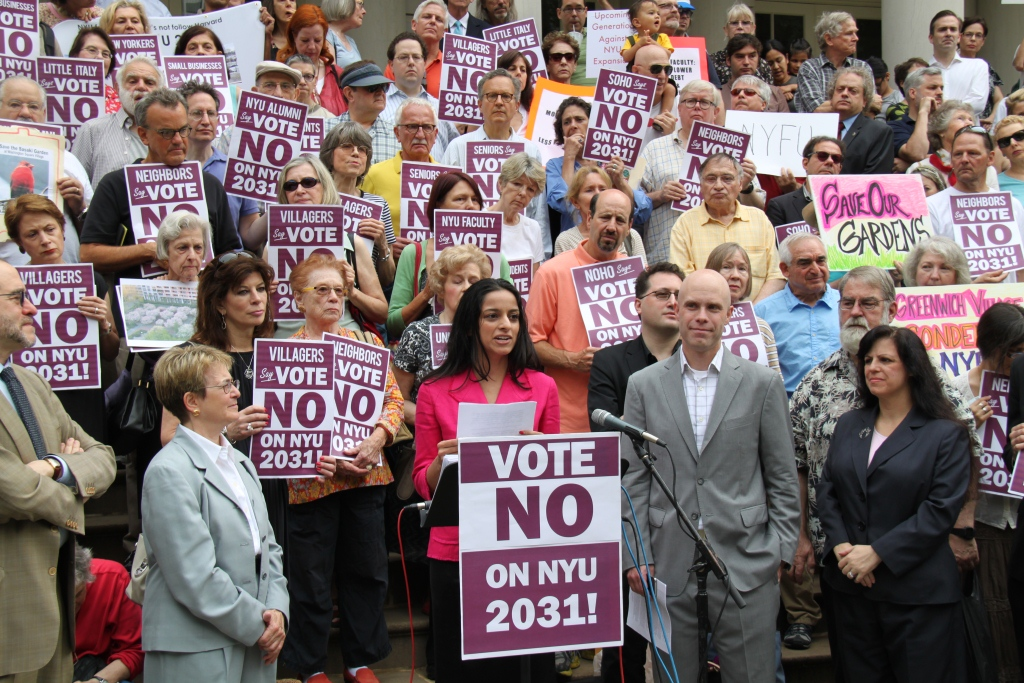
Rajkumar speaking at a rally as a district leader in 2012

In 2011, Rajkumar was elected female district leader for the 64th district Part C of the New York State Assembly, defeating 28-year incumbent Linda Belfer with over 70% of the vote. She was re-elected to that office two more times, in 2013 and 2015. As district leader, Rajkumar led the effort to bring M9 bus service back to Battery Park City in Lower Manhattan and has worked closely with Democracy for Battery Park City, an organization which seeks representation for residents of the neighborhood on the board of the Battery Park City Authority.

=== 2013 City Council race ===
In 2013, Rajkumar ran for the New York City Council in the Democratic primary in the 1st district in Lower Manhattan, losing to incumbent Margaret Chin. Rajkumar won 41.5% of the vote. Rajkumar's campaign championed affordable housing and community-friendly development. She was endorsed by various organizations and unions, such as The Sierra Club, and local Allied Craftworkers and Ironworkers groups.

=== 2016 State Assembly race ===
She ran for the New York State Assembly in the 65th District, as the seat was occupied by Alice Cancel, the winner of a special election on April 19, 2016, to replace Sheldon Silver, who was convicted of corruption and expelled from the Assembly in 2015. Rajkumar finished second in a six-way Democratic primary; the winner, Yuh-Line Niou, went on to win in the general election in November.

=== 2020 State Assembly race ===
Rajkumar ran in the primary for the 38th New York State Assembly district in Queens, which includes portions of the Glendale, Ozone Park, Richmond Hill, Ridgewood, and Woodhaven neighborhoods, against incumbent Democrat Michael G. Miller and challenger Joey De Jesus. Rajkumar was endorsed by California Congressman Ro Khanna in February 2020. In May 2020, City & State criticized Rajkumar alongside a slate of other candidates for carpetbagging across multiple primaries and elections.

Rajkumar defeated Miller and De Jesus in the June 2020 Democratic primary and won over Giovanni Perna in the November general election.

=== 2025 New York City Public Advocate campaign ===
On August 12, 2024, Rajkumar announced her campaign for New York City Comptroller in 2025. On January 27, 2025, she pivoted her campaign to Public Advocate, challenging incumbent Jumaane Williams in the Democratic primary.

On April 24, Rajkumar posted a cartoon of herself contrasted with Williams, who was drawn asleep under a screenshot of a 2021 tweet posted by Williams replying to councilmember Joe Borelli about edibles; the meme was slammed as "racist" by political consultants and elected officials including Donovan Richards and Lincoln Restler, who said it perpetuated negative stereotypes of African Americans as drug addicts.

Writing for City and State in May, Sophie Krichevsky called the race "weird", describing Rajkumar as a long shot based on public polling showing a landslide victory for Williams and describing the race as "an out of the spotlight, lopsided and weirdly acrimonious race with plenty of mudslinging and millions in campaign cash".

Rajkumar and Williams participated in a debate on June 6 hosted by PIX11, where Rajkumar accused Williams of covering up an active investigation into a former staffer's accusation that she was drugged and assaulted by security detail in the Public Advocate's office and said he should "think about resigning".

In the June 24 Democratic primary election, Rajkumar was handily defeated by Williams; placing second with 18.7% of the vote according to unofficial election night results.

=== 2026 State Assembly campaign ===
In the 2026 election, Rajkumar faced a challenge from NYC-DSA-endorsed attorney David Orkin who was also backed by Alexandria Ocasio-Cortez and Claire Valdez among others. At the candidate filing deadline, numerous registered voters alleged that Rajkumar's campaign had falsified their signatures in her nomination petitions including an Orkin campaign volunteer and a Queens Chronicle editor. Orkin sued to have her disqualified from the ballot, alleging petition fraud, but the lawsuit was thrown out on procedural grounds by the Queens Supreme Court for not properly subpoenaing Rajkumar’s campaign workers associated with the fraud in April and an appeal was dismissed.

Her re-election campaign was endorsed by Gregory Meeks, John Liu, Carl Heastie, Sam Berger, Nily Rozic, Lynn Schulman, 32BJ SEIU, and the Hotel and Gaming Trades Council. A digital advertisement by the Working Families Party's associated super PAC attacked Rajkumar as "Modi's best friend in Queens" for her alleged ties to Hindutva activists and organizations.

Rajkumar was defeated by Orkin in the June 23, 2026, Democratic primary election by 18% points.

== Electoral history ==
Date	Election	Candidate	Party	Votes	%
New York City Council, District 1
September 10, 2013	Primary	Margaret Chin (inc.)	Democratic	8,846	58.88%
September 10, 2013	Primary	Jenifer Rajkumar	Democratic	6,171	41.07%
September 10, 2013	Primary	Write-ins		7	0.05%
New York State Assembly, District 65
September 13, 2016	Primary	Yuh-Line Niou	Democratic	2,790	31.42%
September 13, 2016	Primary	Jenifer Rajkumar	Democratic	1,701	19.16%
September 13, 2016	Primary	Paul Newell	Democratic	1,425	16.05%
September 13, 2016	Primary	Alice Cancel (inc.)	Democratic	1,108	12.48%
September 13, 2016	Primary	Don Lee	Democratic	995	11.20%
September 13, 2016	Primary	Gigi Li	Democratic	844	9.50%
September 13, 2016	Primary	Write-ins		17	0.19%
New York State Assembly, District 38
June 23, 2020	Primary	Jenifer Rajkumar	Democratic	3,817	51.95%
June 23, 2020	Primary	Michael G. Miller (inc.)	Democratic	1,851	25.19%
June 23, 2020	Primary	Joseph de Jesus	Democratic	1,668	22.70%
June 23, 2020	Primary	Write-ins		12	0.16%
November 3, 2020	General	Jenifer Rajkumar	Democratic	25,232	72.61%
November 3, 2020	General	Giovanni Perna	R/C/Save Our City	9,443	27.17%
November 3, 2020	General	Write-ins		77	0.22%
November 8, 2022	General	Jenifer Rajkumar (inc.)	Democratic	11,662	97.82%
November 8, 2022	General	Write-ins		260	2.18%
November 3, 2024	General	Jenifer Rajkumar (inc.)	Democratic	22,718	97.77%
November 3, 2024	General	Write-ins		519	2.23%
New York City Public Advocate
June 24, 2025	Primary	Jumaane Williams (inc.)	Democratic	681,605	71.2%
June 24, 2025	Primary	Jenifer Rajkumar	Democratic	179,439	18.8%
June 24, 2025	Primary	Marty Dolan	Democratic	89,841	9.4%
June 24, 2025	Primary	Write-ins		5,983	0.6%
New York State Assembly, District 38
June 23, 2026	Primary	David Orkin	Democratic	3,722	58.02%
June 23, 2026	Primary	Jenifer Rajkumar (inc.)	Democratic	2,588	40.34%
June 23, 2026	Primary	Write-ins / Blank / Void		105	1.64%

== Personal life ==
Rajkumar is a practicing Hindu.

== See also ==
- Indian Americans in New York City
- Indian American politicians
