= Mafera Park =

Public park in Queens, New York

Coordinates: 40.706827°N 73.891306°W

- Interactive map of Mafera Park
- Type: Public
- Location: Glendale, Queens, New York City
- Area: 5.4 acres (22,000 m^{2})
- Owned by: City of New York
- Operated by: New York City Department of Parks and Recreation

Mafera Park (officially Joseph F. Mafera Park) is a park in Queens, New York City, United States. It is approximately 5.4 acres (0.022 km^{2}) in size, located adjacent to the New York City Subway's Fresh Pond Yard and close to the Fresh Pond Junction between the Long Island Rail Road's Bay Ridge and Lower Montauk branches. It has facilities for baseball, basketball, roller hockey, and handball.

== Overview ==
The park is named after Ridgewood resident Joseph F. Mafera; when Mafera died in 1967, the park was renamed by law in his honor. The City of New York purchased the land in 1948, and on June 28, 1949, a groundbreaking ceremony was held, featuring New York City mayor William O'Dwyer, Queens Borough President James A. Burke, and Commissioner of Parks and Recreation Robert Moses.

Mafera Park was also known as Farmers' Oval due to the park's history hosting the semi-professional Glendale Farmers Base Ball Club for almost 50 years, from the 1900s until the 1950s. In the late 1940s and early 1950s it was also briefly called Ridgewood Park and Glen Ridge Park, as the park is between Glendale and Ridgewood.

It was renovated in the early 1990s, and a ribbon cutting ceremony was hosted by mayor Rudy Giuliani, Queens Borough President Claire Shulman, and New York City parks commissioner Henry Stern on March 18, 1995.
