= James A. Lundy =

American politician (died 1973)

11th Borough President of Queens
- In office January 1, 1952 – December 31, 1957
- Preceded by: Joseph F. Mafera
- Succeeded by: James J. Crisona

Personal details
- Born: c. 1906
- Died: May 22, 1973
- Party: Republican

James A. Lundy (died May 22, 1973) was a Republican politician from Queens, New York City known for serving as Queens Borough President and chairman of the State Public Service Commission. He is to date the last Republican to serve as Queens Borough President.

== Career ==
Before running for office, Lundy founded and ran a naptha processing company. His first public office was Borough President of Queens, when he won the 1951 special election following the death of Maurice A. FitzGerald and the interim office holder Joseph F. Mafera. He won the following general election, but lost to Democrat James J. Crisona in 1957.

In January 1958, Lundy was endorsed by the Queens Republican Committee for the gubernatorial nomination. In August of that year, he was again endorsed by the county committee, this time to secure either the Lieutenant Governor or State Controller nomination. He was eventually nominated for New York State Comptroller in the New York state election, 1958, but lost by fewer than 15,000 votes to Democrat Arthur Levitt.

Afterwards, Lundy spent much of his public career in energy and utility regulation. He was a member of the New York State Atomic Energy Commission and a president of the National Association of Regulatory Utility Commissioners. In 1960 he was appointed by Governor Nelson Rockefeller to the powerful State Public Service Commission. While there, he oversaw railroad regulations and the electricity rates of Consolidated Edison. He remained on the Commission until 1970, when he stepped down for health reasons.

== Death ==
Lundy lived in Douglaston before relocating to Denver, Colorado, for medical treatment. He died there eight months later in 1973 at the age of 67.

Party political offices
Preceded by Frank Del Vecchio	Republican nominee for New York State Comptroller; 1958	Succeeded by John P. Lomenzo
Political offices
Preceded by Joseph F. Mafera	Borough President of Queens; 1952–1957	Succeeded by James J. Crisona
