= Anthony S. Seminerio =

American politician

Anthony Seminerio

Member of the New York State Assembly
- In office January 1, 1979 – June 23, 2009
- Preceded by: Alfred A. DelliBovi
- Succeeded by: Michael G. Miller
- Constituency: 31st district (1979–1992); 38th district (1993–2009)

Personal details
- Born: February 15, 1935 New York City, New York
- Died: January 6, 2011 (aged 75) Federal Correctional Complex, Butner, North Carolina
- Party: Democratic Party

Anthony S. Seminerio (February 15, 1935 – January 6, 2011) was an American politician from New York.

== Life ==
Seminerio graduated from the New York Institute of Technology with a Bachelor's degree. Then he became a corrections officer. He was an executive board member representing the Correction Officers' Benevolent Association where he engaged in negotiations that forced him to travel between New York City and the state capital of Albany, New York. In addition to being the collective bargaining negotiator for members of the Dept. of Corrections Seminerio also served as the founder and treasurer of the New York State Peace Officers Association.

He was a member of the New York State Assembly from 1979 to 2009, sitting in the 183rd, 184th, 185th, 186th, 187th, 188th, 189th, 190th, 191st, 192nd, 193rd, 194th, 195th, 196th, 197th and 198th New York State Legislatures. He represented the neighborhoods of Richmond Hill, Queens and Glendale, Queens. As a member of the New York Assembly, he was one of the more conservative members of the New York City delegation. He opposed abortions, supported capital punishment, and took a tough stance on crime. Thus often at odds with Speaker Sheldon Silver, he endorsed several prominent Republican candidates in the past, including Rudy Giuliani, George Pataki, and Al D'Amato.

He resigned on June 23, 2009, following an indictment for alleged Honest services fraud delivered by the U.S. Attorney for the Southern District of New York. In June 2009, he pleaded guilty to taking bribes disguised as consulting fees from hospitals and medical services companies in exchange for official action on their behalf. Among those accused of bribing Seminerio was Bernard G. Ehrlich, who had previously been convicted of crimes in the Wedtech scandal. He died on January 6, 2011, while serving a prison term in the Federal Correctional Complex, Butner in Butner, North Carolina. His conviction was abated because his appeal was still pending when he died.

New York State Assembly
Preceded by Alfred A. DelliBovi	New York State Assembly; 31st District; 1979–1992	Succeeded by Gregory W. Meeks
Preceded by Frederick D. Schmidt	New York State Assembly; 38th District; 1993–2009	Succeeded by Michael G. Miller
