= The Shops at Atlas Park =

- Logo
- Location: Glendale, Queens, New York, U.S.
- Coordinates: 40.708464°N 73.868284°W
- Address: 80-00 Cooper Ave; Glendale, NY 11385
- Opened: April 27, 2006; 20 years ago
- Developer: ATCO Properties
- Manager: Ashkenazy Acquisition Corporation
- Owner: Ben Ashkenazy
- Floors: 4
- Parking: Garage; short-term parking on the center oval

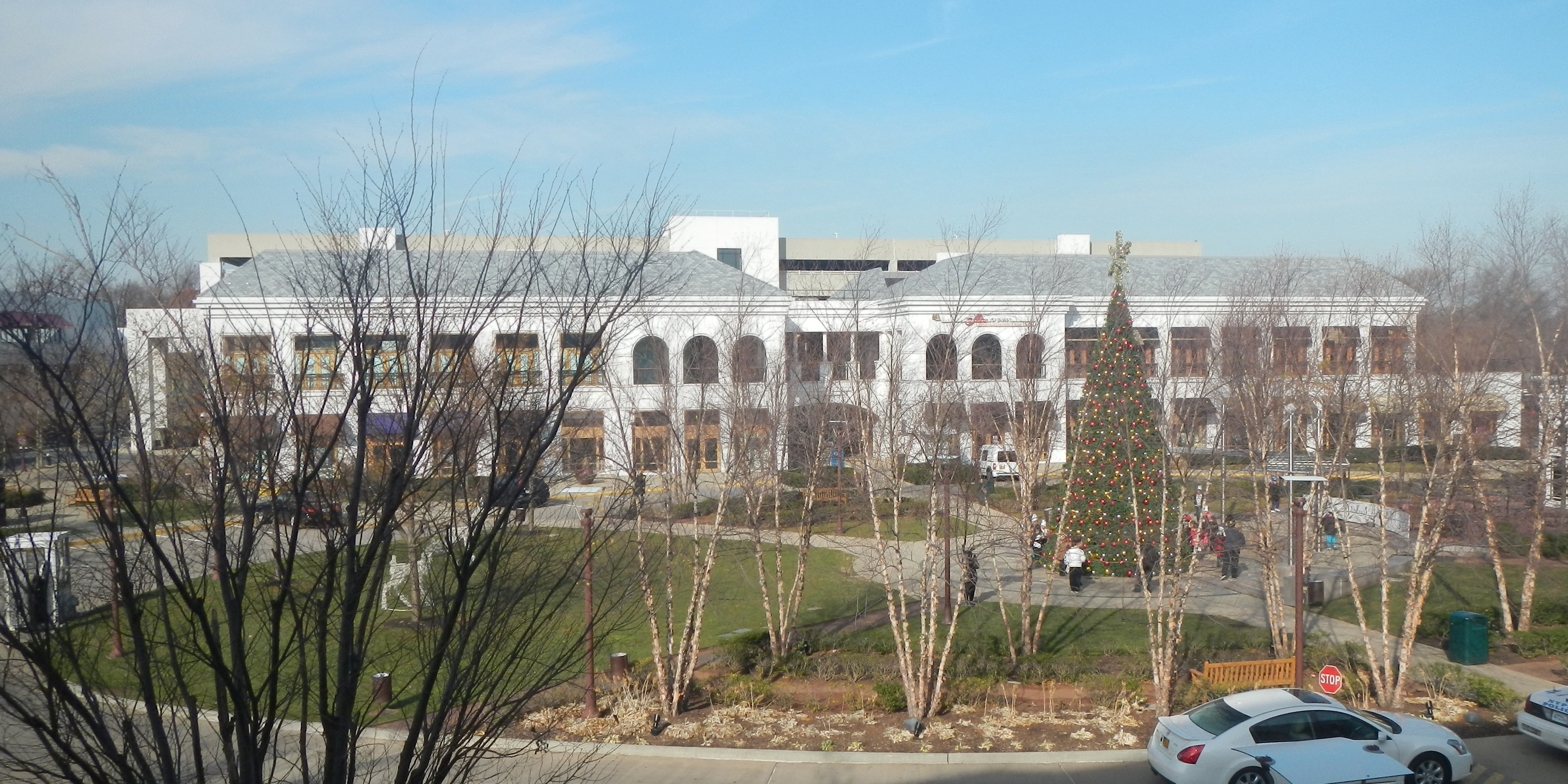
Park and north shops

The Shops at Atlas Park is an open-air shopping mall at Cooper Avenue and 80th Street in the Glendale neighborhood of Queens, New York City, United States.

The Shops at Atlas Park was opened in April 2006 by ATCO Properties, encompassing the site of the former 25-acre (100,000 m^{2}) Atlas Terminals industrial park, both of which were named after bodybuilder Charles Atlas who resided in nearby Middle Village.

== History ==
What is now Atlas Park began as 19 acres (7.7 ha) of farmland between Cooper Avenue and Dry Harbor Road (present-day 80th Street (Note: Though Dry Harbor Road still exists, the portion south of Furmanville Avenue is now called 80th Street)). In June 1902, the American Grass Products Company purchased the land and constructed a 40,000-square-foot (3,700 m^{2}) brick factory, and in 1903 a power plant was constructed. In 1922, Henry Hemmerdinger (whose family operates ATCO Properties) purchased a warehouse in the area, which would evolve into Atlas Terminals. In its heyday in the 1950s, the industrial park housed companies such as General Electric, Kraft, Westinghouse, and New York Telephone. Freight operations to and from the terminal were facilitated by the Long Island Rail Road's Montauk Branch at the park's south end. It was redeveloped in the 2000s after years of struggling to find tenants. Four of the buildings ranging in size from 13,000 to 93,000 square feet were renovated as part of the center, and sixteen buildings in the vicinity of Cooper Avenue and 80th Street were demolished and replaced by a 2.3-acre (9,300 m^{2}) landscaped park.

The shops were opened in late April 2006. Major tenants in the center include Regal Cinemas, TJ Maxx, Ulta Beauty, Foot Locker, California Pizza Kitchen, Chili's, Johnny Rockets, White House Black Market, and New York Sports Club. Beginning on February 19, 2009, Atlas Park went into foreclosure, with control going to lenders Caylon Bank and Société Générale (both based in France). The complex was sold to The Macerich Company in February 2011 for $54 million. In 2025, Ben Ashkenazy bought the Shops at Atlas Park for $72 million.

== Transportation ==
The mall is served by the Q29, Q47 and Q54 bus routes. The reroutings of the Q54 and what was then the Q45 (now the southern half of the Q47) to serve the mall in 2007 and 2008, respectively, were controversial because MTA Chairman H. Dale Hemmerdinger was also the president of ATCO Properties.

The closest New York City Subway station to the shops, the Middle Village–Metropolitan Avenue station (served by the M train), is 1.3 miles (2.1 km) away.
