= David Orkin =

Member-elect of the New York State Assembly from the 38th district
- Assuming office January 1, 2027
- Succeeding: Jenifer Rajkumar

Personal details
- Born: c.1991 (age 34–35)
- Party: Democratic
- Other political affiliations: Democratic Socialists of America (Note: The Democratic Socialists of America (DSA) are not a registered political party. Instead, they are a political organization for those with democratic socialist ideologies.)
- Education: Vassar College (BA); CUNY School of Law (JD)

David Aaron Orkin (born c.1991) is an American attorney and politician who is a member-elect of the New York State Assembly from the 38th district. A member of the Democratic Party and NYC-DSA, he defeated incumbent Jenifer Rajkumar in the primary election in 2026.

== Early life and career ==
Orkin grew up in Rockville, Maryland, the son of colorectal surgeon Bruce Orkin and a Jewish Mexican immigrant mother who grew up in Tijuana and San Diego; her grandparents had emigrated to Mexico to escape pogroms. In a February 2015 Mondoweiss article written by him, Orkin stated he grew up attending the Jewish summer camp Camp Ramah in the Berkshires from age 8 in 1999 until age 18 where he received a Zionist education. He attended Birthright Israel after his freshman year at Vassar College in 2010, an experience which brought him to empathize with Palestinians.

After graduating from Vassar with a Bachelor of Arts in geography in 2013, Orkin worked as a program director at immigration-focused educational organization BorderLinks in Tucson, Arizona. While in Tucson, he started a local chapter of Jewish Voice for Peace in 2013/2014 and was involved in immigrant rights organizations No More Deaths and Mariposas sin Fronteras.

In 2022, Orkin graduated from CUNY School of Law with a Juris Doctor and joined immigrant rights organization Make the Road New York as a workers' rights attorney. He is a member of the United Auto Workers Local 2320.

== New York State Assembly ==
In the 2026 election, Orkin challenged incumbent Democrat Jenifer Rajkumar. He was endorsed by the NYC-DSA, Alexandria Ocasio-Cortez, and Claire Valdez, among others. Orkin's campaign sued to have Rajkumar kicked off the ballot over alleged petition fraud after numerous registered voters reported that Rajkumar's campaign had falsified their signatures in her nomination petitions including an Orkin campaign volunteer and a Queens Chronicle editor. The lawsuit was thrown out on procedural grounds by the Queens Supreme Court for not properly subpoenaing Rajkumar’s campaign workers associated with the fraud in April and an appeal was dismissed.

Orkin defeated Rajkumar in the June 23, 2026 Democratic primary election by 18% points. In November, Orkin won the general election, easily defeating Ruben D. Cruz II.

== Personal life ==
Orkin is Jewish, openly gay, and fluent in Spanish.
