= John T. Clancy =

American politician

John Thomas Clancy

Borough President of Queens
- In office 1959–1962
- Preceded by: James J. Crisona
- Succeeded by: Mario J. Cariello

Personal details
- Born: April 11, 1903 Long Island City, New York, U.S.
- Died: May 14, 1985 (aged 82) Palm Beach, Florida, U.S.

John Thomas Clancy (April 11, 1903 – May 14, 1985), also known by his nickname Pat Clancy, was a lawyer, Democratic politician and surrogate judge from Queens, New York City.

== Biography ==
Clancy was born in Long Island City to Patrick and Mary Clancy, both from Limerick, Ireland, in 1903. After graduating from St. Francis Xavier High School, Clancy received his law degree from Fordham University School of Law. Prior to holding elected office, he served as the assistant state attorney general from 1939 to 1942, and as special assistant United States Attorney from 1951 to 1953. He served as president of the Queens Bar Association and the Queens Chamber of Commerce.

In 1955, Clancy failed to secure his party's nomination for borough president, but in 1959 he was named to serve the remainder of James J. Crisona's term in that office when Crisona was elected to the state Supreme Court. Clancy won the 1959 special election to complete the remainder of the term, and then won his own term in 1961. Clancy resigned from the office in 1962 after his election that year for Queens Country Surrogate Judge. He served as surrogate judge until July 1971. His career ended controversially, because although he had more than two years left until he would be required by law to step down, he resigned the day after the filing deadline for the party primaries. This cleared the way for his friend and colleague, Louis D. Laurino from the New York Court of Claims, to succeed him in office.

Following his resignation, Clancy moved to Palm Beach, Florida, where he died of a stroke in 1985 at the age of 82.

Political offices
| Preceded by James J. Crisona | Borough President of Queens; 1959–1962 | Succeeded by Mario J. Cariello |
