= DJ Rekha =

British DJ (born 1971)

- Born: Rekha Malhotra; 2 May 1971 (age 55); United Kingdom
- Origin: New York City
- Genres: Bhangra
- Occupations: Disc jockey, Producer
- Instruments: Turntable, Sampler
- Years active: 1997–present
- Label: Koch
- Website: www.djrekha.com/basementbhangra.html

DJ Rekha (born Rekha Malhotra, 1971) is a London-born musician, DJ, producer, curator, and activist. They have been credited with pioneering Bhangra music in North America. Their first album, DJ Rekha Presents Basement Bhangra, released in October 2007 on Koch Records, fuses the Indian genre of bhangra music with international hip-hop and drum beats.

== Early life ==
DJ Rekha spent the first year of their life in London, and the following three years in New Delhi, India. They credit this time in India as critical for exposure to Punjabi, the primary language of bhangra. They returned to London briefly until their family moved to Queens, New York. DJ Rekha spent most of their adolescence in Westbury, Long Island, where they attended public schools whose pupils were predominantly Black, and currently lives in Jackson Heights, Queens. They graduated from Queens College with a degree in Urban Studies while simultaneously experimenting and honing their craft on the turntables.

== Music ==
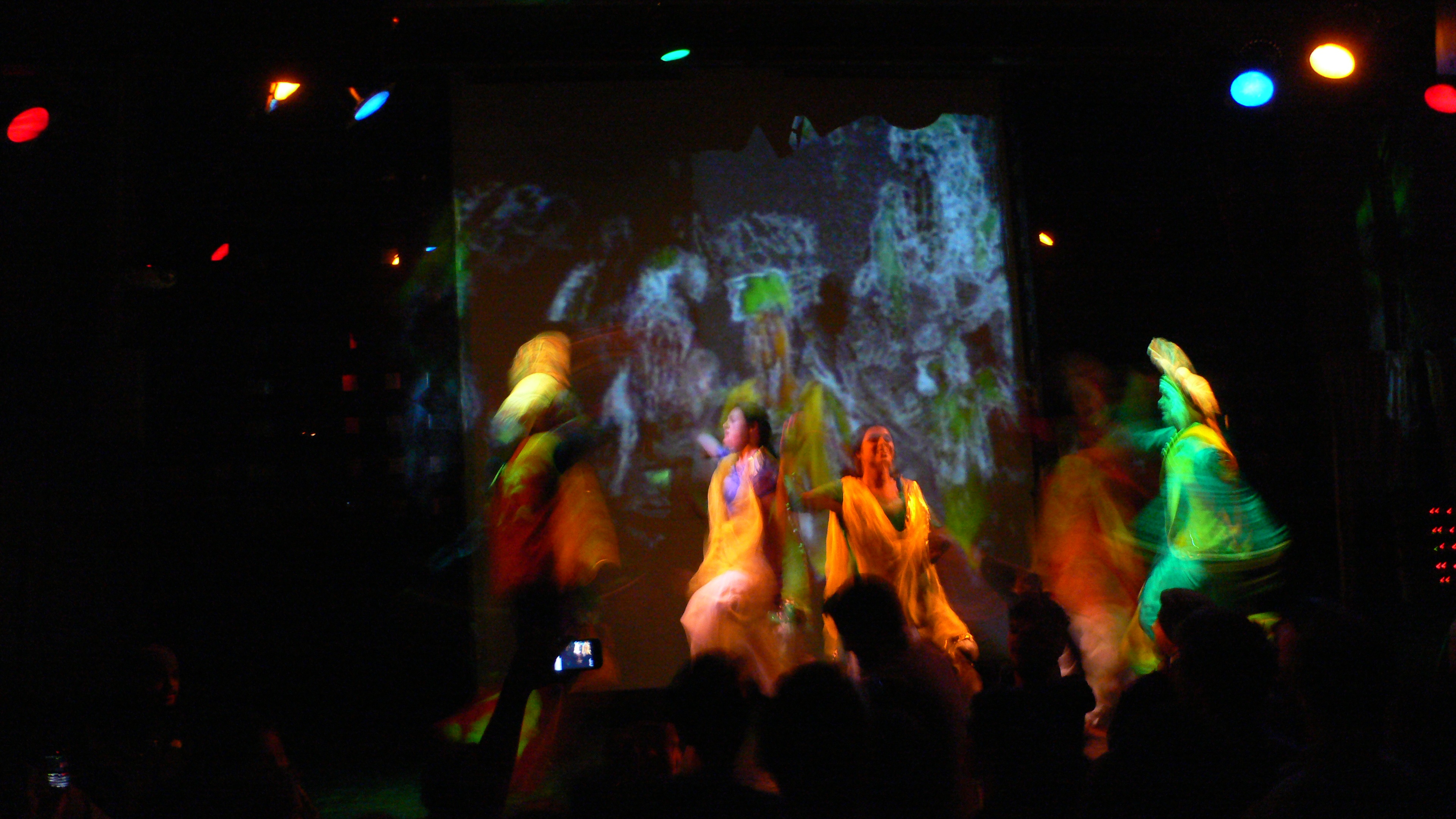
Bhangra dancers at DJ Rekha's "Basement Bhangra" show at SOBs, in 2011

DJ Rekha launched a monthly event known as Basement Bhangra at SOB's on Varick Street. From 1997 - 2017, Basement Bhangra popularized the traditional-modern bhangra blend, making the genre a part of the NYC club scene. DJ Rekha often intentionally used Basement Bhangra as a political platform to raise awareness of systemic injustices, and raise money for or advertise events by New York City organizations working to improve the lives of people of color, such as DRUM. To improve inclusivity, each party began with a bhangra dance lesson, and as of 2016, participants arriving before 8pm could get free admission. The final 20th anniversary show was held at Central Park's Summerstage on August 6, 2017.

As a volunteer, DJ Rekha DJed fundraising benefit shows to help raise money for Hurricane Katrina victims, for South Asians Against Police Brutality, for progressive South Asian political candidates, and other organizations.

DJ Rekha has brought South Asian music to New York by spinning at events like P.S. 1's Warm Up Series, Central Park's Summerstage, Prospect Park’s Celebrate Brooklyn, Brooklyn Museum's First Saturdays, and the annual flagship Loving Day celebration held in New York City. They arranged the music for Bridge and Tunnel, the [Tony Award] winning Off-Broadway show. Newsweek recognized them as one of the most influential South Asians in the US, and they have received accolades from The New York Times, CNN, The Fader, The Village Voice, and The Washington Post, among others.

Their debut album, DJ Rekha Presents Basement Bhangra, is a 17 track mix CD with four exclusive tracks including two original productions from Rekha. In this album, DJ Rekha collaborated with Wyclef Jean, Panjabi MC, and Bikram Singh, among others. The album weaves Punjabi folk traditions, dance hall rhythms from the U.S., U.K. and Jamaica, and DJ techniques that are 100% New York.

Since 2010, DJ Rekha has hosted 'Bhangra and Beyond', a weekly radio show on BTRtoday.

== Equipment ==
- Turntable
- Roland SP-808 sampler

== Entrepreneur ==
In 2000, DJ Rekha founded Sangament (sangam is Hindi for "confluence" — a place where two rivers flow together), a production company that produces live concerts and provides music consulting services to record labels, cultural institutions, media companies, and corporations. DJ Rekha produces live events and their monthly parties, Basement Bhangra and Bollywood Disco through Sangament, Inc.

DJ Rekha founded Basement Bhangra in 1997 in New York. It occurred on the first Thursday of every month and became an international phenomenon, drawing an extremely diverse audience. It started with dance lessons and then turned into a dance party. It received international press, being featured on the cover of Billboard magazine and in Dutch and Japanese television.
