= 75th Avenue–61st Street Historic District =

Historic district in Queens, New York

- U.S. National Register of Historic Places
- U.S. Historic district
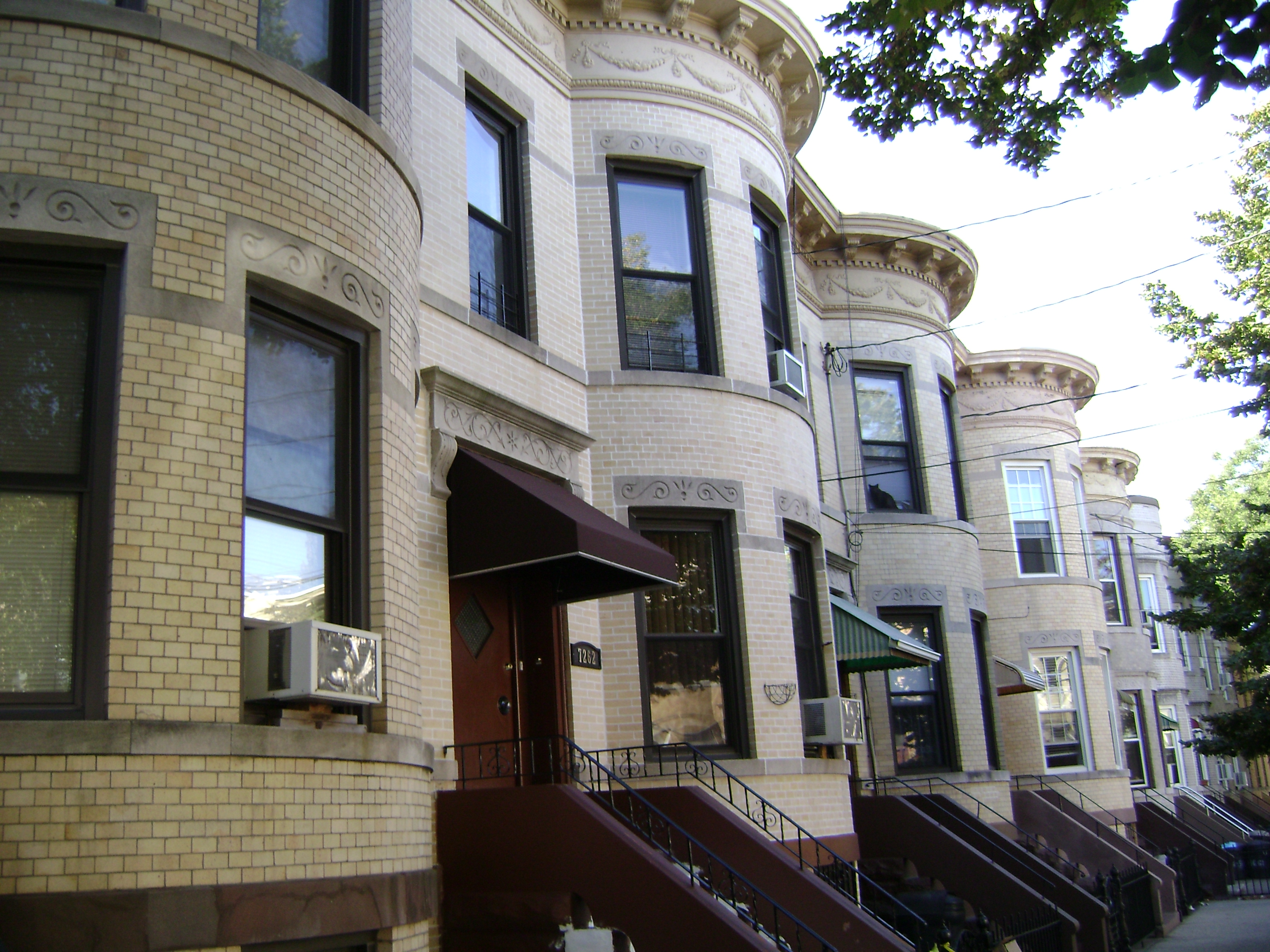

- Location within New York Location within the United States
- Location: Roughly bounded by St. Felix Ave., 60th Lane, 60th and 62nd Sts., New York, New York
- Coordinates: 40°41′55″N 73°53′41″W
- Area: 10 acres (4.0 ha)
- Built: 1910
- Architect: Fritz, Charles; Berger, Louis, & Co.
- Architectural style: Bungalow/Craftsman, Late Victorian, Arts and Crafts
- MPS: Ridgewood MRA
- NRHP reference No.: 83001764
- Added to NRHP: September 30, 1983

75th Avenue–61st Street Historic District is a national historic district in Glendale, Queens, New York. It includes 183 contributing buildings built between 1910 and 1925. They consist mainly of two story brick row houses with one apartment per floor. Building features include round and box front dwellings, cast stone detailing, brownstone stoops, pressed metal cornices, and covered porches.

It includes the following addresses:

- 60th Lane
  - 75-02 to 75-50
  - 75-01 to 75-49
- 61st St
  - 72-28 to 72-72
  - 72-31 to 72-69
  - 75-02 to 75-50
  - 75-01 to 75-49
- 62nd St
  - 75-02 to 75-34
  - 75-15 to 75-29
  - 74-18 to 74-46

The district was listed on the National Register of Historic Places in 1983.
