= Irving Mosberg =

New York politician and judge (1908–1973)

Member of the New York State Senate
- In office January 14, 1958 – December 1967
- Preceded by: James J. Crisona
- Succeeded by: John J. Santucci
- Constituency: 6th district (1958–1965); 10th district (1966); 11th district (1967)

Personal details
- Born: May 6, 1908 New York City, New York, U.S.
- Died: April 25, 1973 (aged 64)
- Party: Democratic

Irving Mosberg (May 6, 1908 – April 25, 1973) was an American lawyer and politician from New York.

== Life ==
He was born on May 6, 1908, in New York City. He attended the public schools and Morris High School in the Bronx. He attended New York University School of Commerce for one year, and graduated from St. John's University School of Law in 1930. He was admitted to the bar in 1931. He practiced law in New York City, and lived in Laurelton, Queens.

Mosberg was an Assistant D.A. of Queens County when he was elected on January 14, 1958, to the New York State Senate, to fill the vacancy caused by the election of James J. Crisona as Borough President of Queens. Mosberg was re-elected several times, and remained in the State Senate until 1967, sitting in the 171st, 172nd, 173rd, 174th, 175th, 176th and 177th New York State Legislatures. In November 1967, Mosberg was elected to the New York City Civil Court.

He died on April 25, 1973. He was Jewish.

== Sources ==
New York State Senate
Preceded by James J. Crisona	Member of the New York State Senate from the 6th district 1958–1965	Succeeded by Norman F. Lent
Preceded by Simon J. Liebowitz	Member of the New York State Senate from the 10th district 1966	Succeeded by Seymour R. Thaler
Preceded by Jack E. Bronston	Member of the New York State Senate from the 11th district 1967	Succeeded by John J. Santucci
