= Central Avenue Historic District (Queens) =

Historic district in Queens, New York

- U.S. National Register of Historic Places
- U.S. Historic district
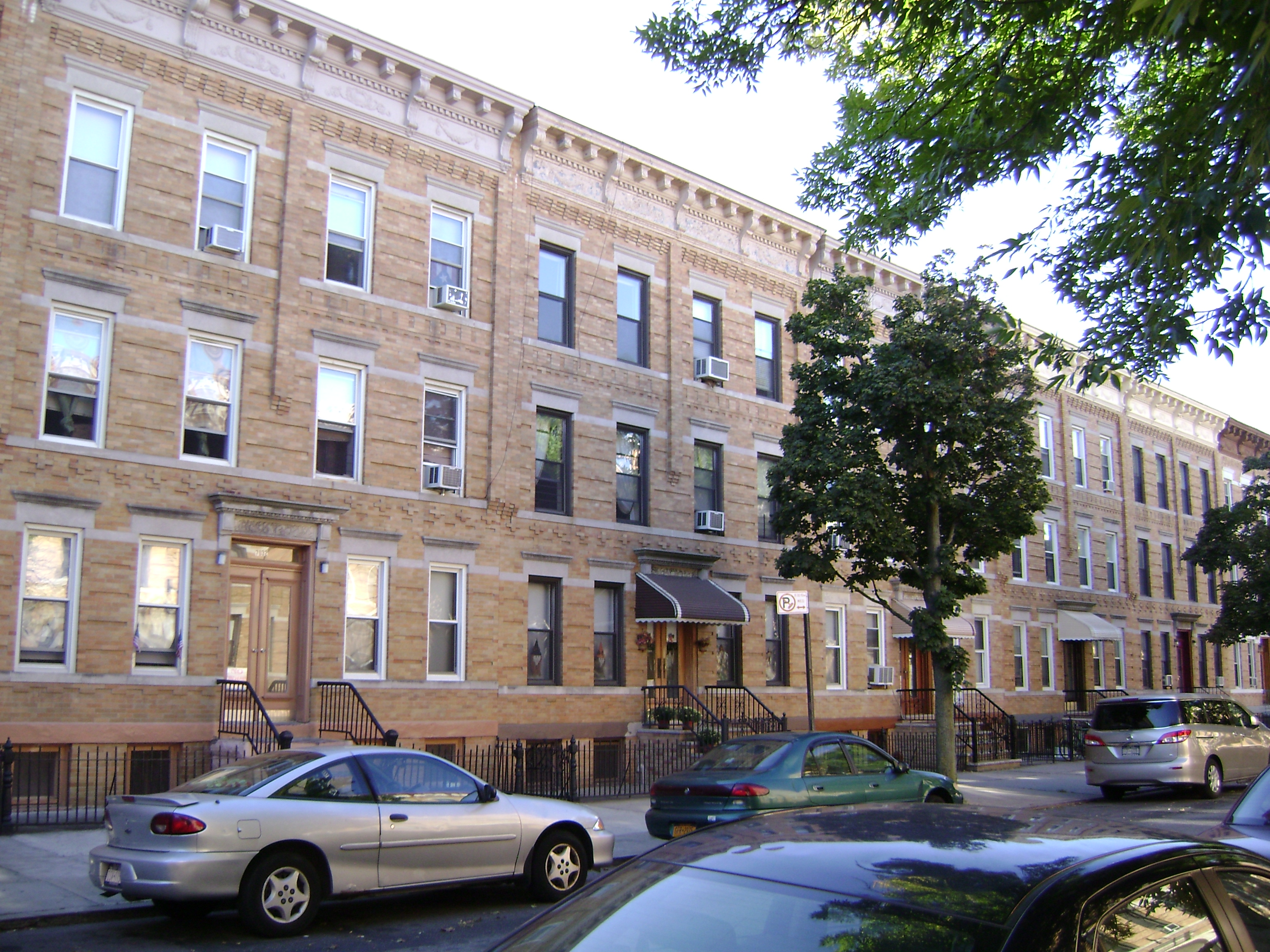

- Location within New York City Location within New York Location within the United States
- Location: Roughly bounded by Myrtle and 70th Ave., and 65th and 66th Sts., New York City, New York
- Coordinates: 40°42′10″N 73°53′25″W
- Area: 10 acres (4.0 ha)
- Built: 1916
- Architect: Meyer, Henry W.
- Architectural style: Mathews Flats
- MPS: Ridgewood MRA
- NRHP reference No.: 83001761
- Added to NRHP: September 30, 1983

Central Avenue Historic District is a national historic district in Glendale, Queens, New York. It includes 104 contributing buildings built in 1916. They consist of three story brick tenements with two apartments per floor. Buildings feature front facades and amber iron-spot brick.

It was listed on the National Register of Historic Places in 1983.
