= Joey De Jesus =

American politician

Joey De Jesus is an American writer, performer, community activist, and political candidate.

Their work includes the poetry collection NOCT: The Threshold of Madness, which was a selection of the 2019 Atlas Review chapbook contest, and the poetry collection HOAX, forthcoming from The Operating System in 2020. They have received numerous awards and fellowships for their work, including a 2020 ArtFP grant from BRIC Arts Media, and a 2017 New York Foundation for the Arts fellowship.

De Jesus is a Democrat in New York City and a former candidate for New York State Assembly District 38.

== Early life and education ==
De Jesus was born in The Bronx, New York and grew up in to a working-class family in Soundview, New York, and as a child attended Ethical Culture Fieldston School. After graduating from Oberlin College, De Jesus went on to earn two master's degrees in poetry from Sarah Lawrence College and performance studies from New York University.

== Career ==
De Jesus's poems have been published widely, including in The Brooklyn Rail, Drunken Boat, The Academy of American Poets, Guernica, Brooklyn Magazine, and elsewhere.

In 2017, De Jesus's work was part of a group exhibition at the New Museum. That same year, they received the NYFA fellowship.

In 2019, De Jesus received an ArtFP grant from BRIC Arts Media. The ensuing project, HOAX, was open for digital exhibition in April 2020, and focused, according to the press release, on "intersections of poetry (concrete, procedural, and lyric), interactive technology, mysticism, and performance... [making] a living book in sections"

Also in 2019, De Jesus's chapbook NOCT: The Threshold of Madness won the 2019 Atlas Review open submission prize. The chapbook started in 2016 as a hybrid project centering on anti-Blackness and an erasure of a how-to book on black magic, and was profiled in VIDA: Women in Literary Arts. According to series editor Natalie Eilbert, the resulting book features "language... at once devastating as it is curated by a mastermind. Here, agency is pushed under the lens as with everything else."

From 2017 to 2019, De Jesus served as a founder and curator (with Shanekia Mcontosh) of the TRIPTYCH performance series at Basilica Hudson's annual Soundscape festival.

De Jesus currently serves as an adjunct lecturer at Borough of Manhattan Community College.

In 2020, De Jesus's debut collection, HOAX, is slated to be published with The Operating System. The collection is cross-genre and spread out across several different mediums, including a book of ekphrastic poems drawing on artist Yoshitaka Amano's tarot deck, an astrological divination chart, several laser-cut leather scrolls, and a series of prayer poems, among other components.

== Political career ==
In fall 2019, De Jesus announced their candidacy for State Assembly, running against incumbent Democrat Michael G. Miller and challenger Jenifer Rajkumar on a platform of a Statewide Homes Guarantee, reducing NYPD enrollment, and supporting the Boycott, Divestment and Sanctions movement. Reporting on the campaign, City & State referred to De Jesus as "the candidate with the most left-leaning platform" in the Assembly race.

In October 2019, De Jesus spoke as a representative of the Ridgewood Tenants Union at a Queens Community Board 5 meeting, arguing the importance of a planned homeless shelter in the area, against local criticism.

In November 2019, De Jesus organized against the presence of a Department of Homeland Security armored-truck-based arrest in the neighborhood, declaiming it in the Queens Daily Eagle.

In March 2020, De Jesus gathered enough signatures to be placed on the ballot for the state primary.

== Personal life ==
De Jesus identifies as "the only genderqueer anti-capitalist [candidate] running for State Assembly." Since 2015, De Jesus has lived in Ridgewood, Queens.

In addition to their political work, De Jesus serves as poetry co-editor for Apogee Journal.

De Jesus is the survivor of a home invasion, which they trace to the formation of their identity as a poet.

They are also a member of the Democratic Socialists of America

== Bibliography ==
- NOCT: The Threshold of Madness, The Atlas Review, 2019
- Writing Voice Into The Archive, University of California, Berkeley Center for Race and Gender, 2019
- HOAX, The Operating System, 2020
