= Cooper Avenue Row Historic District =

Historic district in Queens, New York

- U.S. National Register of Historic Places
- U.S. Historic district
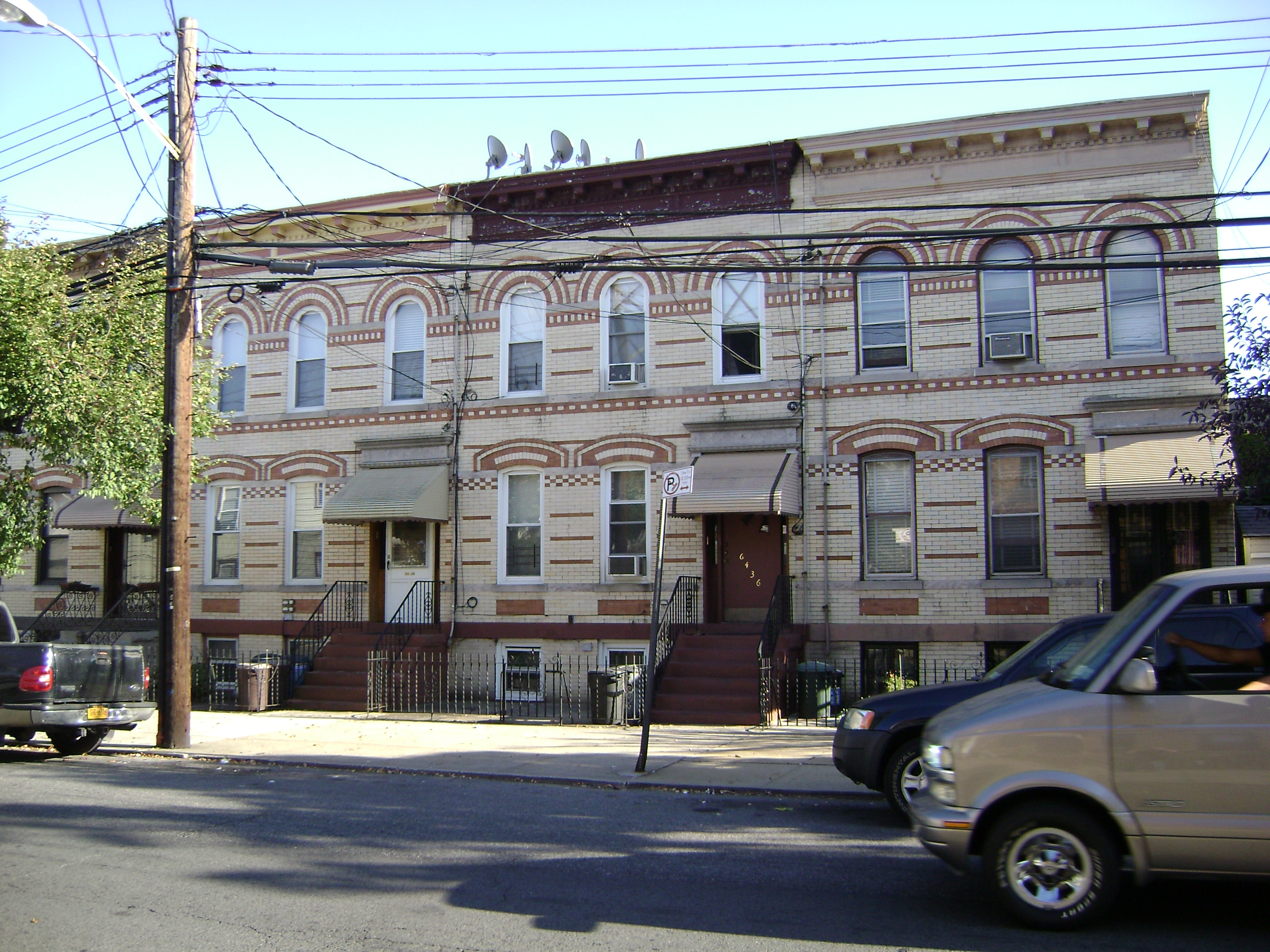

- Location within New York City Location within New York Location within the United States
- Location: 6434-6446 Cooper Ave., New York, New York
- Coordinates: 40°41′53″N 73°53′27″W
- Area: 0.5 acres (0.20 ha)
- Built: 1915
- Built by: Wagner, Albin
- Architect: Berger, Louis, & Co.
- Architectural style: Renaissance, Romanesque
- MPS: Ridgewood MRA
- NRHP reference No.: 83001765
- Added to NRHP: September 30, 1983

Cooper Avenue Row Historic District is a national historic district in Glendale, Queens, New York. It includes seven contributing buildings built in 1915. They consist of two story, flat front brick rowhouse dwellings with one apartment per floor. They are constructed of yellow brick with burnt orange brick details. They feature some of Glendale's most striking and elaborate brickwork.

It was listed on the National Register of Historic Places in 1983.
