= James J. Crisona =

American politician

Borough President of Queens
- In office 1958–1958
- Preceded by: James A. Lundy
- Succeeded by: John T. Clancy

Personal details
- Born: August 30, 1907 Brooklyn, New York, U.S.
- Died: September 4, 2003 (aged 96) Manhattan, New York, U.S.

James J. Crisona (August 30, 1907 – September 4, 2003) was an American lawyer and politician. He served New York as a state senator; assemblyman; borough president; and Supreme Court justice.

== Life ==
Crisona was born on August 30, 1907, in Brooklyn, New York City. He graduated from New York University School of Law in 1931, and subsequently joined the Manhattan law firm of Crisona Brothers, where he was senior partner from 1945 to 1957. He lived in Queens and entered politics as a Democrat.

Crisona was elected on November 6, 1945, to the New York State Assembly (Queens Co., 12th D.), to fill the vacancy caused by the death of John H. Ferril, and took his seat in the 165th New York State Legislature in January 1946. In November 1946, he ran for re-election, but was defeated by Henry Schneider Jr.

Crisona was a member of the New York State Senate from 1955 to 1957, sitting in the 170th and 171st New York State Legislatures. Among his legislative achievements, he is credited with helping transfer control of LaGuardia Airport and Idlewild Airport (now John F. Kennedy Airport) to the Port Authority.

In November 1957, he was elected Borough President of Queens, unseating the Republican incumbent James A. Lundy. Crisona was accused of offering bribes during the campaign by James A. Phillips, then a leader of the Queens County Democrats and a rival for the nomination. He appeared voluntarily before a grand jury, which cleared him of all charges in 1959. He took office in 1958, but only stayed until the end of the year, when he stepped down to take a seat on the New York Supreme Court. He remained on the bench until 1976 when he resumed his private practice.

Crisona died on September 4, 2003, in a nursing home in Manhattan.

New York State Assembly
Preceded by John H. Ferril	New York State Assembly; Queens County, 12th District; 1946	Succeeded by Henry Schneider Jr.
New York State Senate
Preceded by Bernard Tompkins	New York State Senate; 6th District; 1955–1957	Succeeded by Irving Mosberg
Political offices
Preceded by James A. Lundy	Borough President of Queens; 1958	Succeeded by John T. Clancy
