= Maurice A. FitzGerald =

New York politician

Borough President of Queens
- In office 1950–1951
- Preceded by: James A. Burke
- Succeeded by: Joseph F. Mafera

Personal details
- Born: January 9, 1897 Brooklyn, New York, U.S.
- Died: August 25, 1951 (aged 54) Star Lake, New York, U.S.

Maurice A. FitzGerald (January 9, 1897 – August 25, 1951) was a Democratic politician from Queens, New York City.

== Life ==
FitzGerald was born in Brooklyn, New York in 1897. By the age of 14 he began working as a postal clerk. He soon moved to South Ozone Park, Queens and became involved in southern Queens civic organizations by the 1920s.

He was a member of the New York State Assembly (Queens Co., 5th D.) in 1929, 1930, 1931, 1932, 1933, 1934, 1935, 1936 and 1937.

He was elected sheriff of Queens County in 1937, then named the Borough Public Works Commissioner in 1942. In 1949, he was elected Borough President of Queens. He did not live to the end of his first term, dying of a heart attack while vacationing in Star Lake, New York in 1951. He is interred at St. John's Cemetery in Middle Village, Queens.

Maurice A. FitzGerald Playground in South Ozone Park, and Public School No. 199 (Maurice A. FitzGerald School) in Sunnyside, Queens, commemorate the former borough president.

New York State Assembly
| Preceded by William F. Brunner | New York State Assembly; Queens County, 5th District; 1929–1937 | Succeeded by William F. Dailey |
Political offices
| Preceded by James A. Burke | Borough President of Queens; 1950–1951 | Succeeded by Joseph F. Mafera |
