= Queens Chronicle =

- Type: Weekly newspaper
- Founder: Susan Merzon
- Publisher: Schneps Media
- Editor-in-chief: Peter C. Mastrosimone
- Founded: November 1978
- Headquarters: Glendale, New York
- Circulation: 160,000
- OCLC number: 55768832
- Website: queenschronicle.com

The Queens Chronicle is a free weekly newspaper based in the New York City neighborhood of Glendale, Queens. It was founded in November 1978 as The Paper by Susan Merzon. Her son, Mark Weidler, was the paper's publisher for more than 30 years before selling it to Schneps Media in October 2026.

In 1984, it expanded beyond its Howard Beach constituency and was renamed the Queens Chronicle. In 1994, the paper's offices suffered a devastating fire.

The Chronicle has nine separate editions for various regions of Queens. Every Thursday, new editions of the Chronicle are distributed at more than 950 locations throughout the borough. As of May 2015, the Chronicle publishes nine different weekly papers with a total circulation of 160,000, reaching 400,000 readers. Peter C. Mastrosimone is editor-in-chief since 2008.
