= South Richmond Hill, Queens =

Neighborhood in New York

Coordinates: 40°41′28″N 73°49′36″W

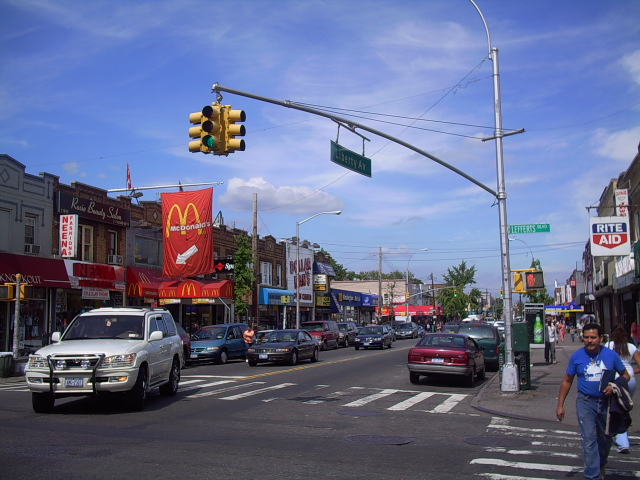
Liberty Avenue at Lefferts Boulevard

South Richmond Hill is a residential and commercial neighborhood in the New York City borough of Queens. The neighborhood is a subsection of greater Richmond Hill. It is located South of Atlantic Avenue. South Richmond Hill is part of New York's 32nd State Assembly District and since 1991 has been represented by Assembly Member Vivian E. Cook.

== Nicknames ==
South Richmond Hill is known as Little Guyana for its large Indo-Caribbean American (mostly Indo-Guyanese and some Indo-Trinidadians) population, centered along Liberty Avenue, the neighborhood's business corridor. It is also called Little Punjab due to its large Punjabi American (especially Sikh American) population.

== Demographics ==
According to 2020 census data, the population of South Richmond Hill was 47,430. The racial makeup of the neighborhood was American Indian and Alaska Native (1,640), Asian (16,791), Black or African American (6,355), Hispanic or Latino (8,495), Native Hawaiian and Other Pacific Islander (92), Not Hispanic or Latino (1,867), Some Other Race (12,780), Two or More Races (7,204), and White (2,568).

== Post Office and ZIP Code ==
South Richmond Hill is covered by the ZIP Code 11419. The United States Post Office operates one post office nearby:

- South Richmond Hill Post Office – 11704 101st Avenue

== Parks and Recreation ==
Phil "Scooter" Rizzuto Park is on Atlantic Avenue, 95th Ave between 127th Street and 125th Street. Formerly known as Smokey Oval Park, it was renamed in 2019 after American Major League Baseball player, Phil Rizzuto who played for the New York Yankees and was elected into the National Baseball Hall of Fame in 1994.
