= James A. Burke (New York politician) =

American politician

Borough President of Queens
- In office 1942–1949
- Preceded by: George U. Harvey
- Succeeded by: Maurice A. FitzGerald

Personal details
- Born: March 3, 1890 Brooklyn, New York, U.S.
- Died: September 12, 1965 (aged 75) Little Neck, New York, U.S.

James A. Burke (March 3, 1890 – September 12, 1965) was a Democratic politician from Queens, New York City and served as its borough president for eight years.

Burke was born in Brooklyn, New York in 1890 but was orphaned when he was 8 years old. After high school he took night classes at New York University while he worked. In 1914 he moved to Queens, where he became active in many civic organizations. During the first World War he worked as a civilian at the Brooklyn Navy Yard, eventually becoming superintendent of stock in charge of $60 million worth of supplies.

After the war, he had various jobs in purchasing and accounting. He had leadership positions in two Queens civic organizations. He was a member of the New York State Assembly (Queens Co., 4th D.) in 1931, 1932, 1933 and 1935. While there, he championed Queens issues, including the construction of the Grand Central Parkway.

In 1941, he won election as borough president of Queens, beating the Republican incumbent George U. Harvey. While in office, he focused on transportation and taxes in the borough. He won two terms to the office, and resigned in 1949. He did not seek any further political offices.

He died in his Little Neck, Queens, home in 1965.

New York State Assembly
Preceded by Joseph D. Nunan, Jr.	New York State Assembly; Queens County, 4th District; 1931–1933	Succeeded by Jay E. Rice
Preceded by Jay E. Rice	New York State Assembly; Queens County, 4th District; 1935	Succeeded by Daniel E. Fitzpatrick
Political offices
Preceded by George U. Harvey	Borough President of Queens; 1942–1949	Succeeded by Maurice A. FitzGerald
