= Joseph F. Mafera =

American politician

Borough President of Queens
- In office 1951–1951
- Preceded by: Maurice A. FitzGerald
- Succeeded by: James A. Lundy

Personal details
- Born: 1895 White Plans, New York, U.S.
- Died: February 12, 1967 (aged 71–72)

Joseph F. Mafera (1895 – February 12, 1967) was a Democratic politician from Queens, New York City who served briefly as Queens Borough President.

Mafera was born in White Plains, New York in 1895. He lived most of his life in Ridgewood, Queens and held a number of civil service jobs and political positions in Queens, including Queens Parks Department Superintendent and Commissioner of Borough Works. After the death of Queens Borough President Maurice A. FitzGerald in September 1951, Mafera was chosen to serve out the term. He had the shortest term of any Queens Borough President, serving only four months.

Mafera served on the New York City Tax Commission for ten years after his time as Borough President. He died on February 12, 1967. After his death, Glenridge Park in Ridgewood was renamed in his honor as Joseph F. Mafera Park.

Political offices
Preceded by Maurice A. FitzGerald	Borough President of Queens; September 1951 – December 1951	Succeeded by James A. Lundy
