= Michael G. Miller =

American politician

- Miller in 2010

Member of the New York State Assembly from the 38th district
- In office September 15, 2009 – December 31, 2020
- Preceded by: Anthony Seminerio
- Succeeded by: Jenifer Rajkumar

Personal details
- Born: December 12, 1960 (age 65) Brooklyn, New York
- Party: Democratic
- Education: Queens College
- Occupation: Politician
- Committees: Aging, Banks, Labor, Racing and Wagering, Veterans' Affairs
- Website: Official website

Michael G. Miller (born December 12, 1960) is an American politician and a Democratic former member of the New York State Assembly, representing the 38th Assembly District, which includes the Queens neighborhoods of Woodhaven, Ridgewood, Richmond Hill, Ozone Park and Glendale.

He has lived in Glendale for 40 years. Miller is a graduate of Archbishop Molloy High School and attended Queens College and the CUNA Management School at the University of Georgia. He was branch manager of the Tiger Federal Credit Union. He also served as member of Queens Community Board 5.

Miller has been a member of the New York State Assembly since 2009, when he won a special election held after the resignation of former Assemblyman Anthony Seminerio. Miller won the subsequent 2010 general election with 69 percent of the vote. Miller was defeated by Jenifer Rajkumar in the June 2020 Democratic primary.

== Early life and career ==
Miller was born to an Italian mother and German father, both first generation immigrants.

== New York State Assembly ==
=== Same sex marriage ===
On December 2, 2009, Miller sided with the conservative minority, by voting against a bill legalizing same-sex marriage. Miller voted against a similar bill that became the Marriage Equality Act in 2011.

== Controversy ==
=== Appointment ===
In New York, candidates for special election are nominated by the party's county executive's selection. Miller's party nomination was met with a lawsuit filed by fellow Democrats. His nomination was seen by some as a back room deal. Al Baldeo, who claims he was promised the nomination by Congressman Gregory Meeks, State Senators John Sampson and Malcolm Smith, argued that the selection process was undemocratic. Farouk Samaroo argued that the selection process was to prevent an Indian-American on the ballot.

=== Disclosure ===
The New York Daily News reported that Miller was among the Assemblymen that refuse to disclose his outside income. This came 14 weeks after the state legislature publicly supported and approved a bill requiring them to disclose their outside income. The bill that was vetoed by Governor David Paterson.

=== Harassment Investigation and Sanctions ===
Miller became the subject of a 2019 internal investigation by the Assembly Ethics Committee stemming from a harassment complaint filed by a female staffer. The committee found evidence of inappropriate and unprofessional conduct, though the review did not "support a finding that Miller engaged in harassment and/or discrimination." The investigation came to light in June 2020 when it was revealed that the committee's investigator uncovered multiple instances in which Miller discussed the case with outside parties in breach of confidentiality and with what the committee determined as having the "effect of intimidating potential witnesses." In August 2020, Assembly Speaker Carl Heastie announced that he would formally sanction Miller for these actions, following the committee's recommendation.

== Election results ==
- September 2009 special election, NYS Assembly, 38th AD

Michael G. Miller (DEM – IND – CON)	...	2,792
Donna Marie Caltabiano (REP)	...	1,458

- November 2010 general election, NYS Assembly, 38th AD

Michael G. Miller (DEM – IND – WOR)	...	9,204
Donna Marie Caltabiano (REP – CON)	...	4,010

New York State Assembly
Preceded by Anthony Seminerio	New York State Assembly, 38th District; 2009–2020	Succeeded by Jenifer Rajkumar
