= Glendale, Queens =

Neighborhood in New York City

Glendale
- Neighborhoods of Queens
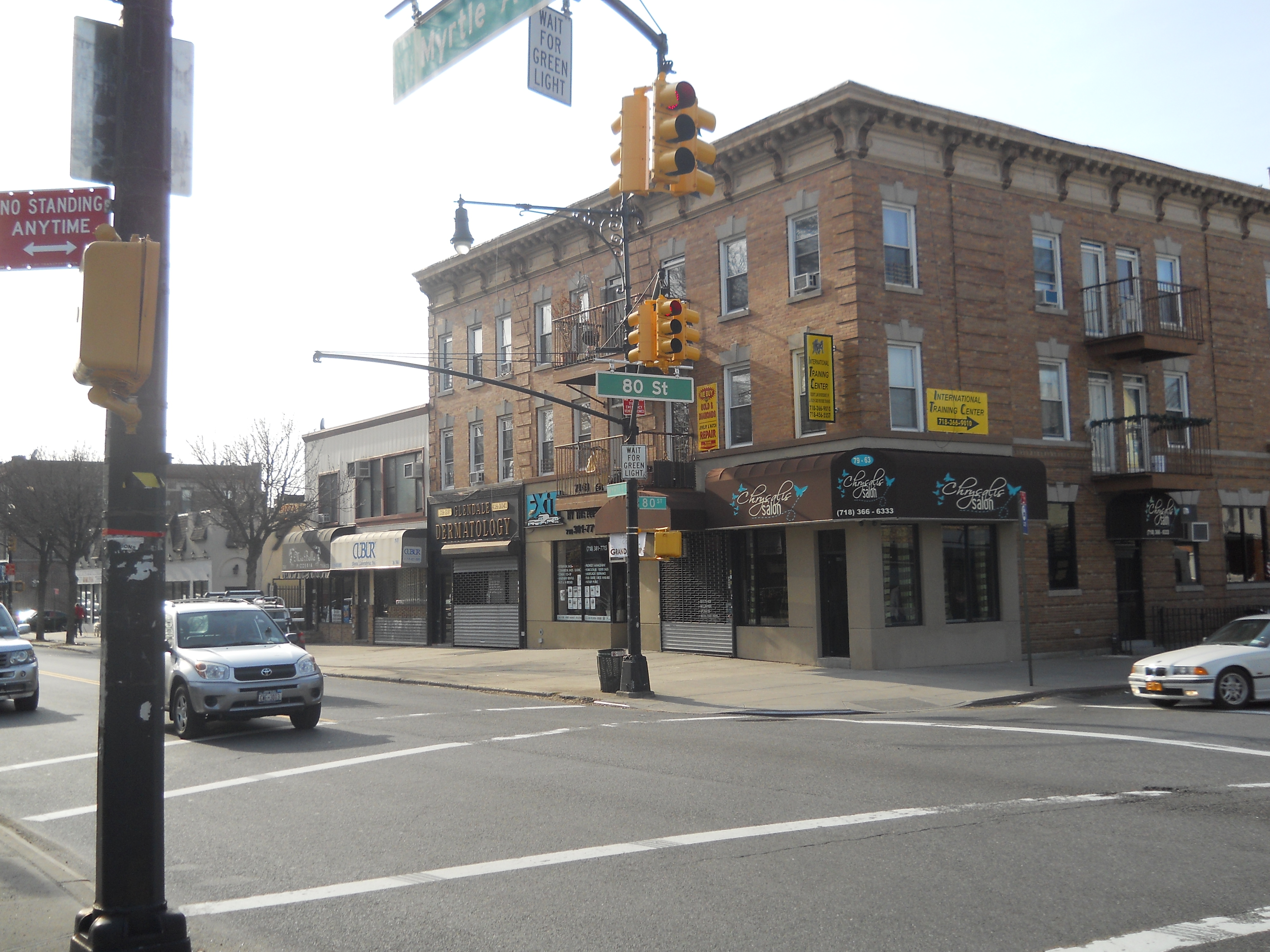
- Myrtle Avenue in Eastern Glendale
- Interactive map of Glendale
- Coordinates: 40.7°N 73.88°W
- Country: United States
- State: New York
- City: New York City
- County/Borough: Queens
- Community District: Queens 5
- Founded: 1642

Population (2010)
  - Total: 32,496

Race/Ethnicity
  - White: 61.4%
  - Hispanic: 33.4
  - Asian: 3.1
  - Black: 1.2
  - Other/Multiracial: 0.9
- Time zone: UTC−5 (EST)
  - Summer (DST): UTC−4 (EDT)
- ZIP Code: 11385
- Area codes: 718, 347, 929, and 917

Glendale is a neighborhood in the west-central portion of the New York City borough of Queens. It is bounded by Forest Hills to the east, Ridgewood to the west, Woodhaven to the south, and Middle Village to the north.

Glendale was built on a swampy area previously called Fresh Pond. The neighborhood was later developed into an industrial area, though it is now a more residential neighborhood. Glendale's land area is long on its east-west axis and narrow on its north-south axis. The area is surrounded mainly by cemeteries, although the neighborhood also contains several large parks, including part of Forest Park.

Glendale is located in Queens Community District 5 and its ZIP Code is 11385. It is patrolled by the New York City Police Department's 104th Precinct. Politically, Glendale is represented by the New York City Council's 30th District.

== Boundaries ==
Glendale is bordered to the north by a section of the Montauk Branch of the Long Island Rail Road (LIRR) in the western portion (Lower and Middle Glendale), and by Cooper and Metropolitan Avenues in the eastern portion (Upper Glendale). To the east, the border is the Rockaway Beach Branch of the LIRR, as well as Woodhaven Boulevard. Forest Park, along with the Jackie Robinson Parkway and a number of contiguous cemeteries, creates the southern and western borders; the borough line with Brooklyn runs through the cemeteries on the western part of the southern border. Glendale's borders are completed from the southwest (from Cooper and Wyckoff Avenues) by the Bay Ridge Branch of the LIRR and Fresh Pond Road from Myrtle Avenue to the BMT Myrtle Avenue Line right-of-way.

== History ==
Harry Houdini's grave

The land comprising present-day Glendale was originally named Fresh Pond, a swampy area that was part of a 74,000-acre (30,000 ha) area collectively called Newtown. The town of Newtown had been chartered to the Reverend Francis Doughty by the Dutch West India Company in 1642. In turn, Fresh Pond was originally named for two freshwater ponds that, in the early 1900s, were filled in.

=== 19th century ===
In 1847, New York State's Rural Cemetery Act ended the creation of any new cemeteries in Manhattan. Cemetery owners were encouraged to build in Brooklyn and Queens. Glendale quickly became almost encircled by cemeteries being located in what is called the "Cemetery Belt".

In 1860, developer George C. Schott was given a large amount of land in Fresh Pond as repayment for a debt. Schott renamed Fresh Pond after his native Glendale, Ohio. Nine years later, John C. Schooley, a real estate agent, bought a substantial amount of property and also called it Glendale. Schooley laid out streets and divided his property into 469 lots, measuring 25 by 100 feet (7.6 m × 30.5 m), which he then sold off for $300 each. In 1869, a railroad stop at 73rd Street (then named Wyckoff Avenue) was opened by the South Side Railroad, which was sold in 1874 to the North Side Railroad, which then was merged into the Long Island Rail Road (LIRR) in 1876, becoming part of the Montauk Branch. In 1927, the station burned down and was never replaced.

The area became a thriving German farming community in the 19th century. Between the 1880s and World War I, Glendale also had many sources of entertainment. It had a bowling alley at Myrtle Avenue and 73rd Street; Herman's Saloon; Liberty; Louis Hellen's Saloon and picnic grove at Cooper Avenue and 73rd Street; and a trolleys along Union Turnpike that ran to Schutzen Park. Development began along Myrtle Avenue, Glendale's main thoroughfare, as many family-run stores began opening and steam powered trolleys were introduced on "The Avenue" in 1891. Owing to the English transliteration options from the original German name, Schutzen Park was also previously known as both "Schuetzen Park" and "Scheutzen Park".

=== 20th century ===
After World War I, Glendale's economic base shifted from farming to textiles and breweries. The largest employer was the Atlas Terminal, a vast industrial park, consisting of 16 factories. Because of the skilled work force living in the area and the many small machine shops located here, Glendale played a big part in the war effort during World War II and, especially in the Manhattan Project, which produced the first atomic bombs. During World War II, most of the aircraft and military equipment made on Long Island was shipped by rail through this area. Meanwhile, new housing was being developed in the area as well; by 1937, the neighborhood's sole extant farm was being developed as housing.

Between 1933 and 1936, the Interborough (now Jackie Robinson) Parkway, designed by New York City parks commissioner Robert Moses, was built through Glendale, displacing hundreds of bodies buried in the Cypress Hills Cemetery. The parkway, strongly opposed by residents of neighborhoods surrounding Forest Park, displaced Riebling's Greater New York Park and Casino, and necessitated the redesign of the Forest Park Golf Course.

Originally, Ridgewood and Glendale (although in Queens) shared ZIP Code 11237 with Bushwick, Brooklyn. However, following the 1977 blackout, the communities of Ridgewood and Glendale expressed a desire to disassociate themselves from Bushwick. Residents voted on a proposal to create a new ZIP Code, and a majority of votes were cast in favor of the proposal. The communities were given the ZIP Code 11385 in 1980.

By the 1980s, Glendale was known as one of the quieter neighborhoods in New York City. Despite disrepair and crime being prevalent in other sections of the city, The New York Times reported in 1986 that "the graffiti, litter and potholes familiar to most New Yorkers are all but unknown in Glendale's three square miles."

The area was mostly middle-class with well-maintained housing stock and had one of the lowest crime rates in New York City, but lacked a major community hub. In 1998, service to the Glendale LIRR station was discontinued. The station suffered from low ridership and inability to operate with the C3 bi-level coaches, which can stop only at stations with high level platforms. This station had only two riders daily at the time of its closure.

=== 21st century ===
At the beginning of the 21st century, some of Glendale's industrial buildings were redeveloped. Atlas Terminal was demolished in 2004 and replaced by a shopping center called The Shops at Atlas Park, which opened in April 2006. In other parts of Glendale, companies such as Trader Joe's and Chili's took over former industrial buildings.

In 2012, all passenger service on the Lower Montauk Branch was discontinued. However, freight trains still operate, although in recent years, controversy over trains transporting radioactive waste through the community has arisen. All goods shipped by rail with a destination on Long Island (Brooklyn, Queens and Nassau and Suffolk counties), must come through the Fresh Pond/Fremont Yards, located in Glendale, which is the crossroads of the LIRR Montauk Branch, the Bay Ridge Branch (which serves the docks and float barges in Sunset Park, Brooklyn), the Bushwick Branch and the New York Connecting Railroad, which connects them all to the rest of the country by traveling north to Selkirk, New York, and across the Hudson River to New Jersey and west. The biggest product currently shipped from here is municipal waste and construction and demolition debris.

== Demographics ==
Based on data from the 2010 United States census, the population of Glendale was 32,496.

The racial makeup of the neighborhood was 61.4% (19,793) White, 1.2% (384) African American, 0.2% (67) Native American, 3.1% (1,004) Asian, 1.0% (5) Pacific Islander, 0.2% (78) from other races, and 0.9% (310) from two or more races. Hispanic or Latino of any race were 33.4% (10,855) of the population.

The entirety of Community Board 5, which comprises Maspeth, Ridgewood, Middle Village, and Glendale, had 166,924 inhabitants as of NYC Health's 2018 Community Health Profile, with an average life expectancy of 81.4 years. This is about equal to the median life expectancy of 81.2 for all New York City neighborhoods. Most inhabitants are youth and middle-aged adults: 22% are between the ages of 0–17, 31% between 25–44, and 26% between 45–64. The ratio of college-aged and elderly residents was lower, at 8% and 13% respectively.

As of 2017, the median household income in Community Board 5 was $71,234. In 2018, an estimated 19% of Glendale, Ridgewood, and Maspeth residents lived in poverty, compared to 19% in all of Queens and 20% in all of New York City. One in seventeen residents (6%) were unemployed, compared to 8% in Queens and 9% in New York City. Rent burden, or the percentage of residents who have difficulty paying their rent, is 46% in Glendale, Ridgewood, and Maspeth, lower than the boroughwide and citywide rates of 53% and 51% respectively. Based on this calculation, as of 2018, Maspeth, Ridgewood, Middle Village, and Glendale are considered to be high-income relative to the rest of the city and not gentrifying.

== Neighborhood ==
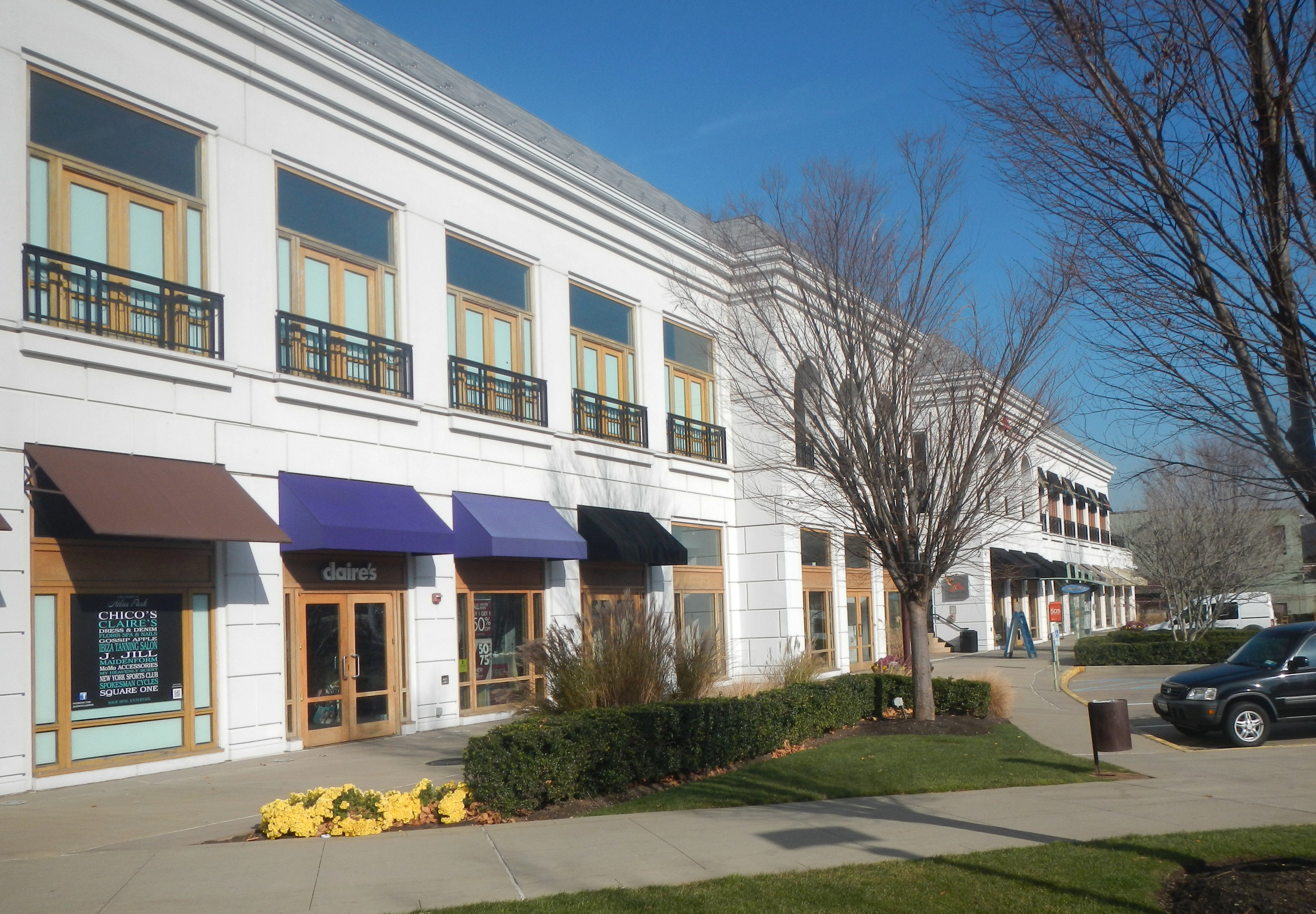
The Shops at Atlas Park

Glendale, a part of Queens Community Board 5, is a working to middle class neighborhood surrounded by Forest Hills, Ridgewood, Woodhaven, Middle Village, and Kew Gardens. The neighborhood is somewhat suburban in feel although it still is served by the subway and buses. Its-tree lined streets contain many different architectural styles.

Compared to most other Queens neighborhoods, Glendale is long and narrow since it is essentially sandwiched by cemeteries and Forest Park. As a result, it is considered to have three areas: from east to west, they are Upper Glendale, Middle Glendale, and Lower Glendale. Each area has its own unique attributes.

The easternmost portion near the Shops at Atlas Park is known as Upper Glendale and in general has more expensive homes and slightly higher income levels than the rest of Glendale. Upper Glendale has detached and semi-attached single- and two-family houses of above-average size, semi-detached wood frame houses and a number of brick townhomes with often meticulously maintained grassy front yards. Many of these were built after the 1920s.

The middle portion of Glendale that straddles Myrtle Avenue is the primary business district and has a mix of semi-detached, wood frame, single-family houses as well as a number of multi-family dwellings and townhomes. The housing stock here often dates back to the late 1800s/early 1900s and as a result, a significant number of them are made of yellow Kreischer brick much like similar, landmarked buildings in neighboring Ridgewood.

The western or "lower" part of Glendale has three national historic districts and includes the neighborhoods of Evergreen (near and around Evergreen Park) and Liberty Park, which is bordered by Cypress Hills Street, Cooper Avenue, 61st Street and cemeteries to the south. Like most of Glendale, Evergreen is relatively flat. It has mostly late 1800s/early 1900s semi-detached, multi-family, wood frame houses and a significant number of townhomes made of yellow Kreischer brick again similar to landmarked buildings in neighboring Ridgewood. In contrast, Liberty Park, developed in the 1920s, is built on the north slope of a hill and is dominated by detached single-family, wood-frame houses with private driveways and backyards.

=== Architecture ===
In the lower portion of Glendale, three national historic districts were listed on the National Register of Historic Places in 1983. These are the 75th Avenue-61st Street Historic District, Central Avenue Historic District and Cooper Avenue Row Historic District. Each of these districts contains significant numbers of early 20th century buildings made with the distinctive yellow Kreischer brick.

=== Cemetery Belt ===
Within Glendale's Cemetery Belt, there are numerous cemeteries that surround Glendale. The New York Times wrote in 1986 that "there are more tombstones in Glendale [...] than living residents," with 40,000 graves at the time. In 2011, the Times described the cemeteries as "a natural fence" that helped retain Glendale's middle-class reputation.

The cemeteries include Cypress Hills, Lutheran All Faiths, Salem Fields, Mount Lebanon, Mount Carmel, New Mount Carmel, Beth El (New Union Field), Mount Neboh, and Union Field. Some of these cemeteries are the resting places of many famous people, including Jackie Robinson, Mae West, and Harry Houdini, at whose tomb devotees gather each year on Halloween to see if he can pull off the ultimate escape trick and return from the grave. Cypress Hills Cemetery is the site of the New York City Police "Arlington" and also contains the graves of Confederate soldiers who died in local prisons and hospitals. It also was one of the earliest military cemeteries and its most unusual resident is a circus elephant.

== Police and crime ==
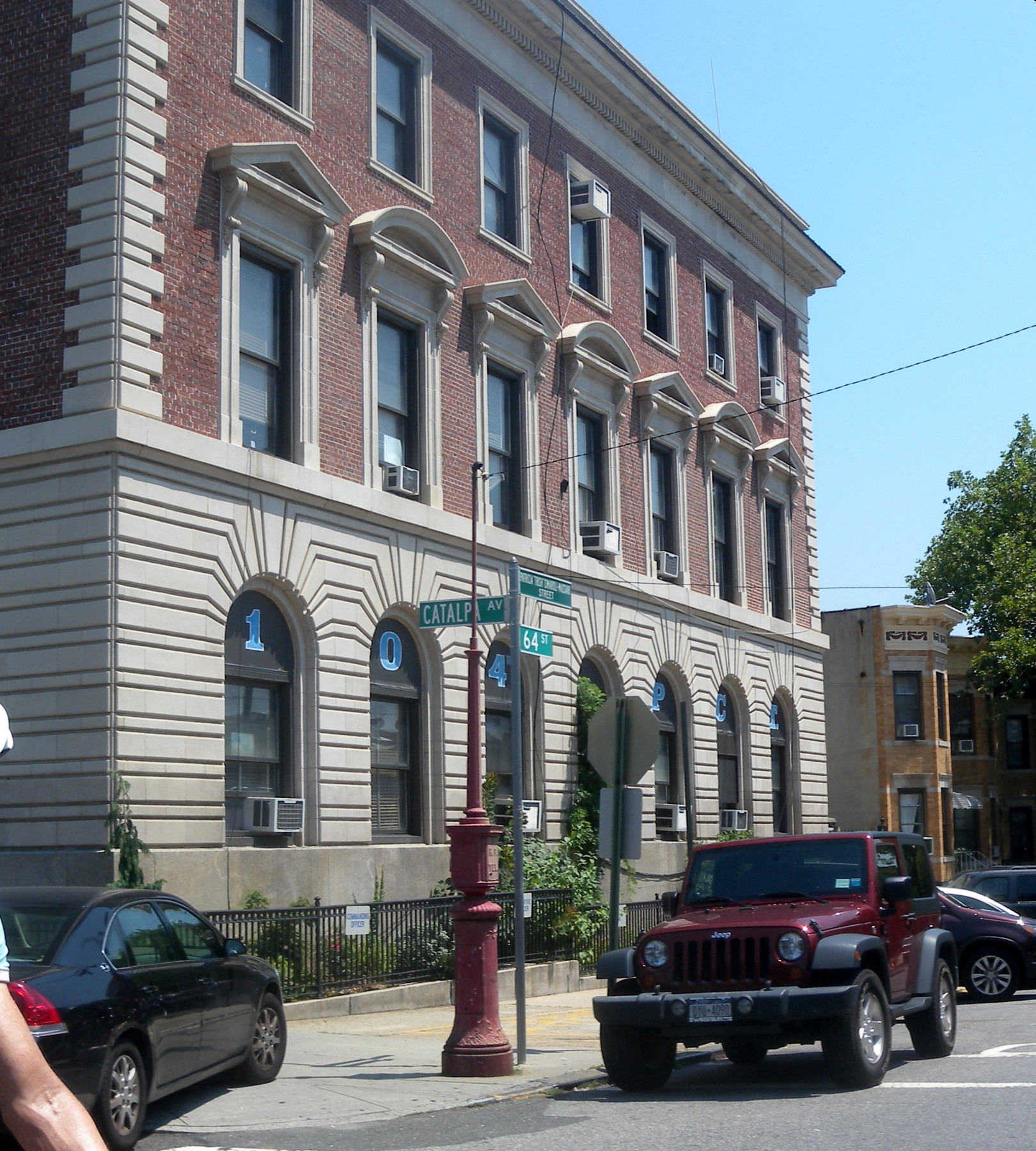
104th Precinct

Maspeth, Ridgewood, Middle Village, and Glendale are patrolled by the 104th Precinct of the NYPD, located at 64-02 Catalpa Avenue. The 104th Precinct ranked 21st safest out of 69 patrol areas for per-capita crime in 2010. However, the precinct covers a large diamond-shaped area, and Maspeth and Middle Village are generally seen as safer than Ridgewood. As of 2018, with a non-fatal assault rate of 19 per 100,000 people, Glendale, Ridgewood, and Maspeth's rate of violent crimes per capita is less than that of the city as a whole. The incarceration rate of 235 per 100,000 people is lower than that of the city as a whole.

The 104th Precinct has a lower crime rate than in the 1990s, with crimes across all categories having decreased by 87.4% between 1990 and 2018. The precinct reported 2 murders, 17 rapes, 140 robberies, 168 felony assaults, 214 burglaries, 531 grand larcenies, and 123 grand larcenies auto in 2018.

== Fire safety ==
Glendale contains a New York City Fire Department (FDNY) fire station, Engine Co. 286/Ladder Co. 135, at 66-44 Myrtle Avenue.

In 1896, Glendale's first fire department, the Ivanhoe Park Hose Company, a volunteer fire company, was established. It was funded by Henry Meyer, a wealthy businessman, who owned a cigar factory, a lucrative holding of stocks, and a sizable amount of land, part of which would become the neighborhood of Liberty Park. The fire department's uniforms, a hose cart and the hose were subsidized by Meyer. He also undertook several construction projects, such as building pumping stations, to ensure water would be available anywhere along the major streets (i.e., Myrtle Avenue and Cypress Hills Street). Later that year, the first company was expanded with a hook and ladder and renamed Ivanhoe Fire Hook and Ladder Company and two months later became Company 10 in the Newtown Fire Department.

== Health ==
As of 2018, preterm births and births to teenage mothers are less common in Glendale, Ridgewood, and Maspeth than in other places citywide. In Glendale, Ridgewood, and Maspeth, there were 70 preterm births per 1,000 live births (compared to 87 per 1,000 citywide), and 17.6 births to teenage mothers per 1,000 live births (compared to 19.3 per 1,000 citywide). Glendale, Ridgewood, and Maspeth have a low population of residents who are uninsured. In 2018, this population of uninsured residents was estimated to be 13%, slightly higher than the citywide rate of 12%.

The concentration of fine particulate matter, the deadliest type of air pollutant, in Glendale, Ridgewood, and Maspeth is 0.008 milligrams per cubic metre (8.0×10^{−9} oz/ft^{3}), more than the city average. Twenty percent of Glendale, Ridgewood, and Maspeth residents are smokers, which is higher than the city average of 14% of residents being smokers. In Glendale, Ridgewood, and Maspeth, 19% of residents are obese, 7% are diabetic, and 20% have high blood pressure—compared to the citywide averages of 22%, 8%, and 23% respectively. In addition, 19% of children are obese, compared to the citywide average of 20%.

Ninety-two percent of residents eat some fruits and vegetables every day, which is higher than the city's average of 87%. In 2018, 78% of residents described their health as "good", "very good", or "excellent", equal to the city's average of 78%. For every supermarket in Glendale, Ridgewood, and Maspeth, there are 5 bodegas.

The nearest major hospital is Elmhurst Hospital Center in Elmhurst.

== Post office and ZIP Code ==
Glendale is covered by ZIP Code 11385. The United States Post Office operates the Glendale Station at 69-36 Myrtle Avenue.

=== ZIP Code changes ===
Since at least 1898, when the boroughs of Brooklyn and Queens were created as part of the City of Greater New York, Glendale and Ridgewood's postal mail had been routed through the main Brooklyn post office in Williamsburg, rather than the main post office in Flushing, because they are located closer to Williamsburg. When ZIP Codes were assigned in 1963, the neighborhoods were assigned Brooklyn ZIP Codes with the 112 prefix, along with all areas whose mail was routed through a Brooklyn post office. This gave Glendale and Ridgewood a Brooklyn mailing address despite actually being located in Queens. The neighborhoods' ZIP Code of 11227 was shared with Bushwick, Brooklyn, as well as with Wyckoff Heights on the border of the two boroughs. After the 1977 New York City blackout, newspapers around the country published UPI and Associated Press' photos of Bushwick residents with stolen items and a police officer beating a suspected looter, and Bushwick became known for riots and looting. Afterward, the communities of Ridgewood and Glendale expressed a desire to disassociate themselves from Bushwick.

Following complaints from residents, Postmaster General William Bolger proposed that the ZIP Codes would be changed if United States Representative Geraldine Ferraro could produce evidence that 70% of residents supported it. After Ferraro's office distributed ballots to residents, 93 percent of the returned ballots voted for the change. The change to ZIP Code 11385 was made effective January 13, 1980.

In 2007, there was a movement by Glendale residents to obtain their own ZIP Code since sharing a zip code with Ridgewood has caused many problems due to auto-fill features programmed into most computer databases. As a result, most Glendale residents receive mail addressed "Ridgewood" and have difficulties when arranging deliveries or hiring plumbers, electricians or contractors. The incorrect, misleading Ridgewood address causes many of them to go to the wrong location, since numbered roads in Queens are often broken into separate segments by barriers like railroad tracks, highways and cemeteries.

In 2012, the quest to obtain a unique ZIP Code for Glendale was again brought to the forefront by Congressman Bob Turner and Assemblyman Mike Miller; the unused 11384 was suggested. This request was again denied by the Postal Service, although a compromise was offered under which the USPS modified its software to include "Glendale" as a preferred community name for the identified area.

As of 2014, this software modification by the USPS has not yet been updated in the City Map web site at NYC.gov, the city's official website, which still displays Queens community names based solely on names associated with ZIP Codes. As a result, addresses several miles away from Ridgewood, such as 80-00 Cooper Avenue (The Shops at Atlas Park at 80th Street), 72-25 Woodhaven Boulevard (a Trader Joe's, Staples, and Michael's location at Metropolitan Avenue) and 75-11 Woodhaven Boulevard (a Home Depot location behind 72-25 Woodhaven Boulevard) are listed by City Map as being in Ridgewood despite being located in Glendale, in Rego Park, or in Forest Hills.

== Parks ==
Myrtle Avenue was greatly enjoyed for its parks, often frequented by picnickers. With the steam trolley running along the Avenue, several investors bought a total of 500 acres (200 ha) of land in the eastern end of Glendale and opened a number of parks and beer gardens. In the 1890s, on the north side of Myrtle Avenue from what is now 83rd Street to Woodhaven Boulevard, Schmidt's Woods, Glendale Schuetzen Park, Greater New York Park and Casino, and Tivoli Park—all picnic parks—opened. On the south side of Myrtle Avenue from 88th Place to Woodhaven Boulevard were El Dorado Park, Emerald Park and Florida Park. These parks drew large crowds, not only from Glendale but from Eastern Brooklyn, where there were no proper parks at the time. One of the sections of Glendale, now known as "Liberty Park", is located on the site of a former beer garden of the same name. Another section of Glendale, adjacent to the LIRR Fresh Pond/Fremont Yards, was named after the Ivanhoe Park beer garden at that location. "Doddies", located at Cooper Avenue and 74th Street, was the last of the beer gardens, surviving into the late 1960s with an outdoor picnic area and the first neighborhood bar to have a television in the late 1940s or early 1950s. Redeemer Lutheran School occupies the site of "Hoffman Hall", a beer garden and dance hall. In the mid-1920s, the parks closed because they were unable to financially weather Prohibition.

From August 9, 1895 until 1898, one hundred and twenty-four parcels were bought for the new 538-acre (218 ha) Forest Park, which is composed of many of these former picnic parks. Since Brooklyn and Queens were incorporated into New York City by the time all of the park's land was procured, the park's name was shortened from the original moniker of "Brooklyn Forest Park". A bandstand built in Forest Park in 1898 preceded a bandshell built in 1920; for almost a century, George Seuffert Sr.—and later, his son, Dr. George F. Seuffert—played free concerts at the bandshell every weekend until the latter died in 1995. The bandshell is now for public use. Forest Park also has a public golf course, as well as horse riding trails (stables are located nearby, off the park grounds). Forest Park Drive, which runs throughout the park, is closed to vehicles from Woodhaven Boulevard to Metropolitan Avenue, making it a popular spot for skaters.

Dry Harbor Playground, at Myrtle Avenue and 80th Street, opened in 1934. It has swings, seesaws, a wavy slide, a flagpole, and a school gym. It was created when Edward Bourcier gave away 17 acres (6.9 ha) of his land as part of Forest Park. The playground also consists of an attached one-story house.

In 1940–1, the property of PS 67, as well as an adjoining lot, became the location of the Glendale Playground at Central Avenue and 70th Street. The playground opened in 1942.

In 1949, a former Minor League Baseball field at 65th Place named Farmers' Oval after the Glendale Farmers Base Ball Club team, which had played at the field for half a century prior, was the site of a groundbreaking for a new park. In 1967, the park was officially renamed the Joseph F. Mafera Park, memorializing the late Queens Borough president. At Mafera Park, roller hockey can be played on the rink there.

On the easternmost edge of Glendale, on the site between the train tracks of the Rockaway Beach and Montauk Branches of the LIRR where an old ice house once stood, is Seither Stadium, the home field of the Ridgewood, Glendale, Middle Village and Maspeth Little League.

South of the Liberty Park section of Glendale (and separated by cemeteries as well as the Jackie Robinson Parkway) is Ridgewood Reservoir, a naturalistic part of Highland Park. The New York City government renovated it in 2013 by adding new period lighting and fences.

== Education ==
Glendale, Ridgewood, and Maspeth generally have a lower rate of college-educated residents than the rest of the city as of 2018. While 33% of residents age 25 and older have a college education or higher, 16% have less than a high school education and 50% are high school graduates or have some college education. By contrast, 39% of Queens residents and 43% of city residents have a college education or higher. The percentage of Glendale, Ridgewood, and Maspeth students excelling in math rose from 36% in 2000 to 67% in 2011, and reading achievement rose from 42% to 49% during the same time period.

Glendale, Ridgewood, and Maspeth's rate of elementary school student absenteeism is less than the rest of New York City. In Glendale, Ridgewood, and Maspeth, 14% of elementary school students missed twenty or more days per school year, lower than the citywide average of 20%. Additionally, 82% of high school students in Glendale, Ridgewood, and Maspeth graduate on time, more than the citywide average of 75%.

=== Schools ===
The Glendale School, fall 2026

Glendale has seven schools: P.S. 68 Elementary, P.S. 91 Elementary, P.S. 113 Elementary, Glendale Intermediate School, Sacred Heart Elementary, Central Queens Academy Charter and Elm Community Charter.

=== Library ===
The Queens Public Library's Glendale branch is located at 78-60 73rd Place. It also has an annex at The Shops at Atlas Park.

== Transportation ==
The following MTA Regional Bus Operations bus routes serve Glendale:

- B13: to DeKalb Avenue (L train) or Gateway Center via 61st and 62nd Streets, Cooper Avenue and Cypress Hills Street
- Q11: to Woodhaven Boulevard (Elmhurst) (M and R trains) or Howard Beach via Woodhaven Boulevard
- Q29: to 82nd Street–Jackson Heights (7 train) via 80th Street
- Q39: to Long Island City via Forest Avenue
- Q47: to East Elmhurst via 80th Street
- Q52 SBS: to Woodhaven Boulevard (Elmhurst) (M and R trains) or Edgemere via Woodhaven Boulevard
- Q53 SBS: to 61st Street–Woodside (7 and <7> trains)/Woodside LIRR or Rockaway Park–Beach 116th Street (A and S trains) via Woodhaven Boulevard
- Q54: to Williamsburg Bridge Plaza Bus Terminal or Jamaica Center–Parsons/Archer (E, J, and Z trains) via Metropolitan Avenue
- Q55: to Myrtle–Wyckoff Avenues (L and M trains) or 121st Street (J and Z trains) via Myrtle Avenue

The Long Island Rail Road had a station at Edsall Avenue and 73rd Street, which opened in 1868 and served the Montauk Branch. It closed on March 16, 1998, due to low usage, with only two passengers a day using the stop. The nearest operating LIRR stations are in Kew Gardens and Forest Hills.

== Notable people ==
Notable current and former residents of Glendale include:

- Richard Arkwright (1732–1792), a pioneer in the spinning industry, which revolutionized the knitwear industry. PS 91 in Glendale is named after him.
- Big Cass (born 1986), professional wrestler formerly with WWE.
- Daniel Daly (1873–1937), the most decorated hero of the United States Marine Corps and Medal of Honor recipient, lived out his final years after World War I in Glendale.
- Harry Houdini (1874–1926), magician, buried in Machpelah Cemetery
- Rafael Ramos (1974–2014), slain NYPD officer, who lived in Glendale before moving to Cypress Hills
- Phil Rizzuto (1917–2007), shortstop who spent his entire 13-year baseball career with the New York Yankees.
- Dan Schneider (born 1965), writer
- Cree Cicchino (born 2002), actress

== In popular culture ==
- In 1971, the sitcom All in the Family premiered. The house seen in the opening of the show is at 89-70 Cooper Avenue.
- A Stranger Is Watching (1982) starring Rip Torn was filmed in a Glendale bar, the Woods Inn, and most of the crew ate lunch with the owner at that time, John Virga.
- Part of an episode of NYPD Blue was also filmed at the Woods Inn in the late 1990s.
- Another of Glendale's bars, The Assembly, figured prominently in the 1996 film Trees Lounge, written, directed, and starring Steve Buscemi. It served as the set for the fictional bar for which the movie is named.
- Cooper's Ale House (now "Yer Man's Irish Pub") is featured in the show The King of Queens as a local bar.

== See also ==
- Irish Americans in New York City
