= Woodside, Queens =

Neighborhood in New York City

Woodside
- Neighborhood of Queens
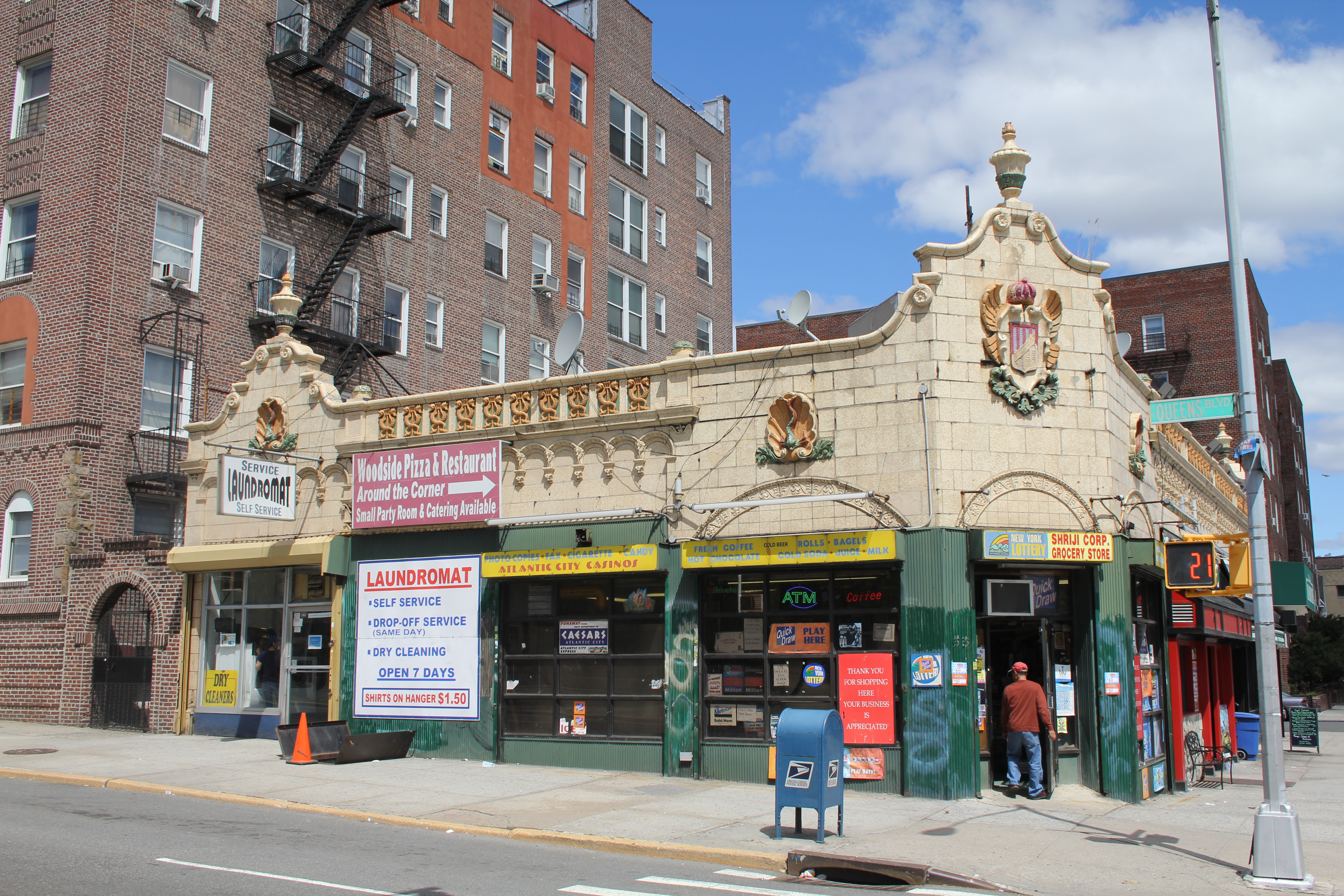
- Former Childs Restaurant branch at 60th Street and Queens Boulevard in Woodside
- Interactive map of Woodside
- Coordinates: 40.745°N 73.905°W
- Country: United States
- State: New York
- City: New York City
- County/Borough: Queens
- Community District: Queens 2

Population (2010 United States census)
  - Total: 45,099

Ethnicity
  - Asian: 39.9%
  - Hispanic: 33.5%
  - White: 22.5%
  - Black: 1.3%
  - Other/Multiracial: 2.8%

Economics
  - Median income: $49,415
- Time zone: UTC−5 (EST)
  - Summer (DST): UTC−4 (EDT)
- ZIP Code: 11377
- Area codes: 718, 347, 929, and 917

Woodside is a neighborhood in the western portion of the borough of Queens in New York City. It is bordered on the south by Maspeth, on the north by Astoria, on the west by Sunnyside, and on the east by Elmhurst, Jackson Heights, and East Elmhurst. Some areas are widely residential and very quiet, while other parts, especially the ones around Roosevelt Avenue, are busier.

In the 19th century the area was part of the Town of Newtown (now Elmhurst). The adjacent area of Winfield was largely incorporated into the post office serving Woodside and as a consequence Winfield lost much of its identity distinct from Woodside. However, with large-scale residential development in the 1860s, Woodside became the largest Irish American community in Queens, being approximately 80% Irish by the 1930s and maintaining a strong Irish culture today. In the early 1990s, many Asian American families include a large Filipino community moved into the area, and as a result the current population is 30% Asian American. South Asians and Latinos have also moved to Woodside in recent years.

Reflecting the neighborhood’s long-standing cultural diversity, the area offers a wide range of international restaurants, cafés, and pubs. It is particularly known for its Thai, Filipino, and South American dining options, which contribute to the neighborhood’s varied and distinctive culinary scene.Woodside is located in Queens Community District 2 and its ZIP Code is 11377. It is patrolled by the New York City Police Department's 108th Precinct. Politically, Woodside is represented by the New York City Council's 22nd and 26th Districts.

== History ==
=== Early years ===
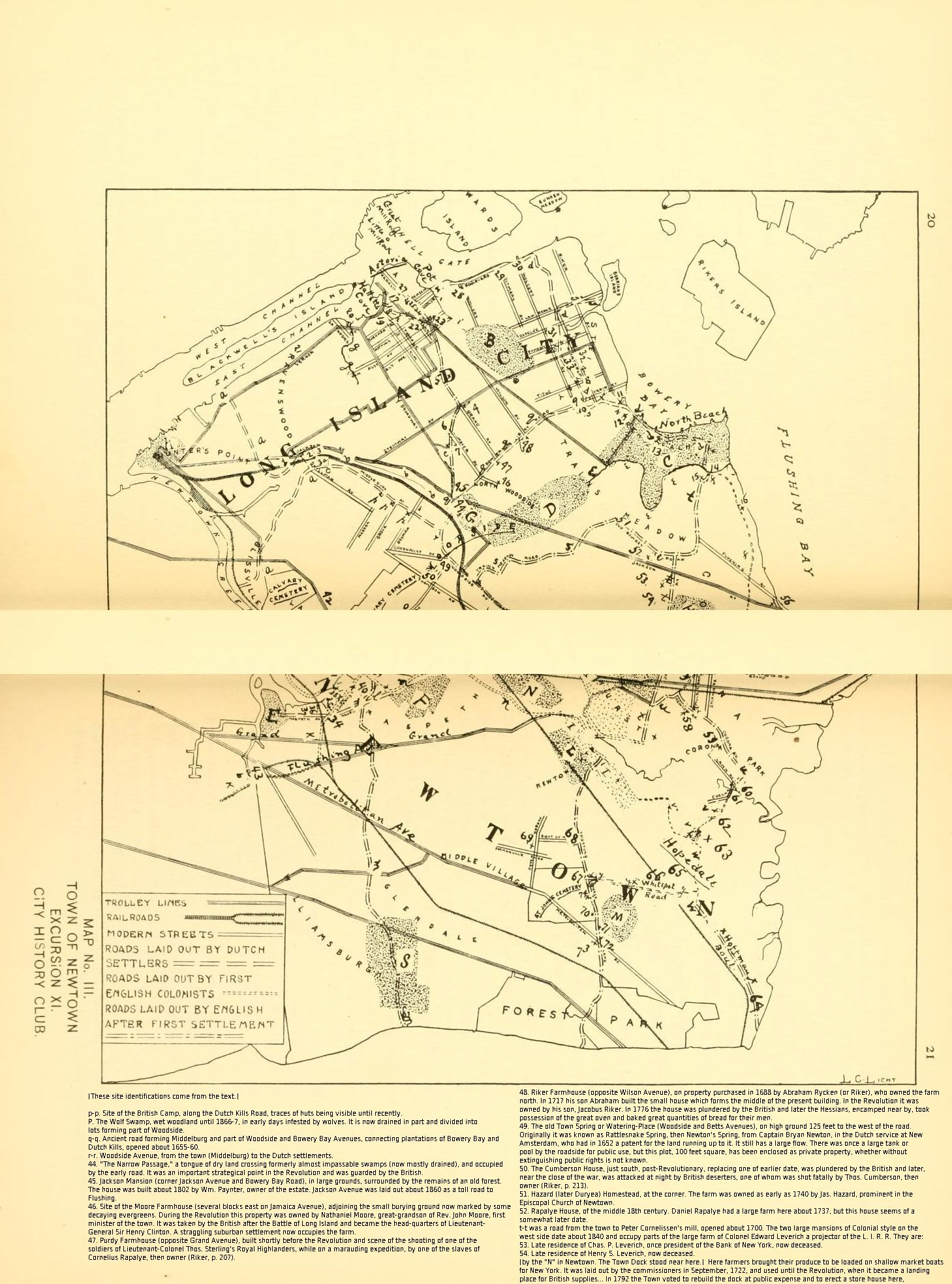
1908 map of the town of Newtown. More details "Map No. III. Town of Newtown. Excursion XI. City History Club.", a map drawn by L.C. Licht. Due to tight binding, this two-page map is missing its middle section. It shows locations in Woodside and surrounding areas of Queens in the mid-17th-mid-19th centuries along with streets, railroads, and trolley lines from the year in which it was made (1908). Modern Woodside is shown as "Woodside" and "North Woodside".

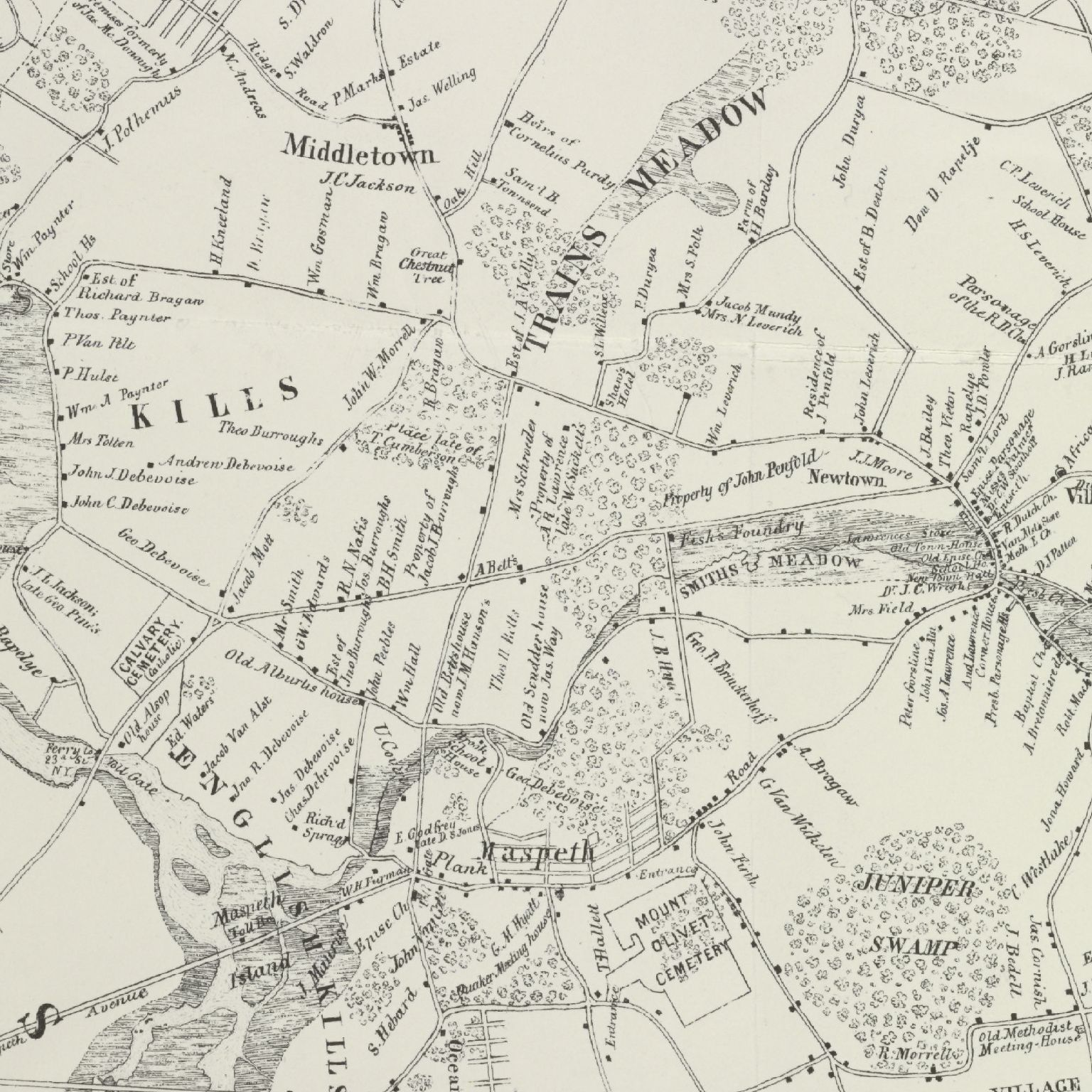
Detail from Map of Newtown, Long Island. Designed to exhibit the localities referred to in the "Annals of Newtown". Compiled by J. Riker Jr. 1852. More details This map shows the area that would become Woodside, bounded in the west by Middletown and Dutch Kills (shown as "Kills" in the detail), in the south by English Kills and Maspeth, and in the east by the Village of Newtown (shown as "Vill" in the detail). Woodside's northern boundary is approximately the top border of the map. The "Great Chestnut Tree" was actually located on the west side of the road where it is shown.

For two centuries following the arrival of settlers from England and the Netherlands, the area where the village of Woodside would be established was sparsely populated. The land was fertile, but also wet. Its Native American inhabitants called it a place of "bad waters", and it was known to early European settlers as a place of "marshes, muddy flats and bogs", where "wooded swamps" and "flaggy pools" were fed by flowing springs." Until drained in the nineteenth century, one of these wet woodlands was called Wolf Swamp after the predators that infested it. This swamp was not the only place where settlers might fear for the safety of their livestock, and even themselves. One of the oldest recorded locations in Woodside was called Rattlesnake Spring on the property of a Captain Bryan Newton. The vicinity came to be called Snake Woods, and one source maintains that "during New York's colonial period, the area was known as 'suicide's paradise,' as it was largely snake-infested swamps and wolf-ridden woodlands."

Woodside was settled by farmers in the early 18th century. In time, inhabitants learned how to farm the land profitably. The marsh grasses proved to be good for grazing and grains, fruits, and vegetables could be grown on the surrounding dry land. By the middle of the 18th century, the area's farmers had drained some of its marshes and cut back some of its woods to expand its arable land and eliminate natural predators. Agricultural produce found markets in New York City, and at the beginning of the 19th century the area came to be "abundantly conspicuous in the wealth of the farmers and in the beauty of the villas." A late 19th-century historian described one of the area's 19th-century farms as a pleasing mix of woodlot, tilled acreage, grazing land, orchard, and pleasure garden. He believed "it would probably have been hard to find anywhere in the vicinity of New York a more picturesque locality." Another observer of this time praised Woodside's "pure atmosphere and delightful scenery."

In the 19th century, the area was part of the Town of Newtown (now Elmhurst). The adjacent area of Winfield was largely incorporated into the post office serving Woodside and as a consequence Winfield lost much of its identity distinct from Woodside.

Some idea of the bucolic nature of the place that would become Woodside can be seen in descriptions of an ancient central landmark, a great chestnut tree. The tree was hundreds of years old when it finally came down in the last decade of the 19th century. It stood on high ground near a junction of three dirt roads and "was of great diameter, some 8 or 10 feet"—perhaps 30 feet in circumference. Its size and central location made it a natural meeting place, its surface one on which to tack public notices, and a strategic point of considerable military significance during the Revolutionary War. A 19th-century antiquarian wrote of the great tree as it stood during the American Revolution and in doing so named the families of the local landowners:

Around the roots of the old tree were the huts and stables of the cavalry: with a number of settler's huts ranged in woods... Great festivities too were constant in the spacious rooms of the old Moore house, during the winter months when the snow was deeper and the frost more cold than now-a-days. To the streaming lights from the ball room, and the lanterns hung on the trees, were wont to assemble the gay sleighing parties from the Sacket [i.e. Sackett], Morrell, Alsop, Leverich and other houses; for the soldiers were all over and had come to Newtown to recruit [i.e. refresh and restore] themselves after the yearly campaigns... Is there any relic more associated with Newtown [i.e. the town in which the village of Woodside would come to be located] than its old chestnut tree?... [Has it] not been for two centuries the "Legal Notice" centre of Newtown, for all vendues, real estate transfers, town meetings, lost "creeturs" and runaway slaves?

Woodside was first developed on a large scale beginning in 1867 by speculative residential neighborhood builder Benjamin W. Hitchcock, who also founded Corona and Ozone Park, and John Andrew Kelly. The neighborhood's location about three miles from Hunter's Point on the Long Island Rail Road line made it an ideal location for a new suburban community. In 1874, the New York Times described Woodside:

At Woodside there are now 100 houses erected, chiefly of the villa-cottage order, and thirty trains daily stop at the station, making it, via the Hunter's Point and James Slip Ferry, less than forty-five minutes from the lower part of the city. Woodside is located on sloping ground, having a good elevation, and pleasing, though not very diversified scenery. There is an abundance of good fruit trees in the vicinity...

==== Agriculture ====
By the middle of the 19th century, drainage and improved agricultural techniques had increased the proportion of Woodside's arable land to some two-thirds of its total. Flowers and dairy products were added to the fruits and vegetables which farmers took to city markets. These landowners also reaped benefits from improved transportation. Mid-century construction of a plank road from Newtown to Williamsburg and a later one from Newtown to Hunters Point made access to East River ferries quicker and easier. In 1860 a corporation presided over by a local resident, John C. Jackson, built a gravel-topped toll road between Flushing and the ferry at Hunters Point. The Plank Road disappeared during construction projects of the later 19th century but Northern Boulevard tracks closely resemble the route of Jackson Avenue.

==== Residential estates ====
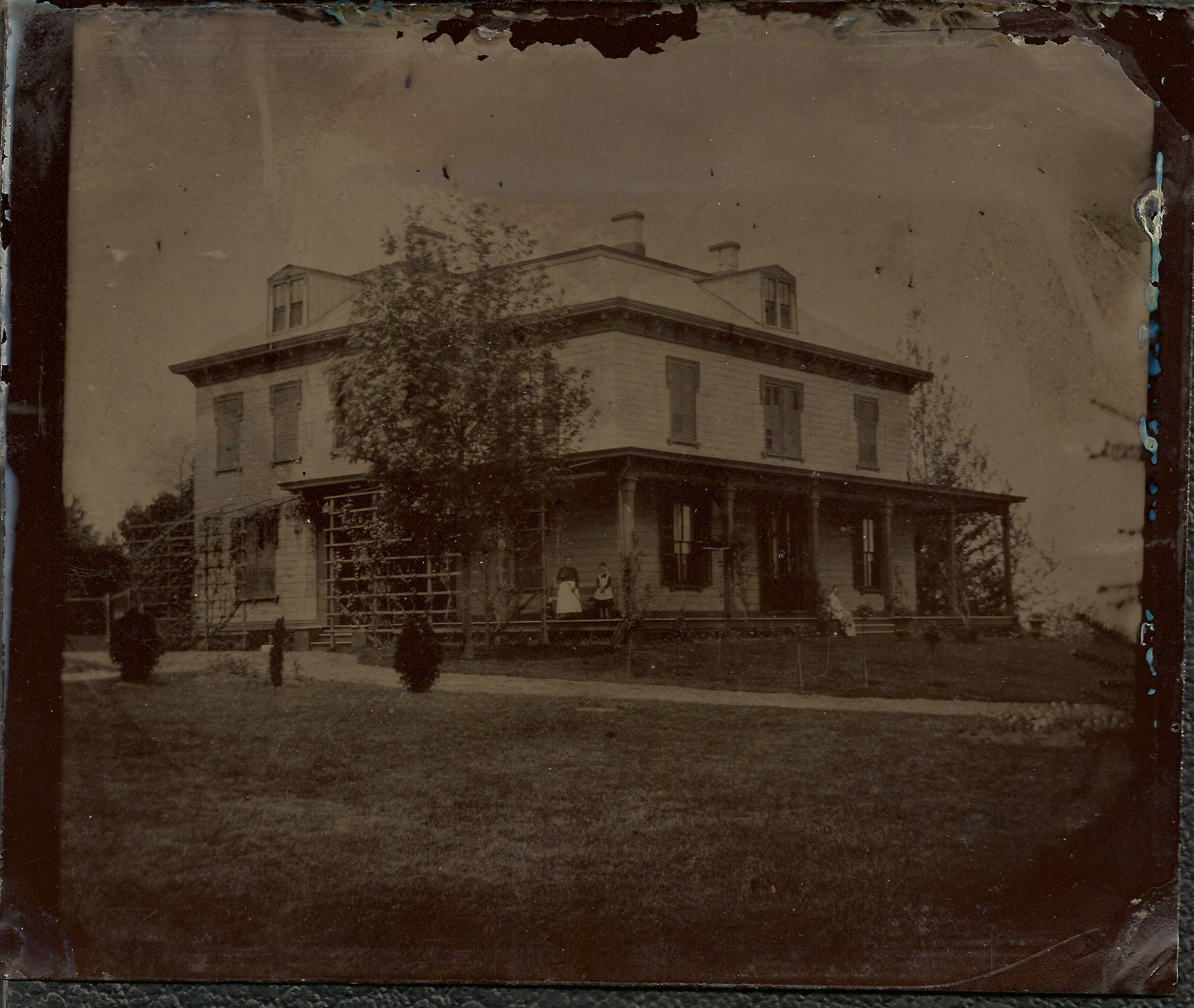
A decayed tintype, showing Hillside Manor in the 1870s. More details The house, sited on high point not far from the Great Chestnut Tree in Woodside, lay on nine acres of land with gardens laid out by Frederick Law Olmsted. Owned by Louis Windmuller, German immigrant, New York merchant, financier, and philanthropist, the estate was one of the last in Woodside to be sold for development. In 1936 the city acquired most of the property for a park to be called Windmuller Park and in 1942 the heirs sold the remainder to a developer for construction of garden apartments.

The improvements in transportation that initially benefited agriculture eventually led to its decline. As it became quicker and more convenient for residents to travel from their homes to other parts of Queens, to Brooklyn, and to Manhattan, the area came to be seen as both desirable and affordable for the construction of housing for city-dwellers and increases in land values enticed farm owners to sell out. John Sackett came from a family of religious dissenters that had settled in Queens late in the 17th century. In 1802 he inherited a farm of 115 acres including much of what is now Woodside, and in 1826 his heirs sold much of the property to John A. Kelly, the son of a German immigrant, and his sister-in-law (also of German descent), Catherine B. (Friedle) Buddy. As other well-to-do merchants had done in other areas of Queens, Kelly and Buddy bought farm property for use as a rural estate where they planned to live in the warmer months of the year. Not long after, a friend of Kelly's, William Schroeder, bought another parcel of the Sackett property for the same purpose. Like Kelly, he came of a family that had emigrated from Germany and, like Kelly, he had achieved wealth as a merchant in Charleston, South Carolina. Unlike Kelly, however, he did not move North, but kept the estate for use during summer vacations.

After Kelly and Schroeder had moved in, two other well-to-do men of German extraction made country retreats for themselves in Woodside. They were Gustav Sussdorf and Louis Windmuller. Like Kelly and Schroeder, Sussdorf was a Charleston merchant. In 1859 he sold his fancy goods business and moved to New York. Not long after, he bought a farm owned by the family of Thomas Cumberson who had died in 1849. It is quite possible that he learned of the place through acquaintance with Schroeder or, more likely, Kelly. Windmuller was of a younger generation than Kelly, Schroeder, and Sussdorf. He emigrated to New York in the aftermath of the Revolutions of 1848. Only 18 years old and penniless, he found success as a commission agent, bringing goods to clients in the U.S. from Germany and other European countries. In 1867 he had accumulated enough savings to buy property adjoining Sussdorf's. The land had formerly belonged to the Morrell family, but had been acquired by a speculator, John A. Mecke, and became available to Windmuller upon Mecke's death and the bankruptcy of his estate. (Note: For succinct accounts about Sussdorf and Windmuller see Woodside: A Historical Perspective 1652-1994 by Catherine Gregory (Woodside on the Move, 1994). A descendant of Windmuller's has written extensively about him and his life in Woodside. See the Louis Windmuller and Woodside labels on the Secondat weblog.)

==== Residential development ====
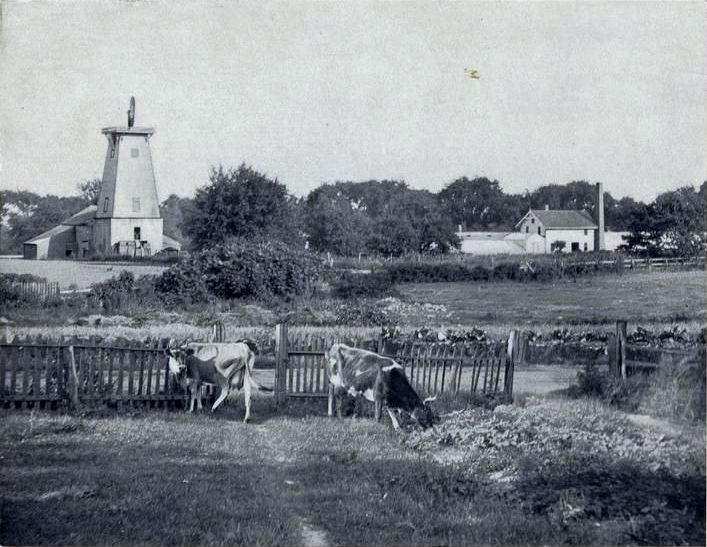
A photograph of the area from a book published in 1899. More details This photograph is entitled "Pastoral scene at Winfield, on the road from Long Island City to Flushing." Founded in 1854, Winfield is a neighborhood in eastern Woodside. The place known as "suicide's paradise" lay on the west side of the neighborhood. The photo shows that Woodside retained some portion of its rural character even at the end of the 19th century.

As farms gave way to country estates, so country estates would, in turn, give way to residential development, as, in the decades after 1850, the land was broken into small lots for construction of single-family houses. As before, this new shift was brought about largely by improvement in transportation resources. In 1854, the first steam-powered passenger rail service came to the area. In that year a passenger depot of the Flushing Railroad from Long Island City to Flushing opened for operation near the southern boundary of what would become the village of Woodside. The line gave access to New York City via the Hunters Point Ferry and to Brooklyn via horse-drawn omnibus. In 1861 a second line opened running directly through what would shortly become the village of Woodside. This was a segment of the Long Island Rail Road which operated between Hunters Point and Jamaica, replacing an earlier segment which passed through Brooklyn to the ferry dock in Williamsburg. In 1869, another line, the Flushing and North Side Railroad, traversed the same path through Woodside. And soon after, in 1874, a short spur, the Flushing and Woodside Railroad opened its station in the village.

The construction of this rail service led directly to the division of property near train stations into small lots for construction of houses for working-class families. The area that would become Woodside was not the first community to grow out of Queens farmland. Before the end of the 1850s Woodhaven, Astoria, Maspeth, Corona, Hunters Point, and Winfield all attracted land speculators. Woodside's developers were, however, among the first to divide properties into lots for construction of small homes for working-class families. In doing so they were the first to use a set of new sales techniques to lure buyers. And they were the first to apply a name to a locale which emphasized its real or supposed virtues. A late 19th century author said "Woodside" was an appropriate name for the community these land speculators created. He maintained that others, created later, were "without the slightest significance, historic or otherwise, and of the kind apparently chosen by boarding schoolgirls to roll romantically from the tongue.". These included Ozone Park, Corona, Winfield, Glendale, Laurel Hill, Elmhurst, and Linden Hill.

The real estate promoters who created Woodside were mostly of German extraction. Members of the Kelly family were first, followed by Alpheus P. Riker, Henry G. Schmidt, John A. Mecke, and Emil Cuntz. The Kelly family developed the property where they resided while the others bought land specifically to divide it into building lots. Riker came from a German family that had settled in Queens while it was still part of New Netherland.

==== Benjamin W. Hitchcock ====
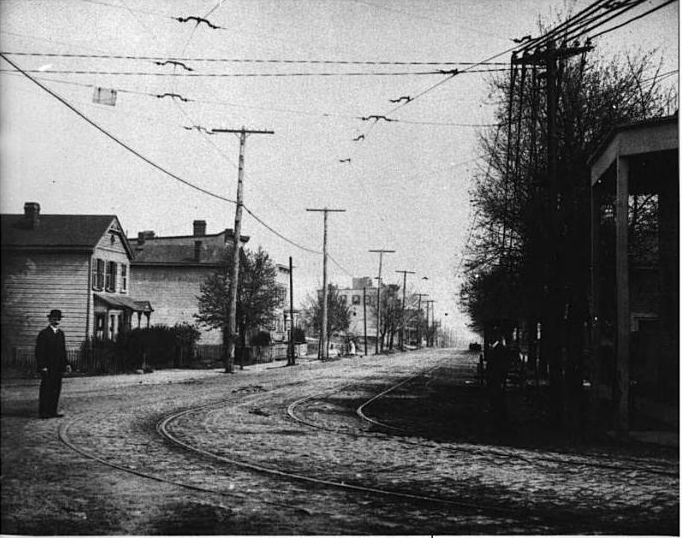
A 1905 postcard photo showing the abrupt turn in the trolley line in Woodside at Woodside and Kelly Avenues. The photographer is standing on Woodside, looking north on Kelly. The house at left is a typical Hitchcock four-room dwelling.

The Kelly family was linked to A. P. Riker's by marriage. Riker, a customs officer, was John A. Kelly's son-in-law. Members of the Kelly family were publishers, and it may not be a coincidence that the agent with whom the Kellys contracted for development of Woodside farmland was a publisher of sheet music, periodicals, and "subscription books" named Benjamin W. Hitchcock. Hitchcock had a flair for publicity and innovative sales techniques. Once the area had been surveyed and 972 plots laid out, he organized excursions from the city, hired brass bands to play, and gave prospects free lunch. The first sales event took place on February 18, 1869. Hitchcock priced empty lots at $300. Employing an innovative sales technique, he sold them on the installment plan. Purchasers made a down payment and owed $10 a month until the note was paid off. He took a 25% commission on each sale. To entice purchasers he sold lottery tickets with first option on choice lots as one set of prizes. Other prizes included option to purchase one of five houses already built on the property. It may have been he or perhaps Kelly who gave the name "Woodside" to the area. A member of the Kelly family, John A. F. Kelly, had used it in occasional pieces he had written for a local newspaper during the 1850s and 1860s. In 1899 one of the original purchasers told a reporter than he had bought a lot with a tiny house on it, only 20' wide by 16' deep. The price was $480, and he paid $125 down and $10 a month until he'd paid off the note.

Hitchcock had an instinct for spectacle akin to P.T. Barnum's. After his success with Woodside he undertook similar real estate promotions in other parts of Queens including hamlets that he dubbed Corona and Ozone Park. When the economy soured and that business declined, he ran a theater, got involved in machine politics, and sponsored some beauty contests including one, the "Congress of Beauty and Culture", which was censured for its overall sleaze and the swindling of its participants.

While the other major landowners of Woodside used agents to develop their holdings, A. P. Riker set up a real estate office in the center of the village from which he managed his own property and handled real estate transactions for others. He was also a partner in local businesses: a grocery store in 1876 and, in 1878, a fruit and vegetable canning business which employed 100 workers.

The developers who followed Hitchcock's lead in Woodside were less flamboyant though similarly successful. In 1863 John Mecke bought farmland from a family, the Moores, who had lived for more than a century and a half on what would become the northern part of what would become Woodside. He intended to subdivide, but became insolvent and, in 1867, died. His heirs sold the property to two carpenters, Henry G. Schmidt and Emil Cuntz, who, in 1871, deeded their property to an organization known as the Bricklayers' Cooperative Building Association. This organization seems not to have been what its name suggests since it was a New York corporation headed by Charles Merweg who gave his occupation as "speculator in real estate". In any event, the Association erected a housing development in north Woodside which it called Charlotteville. The name was later given the more common spelling of Charlottesville. In 1886 another speculator, Effingham H. Nichols, divided property in the eastern part of the village and called it Woodside Heights. Other 19th-century developers included Charles F. Ehrhardt who sold lots in the northern part of the village and the Metropolitan Life Insurance Company which converted two properties on the west side into salable lots.

These and other real estate developers profited from their sale of lots to home buyers, but the growth of Woodside's housing market was hardly a smooth upward trajectory and, some 40 years after Hitchcock's first lottery, the village was far from completely saturated with homes. A minutely detailed property atlas from 1909 shows buildings on considerably less than half of the village's surveyed lots. In fact, although affordable by standards of the time, Woodside's small single family houses on their small lots were too expensive for growing numbers of laborers who crowded the tenement apartments of Manhattan and nearby Brooklyn. In the years before the Panic of 1907 and again after its close, the wage-earners in many of these low-income families, having been able to improve their skills and obtain higher-paying jobs, began pressing for construction of housing that was better than the tenements but still within their means. Although real estate developers had previously thought Woodside to be too remote and rural in character for marketing of low cost rental units, some changed circumstances convinced them to meet this need by putting up higher-density apartment buildings in the village.

==== Other factors ====
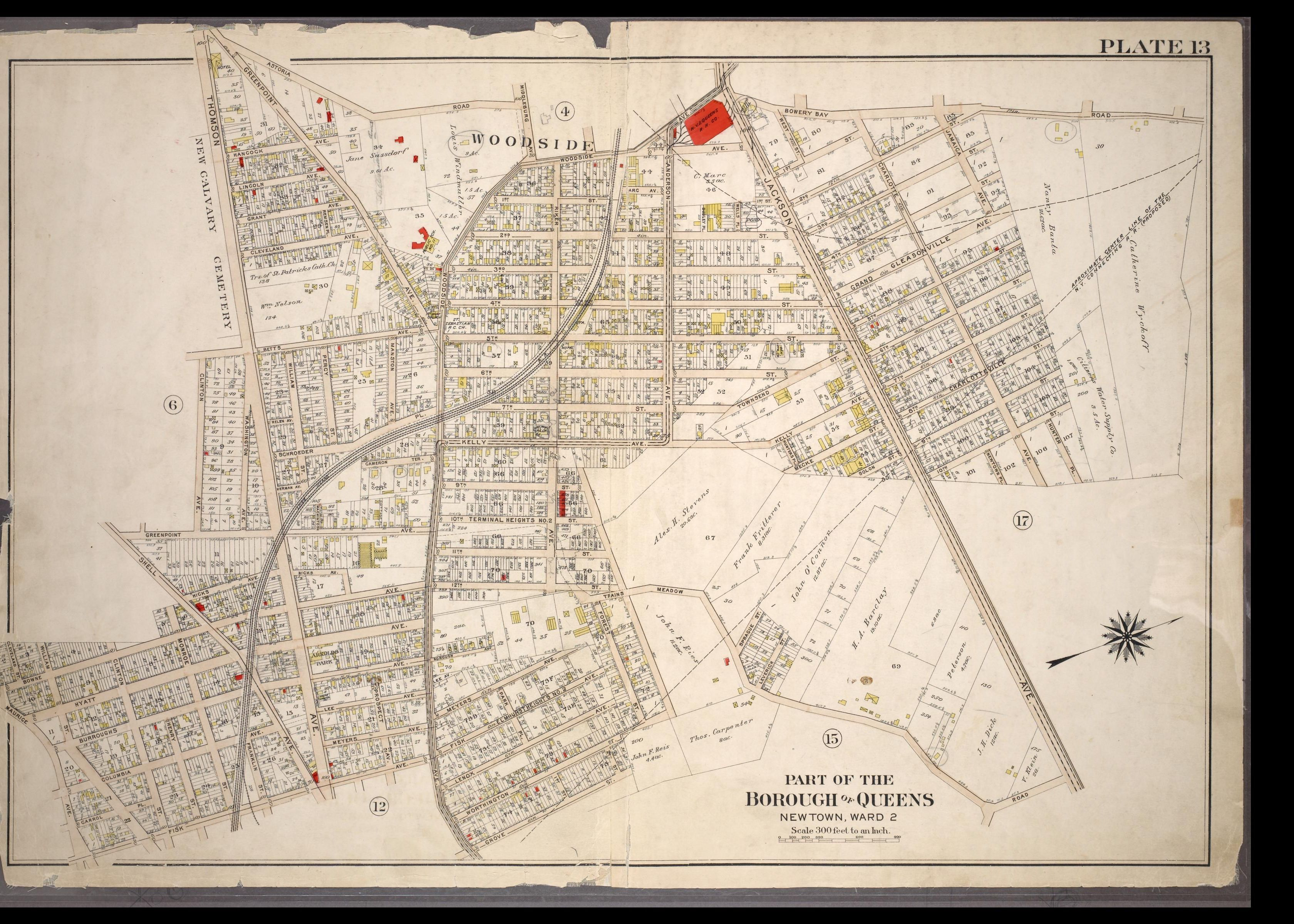
This sheet from a 1909 atlas of Queens was used for fire insurance purposes. More details This map shows streets, lots, and structures within Ward 2, encompassing the village of Woodside. As the key (shown here) indicates, it also gives elevation above high water, location of hydrants, rail and trolley lines, width of streets, and other data.

Chief among these circumstances were continued improvements to the public transportation network. This network continued to expand and Woodside evolved as a hub for railroad (the Long Island Rail Road's Main Line electrified in 1908), elevated rapid transit (the joint IRT/BRT Corona and Woodside Line, 1917), and electrified trolleys (Newtown Railway Company, 1895, and New York and Queens County Line, 1896). With the incorporation of Queens into New York City in 1898 and subsequent passage of legislation mandating a five-cent citywide transit fare in 1904, Woodside residents had both abundant and inexpensive options for rapid public transportation. In fact the real cost of the five-cent fare declined dramatically during the inflation years of World War I and the 1920s, and it remained in place, despite further inflation, until 1948. The construction of bridge and tunnel connections to Manhattan—the Queensboro Bridge in 1909 and the Steinway Tunnel in 1915—enabled the working members of a tenement-dwelling immigrant family to rent a garden apartment in Woodside while having jobs in the central city. The commute was cheap and short, and during rush hours, the five-cent trip took as little as eight minutes to Times Square. Although other areas of Queens benefited from the expansion of cheap transit, Woodside was, back then, the only village in Queens with both railroad and rapid transit stations in addition to trolley lines.

A second circumstance aiding the influx of upwardly-mobile low-income residents was a dramatic increase in local employment prospects. Although cheap, fast, and convenient transit made it possible for workers from Queens to have other-borough jobs, intra-borough employment opportunities were increasingly a realistic option. The waterside regions of Queens had long had substantial industries and businesses that benefited from access to water-borne transport. These commercial establishments multiplied as rail transportation became increasingly available and, in a virtuous growth cycle, as more prospective employees moved into the borough. In the late 19th and early 20th centuries, Woodside residents could find employment to the east in Brooklyn, to the north in College Point, and, especially, to the west. Hunters Point, Sunnyside, and other west-Queens communities possessed foundries, rail yards, chemical works, and numerous factories, including the famous Steinway Piano factory. When, in 1870, these communities formed themselves into Long Island City opportunities for employment grew rapidly, so much so that by the turn of the 20th century, the city could boast that it had the highest concentration of industry in all the United States. There were jobs within Woodside as well. The village had long had the city's largest cemetery, Calvary, as a stimulus to local business. It also possessed a brewery, a major florist, and many local retail establishments. In 1875, the Bulova Watch Company established its headquarters there.

Along with good transportation and access to jobs, Woodside possessed many other local amenities. It was an attractive place with plentiful open spaces, many trees and wooded areas, healthful air, and an overall pleasant ambiance; one news article in 1926 described this as "sylvan beauty", As it had in the other villages, the creation of the Borough of Queens in 1898 brought improvements in local government and increased spending on police, roads, schools, and public spaces, to Woodside. However, Woodside had provided fire protection, sewers, and street lights earlier on, and its transit facilities gave way to a wide variety of retail options. One newspaper article published in 1926 singled out its school, P.S. 11, as "one of the leading public schools in Queens."

As in nearby communities of the time, religious observance played an important role in the lives of Woodside residents, and its churches both reflected this importance and signaled welcome to prospective newcomers. Riker's 1852 map of Newtown shows an Episcopal, Methodist Episcopal, and Presbyterian church in Newtown Village or Winfield. In 1854 St. Mary's Winfield, today's Blessed Virgin Mary Help of Christians, became the first Catholic parish. Much of its congregation and all its early pastors were of German nationality.

The first church in Woodside proper, St. Paul's Protestant Episcopal, showed the dominant faith of the area's oldest and most prominent residents. It was established in 1874 by the families of landowners who had farmed there from its earliest settlement as well as by the estate-owning Germanic families that had moved in during the middle decades of the 19th century, including the longstanding Rapelye, Hicks, and Riker families and the newly arrived Sussdorf, Windmuller, and Kelly families. Two years later, residents from among the still newer owners of small houses set up a Baptist church. St. Paul's originally had a small congregation of only 50, with twice that in 1900; the Baptist church had about the same. St. Sebastian, this section's first Roman Catholic church, served a considerably larger population upon its 1896 foundation. The number of church members, originally 300, quickly grew and was reported to be 1,000 in 1902.

In addition to its other advantages, prospective home buyers were enticed by Woodside's places of entertainment. One of its first businesses was a brewery, which had long possessed rooms where men could gather and drink. In the second half of the 19th century it became renowned for its beer gardens and dance halls. One early resident, Julius Adams, bought a tiny house on one of Hitchcock's small lots. At first he earned his living as a shoemaker, and, succeeding in that business, expanded into others. In 1881 he built Sanger Hall—a German-style beer hall, a dance hall, and performance space for German singing societies and theatrical entertainments—and as the Hall thrived, he added dining rooms and even a bowling alley. In 1889, another resident built Heimann's Hall, a beer garden, dancing pavilion, and dining hall. Early in the 20th century a movie theater joined the options for local leisure-time activity.

=== 20th century ===
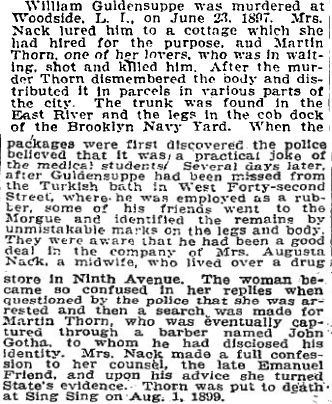
Extract from a news article about an 1897 murder in Woodside. More details This extract from a news article summarizes a sensational murder committed in a rented Woodside cottage on June 23, 1897. The victim, his murderer, and the murderer's accomplice were all German, but none were Woodside residents. The case is considered a landmark not in American jurisprudence but in the history of yellow journalism.

As the 19th century gave way to the 20th, Woodside's plentiful advantages convinced real estate developers to invest substantially in high-occupancy housing and duplex homes to complement the single-family units which had dominated the area. Three representative examples are Woodside Apartments built in 1913, the Metropolitan Life Insurance Company's project of 1922, and the projects of the Woodside Development Corporation in 1923. Located near the rail and rapid transit stations, the Woodside Apartments was a row of four-story, semi-detached buildings. There were four apartments on a floor, most of them having four rooms. Rents initially ranged from $18 to $20 a month. Located just as close to the trains, but on the other side of the village, the Metropolitan Life apartment project was more ambitious. Consisting of ten five-story buildings, the project had space for four hundred families. The Woodside Development Corporation built four-story apartments with stores on the ground floor and both two- and one-family houses on two large plots of land near the center of the village. When a citywide aerial survey was taken in 1924, Woodside was shown to have quite a few other multifamily apartment buildings and duplexes along with its many small single-family homes.

During the 1930s and into the post-war era, Woodside residential development continued to grow, although more slowly than in the boom years following World War I. Empty lots continued to be filled with one- and two-family houses, compact apartment buildings continued to be constructed, and larger, elevator-style high-rises were put up. In 1936, a last large tract of undeveloped land was made available for construction of garden apartments when a portion of the 10-acre Windmuller Estate was sold to developers.

A community profile, published in 1943, characterized Woodside (along with Winfield, its neighbor to the south) as "a district of small homes and middle incomes." The area still had few apartment buildings and very little industry. Although the rapid population growth of the 1920s had fallen off in the 1930s, the authors of the profile expected improved transit (the IND Queens Boulevard Line which opened in 1933) and a new shopping center to draw larger numbers of new residents. The number of single-family houses is given as 2,159, double-family houses as 1,711, and larger residential buildings as 868.

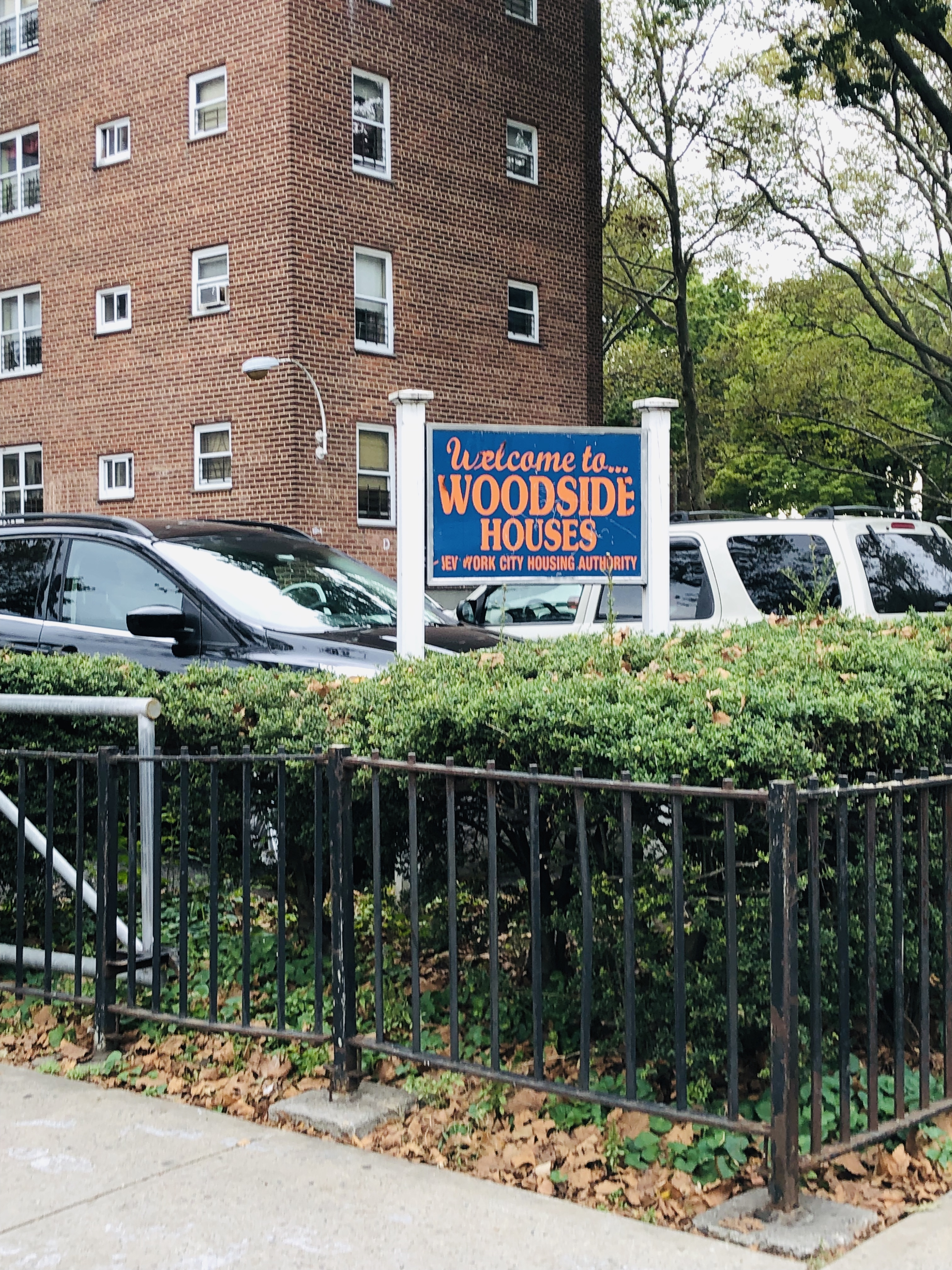
Woodside Houses

In 1949, construction was completed on the Woodside Houses, a public housing complex built and operated by the New York City Housing Authority. The complex consists of 20 six-story buildings with 1,358 apartments. It is located in western Woodside, bordering Astoria, between 49th and 51st Streets, 31st Avenue and Newtown Road.

=== 21st century ===
At the turn of the 21st century, Woodside was finally seen to be built up. The neighborhood nonetheless continued to be seen as an attractive place to live—characterized by "wide avenues, leafy streets and a mix of private homes, small apartment buildings and the occasional towering co-op." The population was about 1,800 in 1880; 3,900 in 1900; 15,000 in 1920; and 41,000 in 1930. By 1963 it had grown to about 55,600, and by 2000, the population had risen to 90,000. In 2008 the chairman of the local Community Board said that large apartment buildings were replacing smaller ones and single-family homes were being converted into multifamily rental properties. At the same time, real estate brokers told a news reporter that interest remained strong among families looking for affordable housing near Manhattan.

== Demographics ==
Based on data from the 2010 United States census, the population of Woodside was 45,099, an increase of 1,253 (2.9%) from the 43,846 counted in 2000. Covering an area of 649.22 acres (262.73 ha), the neighborhood had a population density of 69.5 inhabitants per acre (44,500/sq mi; 17,200/km^{2}).

The racial makeup of the neighborhood was 22.5% (10,140) White, 1.3% (592) African American, 0.2% (76) Native American, 39.9% (17,990) Asian, 0.0% (5) Pacific Islander, 0.5% (221) from other races, and 2.2% (975) from two or more races. Hispanic or Latino of any race were 33.5% (15,100) of the population.

The entirety of Community Board 2, which comprises Woodside and Sunnyside, had 135,972 inhabitants as of NYC Health's 2018 Community Health Profile, with an average life expectancy of 85.4 years. This is higher than the median life expectancy of 81.2 for all New York City neighborhoods. Most inhabitants are middle-aged adults and youth: 17% are between the ages of 0–17, 39% between 25 and 44, and 24% between 45 and 64. The ratio of college-aged and elderly residents was lower, at 8% and 12% respectively.

As of 2017, the median household income in Community Board 2 was $67,359. In 2018, an estimated 20% of Woodside and Sunnyside residents lived in poverty, compared to 19% in all of Queens and 20% in all of New York City. One in twenty residents (5%) were unemployed, compared to 8% in Queens and 9% in New York City. Rent burden, or the percentage of residents who have difficulty paying their rent, is 51% in Woodside and Sunnyside, about equal to the boroughwide and citywide rates of 53% and 51% respectively. Based on this calculation, as of 2018, Woodside and Sunnyside is considered to be high-income relative to the rest of the city and not gentrifying.

As according to the 2020 census data from New York City Department of City Planning, there were between 20,000 and 29,999 residents of Asian descent, 10,000 to 19,999 Hispanic residents, 5,000 to 9,999 White residents, and less than 5000 Black residents.

== Culture ==
=== Background ===
The character of Woodside's population, in terms of national origin, has changed radically over time. Its first inhabitants were Native Americans, probably of the Mespeatches, who gave their name to the town of Maspeth. The first European landowners were mainly Dutch and English and their laborers mainly British, African (slaves), and American Indian. During the nineteenth century, Germans largely took over from these first settlers. In addition to the major Germanic landowners already mentioned (the Kellys—whose name was originally Kölle—Riker, Schroeder, Schmidt, Sussdorf, and Windmuller), the first purchasers of Hitchcock's little plots were largely of German extraction. They included men with names like Eberhardt, Groeber, and Schlepergrel. Beginning at the close of the 19th century and through most of the 20th, growing numbers of Irish residents arrived and Woodside eventually became Irish enough to earn the nickname "Irishtown".

A major turning point in the transition from German to Irish occurred in 1901 when the Greater New York Irish Athletic Association formally opened a large athletic complex called Celtic Park on the border between Woodside and Laurel Hill, its neighbor to the south. A second turning point was the death of Louis Windmuller, the last of the German estate owners. Prominent in local as well as city and national affairs, he was called the "grand old man" or "patriarch" of Woodside. Although the estate did not go out of his heirs' hands until the close of the Depression and beginning of World War II, his passing nonetheless helps mark Woodside's transition from country village to suburban bedroom community. With large-scale residential development in the 1860s, Woodside became the largest Irish American community in Queens. In the early 1930s, the area was approximately 80% Irish. A subsequent influx of Irish occurred during the 1980s and into the early 1990s when many Irish immigrated to New York due to poor economic conditions in Ireland. Many of these "new Irish" settled in Woodside, where the men found work as construction workers or bartenders while the women worked as waitresses, nannies or domestics.

Toward the end of the 20th century, Irish dominance gradually yielded to a mixture of other nationalities, but even as the neighborhood has seen growth in ethnic diversity today, the area still retains a strong Irish American presence, and there continue to be a number of Irish pubs and restaurants scattered across Woodside. After World War II, families in the area were primarily of Irish, Italian, and Jewish descent. Gradually, Dominicans and other nationalities began to make an appearance in the community, beginning in the late 1960s. A trend of diversity began then, and has continued since. This diversity has been remarked upon by many observers and can be shown in residents' places of worship. For example, the Winfield Reformed Church began in 1880 as a Dutch Calvinist church and in 1969 became the first Taiwanese congregation in America. Others of Woodside's places of worship now include ones that are Hindu, Thai Buddhist, Romanian Orthodox, Filipino, Korean, Chinese, and Bahraini. Woodside has a strong Muslim community and is home of a large, multipurpose organization, the Islamic Institute of New York. Among St. Sebastian Mass-goers, a priest reports that are about 45% are Hispanic (particularly from Colombia and Mexico), 25% Irish, 25% Filipino, and 5% Korean. In 1999, Woodsiders came from 49 countries and spoke 34 different languages.

In the early 1990s, many Asian American families moved into the area, particularly east of the 61st Street – Woodside subway station. In 2000, Woodside's population was 30% Asian American. Woodside has a large population of Thai Americans, Korean Americans, Chinese Americans and Filipino Americans (see Koreatown, Chinatown, and Little Manila), each with their own respective ethnic enclave. There are also South Asian Americans, particularly Indian Americans, Bangladeshi Americans, Nepalese Americans, and Pakistani Americans, as well as a large Dominican and Latino population. Reflecting its longtime diverse foods and drink, the neighborhood is filled with many cultural restaurants and pubs. It is also home to some of the city's most popular Thai, Filipino, Colombian, and Ecuadorian eateries. Woodside's diversity lends itself to a number of festivals and street fairs. It commemorates Saint Patrick's Day with a parade prior to the famous celebration in Manhattan. Woodside also hosts several events in the summer, including an Independence Day street fair.

=== Little Manila ===
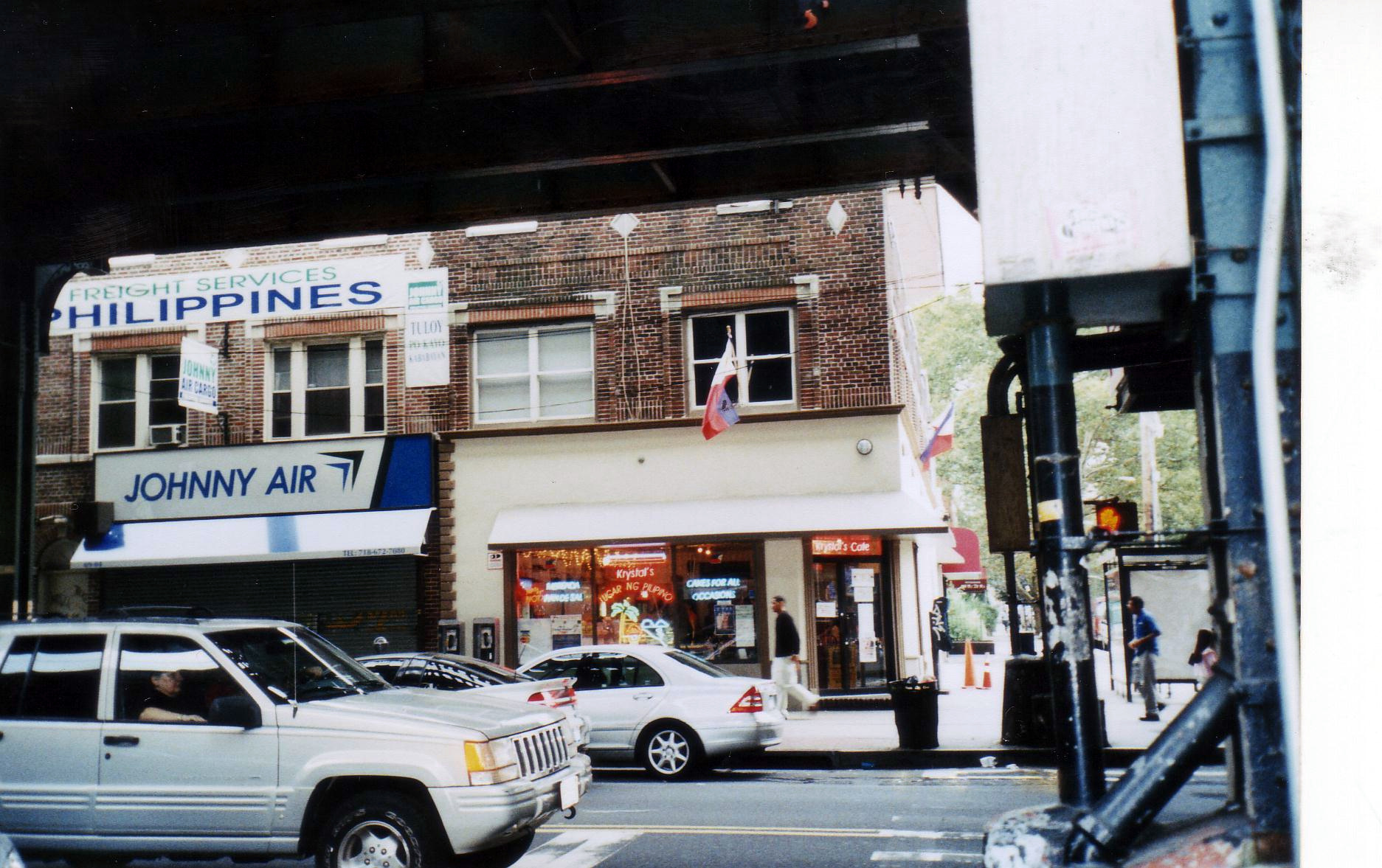
Woodside's Little Manila on Roosevelt Avenue

"Little Manila", or Filipinotown, stretches from 63rd-71st Streets on Roosevelt Avenue, where many Filipino-owned businesses have flocked to serve Woodside's large Filipino American community; the neighborhood is known for its concentration of Filipinos. Filipino cafés and restaurants dominate the area, as well as several freight and remittance centers scattered throughout the neighborhood. Other Filipino-owned businesses including professional services (medical, dental, optical), driving schools, beauty salons, immigration services, and video rental places providing the latest movies from the Philippines dot the community. This area attracts many local Filipinos and non-Filipinos alike and from neighboring places of Long Island, Connecticut, Pennsylvania, and New Jersey.

In February 2008, the Bayanihan Filipino Community Center opened its doors in Woodside, a project spearheaded by the Philippine Forum. The Philippine Forum also hosts the annual Bayanihan Cultural Festival at the Hart Playground in September in commemoration of Filipino American History Month.

The intersection of 70th Street and Roosevelt Avenue was co-named "Little Manila Avenue" on June 12, 2022, with a sign-unveiling ceremony to celebrate the Filipino community's growing presence and contributions in Queens. Concomitantly, there is also a Roosevelt Avenue in Quezon City, Philippines. The corner in Queens was co-named "Little Manila Avenue".

=== St. Patrick's Day Parade ===
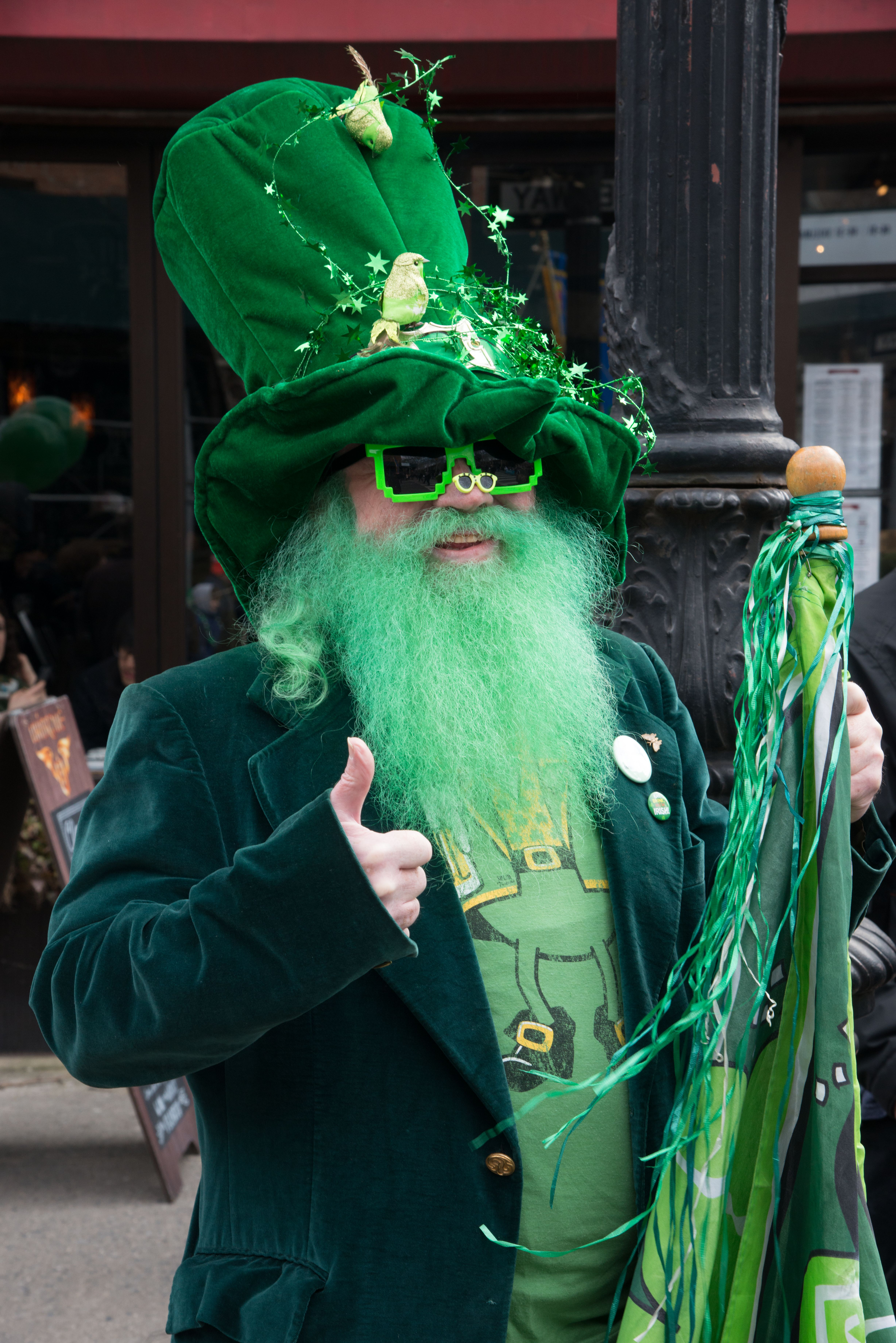
The Green Man, St. Pat's for All Parade

Woodside hosts New York City's only Saint Patrick's Day parade that invites members of New York City's LGBTQ Irish community to march; it is called the St. Pat's for All Parade. The parade was founded by LGBTQ+ rights activist Brendan Fay after the Irish Lesbian and Gay Organization (ILGO) was repeatedly denied permission to march in the Manhattan St. Patrick's Day parade by the Ancient Order of Hibernians. The parade runs from Sunnyside to Woodside, with its starting point in 43rd Street and Skillman Avenue.

==== History of St. Pat's for All ====
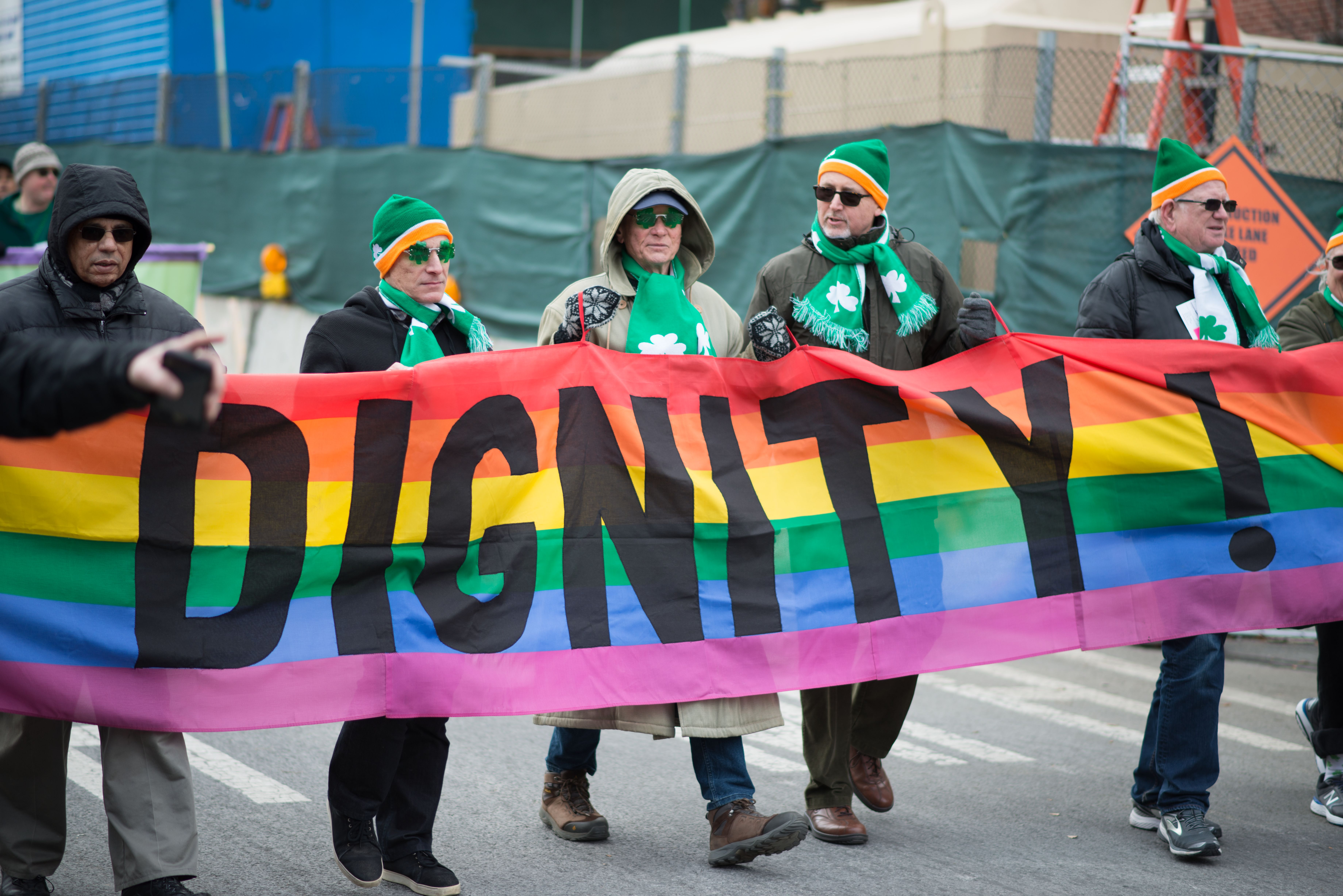
The people marching at the St. Patrick's for All Parade 2018

In 1991, the recently established gay and lesbian Irish organization ILGO was denied permission to march in the St. Patrick's Day Parade on Fifth Avenue. When New York City Mayor Dinkins intervened on their behalf, ILGO members were allowed to march for that one time, but their presence was received with hostility from other marchers as well as the spectators, who openly hurled abuse at them and doused with beer. In the years that followed, ILGO members would be denied permission to march, respond by protesting at the parade, and get arrested. Two court rulings then further endorsed the exclusion of LGBTQ marchers: in 1993, Federal Judge Kevin Thomas Duffy of the Federal District Court in Manhattan rules that the Ancient Order of Hibernians can ban LGBTQ marchers from the St. Patrick's' Parade in Manhattan; in 1995, the U.S. Supreme Court rules in Hurley v. Irish-American Gay, Lesbian, and Bisexual Group of Boston that private citizens organizing a public demonstration may not be compelled by the state to include groups who impart a message the organizers do not want to be presented by their demonstration.

In the wake of these court rulings, Brendan Fay founds the Lavender and Green Alliance (LAG), which organizes an inclusive event "open to anybody who wished to celebrate the spirit of Irishness and their connections to Ireland" and name it "St. Pat's for All". The slogan of the parade,"Cherishing All the Children of the Nation Equally," originates from the 1916 Easter Proclamation of the Irish Republic. The first parade was held on March 5, 2000.

The creation of the St. Pats for all parade provided a welcoming community for LGBT+ people of Irish descent and association. People of various cultures and backgrounds attend this parade for significant

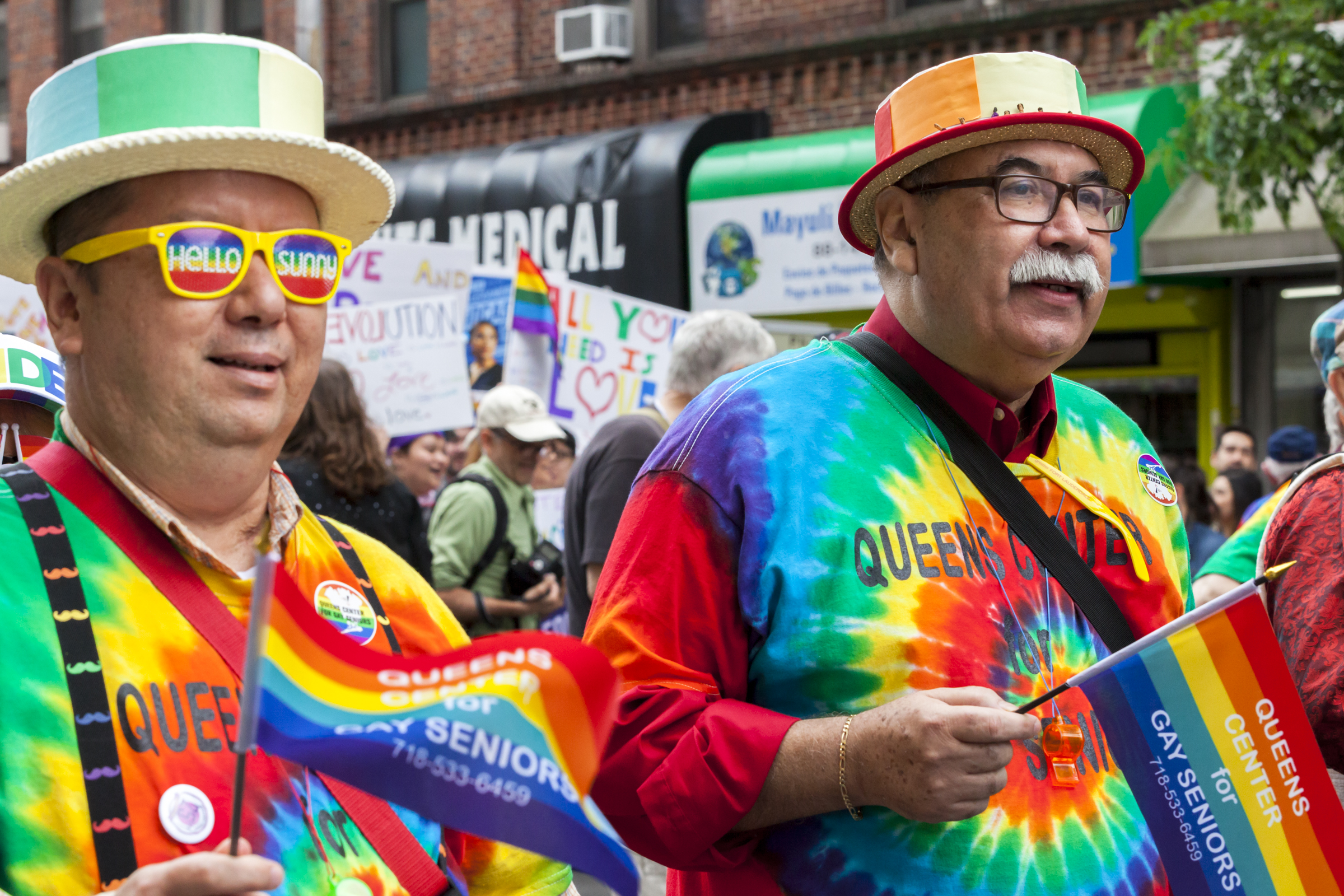
Senior participants at the Queens 2018 Pride Parade

reasons. In the inaugural year of 2000, the parade attracted over 70 groups of people, including the Korean community honoring the important role that Irish nuns had played in their education, Chilean folk musicians honoring Bernardo O' Higgins, the founding father and first president of Chile, and the son of an Irish immigrant, children and their puppets, the Sunny Side Drum Corps, and LGBT organizations. Many never imagined being a part of a tradition that didn't allow anything that distracted the Catholic expression. Woodside parade stands out because it welcomes anyone who wearing of green regardless of race, creed or sexual orientation. "The St. Patrick's parade is the most significant expression of Irish culture and celebration in this city, and the parade in Queens, for many of us, was a first-time experience. It was the first parade since the first St. Patrick's parade in New York City, which was in 1762, [that] was open and welcoming to all".

The parade has attracted such politicians as former New York City mayors Rudy Giuliani and Michael Bloomberg; Jason West, mayor of New Paltz, New York; former congressman Joseph Crowley, who represented the district; and former U.S. Senator and Secretary of State Hillary Clinton.

St. Pat's for All Parade celebrated its 20th anniversary on March 3, 2019.

== Police and crime ==
Woodside, Sunnyside, and Long Island City are patrolled by the 108th Precinct of the NYPD, located at 5-47 50th Avenue. The 108th Precinct ranked 25th safest out of 69 patrol areas for per-capita crime in 2010. As of 2018, with a non-fatal assault rate of 19 per 100,000 people, Woodside and Sunnyside's rate of violent crimes per capita is less than that of the city as a whole. The incarceration rate of 163 per 100,000 people is lower than that of the city as a whole.

The 108th Precinct has a lower crime rate than in the 1990s, with crimes across all categories having decreased by 88.2% between 1990 and 2018. The precinct reported 2 murders, 12 rapes, 90 robberies, 108 felony assaults, 109 burglaries, 490 grand larcenies, and 114 grand larcenies auto in 2018. In 2025, the precinct reported 2 murders, 22 rapes, 214 robberies, 297 felony assaults, 237 burglaries, 800 grand larcenies, and 253 grand larcenies auto. Wayback Machine

== Fire safety ==
Woodside is served by two New York City Fire Department (FDNY) fire stations:

- Engine Company 325/Ladder Company 163 – 41-24 51st Street
- Engine Company 292/Rescue 4 – 64-18 Queens Boulevard

In addition, FDNY EMS Station 45/EMS Telemetry is located at 58-65 52nd Road.

== Health ==
As of 2018, preterm births are more common in Woodside and Sunnyside than in other places citywide, but births to teenage mothers are less common. In Woodside and Sunnyside, there were 90 preterm births per 1,000 live births (compared to 87 per 1,000 citywide), and 14.9 births to teenage mothers per 1,000 live births (compared to 19.3 per 1,000 citywide). Woodside and Sunnyside has a high population of residents who are uninsured. In 2018, this population of uninsured residents was estimated to be 16%, which is higher than the citywide rate of 12%.

The concentration of fine particulate matter, the deadliest type of air pollutant, in Woodside and Sunnyside is 0.0093 milligrams per cubic metre (9.3×10^{−9} oz/ft^{3}), higher than the city average. Fourteen percent of Woodside and Sunnyside residents are smokers, which is equal to the city average of 14% of residents being smokers. In Woodside and Sunnyside, 20% of residents are obese, 9% are diabetic, and 23% have high blood pressure—compared to the citywide averages of 20%, 14%, and 24% respectively. In addition, 19% of children are obese, compared to the citywide average of 20%.

Ninety-two percent of residents eat some fruits and vegetables every day, which is higher than the city's average of 87%. In 2018, 79% of residents described their health as "good", "very good", or "excellent", slightly higher than the city's average of 78%. For every supermarket in Woodside and Sunnyside, there are 17 bodegas.

The nearest large hospitals in the area are the Elmhurst Hospital Center in Elmhurst and the Mount Sinai Hospital of Queens in Astoria.

== Post office and ZIP Code ==
Woodside is covered by the ZIP Code 11377. The United States Post Office operates the Woodside Station at 39-25 61st Street.

== Education ==
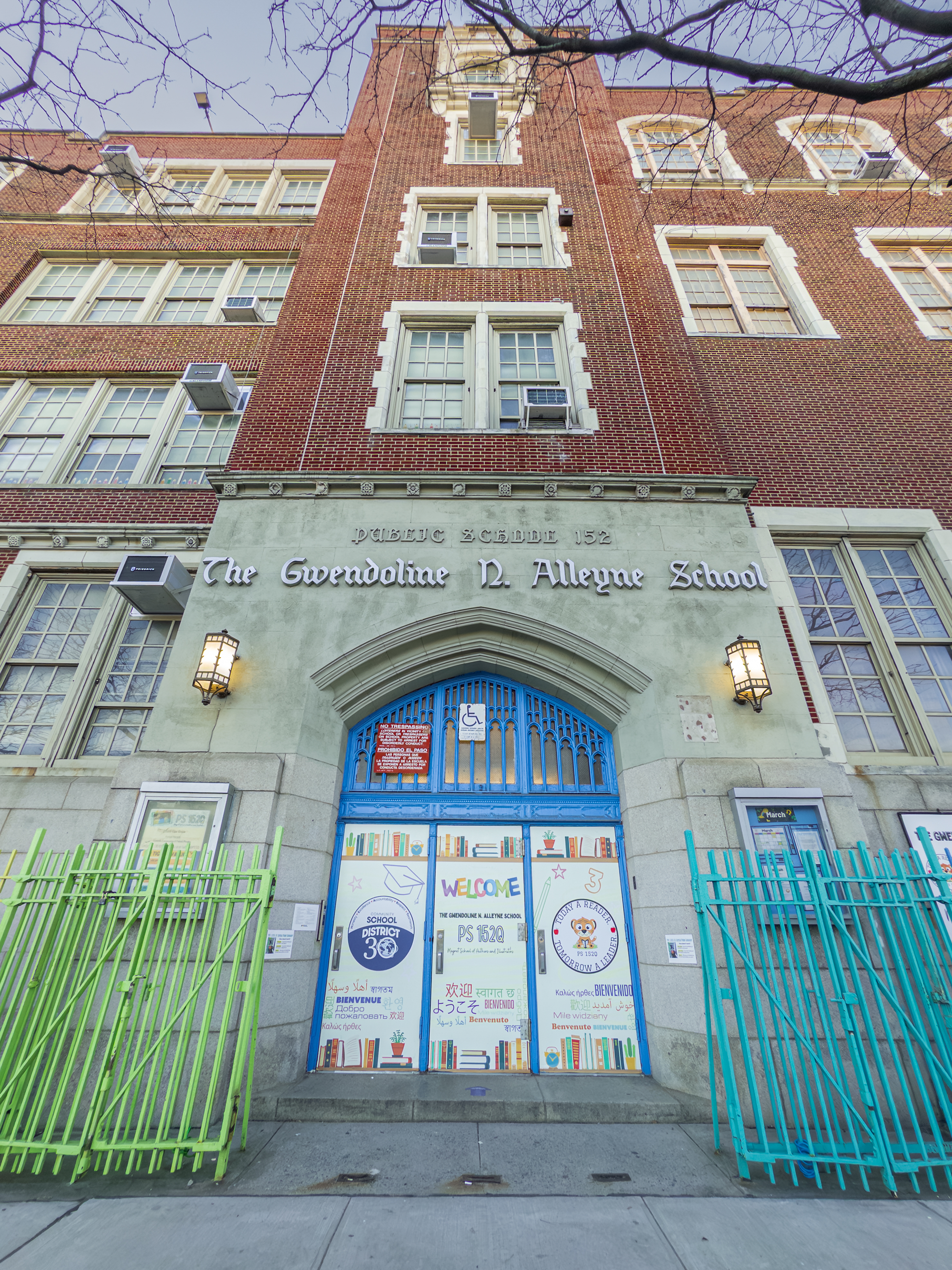
Entrance to P.S. 152 Gwendoline N. Alleyne School in Woodside

Woodside and Sunnyside generally has a slightly higher ratio of college-educated residents than the rest of the city as of 2018. While 45% of residents age 25 and older have a college education or higher, 19% have less than a high school education and 35% are high school graduates or have some college education. By contrast, 39% of Queens residents and 43% of city residents have a college education or higher. The percentage of Woodside and Sunnyside students excelling in math rose from 40% in 2000 to 65% in 2011, and reading achievement rose from 45% to 49% during the same time period.

Woodside and Sunnyside's rate of elementary school student absenteeism is less than the rest of New York City. In Woodside and Sunnyside, 11% of elementary school students missed twenty or more days per school year, lower than the citywide average of 20%. Additionally, 86% of high school students in Woodside and Sunnyside graduate on time, more than the citywide average of 75%.

=== Schools ===
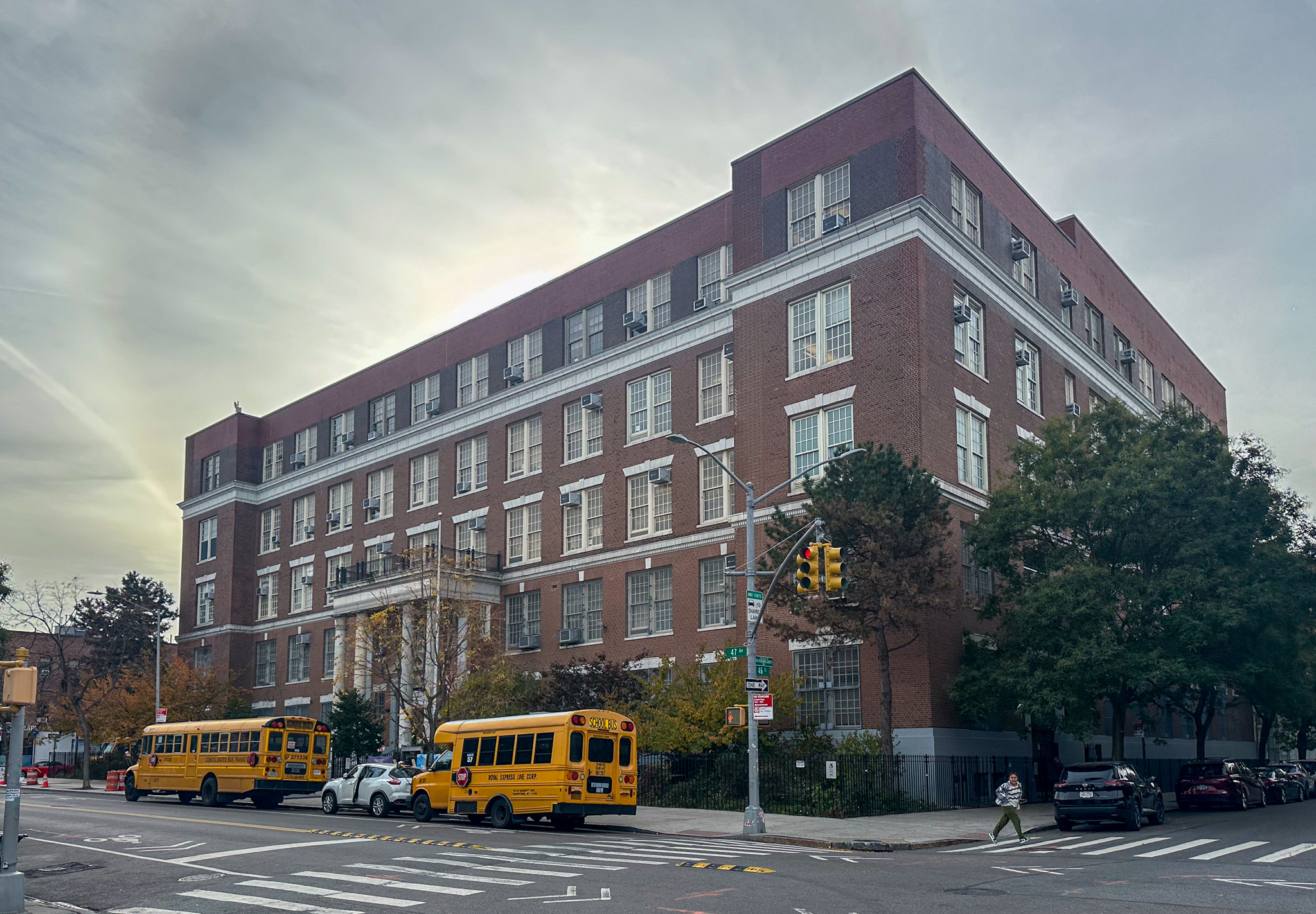
Front of the I.S.125 Thomas J.McCann Intermediate school in 47th ave, Woodside, Queens.

School yard at P.S. 229 Emanuel Kaplan in Woodside, fall 2026

Woodside contains the following public schools:

- PS 11 Kathryn Phelan (grades K-6)
- PS 12 James B Colgate (grades K-5)
- PS 151 Mary D Carter (grades PK-5)
- PS 152 Gwendolyn N Alleyne School (grades PK-5)
- PS 229 Emanuel Kaplan (grades PK-5)
- IS 125 Thomas J McCann Woodside Intermediate School (grades 6–8)
- William Cullen Bryant High School (grades 9–12)

There are also several private schools, including:

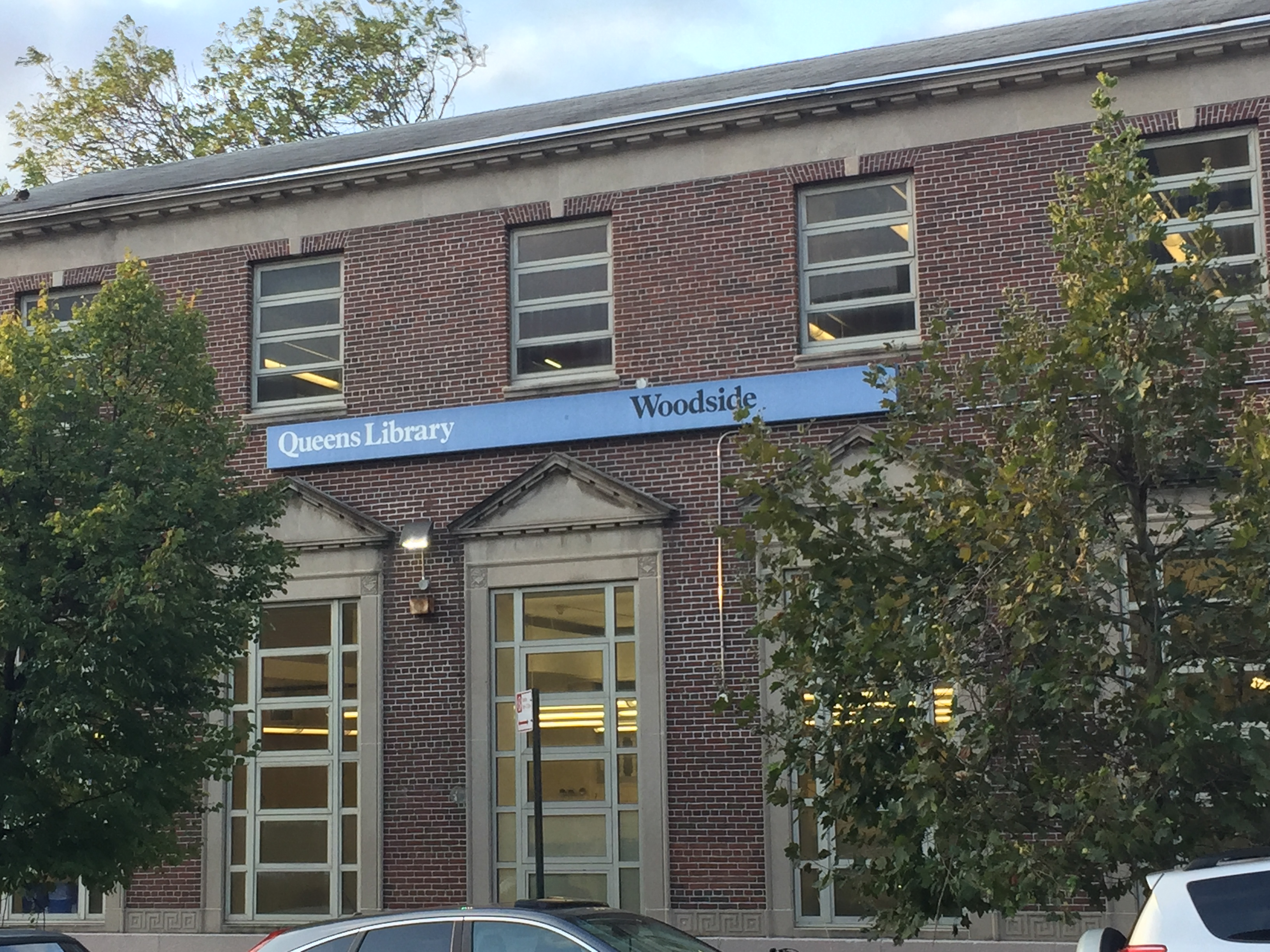
Woodside Library at 54-22 Skillman Av.

- Corpus Christi Elementary School
- Greater New York Academy, a Seventh Day Adventist school
- Razi School
- Saint Sebastian's Catholic Academy

=== Library ===
The Queens Public Library's Woodside branch is located at 54-22 Skillman Avenue.

== Green spaces ==
Parks in the area include:

- Doughboy Plaza, bounded by Woodside Avenue, 52nd Street, and 39th Road. It was originally a children's playground but is now a landscaped triangle.
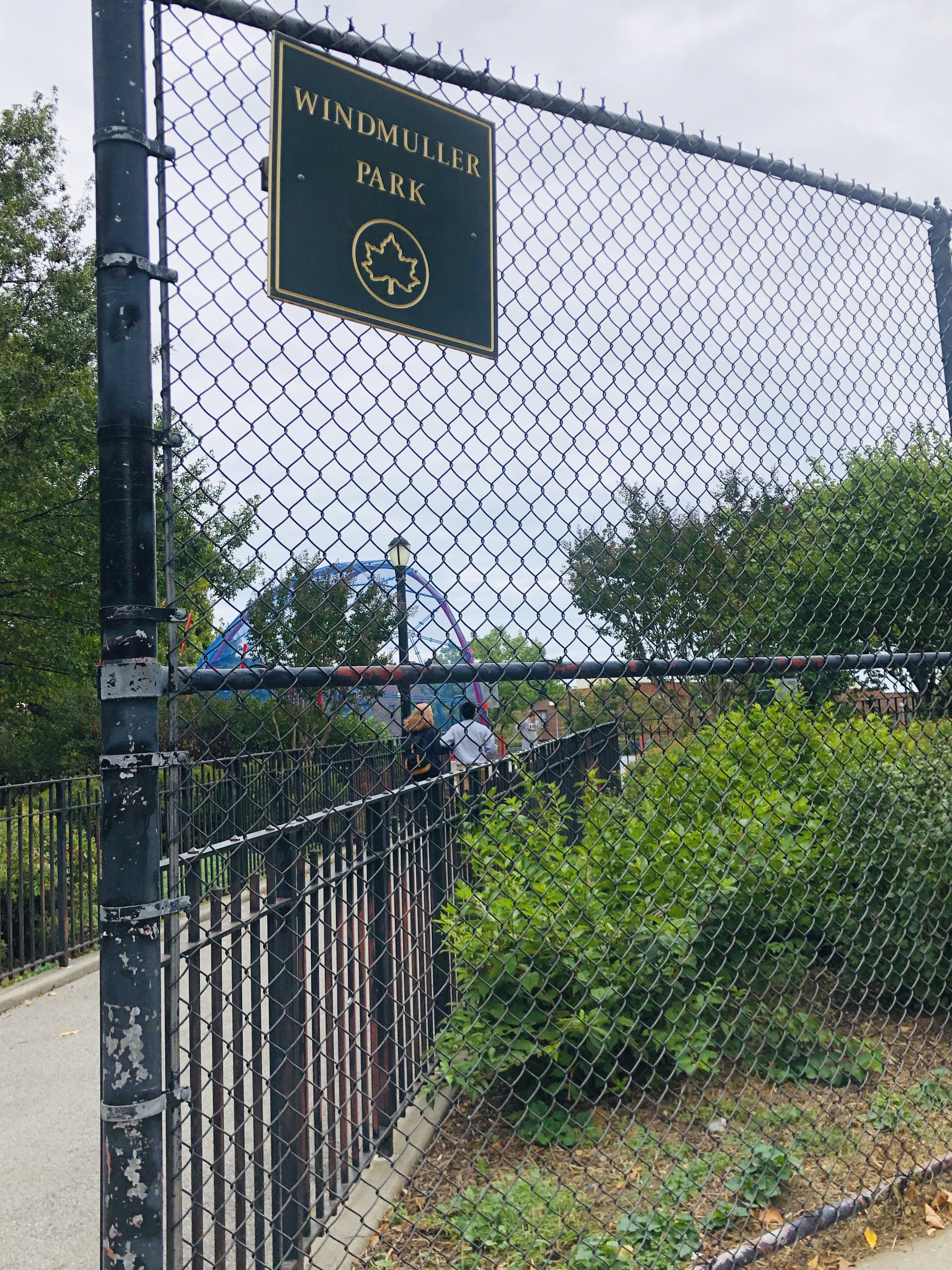
- Windmuller Park
  Windmuller Park (including Lawrence Virgilio Playground), between 39th Road and 39th Drive from 52nd to 54th Streets. It was named after Louis Windmuller, a local resident who was a German immigrant and a businessman. In 1936, Windmuller's children donated the family land to the city and it developed shortly after under the Federal Works Progress Administration relief work program. In 2002, the park's playground was named for Lawrence Virgilio (1962–2001), a New York City Firefighter who died in the World Trade Center in the 2001 September 11 attacks. Facilities include fields and courts for baseball and handball; a playground and spray shower; a running track; a swimming pool; and fitness equipment. In 2007, a capital investment project added an open-air stage, a renovated ADA-accessible public restroom, mini-pool, exercise track, pathways, fencing, basketball courts, and new exercise equipment.
- Big Bush Park, north side of Laurel Hill Boulevard between 61st and 64th Streets. In 1936, Mayor Fiorello H. LaGuardia (1882–1947, mayor 1934–1945) designated this land as parkland. In December 1936, the Regional Plan Association recommended the construction of a link between the Gowanus Parkway and the Triborough Bridge. The park was ultimately built on a plot of land created during the Brooklyn-Queens Expressway's construction in the 1950s and opened in 1987, sixteen years after construction started. The park's facilities include fields and courts for baseball, basketball, handball, and soccer; a playground with climbing structures, swings, slides, and sitting areas; a spray shower, and fitness equipment.
- Nathan Weidenbaum Playground, south side of Laurel Hill Boulevard at 61st Street. It was named after a local resident who was one of the first occupants of the Wynwoode Gardens Homes and advocated for improvements to the area.
- John Vincent Daniels Jr. Square, 43rdand Roosevelt Avenues between 50th, 51st, and 52nd Streets, honors Vincent Daniels Jr., a Woodside resident killed in action during World War I. He served as a Private 1st Class in the 102nd Field Signal Company and died during the final days of the war in 1918. In 1933 the Board of Alderman named this site Vincent Daniels Square, "to pay tribute to a son of Queens County who made the supreme sacrifice in the World War.
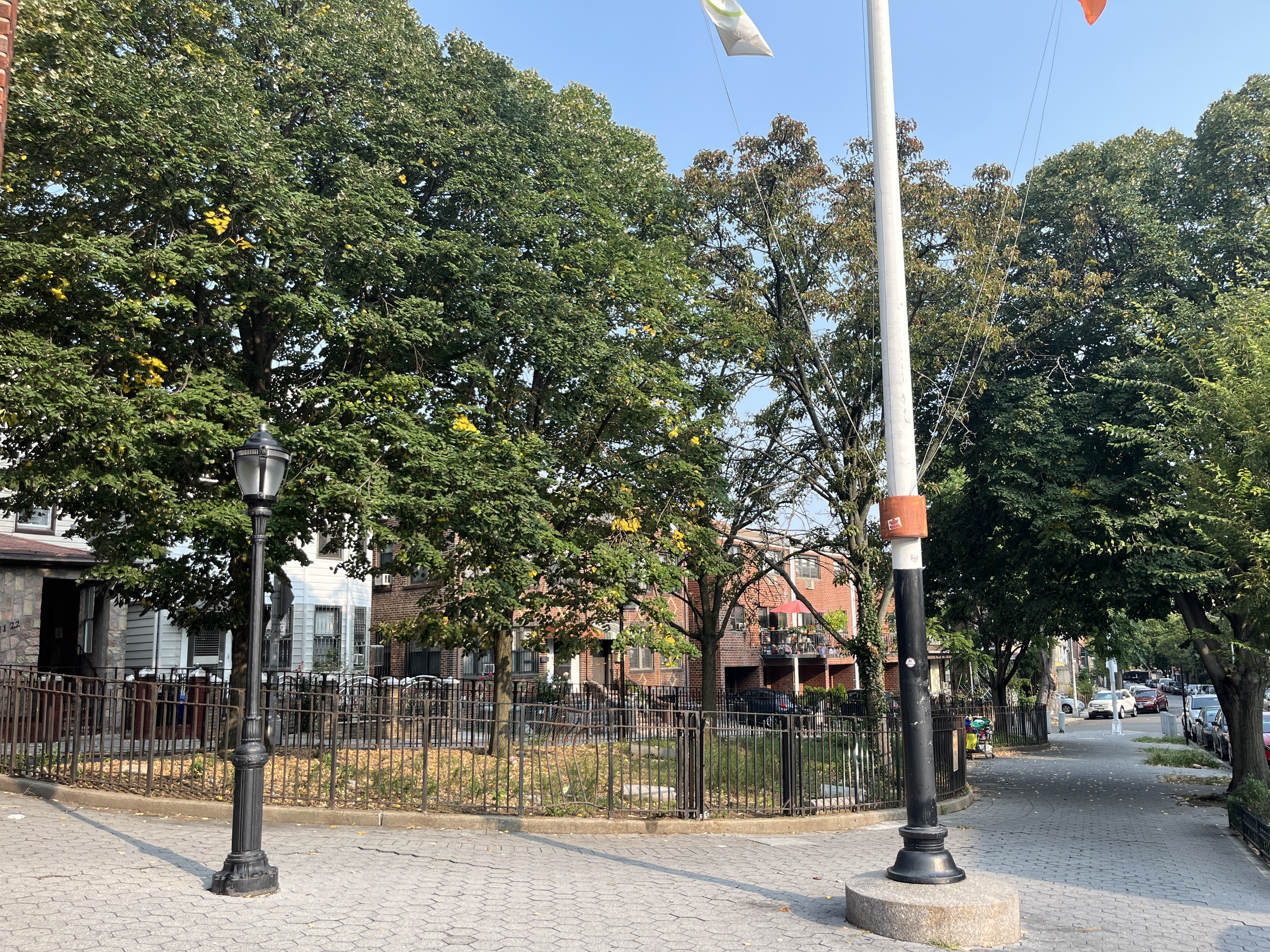
- Image of High Hopes Triangle
  High Hopes Triangle, a parklet at the meeting point of 66th and 67th Streets north of Woodside Boulevard. This park recognizes the song "High Hopes" through a set of concrete markers with lyrics from the song.

In addition, the Moore-Jackson Cemetery on 51st and 54th Streets, between 31st and 32nd Avenues, contains a community garden. The cemetery is a New York City designated landmark with over 40 interments dating between 1733 and 1868.

== Structures ==
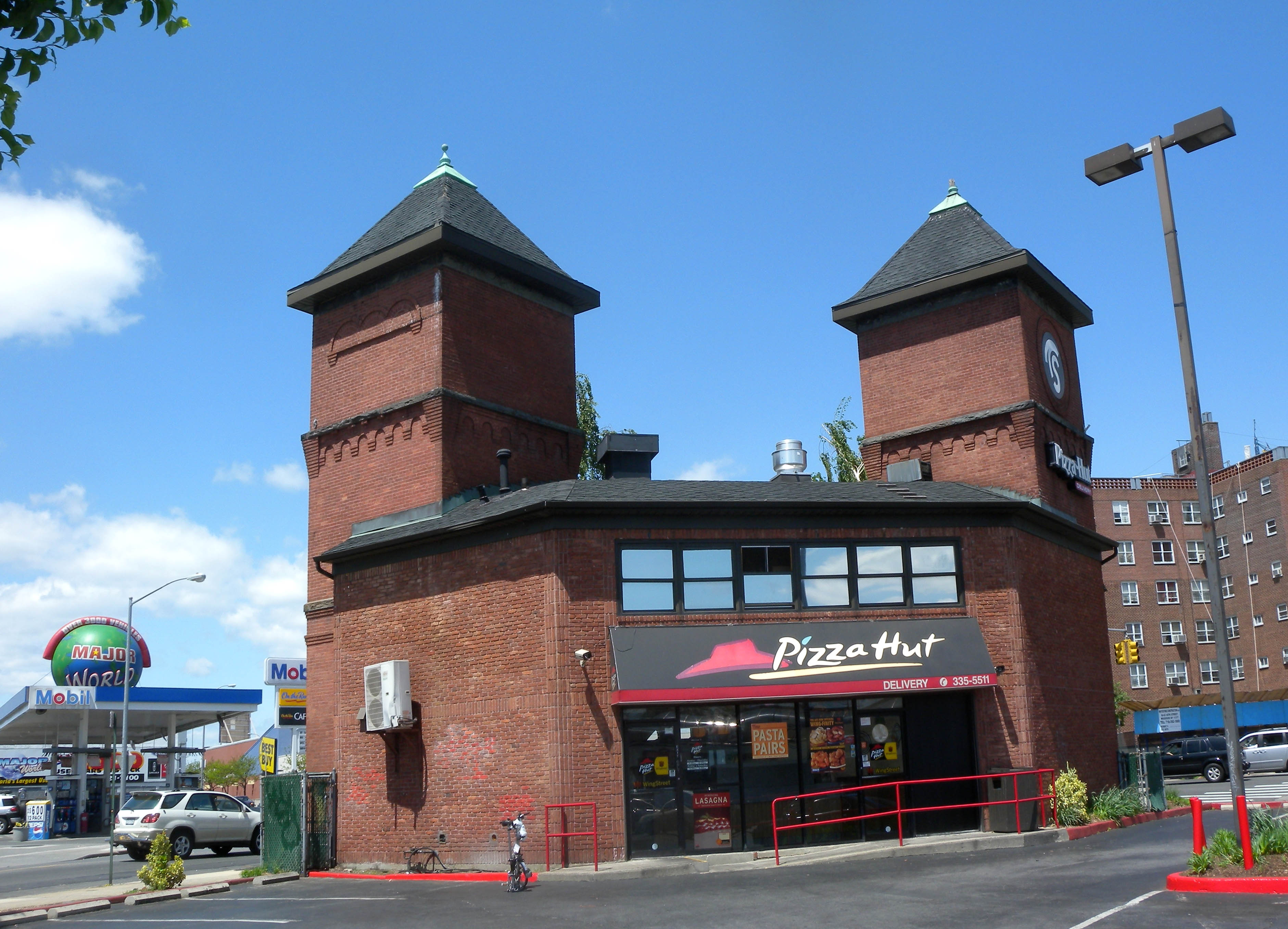
Former trolley car barn

As in other parts of New York City, centuries of tumultuous change have not totally obliterated old landmarks. Within Woodside, the double-decker station of the Long Island Rail Road (built in 1869) and the IRT Flushing Line (built in 1917) both remain, and were renovated in 1999. A trolley barn at Northern Boulevard and 51st Street has been preserved as the Tower Square Shopping Center. The New York and Queens Railroad Company built the barn in 1896. A transportation hub like the LIRR/IRT stations, it was the largest car barn in Queens.

Woodside also possesses an ancient tree, not the great chestnut (which was gone by the end of the 19th century) but a large copper beech of somewhere between 150 and 300 years' age. Documents in the archive of the Queens Historical Society suggest that it might have been planted during the time of the Revolutionary War.

Among the oldest of Woodside's historic landmarks are its cemeteries. Calvary Cemetery was founded in 1845 by trustees of Manhattan's St. Patrick's Cathedral for Roman Catholic burials and was later expanded by the addition of three sections comprising New Calvary. Calvary and New Calvary's combined 300 acres (120 ha) contain over three million burials. Located on 54th Street between 31st & 32nd Avenues, the Moore-Jackson Cemetery is much older and smaller than Calvary. Established in 1733, it is one of the oldest cemeteries in New York. Only fifteen graves remain visible, the earliest dated 1769.

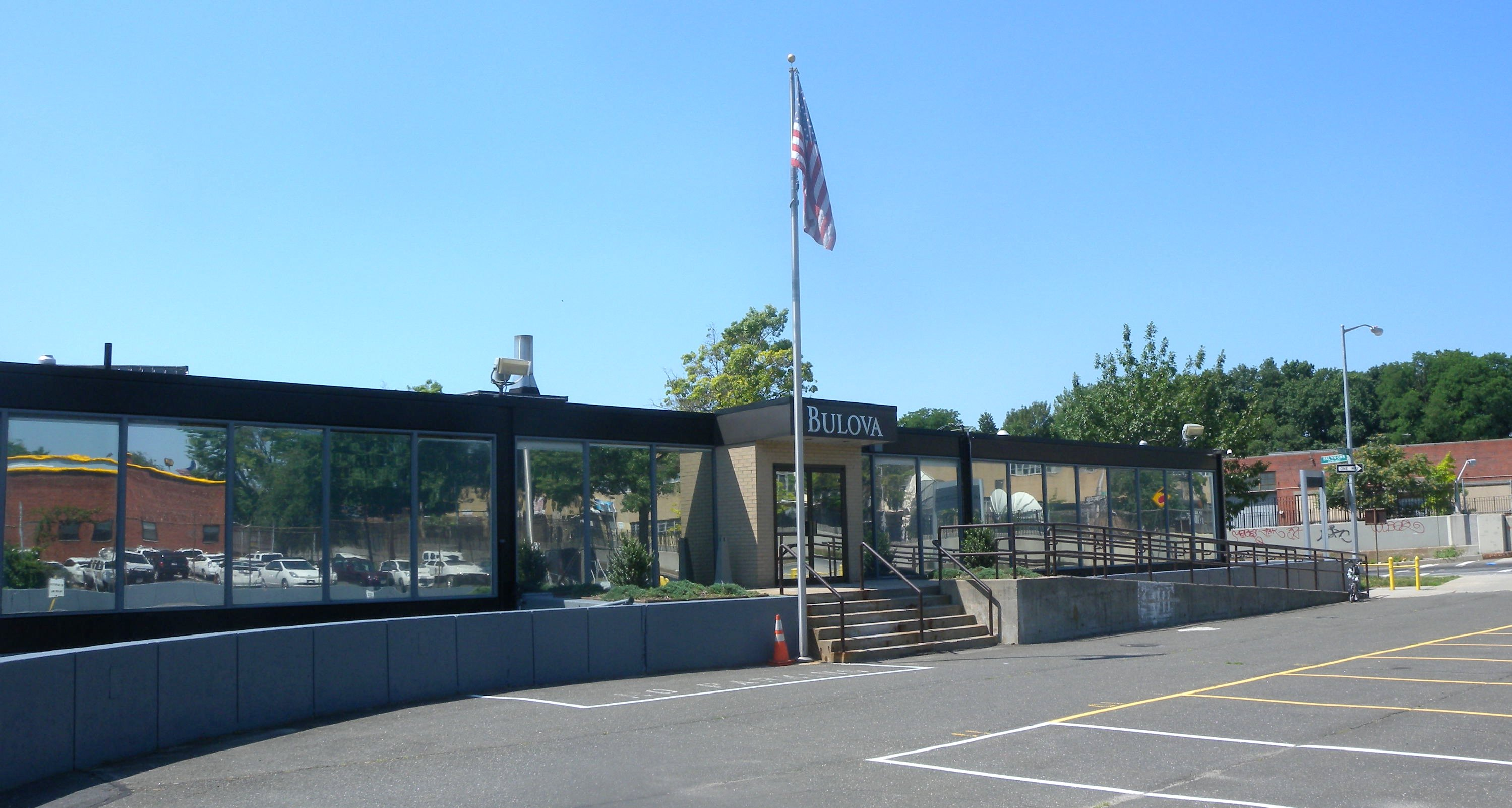
Bulova Corporation previous headquarters in Woodside

The Bulova Corporation had its headquarters in northern Woodside along Interstate 278 until 2014, when it sold the building for $30 million and relocated to the Empire State Building. The headquarters opened in 1875.

Although few have been documented, some of Woodside's old buildings still remain in place. Of those for which information is available, Woodside's first church, St. Paul's Protestant Episcopal, holds pride of place. It was damaged by fire in 2007 but still stands in its original location. An article published on the Forgotten NY weblog in 2005 lists this and other interesting structures from 19th century Woodside which have survived. All are located close to the center of town. They include the Hook and Ladder Company (1884), the home of Otto Groeber and his family (1870), the Woodside Pavilion (1877), and Meyer's Hotel (1882). Another article on this blog shows structures from the early 20th century that are still standing. In addition, the Winfield Reformed Church is located in Woodside.

== Transportation ==
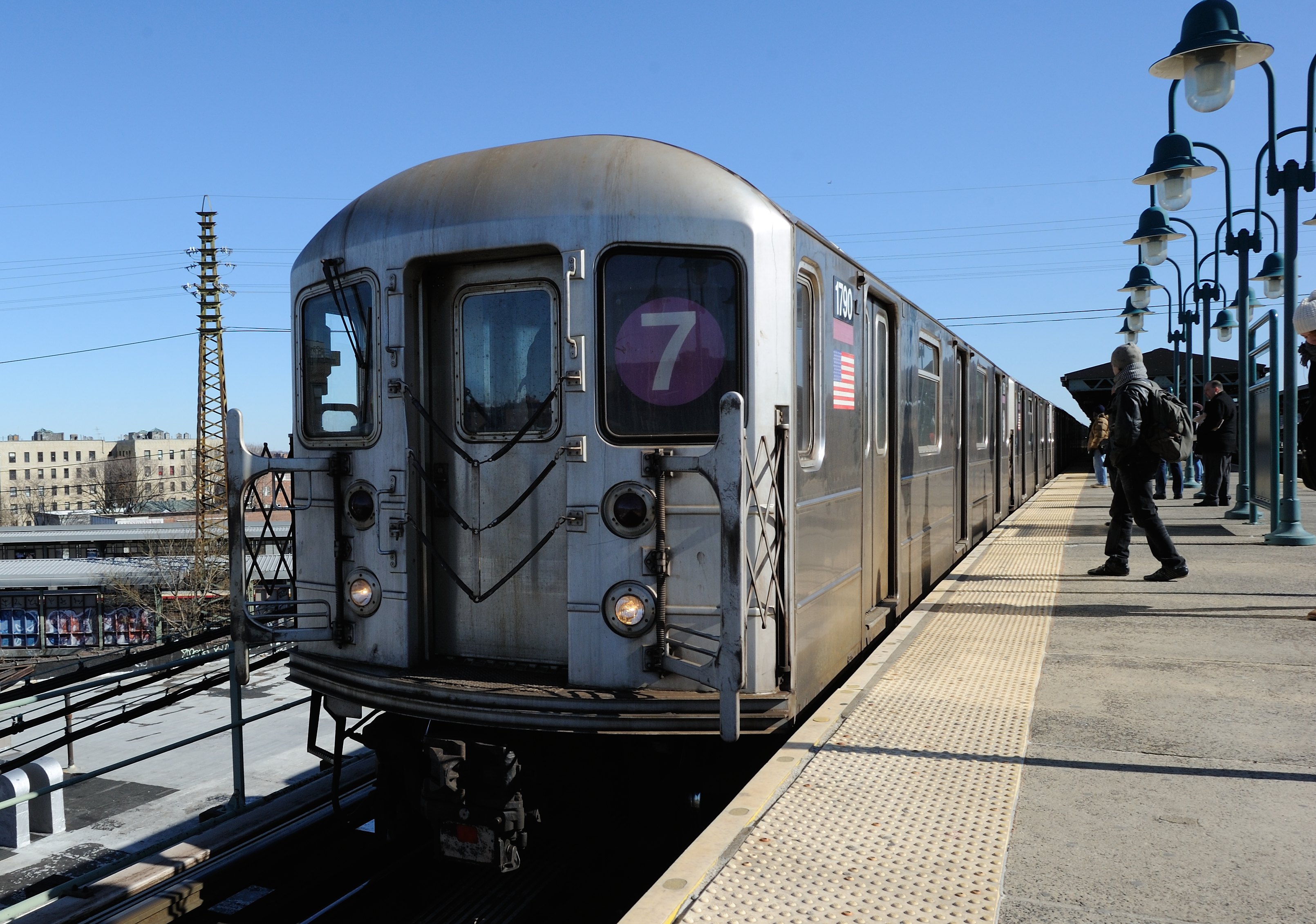
61st Street–Woodside station

The IRT Flushing Line (7 and <7> trains) of the New York City Subway has stations at 52nd (local), 61st (express) and 69th Streets (local) on Roosevelt Avenue; the IND Queens Boulevard Line local services (E, F, M, and R trains) make stops at Northern Boulevard and 65th Street along Broadway.

The Woodside station of the LIRR is connected to the 61st Street subway station. The Q18, Q32, Q39, Q47, Q53 SBS, Q60 and Q70 SBS buses connect Woodside to the rest of Queens; the Q32 and Q60 run to Manhattan, and the Q70 SBS goes to LaGuardia Airport via Roosevelt Avenue/74th Street.

The Brooklyn-Queens Expressway (I-278) is a major highway passing through the area, serving Woodside via exits 39 through 43, as is the Long Island Expressway (I-495) via exit 18. Northern Boulevard (NY 25A) and Queens Boulevard (NY 25) also pass through Woodside.

== Notable residents ==
Notable current or former residents include:

- Edward Burns (born 1968), actor
- James Caan (1940–2022), actor, attended P.S. 150
- Francis Ford Coppola (born 1939), movie director, screenwriter, producer
- Morton Feldman (1926–1987), 20th-century composer
- Chris Gethard (born 1980), author, comedian, and star of the Comedy Central show Big Lake.
- Evelyn Fox Keller (1936–2023), physicist, author and feminist, who is professor emerita of History and Philosophy of Science at the Massachusetts Institute of Technology.
- Joel Klein (born 1946), former New York City Schools Chancellor, lived in the Woodside Houses housing project
- Harry Marmion (1931–2008), served as president of St. Xavier University and Southampton College of Long Island University, and was president of the United States Tennis Association (USTA) during the construction and opening of the Arthur Ashe Stadium.
- Frank McCourt (1930–2009), Pulitzer Prize-winning author
- Edmar Mednis (1937–2002), International Grandmaster of chess
- Jack Mercer (1910–1984), voice actor, animator and writer, who was best known as the voice of cartoon characters Popeye the Sailor and Felix the Cat.
- Robert Emmett O'Malley (born 1943), U.S. Marine veteran of Vietnam War; Medal of Honor recipient.
- Thomas J. Pickard (born 1950), acting Director of the Federal Bureau of Investigation for 71 days in mid-2001 following the tenure of Director Louis Freeh.
- Charlotte E. Ray, (1850–1911), the first Black American female lawyer in the United States.
- Lynn Samuels (1942–2011), radio host
- Joe Spinell (1936–1989), actor
