= Harry Marmion =

American lawyer

Harry A. Marmion (June 14, 1931 in Queens, New York – August 14, 2008 in Williamsburg, Virginia) served as president of two colleges, St. Xavier University and Southampton College of Long Island University, and as president of the United States Tennis Association (USTA) during the construction and opening of the Arthur Ashe Stadium.

== Early life ==
Marmion grew up in Woodside, Queens and graduated from La Salle Academy in New York, New York. He then received his bachelor's degree from Fairfield University where he was a member of the Fairfield Stags men's basketball team, wrote a sports column for the school newspaper and served on the debate team. Following his graduation, Marmion served in the Marine Corps as an infantry officer stationed in Japan for 2 years during the Korean War and then continued his service in the Marine Corps Reserve for 26 years, retiring as a colonel. Upon returning to the U.S. from Japan, Marmion obtained a J.D. and LL.M in labor law from the Georgetown University Law Center and a master's and Ph.D. in education from the University of Connecticut.

== Academics ==
Marmion served as the 12th president of St. Xavier University in Chicago from 1969 to 1972 and Southampton College of Long Island University from 1972 to 1980. He then was vice president for academic affairs and professor of law at Fairleigh Dickinson University from 1980 to 1990.

== Tennis ==
During the 1980s Marmion was ranked as a senior player in the Eastern Tennis Association, despite the fact that he had never played tennis until he was in his 30s. After retiring from academics, Marmion pursued his love of tennis by first serving as the president of the Eastern Tennis Association and on the board of directors of the USTA. He then became the 43rd chairman and president of the USTA's board in 1997. During his tenure, he oversaw the building and opening of the Arthur Ashe Stadium at the Billie Jean King National Tennis Center in Queens, New York. Marmion was instrumental in ensuring that the stadium be named in honor of Arthur Ashe, rather than for a corporate sponsor. In 1999, the International Tennis Hall of Fame honored Marmion with the Samuel Hardy Award in recognition of his long and outstanding service at the national level to the sport of tennis.

== Author ==
Marmion was a frequent writer and speaker on matters pertaining to higher education and the military draft, publishing two books, The Case Against the Volunteer Army (1971, ISBN 978-0-812-96147-8) and Selective Service: Conflict and Compromise (1968, ISBN 978-4-715-72357-7). U.S. Senator Edward Kennedy wrote that Marmion 'had written the best and most exhaustive description I have seen of what actually happened to the attempt to reform the draft.'
