= Bobby Reeves =

Robert, Rob, Bob or Bobby Reeves may refer to:

== Performers ==
- Bob Reeves (actor) (1892–1960), American lead in silents and later bit player
- Rob Reeves, English guitarist for 1999–2004 Defenestration (band)
- Bobby Reeves (singer), American 2000s vocalist for Adema and LEVEL

== Others ==
- Robert Reeves, Australian mayor of Geelong in 1872
- Bobby Reeves (baseball) (1904–1993), American infielder
- Robert Reeves, American astrophotographer since 1958, asteroid 26591 Robertreeves is named after him
- Robert Reeves (author), American literary critic, short story writer and novelist since 1970

== See also ==
- Robert Reeve (disambiguation)
