= Doctor of Humane Letters =

Honorary doctorate

The degree of Doctor of Humane Letters (Latin: Litterarum humanarum doctor; DHumLitt, DHL, or LHD) is an honorary degree awarded to those who have distinguished themselves through humanitarian and philanthropic contributions to society.

The criteria for awarding the degree differ from institution to institution; however, it is typically given to persons outside the university invited to be keynote speakers at the most important university events, or to faculty members or alumni of the institution who have, in the eyes of the institution or the wider world, distinguished themselves in some way.

The flexibility in interpretation has resulted in universities awarding unique variants of the degree. For example, in 1996 Southampton College awarded Kermit the Frog an honorary "doctorate of Amphibious Letters" in recognition for his contribution to children's education.
