= Razi School =

Islamic school in New York, United States

Coordinates: 40.74241°N 73.90975°W

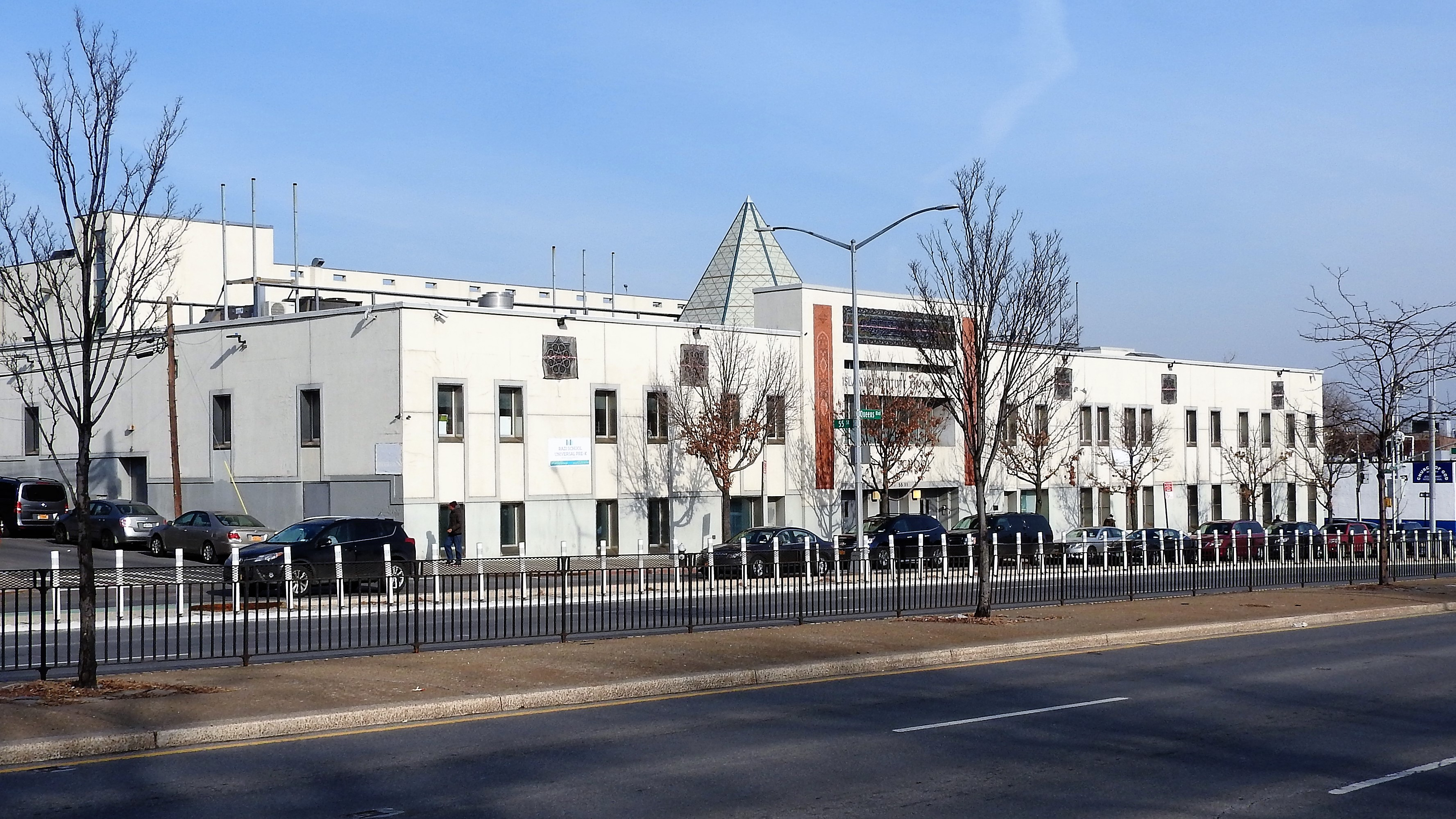
- 55-11 Queens Blvd; Woodside, NY 11377

Information
- Type: Private
- Motto: Academic excellence in a distinctive Islamic environment
- Principal: Seyed H. Karimi
- Grades: K to 12th grade
- Website: Official website

Razi School is an Islamic school in Woodside, New York. The school has partnered with NYC Department of Early Childhood Education in offering tuition-free full day Pre-Kindergarten classes for all 4-year-old children.

Razi School is in the same building as the Islamic Institute of New York.
