= Robert Reeve =

Robert Reeve may refer to:

- Robert Campbell Reeve (1902–1980), American pilot and airline founder
- Sir Robert Reeve, 2nd Baronet (1652–1688), English politician

== See also ==
- Robert Reeves (disambiguation)
