= Winfield Reformed Church =

Coordinates: 40°44′33.5″N 73°53′51″W

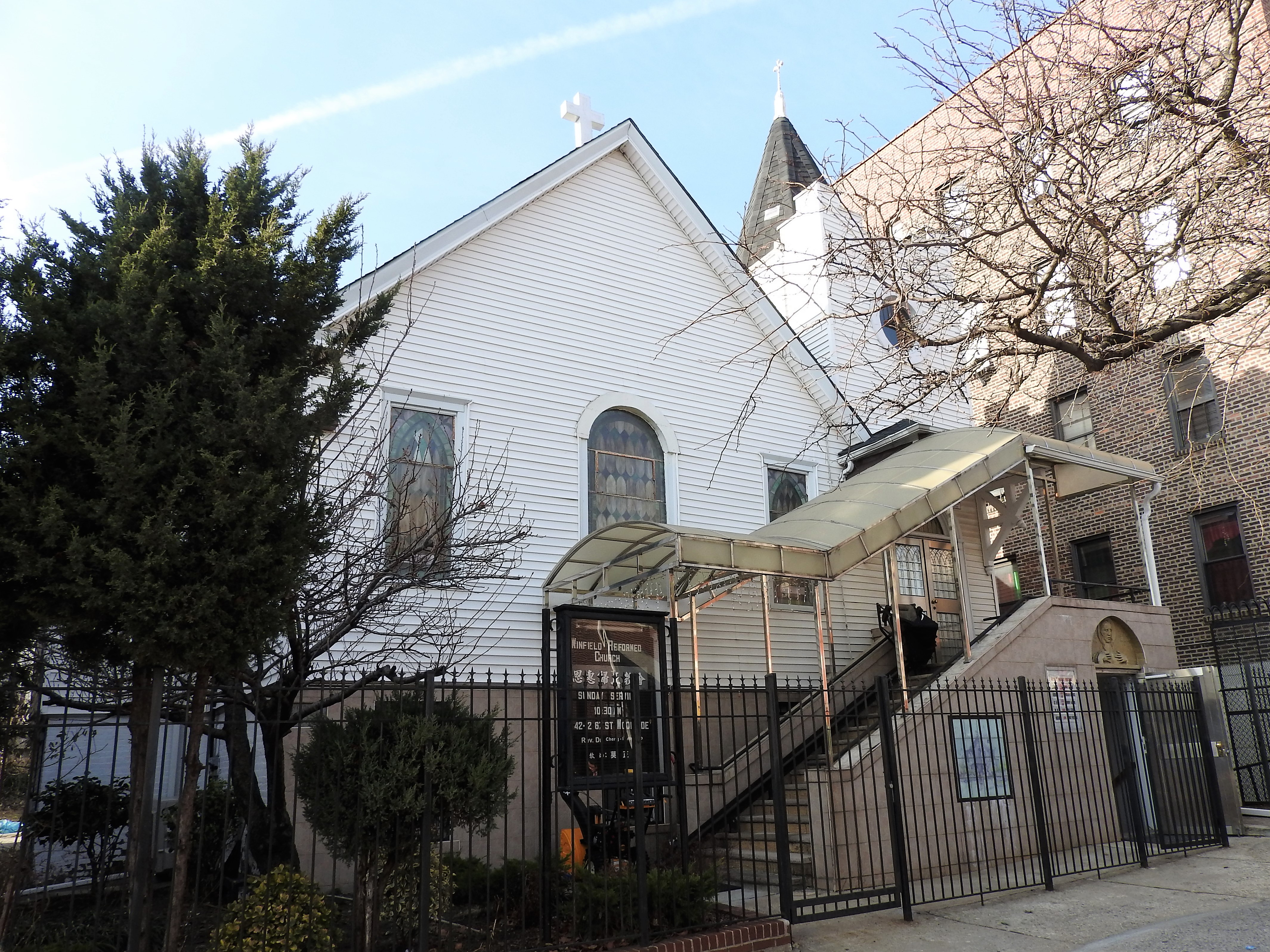
Exterior

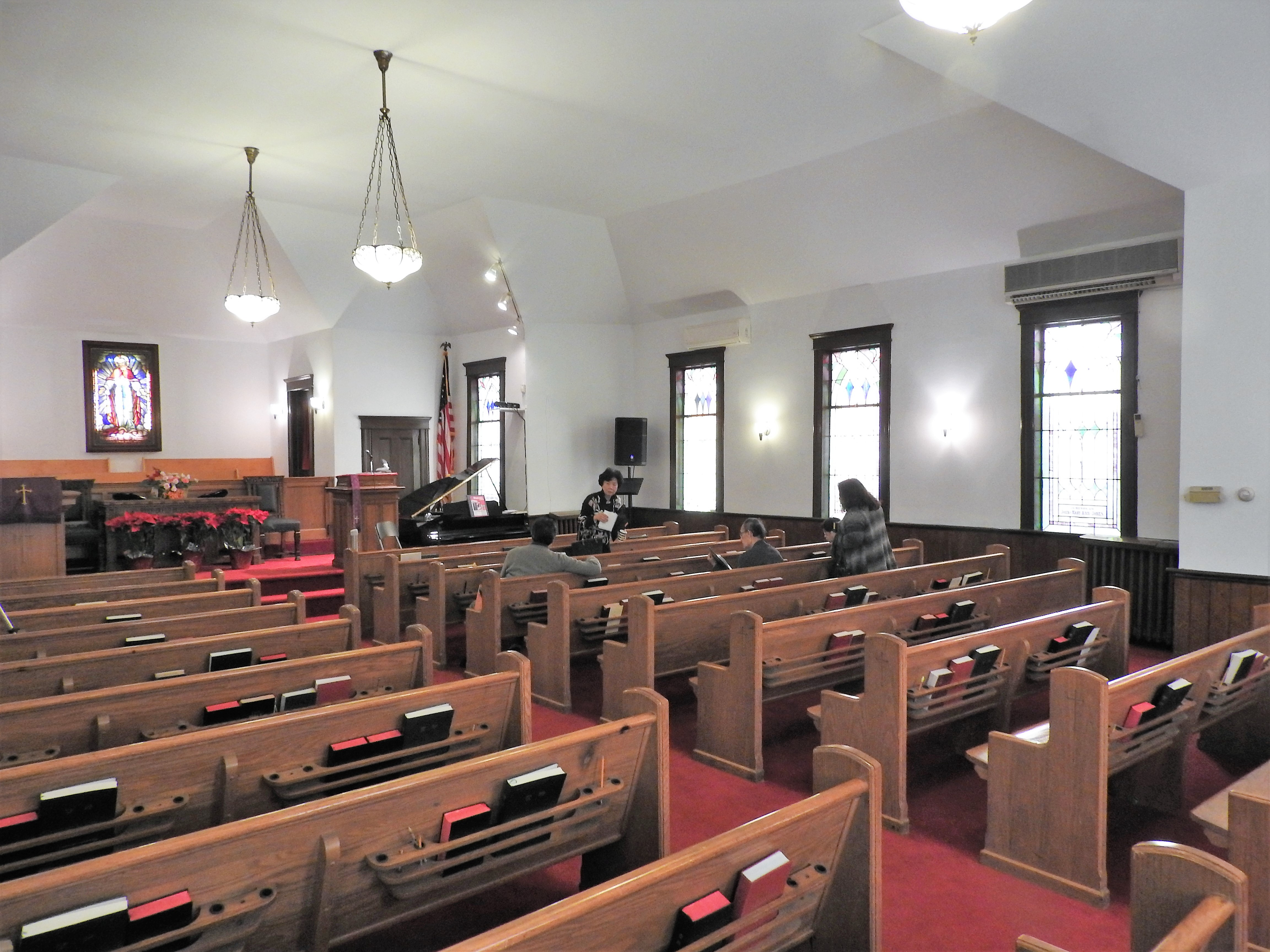
Interior

Winfield Reformed Church (Chinese: 恩惠歸正教會) is a Protestant church founded in 1880, located in Woodside, Queens, New York City. The church was originally located on Queens Boulevard and moved to its current location in 1910. The current building was built in 1914. It is part of the Reformed Church in America (RCA) denomination. It is the oldest Taiwanese church established in North America.

== History ==
The church was historically Dutch-speaking and remained a mainly white congregation until a large wave of Taiwanese immigrants came in the community in the 1960s. It became mostly Taiwanese in the late 1960s and became the first mainly Taiwanese congregation in North America in 1969. Preaching continued in both English and Taiwanese.

== Taiwanese activism ==
Winfield was a hotbed for Taiwanese independence activism outside of Taiwan for many decades. Pastors and worshipers frequently engaged in Taiwan rallies and causes. When China replaced Taiwan on the United Nations in 1979 NBC sent reporters to interview the opinions of New York Taiwanese at Winfield.

== Notable people ==
The church was led by many renowned Taiwanese ministers, beginning with Rev. Andrew Kuo (Chinese: 郭得烈) in the 1960s who volunteered to serve as minister while working for the American Bible Society. After Winfield, Rev. Kuo was also influential in founding another presbyterian church in New Brunswick, NJ.

Acclaimed Taiwanese independence activist and pastor Dr. Wu-Tong Hwang (Chinese: 黃武東) also served as senior pastor at Winfield from 1973 to 1978. Hwang was trained in the Presbyterian Church in Taiwan and came to the United States in 1973 after being politically exiled by the Kuomintang government. Rev. Dr. Hwang died in November 1994.

Rev. Dr. Martin Wang (Chinese: 王成章), a former professor at Taiwan Theological Seminary, served as minister in the 1980s. He died in 2007. Dr. Wang was a translator of the Chinese Bible.

Taiwanese musician and composer Michael Cheng (Chinese: 鄭明堂) attended Winfield and directed the church choir before moving back to Taiwan.
