= Lou Ann Walker =

American novelist

Lou Ann Walker is an author and a professor in the MFA in Creative Writing and Literature Program at Stony Brook Southampton, as well as a founding Editor of The Southampton Review. Her memoir A Loss for Words received a Christopher Award for high standards in Communication.

Her fiction and nonfiction has appeared in many publications, including The New York Times Magazine, Esquire, Life, Allure, Parade, The Chicago Sun-Times, The New York Times Book Review, O: The Oprah Magazine, The Writer, and The Hopewell Review. Formerly an editor at Esquire and New York Magazine, Walker has lectured on writing at Smith College and Yale University, and taught at Marymount Manhattan College, Southampton College, and Columbia University.

Her awards include a Marguerite Higgins reporting award and an NEA grant in Creative Writing. The author of several screenplays, she is also a member of the Writers Guild of America.

== Publications ==
- Hand, Heart, and Mind: The Story of the Education of America's Deaf People (1994)
- Roy Lichtenstein: The Artist at Work (1994)
- A Loss for Words: The Story of Deafness in a Family (1987)
- Amy: The Story of a Deaf Child (1985)
