= Robert Reeves (author) =

American novelist

Robert Reeves is an American novelist, short fiction writer, and literary critic. He is the founding director of the Stony Brook Southampton MFA in Creative Writing and Literature, publisher of The Southampton Review, director of the Southampton Writers Conference, and associate provost of the Southampton Graduate Arts Campus. He is not to be confused with detective novelist Robert Reeves (1912–1945).

== Publications ==
- Peeping Thomas - 1990
- Doubting Thomas - 1985
- Erotic Geography - 1984
- The Ridiculous to the Delightful: Comic Characters in Sidney's New Arcadia - 1974
