= Stony Brook Southampton =

Public university in Southampton, New York

- Former names: Southampton College, Long Island University
- Established: 1963
- Affiliations: Stony Brook University
- Chancellor: Carla Caglioti
- Provost: Robert Reeves
- Students: 350
- Location: Southampton, New York; 40°53′17.5″N 72°26′41.5″W
- Campus: 82 acres (330,000 m^{2})
- Colors: Blue, White
- Mascot: Wolfie

Stony Brook Southampton is a campus location of Stony Brook University, located in Southampton, New York, between the Shinnecock Indian Reservation and Shinnecock Hills Golf Club on the eastern end of Long Island.

== History ==
=== Southampton College, Long Island University ===
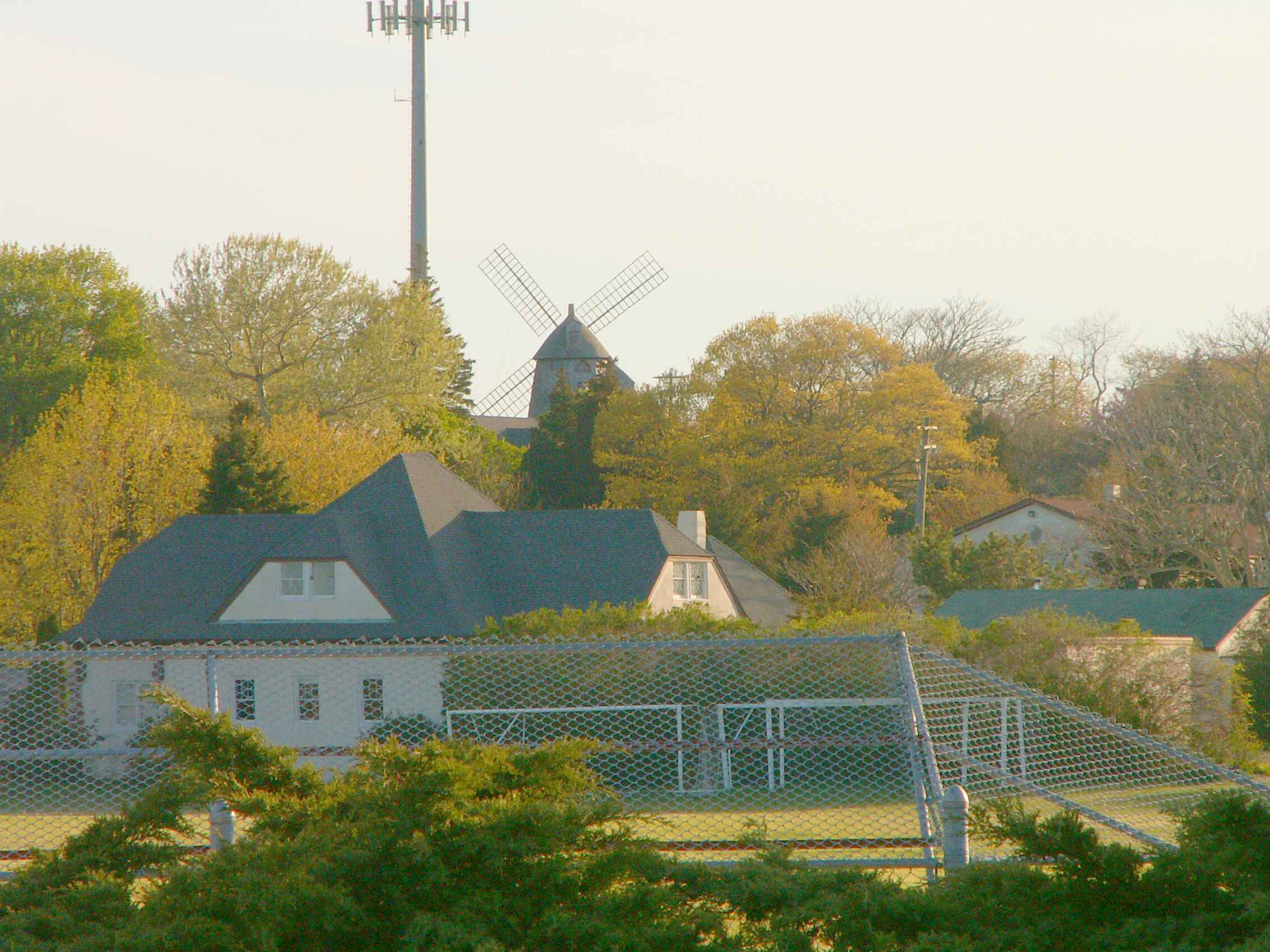
Southampton College in May 2006

Southampton College was founded in 1963 by Long Island University (LIU). It had its own station on the Long Island Rail Road until 1998 when the station was dismantled because it was lightly used.

From 1993, Robert F.X. Sillerman served as the Chancellor, replacing Angier Biddle Duke, ambassador to Spain under Lyndon Johnson. Sillerman took the job on two conditions: that the college scrap ill-defined liberal-arts programs and focus on marine science and creative writing, and that he lead publicity. He named Kermit the Frog as the 1996 commencement speaker: 31 newspapers picked up the story, creating a free marketing bonanza that raised the college's profile and drew hundreds of new admissions.

Refocusing on the marine science curriculum garnered the campus several accolades, including being named in 1998 as the Cousteau Society's sole North American Affiliate. In the course of the campus' tenure under Long Island University, it produced 34 Fulbright scholars, most of which hailed from the marine science program.

After many years of fiscal mismanagement, the University announced a multimillion-dollar capital campaign, launched a new interdisciplinary CORE curriculum and the construction of a new library to re-vamp the campus. After one year of a 10-year plan however, Long Island University officials ceased all plans, and Long Island University decided to effectively close the campus. This forced most students to either move to the University's Nassau County location, C.W. Post Campus or transfer elsewhere.

Although protests and advocacy, including a rally by the non-profit Save The College at Southampton and the student-led organization The Orphans of L.I.U., made numerous headlines with their actions, Undergraduate Programs ceased, and all but a few campus buildings were shuttered by the end of Summer 2005.

When Long Island University announced its plans to close the campus, in 2005 the Shinnecock Indian Nation filed a suit seeking return of 3,500 acres (14 km^{2}) including both the campus and the golf club. There were local concerns that either the land would be taken over by the Shinnecocks for a casino, or that the land would be used for a housing development in the Hamptons.

The undergraduate Marine Biology Department was moved to the control of Stony Brook University in Summer 2005, and from Fall 2005, the State University of New York (SUNY) began offering an undergraduate marine sciences program, with teaching and research facilities at the campus leased from LIU.

=== Stony Brook Southampton ===
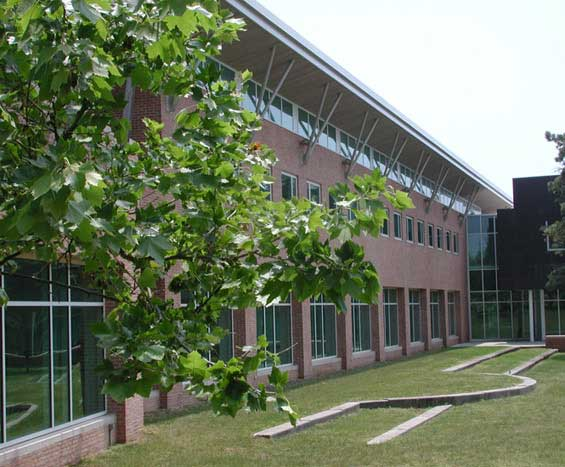
Chancellors Hall at Stony Brook Southampton

On March 24, 2006, SUNY announced a final agreement for the purchase of the 81-acre (330,000 m^{2}) Southampton College property from LIU. SUNY paid US $35 million for the 84-acre (340,000 m^{2}) campus and its waterfront facility for its famed Marine Biology Department, as well as the NPR-affiliated WLIU FM 88.3 radio station. In the agreement to take over WLIU, it states that the station is to continue its LIU affiliation and move from its broadcasting studios in Chancellors Hall by April 2010 to another location on Hill Street in Southampton. The station has an agreement to have its broadcast tower on the campus through 2024. The Mill Hill I windmill (1814) was moved here in 1890 from Mill Hill at Windmill Lane and Hill Street in Southampton. The Shinnecocks claim the land from Mill Hill to Shinnecock Hills Golf Club as land ceded them by treaty.

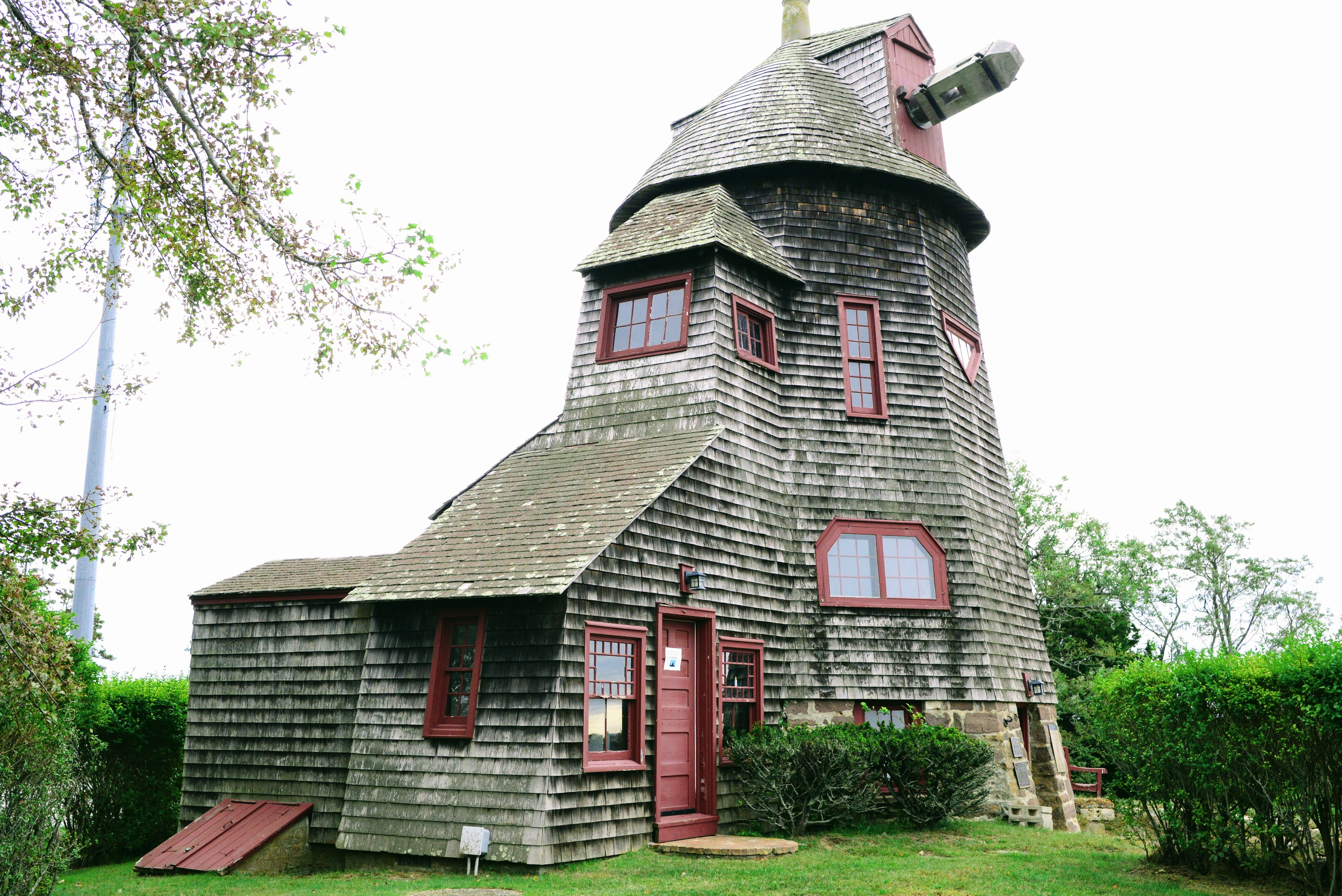
Southampton College Windmill cottage

In 1957 the playwright Tennessee Williams rented the 3-story windmill cottage and while there wrote "The Day on Which a Man Dies", a fictional play loosely based on his friend Jackson Pollock. The play languished after completion in 1960 in the college archives and was sold by Williams in 1970 to the University of California, Los Angeles. A new version re-written by the playwright in 1972 was performed in 2001; the first performance of the original in 2009 was presented by the Pollock-Krasner House and Study Center at the Ross School in East Hampton.

Under Stony Brook University's new ownership and starting with a class of 200 in August 2007, the campus featured an innovative curriculum devoted to issues of sustainability and the environment. Southampton's interdisciplinary academic programs focused on issues of ecological sustainability, with undergraduate majors in environmental studies; marine sciences; marine vertebrate biology; ecosystems and human impact; environmental design, policy and planning; and sustainability studies. A minor in business management with a focus on environmental sustainability was also offered through Stony Brook University's College of Business, and a five-year fast-track BA/BS-MBA program was also offered in partnership with the College of Business.

By the Fall 2010 semester, 800 students were registered. However, in April 2010, Stony Brook University President Samuel Stanley announced his decision to shut down the branch due to major state budget cuts and the need for better targeting of funds. The academic programs and students were relocated to the main campus. The undergraduate population staged letter campaigns to raise community awareness and protest the decision. Stanley came to the Southampton campus shortly after the decision to meet with the student body.

Six undergraduate students and a non-profit community group filed a lawsuit in NY State Supreme Court to block the closure of the college. The lawsuit was filed against Stony Brook and Stanley, claiming the decision to close the campus was procedurally illegal. On August 30, 2010, the court ruled that the university violated regulations and improperly closed the campus. The students won the lawsuit, but unable to contest financially due to the costs associated with instigating further litigation, agreed to a small settlement. They were permitted to complete their studies on campus, but not live there. Stanley visited each student's home to personally apologize.

As of 2015, the Stony Brook Southampton campus has grown and even prospered. Programs have been added back and the Board of Trustees of the State University of New York approved a long-awaited partnership agreement between Southampton and Stony Brook University hospitals that will ultimately result in a new Southampton Hospital on the Shinnecock Hills campus, a move that likely will bring the most activity those grounds have ever seen. In 2015, the Southampton campus also opened the Food Lab, for food-based education, innovation, and collaboration.

== Arts program ==
The Stony Brook Southampton Campus is a hub of the MFA program in Creative Writing and Literature through The Lichtenstein Center, undergraduate and graduate marine sciences, and health professions programs. All of the programs at The Lichtenstein Center are defined broadly to foster exploration of artistic expression in fields outside traditional program borders and to promote collaboration between disciplines in the creation of original work.

Interdisciplinary study, small class size, and one-on-one advising form the foundation of The Lichtenstein Center experience, where close student-faculty relationships are a priority. Students are offered practice in teaching, publishing or arts administration to further their real-world knowledge in the industry and also to gain admission to the Southampton Summer Arts Conferences. There are approximately 310 students currently enrolled.

Faculty includes Amy Hempel, Molly Gaudry, Christine Kitano, Marissa Levein, Robert Lopez, Julie Sheehan, Christine Vachon, Alan Kingsberg, Robert Reeves (author), Lou Ann Walker (author), Billy Collins, Emma Walton Hamilton, Matthew Klam, Susan Merrell (author), Genevieve Sly Crane, and L.B. Thompson.

=== Manhattan Track ===
Students accepted into the program may earn an MFA degree by combining coursework at the Manhattan facility and the Southampton campus during fall and spring terms, and at the Southampton campus during summer by participating in the prestigious Southampton Writers Conferences.

=== Southampton Writing Conference ===
Stony Brook Southampton also hosts the prestigious Summer Writing Conferences, which attracts renowned authors from around the world to teach and participate in creative writing workshops, which take place in two sessions throughout July. Remaining hours are devoted to lectures, readings, performances workshops, and panel discussions featuring faculty members and distinguished visiting authors, editors, publishers, and agents. Participants also enjoy a myriad of formal and informal social gatherings—author receptions, an open-mic night, breakfasts, lunches and dinners under the tents, and an issue launch of The Southampton Review.

== Young Artists and Writers Project ==
The Young Artists and Writers Project (or YAWP, formerly the Young American Writers Project) created by Stony Brook Southampton's MFA in Creative Writing and Literature Program, is dedicated to mentoring middle and high school students in the development of creative expression and critical thinking through writing. The YAWP curriculum sends professional writers and writing teachers into Long Island schools with a variety of innovative, inter-disciplinary writing workshops, including playwriting, screenwriting, poetry, personal essay, fiction, and visual arts. YAWP programs are offered throughout the school year and can be custom designed to fit the needs of an individual school. They can be offered in "push-in" format, as enrichment to creative writing, English, theatre or other academic classes, as extra-curricular programs or in retreat format. YAWP programs can be particularly effective for at-risk students, or for those who find writing and communications skills challenging in the traditional academic environment.

== School of Marine and Atmospheric Sciences ==
The SUNY School of Marine and Atmospheric Sciences (SoMAS) also operates on the Southampton campus. The primary focus of the SoMAS faculty and students is on fundamental research designed to increase understanding of the processes that characterize the coastal ocean and the atmosphere. The School of Marine and Atmospheric Sciences is also committed to researching solutions to problems that result from society's interactions with the environment. The Southampton location allows access to a variety of environments for research ranging from the open ocean to the waters of the largest metropolitan area in the United States, as well as the resources at the nearby National Weather Service, Brookhaven National Laboratory, and the Cold Spring Harbor Laboratory.

== Notable alumni ==
- Kent Washington (born 1956), basketball player
- Mike Wilhelm (NBA Assistant Coach)
