= Pakula =

Pakula or Pakuła (Polish pronunciation: [paˈkuwa]) is a surname. Notable people with the surname include:

- Alan J. Pakula (1928–1998), American film director
- Andrew Pakula (born 1957), American Unitarian minister
- Anna Pakuła-Sacharczuk (born 1956), Polish politician
- Irwin Pakula (1897–1988), American state senator for New York
- Martin Pakula (born 1969), Australian politician
- Iqbal Pakula (1977–2023), Indonesian actor
- Ronald Pakula, a fictional character on the science fiction series The X-Files, who prior to season 11, was only known as Deep Throat (The X-Files).

== See also ==
- Wilson Pakula, part of the election laws of New York
