= Joseph L. Pfeifer =

American politician (1892–1974)

Joseph Pfeifer
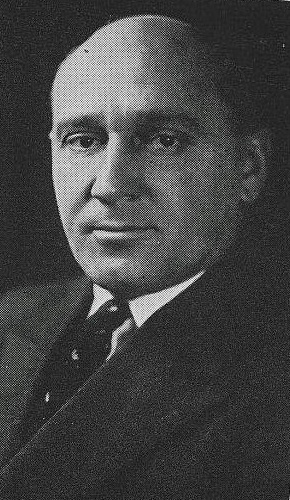

Member of the U.S. House of Representatives from New York
- In office January 3, 1935 – January 3, 1951
- Preceded by: George W. Lindsay
- Succeeded by: Victor L. Anfuso
- Constituency: 3rd district (1935–1945); 8th district (1945–1951)

Personal details
- Born: Joseph Lawrence Pfeifer; February 6, 1892 Brooklyn, New York, U.S.
- Died: April 19, 1974 (aged 82) Brooklyn, New York, U.S.
- Resting place: St. John Cemetery
- Party: Democratic
- Education: St. Francis College (BS); Long Island College of Medicine (MD)

Joseph Lawrence Pfeifer (February 6, 1892 – April 19, 1974) was an American physician and politician who served as a member of the United States House of Representatives for New York's 8th congressional district from 1935 to 1951.

== Early life and education ==
Born in Brooklyn, he attended St. Nicholas Parochial School, St. Leonard's Academy, and St. Francis College in Brooklyn. He graduated from Long Island College of Medicine in 1914 and was licensed to practice the same year.

== Career ==
He was a lecturer and author on surgical topics and during World War I he served on the medical advisory board, instructing medical officers going overseas.

=== Tenure in Congress ===
Pfeifer was elected as a Democrat to the Seventy-fourth and to the seven succeeding Congresses (January 3, 1935 – January 3, 1951).

A confidential 1943 analysis of the House Foreign Affairs Committee by Isaiah Berlin for the British Foreign, Commonwealth and Development Office stated that Pfeifer

Has a mixed record on foreign policy. He dissented on (1) lifting of arms embargo; (2) neutrality revision; (3) extension of conscription; (4) lifting of belligerent zones; but on other major issues of foreign policy, such as conscription, Lend-Lease (and the various appropriations for it) and the repeal of the ban on arming United States ships, he supported the Administration. Age 51. Internationalist.

=== Later career ===
Pfeifer was an unsuccessful candidate for renomination in 1950 to the Eighty-second Congress and resumed the practice of medicine.

== Personal life ==
He retired and resided in Brooklyn, where he died in 1974; interment was in St. John's Cemetery, Middle Village.

U.S. House of Representatives
Preceded by George W. Lindsay	Member of the U.S. House of Representatives from New York's 3rd congressional district 1935–1945	Succeeded by Henry J. Latham
Preceded by Donald L. O'Toole	Member of the U.S. House of Representatives from New York's 8th congressional district 1945–1951	Succeeded by Victor L. Anfuso
