= Senator Sweeney =

Senator Sweeney may refer to:

- James G. Sweeney (New York politician) (1905–1969), New York State Senate
- John James Sweeney (born 1927), Pennsylvania State Senate
- Mark Sweeney (politician) (1959–2022), Montana State Senate
- Patrick Sweeney (politician) (1939–2020), Ohio State Senate
- Stephen Sweeney (born 1959), New Jersey State Senate
- Thomas Sweeney (glassmaker) (1806–1890), Virginia State Senate
- Thomas Sweeney (politician) (1903–1973), West Virginia State Senate

== See also ==
- Joseph Henry Sweney (1845–1918), Iowa State Senate
