= Curley's Atlas Hotel and Baths =

Former hotel in Queens, New York

Coordinates: 40.5800°N 73.8373°W

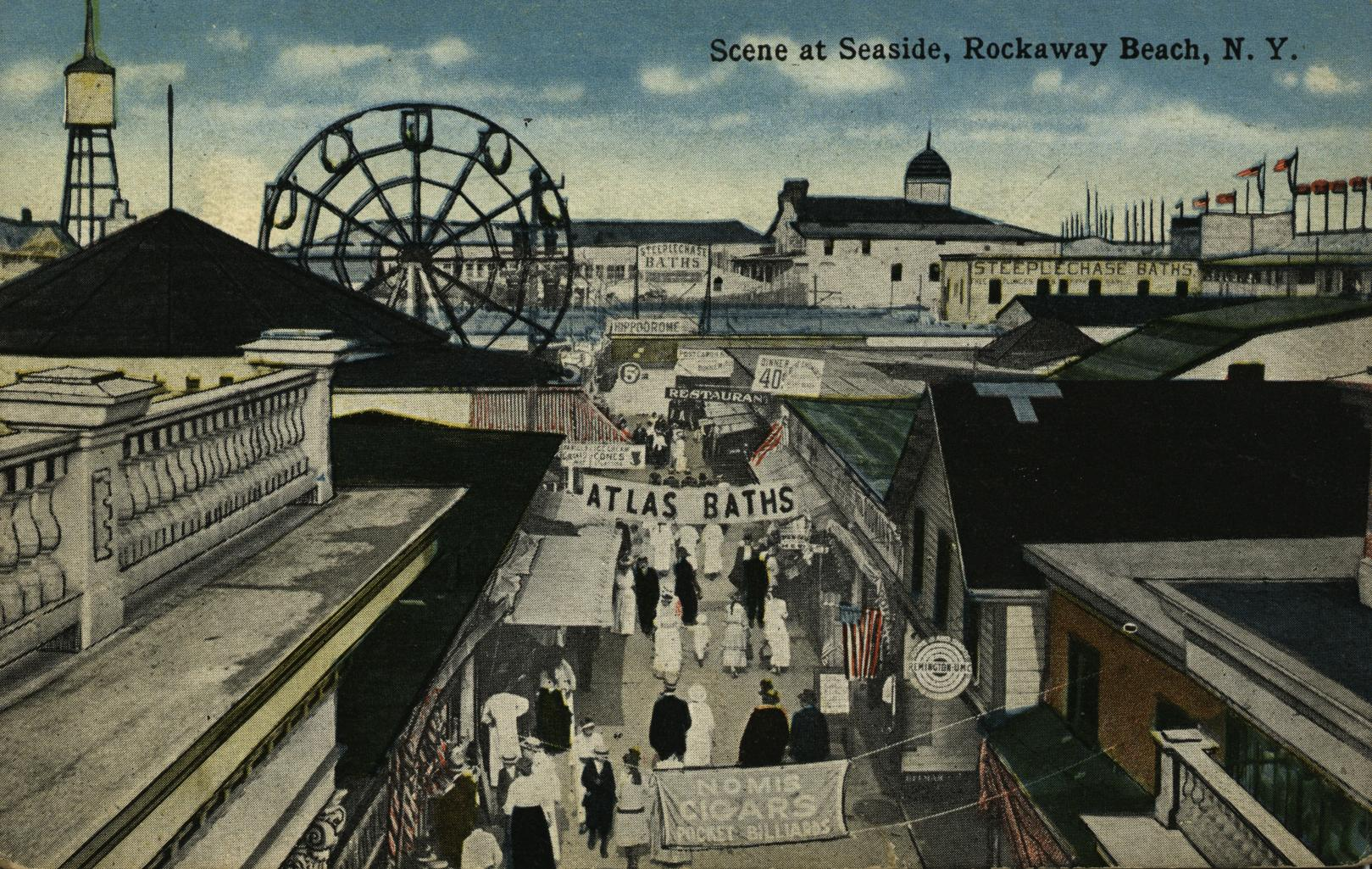
- 1919 postcard view

General information
- Type: Hotel
- Location: Queens, New York City
- Address: Beach 102nd Street (originally), Beach 116th Street (after 1900)
- Year(s) built: 1876
- Destroyed: March 31, 1968
- Owner: John J. Curley

Curley's Atlas Hotel and Baths was a long-standing institution in Queens, New York City. The hotel was founded in 1876 by John J. Curley on the beachfront at present-day Beach 102nd Street, in the neighborhood now known as Rockaway Beach or "Irishtown". The hotel was moved to its larger longer-lasting site at Beach 116th Street (then known as Fifth Avenue) in 1900.

Curley's remained extremely popular well past World War II, and was mentioned in a comedy routine by George Carlin as the place where he was conceived.

The hotel was destroyed by fire on March 31, 1968. After the fire, the lot remained empty for forty years.

== Sources ==
- Vincent Seyfried and William Asadorian, Old Rockaway, New York, in Early Photographs, Dover Publications, Mineola, NY, 2000.
- Kevin Boyle, Braving the Waves: Rockaway Rises and Rises Again, Rising Star Press, 2002.
