= Victor Anfuso =

American politician (1905–1966)

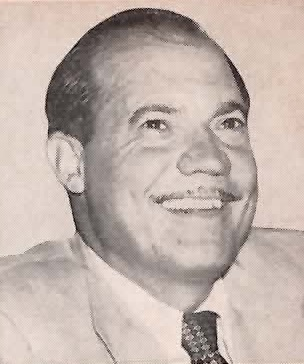

Member of the U.S. House of Representatives from New York's 8th district
- In office January 3, 1955 – January 3, 1963
- Preceded by: Louis B. Heller
- Succeeded by: John J. Rooney (redistricting)
- In office January 3, 1951 – January 3, 1953
- Preceded by: Joseph L. Pfeifer
- Succeeded by: Louis B. Heller

Personal details
- Born: Victor L'Episcopo Anfuso; March 10, 1905 Gagliano Castelferrato, Sicily, Italy
- Died: December 28, 1966 (aged 61) Manhattan, New York, US
- Resting place: St. John Cemetery, Queens, New York, US
- Citizenship: United States
- Party: Democratic
- Education: Brooklyn Law School
- Profession: Lawyer, politician, judge

Military service
- Allegiance: United States
- Branch/service: United States Army
- Years of service: 1943 until 1945
- Unit: Office of Strategic Services
- Battles/wars: World War II

Victor L'Episcopo Anfuso (March 10, 1905 – December 28, 1966) was an American lawyer, World War II veteran, and politician who served five terms as a Democratic member of the United States House of Representatives from New York from 1951 to 1953, then again from 1955 to 1963.

== Biography ==
Born in Gagliano Castelferrato, Sicily, the son of Salvatore Anfuso and Mariannina L'Episcopo, he immigrated to the United States in 1914. He attended Columbia University and graduated from Brooklyn Law School in 1927. He married Frances Stallone on June 15, 1930.

== Career ==
Anfuso served in the Office of Strategic Services in the Mediterranean Theatre of World War II from 1943 until 1945.

In 1950, Anfuso was elected to Congress and served from January 3, 1951, until January 3, 1953. He was the city magistrate of Brooklyn from February 1954 until his resignation in July 1954, when he was elected to Congress again and served from January 3, 1955, until January 3, 1963.

Anfuso was elected to the New York Supreme Court in 1962 and served in that capacity until his death in 1966.

Anfuso appeared in the first segment of To Tell the Truth on March 5, 1957, as an imposter of President Dwight D. Eisenhower's personal barber, Steve Martini.

== Death ==
Anfuso suffered a heart attack during a meeting at the Warwick Hotel and died soon after in Manhattan, New York, on December 28, 1966 (age 61 years, 293 days). He is interred at St. John Cemetery in Queens.

U.S. House of Representatives
Preceded by Joseph L. Pfeifer	Member of the U.S. House of Representatives from New York's 8th congressional district 1951–1953	Succeeded by Louis B. Heller
Preceded by Louis B. Heller	Member of the U.S. House of Representatives from New York's 8th congressional district 1955–1963	Succeeded by Benjamin S. Rosenthal
