= Louis B. Heller =

American politician (1905–1993)

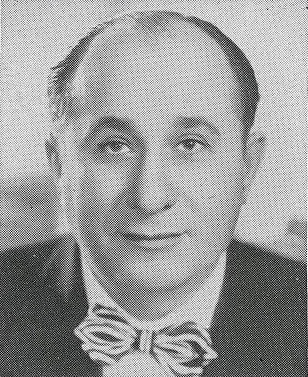

Member of the U.S. House of Representatives from New York
- In office February 15, 1949 – July 21, 1954
- Preceded by: John J. Delaney
- Succeeded by: Victor Anfuso
- Constituency: 7th district (1949–1953); 8th district (1953–1954)

Member of the New York State Senate from the 7th District
- In office 1943–1944
- Preceded by: Jacob J. Schwartzwald
- Succeeded by: William N. Conrad

Personal details
- Born: Louis Benjamin Heller; February 10, 1905 New York City, U.S.
- Died: October 30, 1993 (aged 88) Plantation, Florida, U.S.
- Resting place: Washington Cemetery in Brooklyn
- Party: Democratic
- Education: Fordham Law School
- Occupation: Attorney, judge

Louis Benjamin Heller (February 10, 1905 – October 30, 1993) was an American lawyer and politician who served three terms as a U.S. congressman from New York from 1949 to 1954.

== Life ==
He was born on February 10, 1905, on the Lower East Side in Manhattan. Heller was the second of four children of Max and Dora Heller. His parents had emigrated from Romania just a few years before the birth of their first child, a daughter named Freida.

Louis B. Heller graduated from Fordham Law School in 1926. He served as a special deputy assistant attorney general for cases of election fraud from 1936 until 1946. He was an appeal agent with the United States Selective Service from 1941 until 1942.

=== State legislature ===
He was a member of the New York State Senate (7th D.) in 1943 and 1944.

=== Congress ===
He was elected as a Democrat to the 81st United States Congress, to fill the vacancy caused by the death of John J. Delaney, and was re-elected to the 82nd and 83rd United States Congresses, holding office from February 15, 1949, until his resignation on July 21, 1954.

=== Judicial post ===
Heller resigned from Congress to become a Judge of New York City's Special Sessions Court, where he served until 1958. In December 1958 he was elected Justice of New York City's City Court, and he served until August 1966. He was elected to the New York Supreme Court in 1966 and served until his 1977 retirement.

=== Death ===
He died on October 30, 1993, in Plantation, Florida. He was buried at Washington Cemetery in Brooklyn.

== See also ==
- List of Jewish members of the United States Congress

== Sources ==
- United States Congress. "Louis B. Heller (id: H000460)". Biographical Directory of the United States Congress.

New York State Senate
Preceded by Jacob J. Schwartzwald	New York State Senate; 7th District; 1943–1944	Succeeded by William N. Conrad
U.S. House of Representatives
Preceded by John J. Delaney	Member of the U.S. House of Representatives from New York's 7th congressional district 1949–1953	Succeeded by James J. Delaney
Preceded by Victor L. Anfuso	Member of the U.S. House of Representatives from New York's 8th congressional district 1953–1954	Succeeded by Victor L. Anfuso
