= William N. Conrad =

American politician

Member of the New York State Assembly from the New York's 7th district district
- In office 1945–1946
- Preceded by: Louis B. Heller
- Succeeded by: Irwin Pakula
- In office 1949–1952
- Preceded by: Irwin Pakula
- Succeeded by: Carlo A. Lanzillotti

Personal details
- Born: August 17, 1889 Queens County, New York
- Died: December 2, 1968 (aged 79) Ridgewood, Queens, New York
- Party: Democratic
- Profession: Politician

William N. Conrad (August 17, 1889 – December 2, 1968) was an American politician from New York.

== Early life ==
He was born on August 17, 1889, in Middle Village, in Queens County, New York. He attended Public School No. 71, and Bushwick Evening High School. Later he became a public relations consultant.

== Career ==
In February 1937, he was co-opted as a member of the Board of Aldermen of New York City (59th D.), to fill the vacancy caused by the resignation of Joseph F. Mafera. At the end of the year, the Board of Aldermen was abolished, and was succeeded by the New York City Council. Conrad was a member of the City Council from 1938 to 1943.

He was a member of the New York State Senate (7th D.) in 1945 and 1946. In November 1946, he ran for re-election, but was defeated by Republican Irwin Pakula.

Conrad was again a member of the State Senate from 1949 to 1952, sitting in the 167th and 168th New York State Legislatures. In November 1952, he ran for re-election, but was defeated by Republican Carlo A. Lanzillotti.

In November 1954, Conrad ran for the New York State Assembly in the 3rd District of Queens County, but was defeated by Republican Charles T. Eckstein.

== Death ==
He died on December 2, 1968, in Ridgewood, Queens, New York City, of a heart attack.

== Sources ==
New York State Senate
Preceded by Louis B. Heller	New York State Senate; 7th District; 1945–1946	Succeeded by Irwin Pakula
Preceded by Irwin Pakula	New York State Senate; 7th District; 1949–1952	Succeeded by Carlo A. Lanzillotti
