= Juniper Valley Park =

Public park in Queens, New York

Coordinates: 40°43′13″N 73°52′49″W

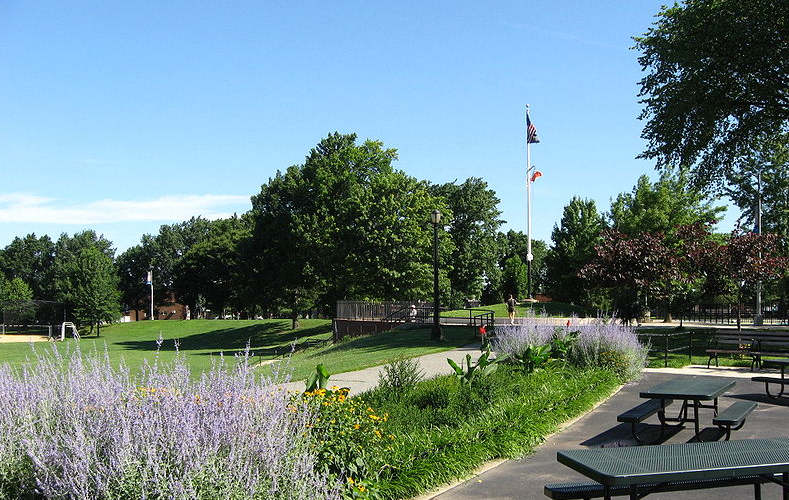
Juniper Valley Park, near Juniper Boulevard South, in Middle Village

Juniper Valley Park is a 55.247-acre (223,580 m^{2}) public park located within Middle Village, Queens, New York, United States. The park is bordered by Juniper Boulevard North on the north, Juniper Boulevard South on the south, Lutheran Avenue on the west, and Dry Harbor Road on the east; it is split into two parts by 80th Street.

The park contains tennis, handball, Paddleball, basketball and bocce courts, as well as seven baseball fields, and a quarter-mile running track around a turf football/soccer field. Since the 1930s it has been run and operated by the New York City Department of Parks and Recreation. The park is served by the Q29, Q38 and Q47 buses, which all stop near the park.

== Geology and ecology ==
The park occupies the central portion of what had been Juniper Swamp, a low-lying area formed by runoff from the melting of glaciers that created Long Island some 10,000 to 20,000 years ago. Before the 20th century, Juniper Swamp occupied an area bounded roughly by what are now 69th Street, Caldwell Avenue, 80th Street, and Juniper Valley Road. The post-glacial climate helped form peat bogs, the acidic nature of which was subsequently favored by flora unique to New York City as well as wild blueberry plants harvested by early settlers.

== History ==
=== Early years ===
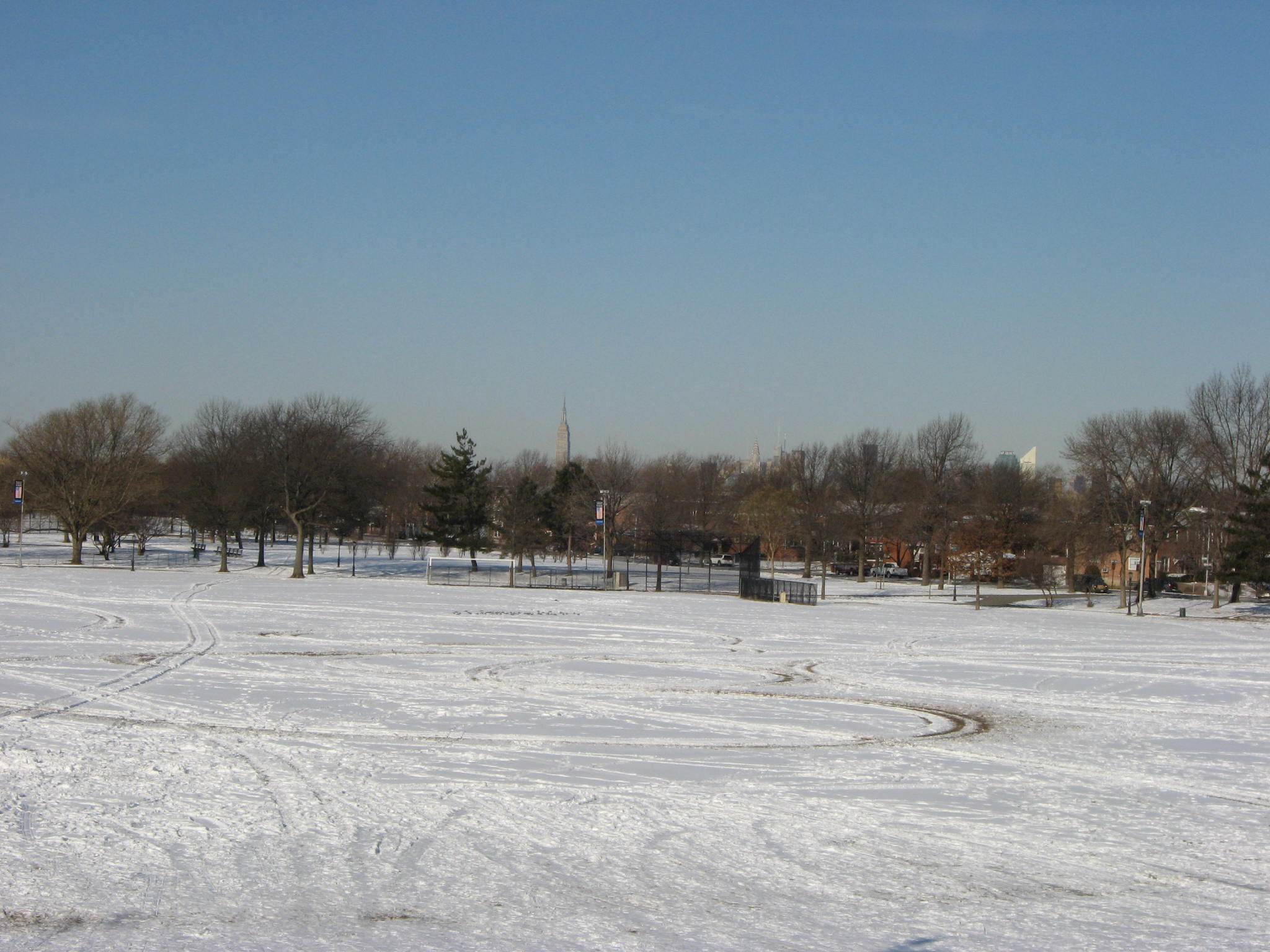
Juniper Valley Park in winter, facing west towards Manhattan.

During the American Revolutionary War in the 18th century, occupying British troops cut down most of the trees in the vicinity, and some of the swamp's peat was mined to burn for heat. White cedar and the opportunistic eastern red cedar, Juniperus virginiana, that subsequently took hold lent its name to the swamp. In what was perhaps the first recreational use of the area, during winter, the swamp's frozen ponds were a popular location for ice skating.

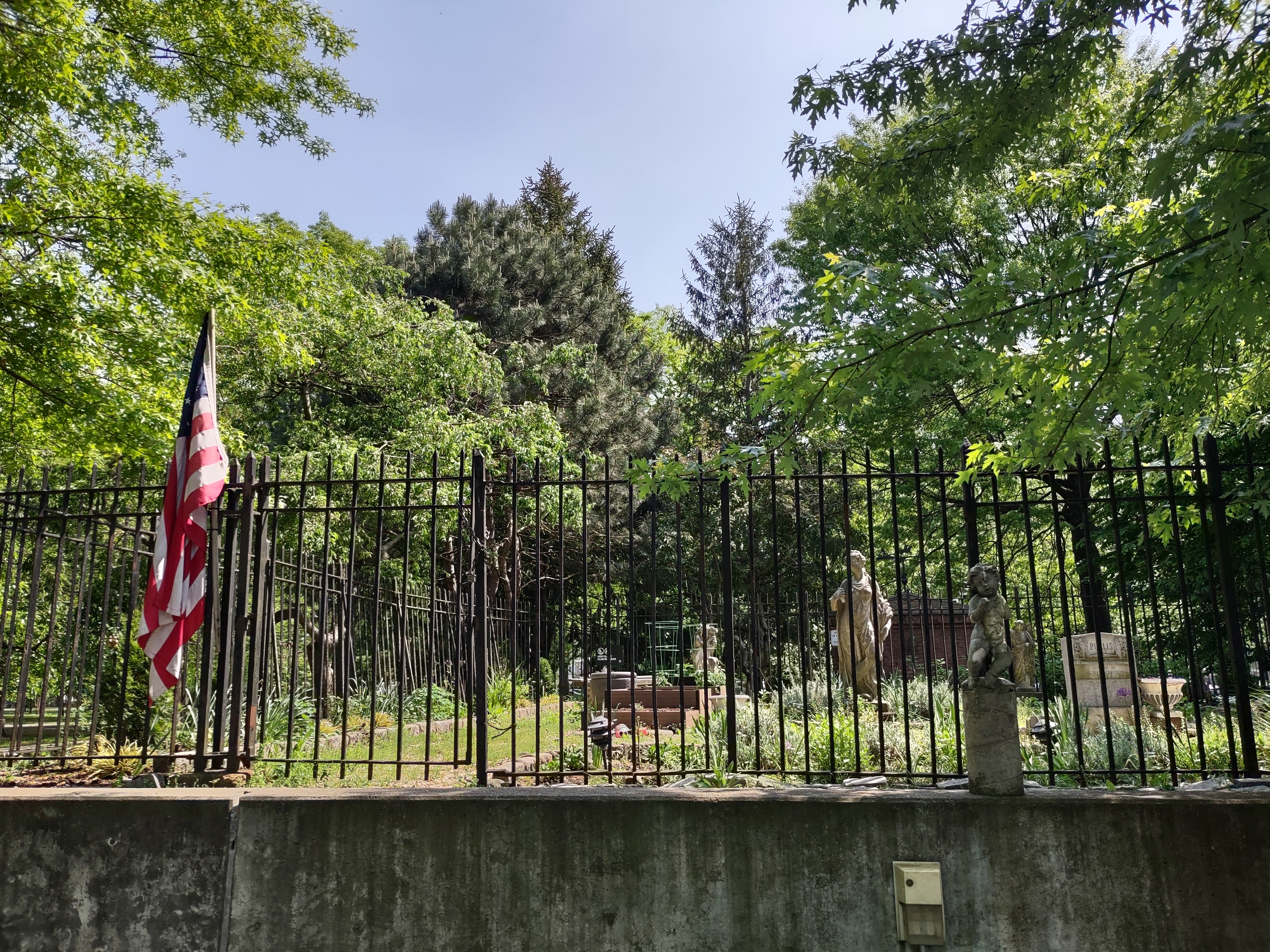
File:Pullis Farm Cemetery

In 1822, Thomas Pullis purchased 32 acres (13 ha) of land for farming at the eastern side of the swamp. The family cemetery he established by 1846 on its grounds remains today within Juniper Valley Park as one of the few surviving farm burial grounds in New York City.

In 1916, the New York Connecting Railroad carved a deep cut through the eastern side of the swamp to create a new railroad route. This drained much of the swamp's water. The railroad has marked the western edge of the park since then.

In the 1920s, the area of the swamp east of the railroad and west of what became the tennis courts was called Metropolitan Heights Fairground and was used as a race track for horses, dogs, automobiles and motorcycles. The track was .875 miles (1.408 km) in length.

=== Development ===
A key figure in the eventual transformation of the swamp into the park is Arnold Rothstein, a mobster. Rothstein is widely suspected of significant involvement in the throwing of the 1919 World Series, known as the Black Sox Scandal, and soon thereafter using his gains to purchase 88 acres (36 ha) of Juniper Swamp. In the 1920s, he tried to sell the swamp to New York City for use as an airport, but only after first attempting to increase its apparent value by constructing on it a phantom village of 143 homes that were little more than facades. Before Rothstein could unload the swamp, he was murdered in 1928.

In mid-1927, Herbert Hoover, the United States Secretary of Commerce, approved the creation of a "Fact-Finding Committee on Suitable Airport Facilities for the New York Metropolitan District". The Hoover committee identified six general locations in the New York metropolitan area where an airport could be built. The committee recommended Juniper Valley as the first location for an airfield. Its second choice was an existing airstrip on Barren Island in southeastern Brooklyn. The city's aeronautical engineer Clarence D. Chamberlin chose the Barren Island location because it was already dredged for marine traffic; it was close to Jamaica Bay, which would allow seaplanes to also use the airport; and it was city-owned, while the land in Middle Village was not. One of the members of Hoover's Fact-Finding Committee objected because Middle Village was located at a higher elevation with less fog, while Barren Island was more frequently foggy during the spring and fall. However, Barren Island was already flat, so an airport located there would be ready for use in less time than an airport built on the hills of Middle Village. The Barren Island airport ultimately became the Floyd Bennett Field.

In 1930, the Regional Plan Association proposed building an airport and civic center in Juniper Valley, on a 210-acre (85 ha) area bordering Maspeth and Middle Village. The RPA advocated for the site, stating that it was close to the New York Connecting Railroad, and with the addition of mass transit lines on the existing railroad, the civic center and airport would only be 15 minutes from Times Square. Further, the Triborough Bridge and Queens–Midtown Tunnel would provide road connections to the area via the Long Island Expressway. The plan was opposed by Queens borough president George U. Harvey, who did not want to build on land owned by Rothstein; Harvey instead preferred a site near Jamaica, further east in central Queens. In response, the RPA stated that the Juniper Valley site had already been identified by the Hoover committee as suitable for an airport.

In March 1931, New York City Comptroller Charles W. Berry suggested a competing proposal that would instead use Rothstein's land in Juniper Valley as a public park. The original plan was to acquire 84 acres (34 ha) at a cost of $475,000 (though the land was appraised at $624,375), but in August 1931, a revised plan was submitted that would acquire 73.25 acres (29.64 ha) at a cost of $418,551.50. New York City acquired Juniper Swamp at the rate of $5,700 per acre as settlement with the Rothstein estate for back taxes, and immediately tagged it for development as a public park. In 1935, the New York City Board of Estimate approved the purchase of 50 acres (20 ha) for Juniper Valley Park at a cost of $250,000. News of the park, coupled with improvements of Works Progress Administration (WPA) efforts, ushered in a wave of housing growth in the vicinity that continued through the 1960s. Not long after the park's creation was announced, developer Stewart Willey purchased 1,500 lots upon which he would develop houses. By 1938, eight developers were proposing to build 1,592 homes at a total cost of $8.75 million. The WPA started constructing houses in the area in 1941. To accommodate the new houses, Eliot Avenue was widened and extended to the Horace Harding Expressway (now Interstate 495).

In 1939, Sanitation Commissioner William F. Carey and Health Commissioner Dr. John L. Rice were indicted on charges of violating the New York City Penal and Sanitary Codes, specifically of "unlawfully dumping raw garbage and maintaining a public nuisance" and of "dumping under or on top of water, or on land, any refuse in which...offensive and unwholesome material is included." The charges were based on the operation of five city-run "garbage graveyards" in Queens, of which one was located in Juniper Valley. The others were the Edgemere Landfill; the Lefferts Dump at Lefferts Boulevard and Sunrise Highway (Conduit Avenue) in South Ozone Park, near the future site of JFK Airport; Bergen Landing; and the future site of Baisley Pond Park in South Jamaica. The owners of the Edgemere and Lefferts landfills were also named in the indictment. Carey and Rice, both cabinet members under Mayor Fiorello H. La Guardia, surrendered to the Long Island City Courthouse and were released without bail.

=== Renovations ===
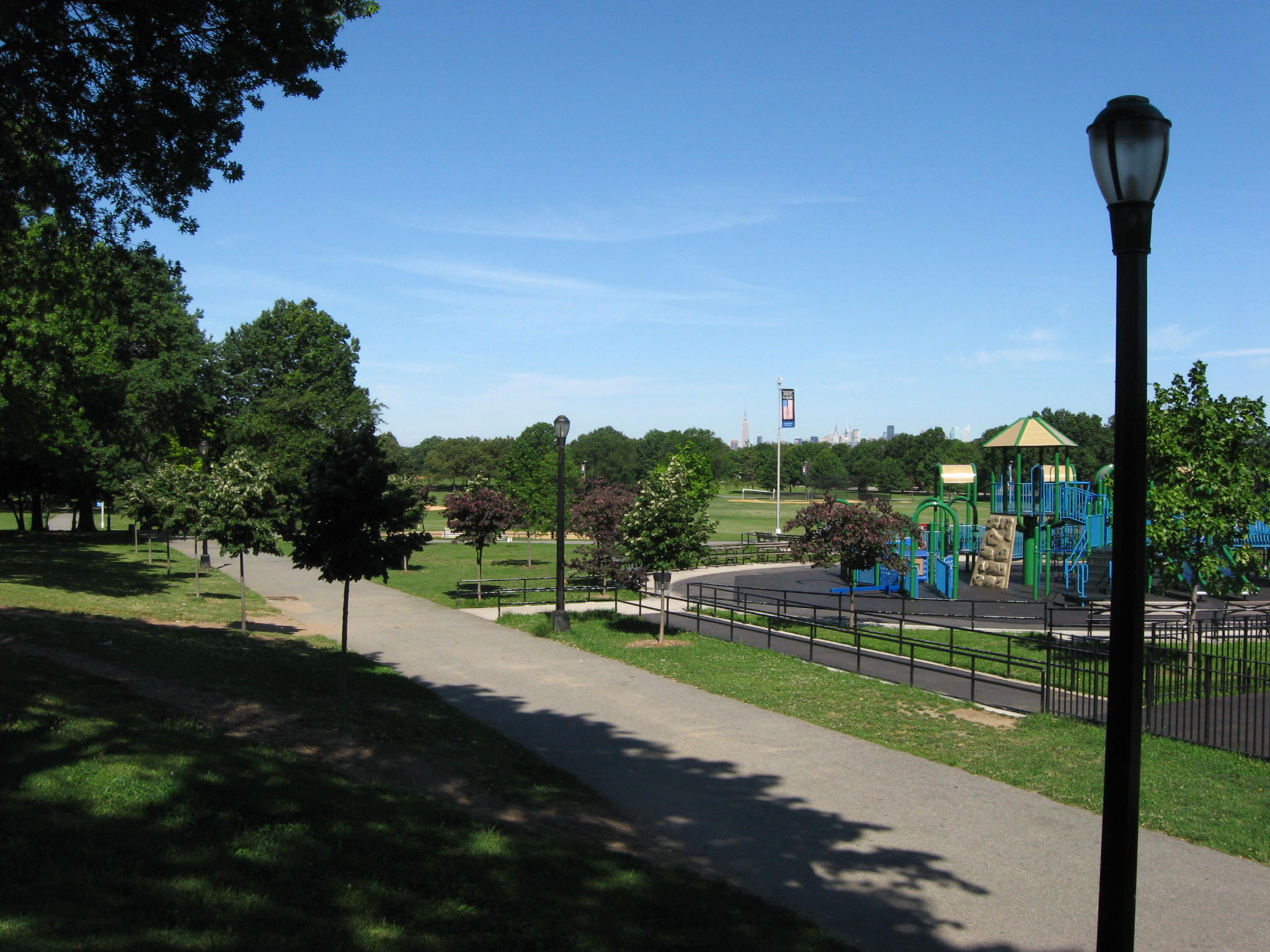
The playground (at right) in eastern Juniper Valley Park was renovated in 2006.

Briefly the swamp was again mined for peat to support road projects of New York City parks commissioner Robert Moses. By 1942 the Works Progress Administration had completed improvement efforts on the portion of the park east of 76th Street to include eight tennis courts, four baseball fields, handball courts, and a sprinkler/wading pool. The 55 acres (22 ha) park's western third was left in its original swampy condition except for some paved walking paths and simple lighting. The park would remain unfinished until 1967, with the addition of two parking lots, more baseball fields, a running track, and football/soccer field. A proposal for a swimming pool was fought vehemently by the Juniper Valley Civic Association, however.

In 1977, the parking lots were closed due to excessive noise at night. The lots were removed in the 1990s. Around 1997, funding for a roller hockey rink was allocated for Juniper Valley Park. Although the rink had been proposed during the early 1990s, there was controversy over where the rink should be installed within the park. The roller rink opened in 1999 at a cost of $600,000. The baseball fields were renovated, but this soon led to accumulations of ponding because of improper drainage.

In May 2001, the old worn-out cinder track around the Brennan field was replaced with a 400-meter all-weather rubber based track. The old concrete bleachers have been replaced with aluminum seating. The renovation project, costing $1,560,000, was funded by Thomas Ognibene, the Queens city councilman at the time. Between late 2013 and July 2014, the bocce courts were renovated.
