= Carlo A. Lanzillotti =

American politician (1911–1979)

Member of the New York State Senate from the 7th District
- In office 1953–1954
- Preceded by: William N. Conrad
- Succeeded by: James G. Sweeney

Personal details
- Born: Carlo Ascanio Lanzillotti; February 18, 1911
- Died: May 12, 1979 (aged 68)
- Party: Republican

Carlo Ascanio Lanzillotti (February 18, 1911 – May 12, 1979) was a Republican member of the New York State Senate.

== Political career ==
He was elected to the New York State Senate in 1952, the last Republican from western Queens to do so. He was a member of the State Senate (7th D.) in 1953 and 1954. He was defeated for re-election in 1954, 1956 and 1962.

== Legacy ==
He was a brother-in-law of Donato Antone, creator of the Harvey Wallbanger cocktail; grandfather of Christopher Lanzillotti, a New York Sun columnist and New York County Republican District Leader; and great-uncle of Paul Lanzillotti, an MBA admissions consultant, author and creator of the Business School Selector.

== Death ==
Lanzillotti is buried at St. Charles Cemetery, near Farmingdale, Long Island.

New York State Senate
Preceded by William N. Conrad	New York State Senate; 7th District; 1953–1954	Succeeded by James G. Sweeney
