= St. John Cemetery (Queens) =

Catholic cemetery in Queens, New York City

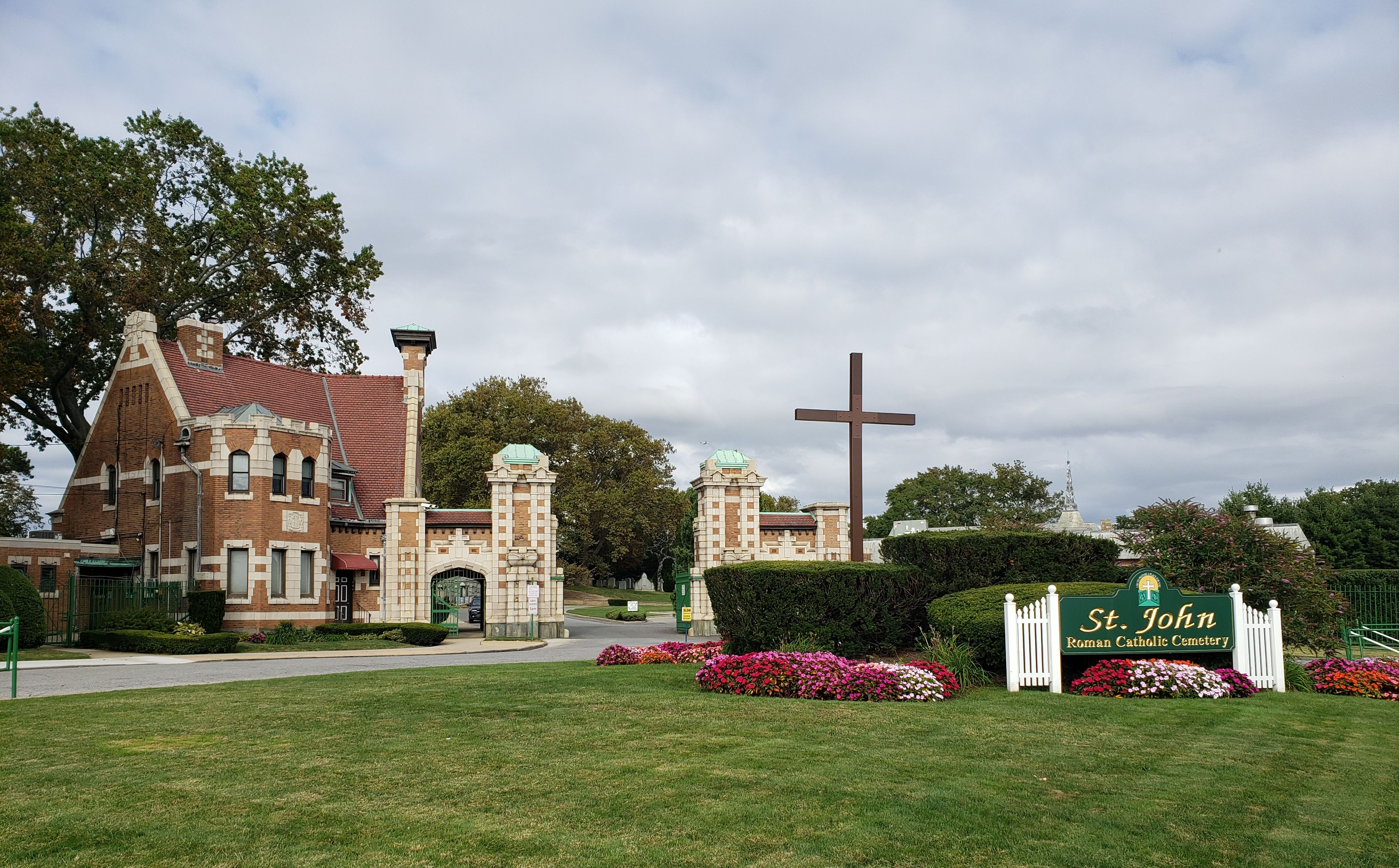
- The main entrance at Metropolitan Avenue & 80th Street
- Interactive map of St. John Cemetery

Details
- Established: 1879
- Location: Middle Village, Queens, New York
- Country: United States
- Coordinates: 40°42′54″N 73°52′01″W
- Type: Catholic Cemetery
- Owned by: Diocese of Brooklyn, Staffed by Catholic Cemeteries
- Website: St. John Cemetery

St. John Cemetery is an official Catholic burial ground located in Middle Village in Queens, a borough of New York City. Although it is mainly located in Middle Village, the southern edge of the cemetery runs along Cooper Avenue in Glendale. It is one of nine official Catholic burial grounds in the New York Metropolitan Area. St. John, along with St. Charles/Resurrection Cemeteries in East Farmingdale, Long Island, is among the largest cemeteries in New York State.

Since its opening, St. John has been the resting place of various famous and infamous people in New York City society, such as Mario Cuomo (1932–2015), Governor of the state of New York from 1983 to 1995, John F. Hylan (1868–1936), mayor of the city of New York from 1918 to 1925, Geraldine Ferraro (1935–2011), the first female vice presidential candidate representing a major American political party, Lucky Luciano (1897–1962), considered the father of modern organized crime in the United States, and John J. Gotti (1940–2002), the head of the New York City based Gambino crime family from 1985 to 2002.

Also buried here are fitness guru Charles Atlas (1893–1972), slain NYPD police officer Rafael Ramos (1974–2014), and photographer Robert Mapplethorpe (1946–1989).

== Notable burials ==
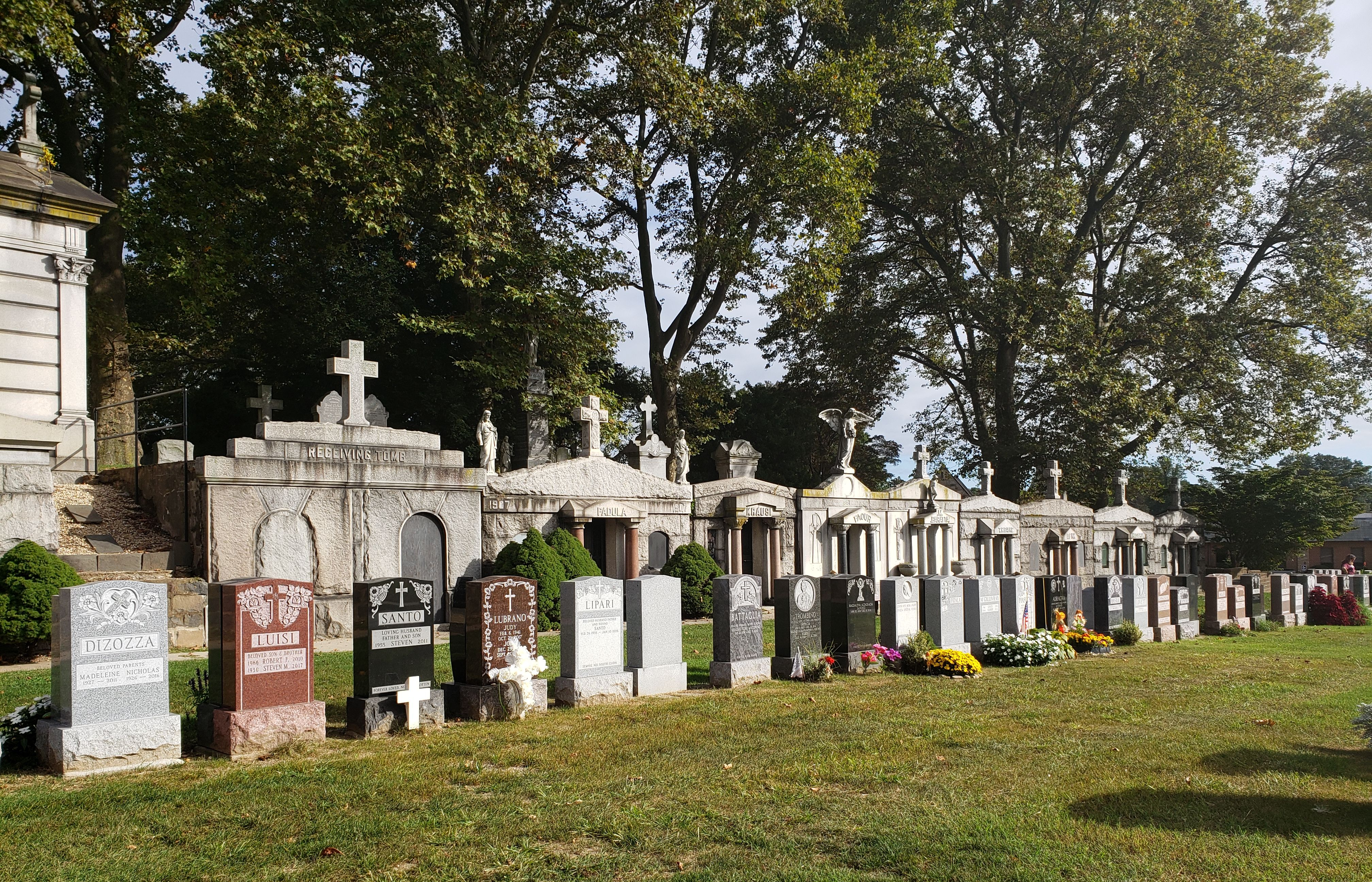
Row of graves at St. John cemetery

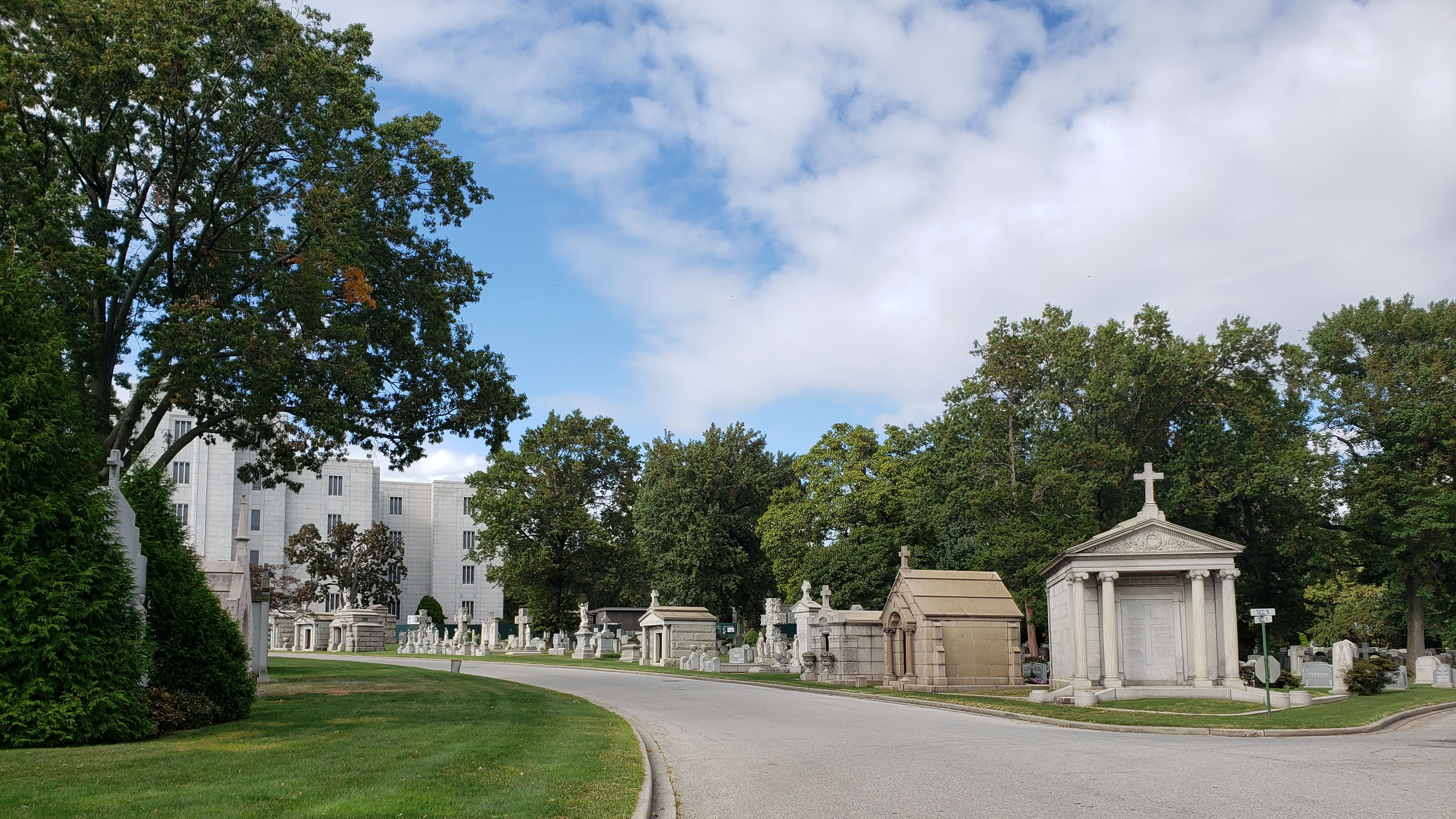
A view of the cemetery

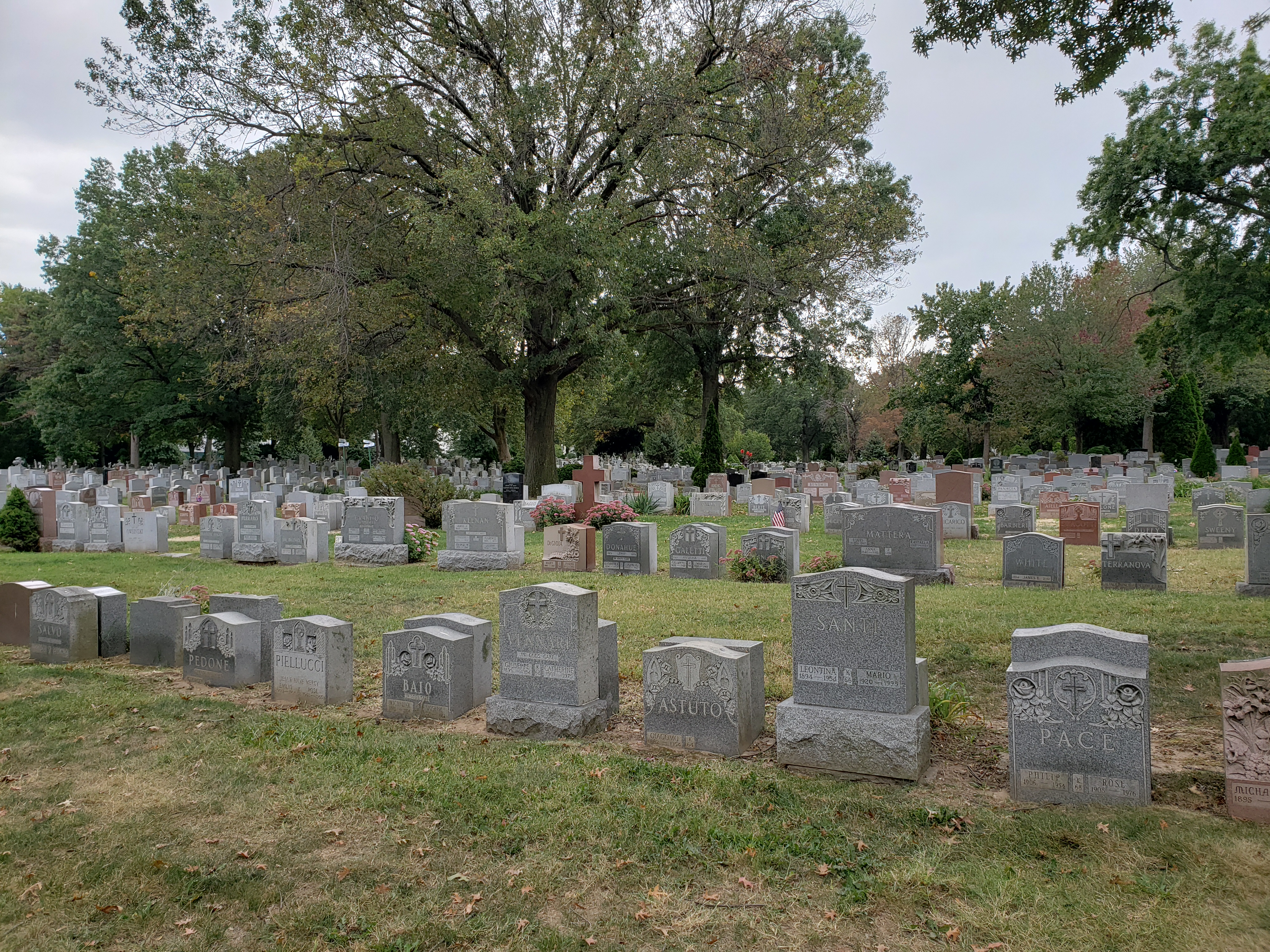
A view of the cemetery

=== Military members ===
- Medal of Honor recipients
  - William H. Morin (1868–1935), Spanish–American War
  - Patrick Reid (1875–1924), non-combat recipient
  - Louis E. Willett (1945–1967 †), Vietnam War

=== Organized crime members ===
- Frank Abbandando (1910–1942), "The Dasher"
- Charles "Lucky" Luciano (1897–1962), father of modern organized crime
- John Gotti (1940–2002), "The Teflon Don"
- Carlo Gambino (1902–1976)
- Joseph "Joe" Colombo (1923–1978)
- Salvatore D'Aquila (1878–1928)
- Aniello Dellacroce (1914–1985)
- Roy Albert DeMeo (1941–1983)
- John Dioguardi (1914–1979)
- Bill Dwyer (1883–1946)
- Carmine Fatico (1910–1991)
- John "Sonny" Franzese (1917–2020)
- Carmine Galante (1910–1979)
- Vito Genovese (1897–1969)
- Vannie Higgins (1897–1932), Prohibition-era mob boss and rum runner
- Wilfred "Willie Boy" Johnson, (1935–1988)
- Carmine Lombardozzi (1913–1992)
- Harry Maione (1908–1942)
- Salvatore Maranzano (1886–1931)
- Michele Miranda (1896–1973)
- James Napoli (1911–1992)
- Vincent Papa (1917–1977)
- Joseph Profaci (1898–1962)
- Philip Rastelli (1918–1991)
- Frank Tieri (1904–1981)
- Paul Vario (1914-1988)

=== Politicians ===
- Joseph Patrick Addabbo (1925–1986), US Congress
- Victor L'Episcopo Anfuso (1905–1966), US Congress
- Angelo J. Arculeo (1924–2013), New York City Council Minority Leader
- Louis Gary Clemente (1908–1968), US Congress
- Mario Cuomo (1932–2015), Governor of New York and father of Andrew Cuomo, Margaret I. Cuomo, Chris Cuomo and father-in-law to Kenneth Cole
- Geraldine Ferraro (1935–2011), US Congress and 1984 Vice Presidential candidate
- Joseph L. Pfeifer (1892–1974), US Congress
- John F. Hylan (1868–1936), Mayor of New York City from 1918 to 1925
- Felix J. Sanner (1867–1946), New York State Senate, 9th District

=== Others ===
- James McFarland (1927-2018), fireman
- Emile Ardolino (1943–1993), filmmaker
- Charles Atlas (1893–1972), body builder
- Carmine Infantino (1925–2013), comics artist and editor
- Robert Mapplethorpe (1946–1989), artist, photographer
- John P. McGarr (1964–2010), actor, movie producer
- James F. Sundah (1955 - 2026), songwriter
- Joe Pepitone (1940–2023), baseball player
- Vincent F. Seyfried (1918–2012), historian of Long Island
- Edward Payson Weston (1839–1929), professional pedestrian and celebrity
- Victims of the 1984 Palm Sunday massacre
  - Juan Enrique Lopez (1979–1984)
  - Noel Maldonado (1979–1984)
  - Alberto Maldonado (1978–1984)
  - Eddie Lopez Jr. (1977–1984)
  - Maria Isabel Perez (1973–1984)
  - Migdalia Perez (1969–1984)
  - Carmen Perez (1961–1984)
  - Virginia Lopez (1961–1984)
  - Virginia Lopez's 8-month-old unborn child
