= Louis Willett =

United States Army Medal of Honor recipient (1945–1967)

Louis E. Willett
- Born: June 19, 1945; Brooklyn, New York, U.S.
- Died: February 15, 1967 (aged 21); Kon Tum Province, Republic of Vietnam
- Burial place: St. John Cemetery, Middle Village, New York
- Military career
- Allegiance: United States
- Branch: United States Army
- Service years: 1966–1967
- Rank: Private First Class
- Units: Company C, 1st Battalion, 12th Infantry Regiment, 4th Infantry Division
- Conflicts: Vietnam War (DOW)
- Awards: Medal of Honor; Purple Heart

Private First Class Louis Edward Willett (June 19, 1945 – February 15, 1967) was a soldier in the United States Army who received the Medal of Honor posthumously for his actions during the Vietnam War as a member of Company C, 1st Battalion, 12th Infantry, 4th Infantry Division. Born in Brooklyn, New York, and raised in Richmond Hill, New York of Irish and French Canadian extraction, Willett was a graduate of Archbishop Molloy High School in Queens, New York, withdrew from SUNY Maritime College at Fort Schuyler, Bronx, New York in 1965, was drafted while working as a lineman for the telephone company.

== Medal of Honor citation ==
His Medal of Honor citation reads:

For conspicuous gallantry and intrepidity at the risk of his life above and beyond the call of duty. PFC Willett distinguished himself while serving as a rifleman in Company C, during combat operations. His squad was conducting a security sweep when it made contact with a large enemy force. The squad was immediately engaged with a heavy volume of automatic weapons fire and pinned to the ground. Despite the deadly fusillade, PFC Willett rose to his feet firing rapid bursts from his weapon and moved to a position from which he placed highly effective fire on the enemy. His action allowed the remainder of his squad to begin to withdraw from the superior enemy force toward the company perimeter. PFC Willett covered the squad's withdrawal, but his position drew heavy enemy machinegun fire, and he received multiple wounds enabling the enemy again to pin down the remainder of the squad. PFC Willett struggled to an upright position, and, disregarding his painful wounds, he again engaged the enemy with his rifle to allow his squad to continue its movement and to evacuate several of his comrades who were by now wounded. Moving from position to position, he engaged the enemy at close range until he was mortally wounded. By his unselfish acts of bravery, PFC Willett insured the withdrawal of his comrades to the company position, saving their lives at the cost of his life. PFC Willett's valorous actions were in keeping with the highest traditions of the U.S. Army and reflect great credit upon himself and the Armed Forces of his country.

== See also ==
- List of Medal of Honor recipients
- List of Medal of Honor recipients for the Vietnam War
