= Niederstein's =

Defunct restaurant in New York City

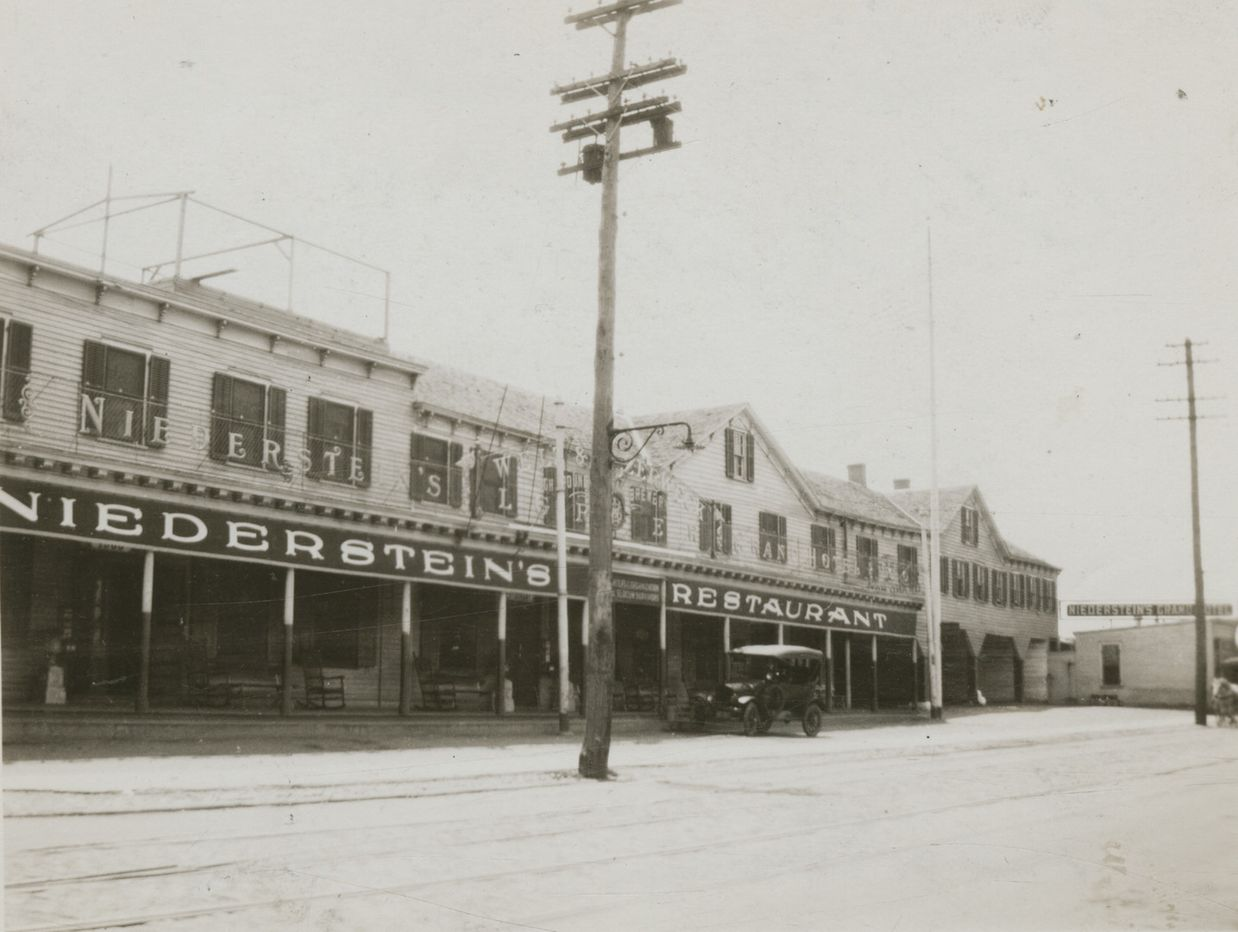
- Niederstein's Hotel and Restaurant in 1922
- Interactive map of Niederstein's

Restaurant information
- Closed: February 2005
- Location: 69-16 Metropolitan Avenue, Middle Village, New York, United States
- Coordinates: 40°42′44″N 73°53′08″W

Niederstein's was a German restaurant located in the Middle Village neighborhood of Queens in New York City that operated from 1850s until February 2005.

The restaurant started out in 1850 as a roadhouse on the road between Williamsburg, Brooklyn and Jamaica, Queens. After the acquisition by the German American Niederstein family in 1888, the restaurant and hotel attracted visitors of the neighboring Lutheran Cemetery. In the 20th century, restaurant solidified its status as a staple of the once heavily ethnically German neighborhood.

Niederstein's went out of business in 2005, with the building razed and an Arby's location and a small shopping center erected in its place..

== History ==
=== Early history ===
In 1850s, a lot amounting to 7/12 acre (0.24 ha) at the intersection of Williamsburgh & Jamaica Turnpike (Metropolitan Avenue) and Juniper Avenue (69th Street) belonged to the local tradesman Isaac Ferguson. Due to the prime value of the site overlooking the roadway between Williamsburg, Brooklyn and Jamaica, Queens, Ferguson turned down the offer of Frederick W. Geissenhainer, who had established the Lutheran Cemetery in the area in 1850s after the 1847 Rural Cemetery Act outlawed creating new graveyards in Manhattan. Instead, he sold a 1/3-acre (0.13 ha) parcel with the 169-foot (56 yd) frontage facing Turnpike to John Heuss for $1,500. Fergusson retained the ownership over a 1/4-acre (0.10 ha), 101-feet frontage lot to the west, only later on, in 1864, selling it to Heuss for $1,000.

Heuss, in turn, went on offering the lot to Henry Schumacher, a 27-year-old Wurtemberg-born saloon keeper who had sold his two establishments in Manhattan for $5,000 to acquire the parcel. In 1850, Schumacher founded Schumacher’s Lager Beer Saloon and Hotel, for which he had built a two-floor wooden building and where he soon moved with his wife Catharina.

Schumacher's establishment since witnessed a steady growth in patronage, as more people were moving to Middle Village, Long Island farmers traveling to Williamsburg to sell their produce generated reliable commercial traffic, and the Lutheran Cemetery caused the demand in graveside services. In 1868, Schumacher opted to expand at the expense of Heuss's quarter-acre lot then occupied by a graveyard and bought out the remains of the original Ferguson lot for $7,000, bringing the consolidated turnpike frontage of his property to 270 feet (90 yd).

=== Niederstein's ===
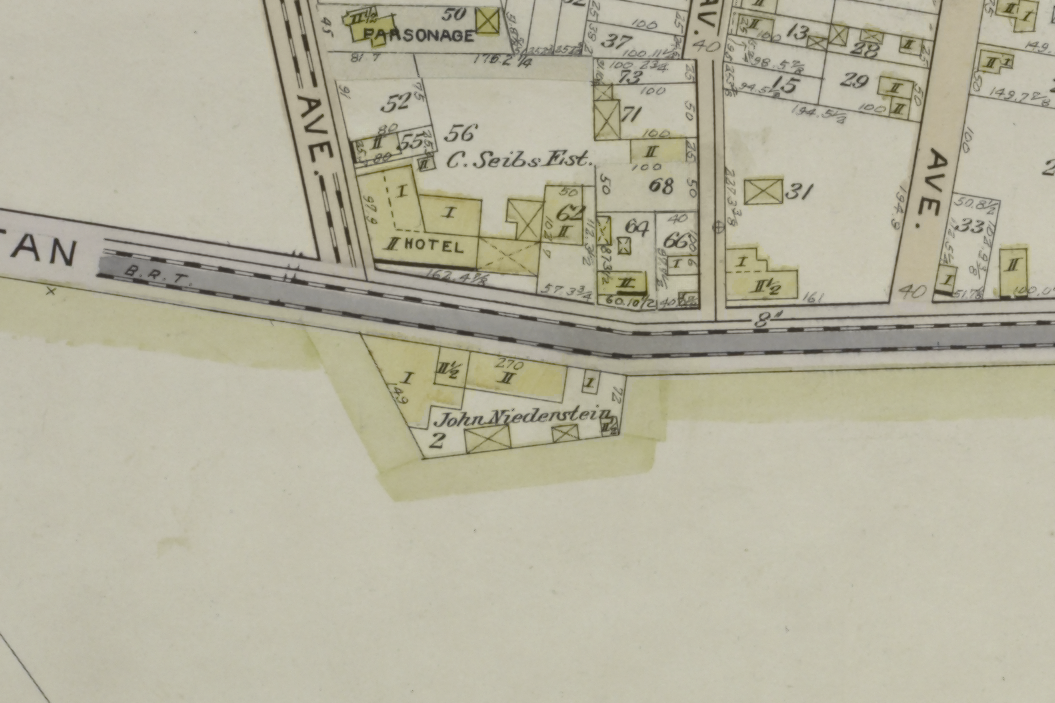
Niederstein's on the 1908 map from the Hyde Atlas of Queens

After Schumacher's death in 1880, the roadhouse was managed by his widow, later remarried to a graveyard owner John Sutter, and their children. In 1884, the city of Brooklyn established the Wallabout Market that diverted commercial traffic from Metropolitan Avenue to Myrtle Avenue. Quite possibly because of this Catharina Sutter moved to sell the business in 1888. The offer was taken up by John (Johan) Niederstein, a Bonn native who ran a saloon and hotel in New York (Manhattan) but opted to move his business across the East River. The deal worth of $28,000 was closed on May 24, 1888, with the deed, as per custom, transferred to John's wife, Apolonia, or Pauline, Niederstein.

Due to the change in Brooklyn's major commercial routes, the business took advantage of many cemeteries and graveyards in the area and shifted towards catering for the funeral processions. Besides, Niederstein set up a small zoo with a bear and monkeys for families' entertainment.

In March 1896 John Niederstein transferred active management of the restaurant to his eldest son John Niederstein Jr. while keeping his residence in the hotel.

=== Demise ===
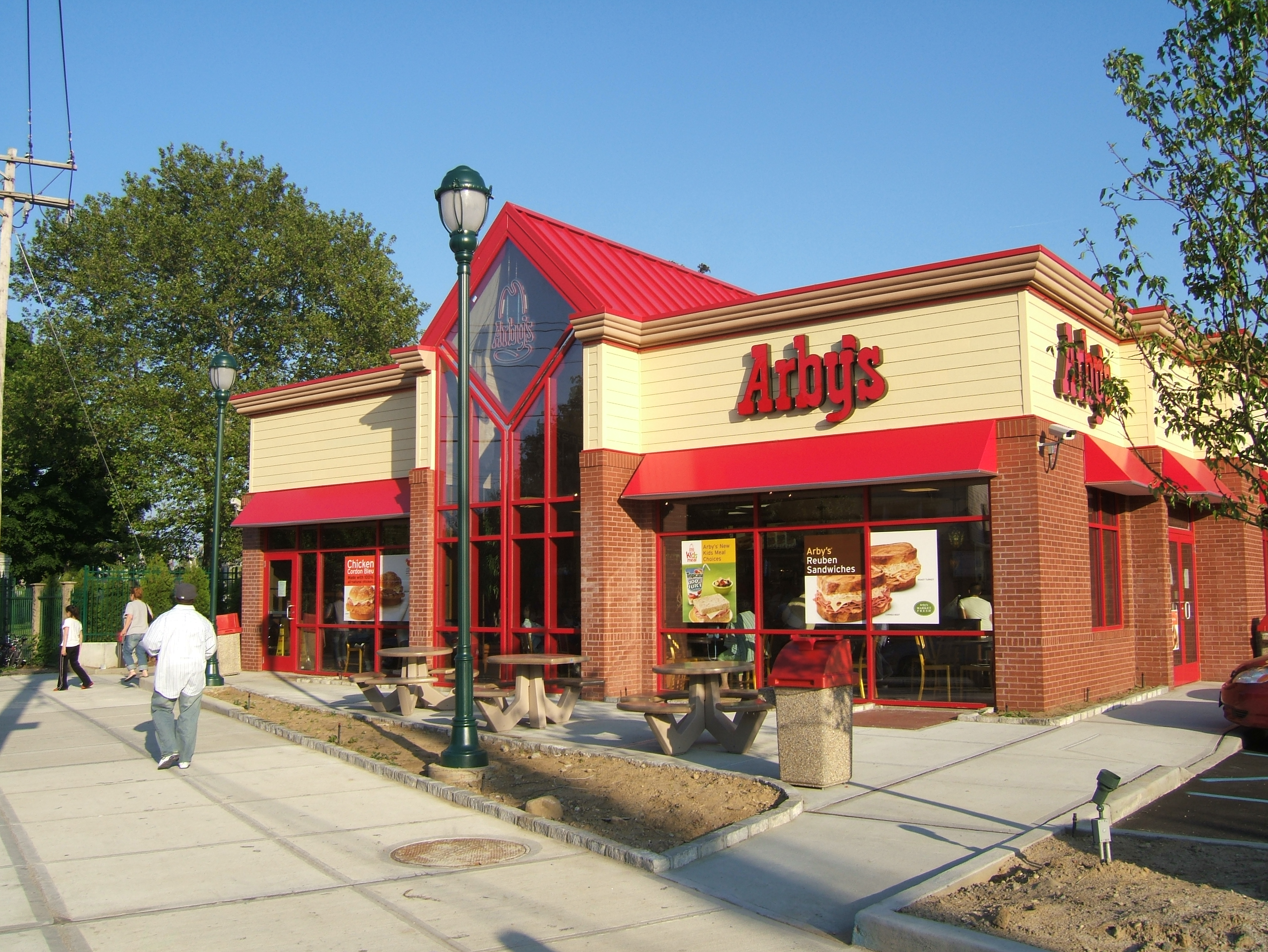
Arby's built on Niederstein's past site

The building was demolished in September 2005 and replaced with a fast-food restaurant and a small shopping center.
