= Vincent F. Seyfried =

American historian of Long Island

Vincent Francis Seyfried

Village Historian of Garden City, New York
- In office April 6, 1987 – April 20, 2006
- Preceded by: Mildred H. Smith
- Succeeded by: Susie Alvey

Personal details
- Born: April 18, 1918 Ridgewood, Queens, New York, U.S.
- Died: April 14, 2012 (aged 93) Nassau County, New York, U.S.
- Resting place: St. John's Cemetery, Queens, New York, U.S.
- Citizenship: American
- Spouse: Constance Goldsmith (m. 1955; died 1985)
- Education: Fordham University
- Occupation: Teacher; historian; author

Military service
- Allegiance: United States
- Branch/service: United States Air Force
- Years of service: 1941–1945
- Unit: 15th Air Force

Vincent Seyfried (April 18, 1918 – April 14, 2012) was an American teacher, author, World War II veteran, and historian. He is best known for his works on the history of Long Island, New York, New York City, and the Long Island Rail Road.

His work between 1950 and 2010 includes 11 books on trolley systems in Queens and on Long Island, 12 books on areas of Queens, a seven-volume set on the Long Island Rail Road, and a history of the founding of Garden City, where he served as Village Historian from 1987 to 2006. He provided many entries on Queens history for The Encyclopedia of New York City (1995).

== Biography ==
Seyfried was born in Ridgewood, (Queens, New York City) NY on April 18, 1918, and as a child lived in Hollis. After receiving bachelor's and master's degrees in classics from Fordham University in 1941, he was inducted into the Army in October 1941. After first being assigned for defense of the Panama Canal, in 1943 he qualified as a navigator in the Air Force. He flew 50 missions for the 15th Air Force based in southern Italy and was discharged 1945.

Following his discharge and again living in Hollis, Seyfried started civilian life as an English teacher, working at Martin Van Buren High School in Queens Village until his retirement in 1979. He married Constance Goldsmith in 1955, and in 1960 they moved 10 miles (16 km) east to the Village of Garden City, in Nassau County.

During his teaching career he spent his summer time researching an early interest in the trolley systems of Queens, which were being phased out in the late 1940s, and then historic parts of the Queens communities themselves. From his home in Garden City his interests expanded to the Long Island Rail Road, for which he provided a definitive history from its founding until 1919, and the trolley lines that ran on Long Island in the early 1900s. For the centenary of the Village of Garden City in 1969 he provided a book on its founding in 1869 until the formation of the Garden City Company in 1893. Seyfried served as the appointed Village Historian of the Village of Garden City from April 6, 1987, until April 20, 2006, preceded by Mildred H. Smith and succeeded by Suzie Alvey.

Seyfried was a frequent contributor to the activities of the Greater Astoria Historical Society in Queens, where a room is named in honor of his efforts. He also spent many hours at the Shore Line Trolley Museum in East Haven, Connecticut helping restore their rolling stock. He was a founding trustee of the Garden City Historical Society.

=== Later life and death ===
After his wife died in 1985 (they had no children) he continued his publishing until moving to assisted living facilities, due to declining health. He died four days shy of his 94th birthday in a Nassau County, New York nursing home, on April 14, 2012, from Alzheimer's Disease, and was interred at St. John's Cemetery, Middle Village (Queens).

== Publications ==
- The New York & Queens County Railway & The Steinway Lines 1867-1939 (1950)
- The Story of the Long Island Electric Railway and the Jamaica Central Railways 1894-1933 (1951)
- New York & Long Island Traction Company (1952)
- Jamaica Trolleys [The Story of the Jamaica Turnpike and Trolley Line] (1953) (reprinted 2002)
- Third Avenue Railway System - Roster of Equipment 1853-1953 (1953)
- New York & North Shore Traction Company (1955) (reprinted 2001)
- BRT Trolley Lines in Queens County [The Brooklyn Rapid Transit Company in Queens] (first edition, 1959)
- The Long Island Rail Road, a Comprehensive History - Part 1: South Side R.R. of L.I. (1961)
- The Long Island Rail Road, a Comprehensive History - Part 2: The Flushing, North Shore & Central Railroad (1963)
- The Long Island Rail Road, a Comprehensive History - Part 3: The Age of Expansion: 1863-1880 (1966)
- The Long Island Rail Road, a Comprehensive History - Part 4: The Bay Ridge and Manhattan Beach Divisions; LIRR Operation on the Brighton and Culver Lines (1966)
- The Long Island Rail Road, a Comprehensive History - Part 5: The New York, Woodhaven & Rockaway R.R.; the New York and Rockaway Beach Railway; the New York & Long Beach R.R.; New York & Rockaway Railroad; Brooklyn Rapid Transit Operation to Rockaway Over L.I.R.R. (1966)
- The Founding of Garden City 1869-1893 (1969)
- The Story of Queens Village (1974)
- The Long Island Rail Road, a Comprehensive History - Part 6: The Golden Age 1881-1900 (1975)
- The Cross Island Line - The Story of the Huntington Railroad (1976)
- Queens, A Pictorial History (1982)
- 300 Years of Long Island City 1630-1930 (1984)
- The Long Island Rail Road, a Comprehensive History - Part 7: The Age of Electrification 1901-1916 (1984)
- The Story of Woodhaven and Ozone Park (1985)
- The Story of Corona (Corona - from Farmland to City Suburb 1650–1935) (1986)
- Old Queens NY in Early Photographs (with William Asadorian) (1991)
- Elmhurst - from Town Seat to Mega Suburb (1995)
- A Long Island Academy - The Flushing Institute 1845-1901 (1997)
- Brooklyn Rapid Transit Trolley Lines in Queens (second edition, 1998)
- Old Rockaway New York in Early Photographs (with William Asadorian) (2000)
- Flushing in the Civil War Era 1837 to 1865 (2001)
- Wonderland of a Million Blooms - Flushing Cemetery (2003)
- The Rockaway Trolley - the Story of the Ocean Electric Railway 1886 to 1928 (2004)
- The Queens Boulevard Trolley - the Story of the South Shore Traction Company & the Manhattan & Queens Traction Corporation 1904-1937 (2008)
- North Beach - Vanished Pleasureland of Queens (2010)
