= Irwin Pakula =

American lawyer and politician (1897–1988)

Member of the New York State Senate from the 7th district
- In office January 1, 1957 – December 31, 1958
- Preceded by: James G. Sweeney
- Succeeded by: Seymour R. Thaler
- In office January 1, 1947 – December 31, 1948
- Preceded by: William N. Conrad
- Succeeded by: William N. Conrad

Personal details
- Born: December 4, 1897 Congress Poland
- Died: May 1988 (aged 90) Lake Worth, Florida, U.S.
- Party: Republican
- Education: DeWitt Clinton High School; New York University (BA); New York University School of Law (JD)
- Profession: Politician, lawyer

Irwin Pakula (December 4, 1897 – May 1988) was an American lawyer and politician from New York.

== Life ==
He was born on December 4, 1897, in Poland. The family emigrated to the United States when Irwin was still a child. He attended the public schools in New York City, and DeWitt Clinton High School. He graduated B.A. from the College of the City of New York, and J.D. from New York University School of Law. He practiced law in New York City, and entered politics as a Republican.

Pakula was a member of the New York State Senate (7th D.) in 1947 and 1948. In 1947, he co-sponsored, with Assemblyman Malcolm Wilson, the Wilson Pakula Act. In November 1948, he ran for re-election, but was defeated by Democrat William N. Conrad.

In November 1956, Pakula defeated the incumbent Democratic State Senator James G. Sweeney, and was again a member of the State Senate in 1957 and 1958. In November 1958, Pakula ran for re-election, but was defeated by Democrat Seymour R. Thaler.

He died in May 1988, in Lake Worth, Palm Beach County, Florida.

== Sources ==
New York State Senate
Preceded by William N. Conrad	New York State Senate; 7th District; 1947–1948	Succeeded by William N. Conrad
Preceded by James G. Sweeney	New York State Senate; 7th District; 1957–1958	Succeeded by Seymour R. Thaler
