= Steve Martini (barber) =

American White House barber

- Born: circa 1912; Greenville, Missouri
- Died: October 7, 1984; Boca Raton Community Hospital, Florida
- Occupation: Barber
- Spouse: Anne Martini
- Children: 3; Steve Martini Jr.

Steve Martini (born 1911 or 1912; died October 7, 1984) was a barber who cut the hair of United States presidents Dwight D. Eisenhower, John F. Kennedy, Lyndon B. Johnson and Richard Nixon. Beginning his career as a barber in the Pennsylvania Hotel in New York and moving on to The Pentagon, he began working in the White House in 1959.

== Early life ==
Martini was born in Greenville, Missouri. He moved to Washington in 1942, where he would live for around 28 years.

== Career ==
Martini began work in the barbershop of the Pennsylvania Hotel in New York. He later became a barber at the Pentagon with high security clearance, he cut the hair of general George C. Marshall, Army chief of staff during World War II, and other notable people.

In 1959, he was chosen by the Secret Service to cut the hair of President Dwight Eisenhower; they supposed that because Martini had not harmed Marshall, he would be trustworthy to cut the hair of the President. On occasion, he was called upon on occasion to cut John F. Kennedy's hair, doing so the day before his assassination in Dallas. He subsequently became the barber of Lyndon B. Johnson and then Richard Nixon. Martini's son, Steve, once swam in the White House swimming pool with Johnson. Martini collected envelopes of these presidents' hair clippings.

In 1971, Martini pleaded guilty to a charge of embezzling $15,000 from an estate for which he was trustee, as well as an income tax violation involving his employees' withholdings. He thus retired from Washington, and moved to Deerfield, Florida. When, after his presidency, Lyndon B. Johnson began to grow his hair longer, Martini said he phoned Johnson to tell him to get a haircut. In 1980 Martini was running a hotel hair-dressing salon in Boca Raton, Florida; when Ronald Reagan visited the city, Martini stood behind him for a time, and later told The Washington Post that Reagan did not dye his hair.

== Death ==
Martini died October 7, 1984, at age 72, at the Boca Raton Community Hospital in Florida. He was survived by his wife Anne as well as his three children, eight grandchildren and three great-grandchildren, and four siblings.
