= Wilson Pakula =

New York state political waiver

A Wilson Pakula is an authorization given by a political party to a candidate for public office in the State of New York that allows the candidate not registered with that party to run as its candidate in a given election.

The name refers to the Wilson Pakula Act of 1947, authored by state senator Irwin Pakula and then-assemblyman and future governor Malcolm Wilson, which forbids candidates from receiving the nomination of a political party if they are not registered as a member of that party, unless they receive permission to enter the primary from party officials representing a majority of the vote in the jurisdiction.

== Wilson Pakula Act ==
In the 1940s, both the Republican and Democratic parties in New York became concerned that members of other political parties, especially the American Labor Party (ALP), were engaging in entryism by running candidates in their party primary elections and winning the nominations. While Democrats and Republicans had won elections with the support of the ALP in the past, accusations of the party's ties to Communists and the increasing tension of the Cold War were making these alliances less desirable. It has been asserted that the law was targeted specifically at Congressman Vito Marcantonio of East Harlem who won the nominations of both the Republican and Democratic parties after joining the ALP.

New York Mayor William O'Dwyer advocated removing the influence of the ALP from the Democratic Party. After ALP candidates were successful in winning Republican nominations, Governor Thomas Dewey, who had run for district attorney with ALP support in 1937, turned against the party and sought to extricate the party from GOP primaries. On March 25, 1947, Dewey signed the Wilson Pakula Act into law. Its first target, Marcantonio, narrowly won re-election in 1948 running only on the ALP line, but was defeated in 1950.

Challenges to the law's constitutionality were denied in a number of cases in New York State. In Werbel v Gernstein (1948), the court held that "the Wilson-Pakula Law was designed to protect the integrity of political parties and to prevent the invasion into or the capture of control of political parties by persons not in sympathy with the principles of such political parties".

== In practice ==
The law states:

The members of the party committee representing the political subdivision of the office for which a designation or nomination is to be made, unless the rules of the party provide for another committee, in which case the members of such other committee, and except as hereinafter in this subdivision provided with respect to certain offices in the city of New York, may, by a majority vote of those present at such meeting provided a quorum is present, authorize the designation or nomination of a person as candidate for any office who is not enrolled as a member of such party as provided in this section.

Parties running candidates for the first time are exempt, as are judicial candidates and those chosen by a caucus of the party members.

Prior to the law's passage, candidates often ran in primary elections of multiple parties, creating a fusion ticket. Initially, it was thought that the law could end these fusion candidacies. However, in practice, it has allowed smaller parties in New York to remain relevant as candidates from the major parties often seek their endorsements to expand their appeal. This is largely because of the unusual New York practice of allowing a candidate to have his name on the ballot once for each party who nominates him and to have all the votes for him or her on whatever line added together.

A candidate that does not receive a Wilson Pakula but seeks to run in that party's primary election has the option of seeking an opportunity to ballot by circulating petitions in the same manner as any party member who seeks to challenge the designated party nominee in a primary. Primary candidates who run via the opportunity to ballot process cannot appear on the primary ballot and must run as write-in candidates. The Wilson Pakula and opportunity to ballot laws only apply to qualified New York political parties; for political organizations that do not meet that definition (for example, the Reform Party), there are no primary elections, and the first person to submit a valid independent nominating petition under a party name gets to use that line, regardless of that person's party registration.

While less common, Wilson Pakula certificates have been given by major parties as well. In 2008, Mayor Michael Bloomberg, who became an independent after winning two elections as a Republican, had to obtain a Wilson Pakula in order to run with the Republican nomination a third time. More recently, the New York Republican Party chairman, Edward F. Cox, spearheaded an effort to get a Wilson Pakula for Steve Levy, a Democrat, to run on the Republican line. His effort was unsuccessful as Levy received only 43% of the vote at the Republican state convention, short of the majority he needed. In 2017, Bo Dietl also sought the Republican Party line to run for New York City Mayor.

== Proposals to repeal Wilson Pakula ==
In April 2013, federal law enforcement officers arrested numerous New York City-area politicians. These included Democratic State Senator Malcolm Smith and Republican City Councilman Dan Halloran, who were charged with trying to bribe various Republican political leaders so as to get Smith onto the 2013 mayoral election ballot as a Republican. Also arrested were the Mayor of Spring Valley and local Republican party leaders. Governor Andrew Cuomo unveiled a bill to repeal the Wilson Pakula Act, as a way of addressing state corruption. The bill requires non-party member candidates to go through a petition process to use that party's ballot access.
