= James G. Sweeney (New York politician) =

American politician from New York (1905–1969)

Member of the New York State Senate from the 7th District
- In office 1955–1956
- Preceded by: Carlo A. Lanzillotti
- Succeeded by: Irwin Pakula

Personal details
- Born: 1905 Brooklyn, New York, U.S.
- Died: April 26, 1969 (aged 63–64) Brooklyn, New York, U.S.
- Party: Democratic
- Spouse: Emily Dieterichs
- Children: 2
- Occupation: Tax official, politician

James G. Sweeney (1905 – April 26, 1969) was an American politician and government official from New York City. He served as a member of the New York State Senate from 1955 to 1956, representing the 7th District in Queens. He later served on the New York City Planning Commission and as Deputy Commissioner of the New York State Labor Department.

== Early life and career ==
Sweeney was born in Brooklyn in 1905. He attended the City College of New York.

He began his career in public service in 1923, joining the New York City Tax Department. He was named Deputy Tax Commissioner in 1937, Assessor in charge of research in 1943, and Assessor in charge of the Queens tax office in 1946.

== Political career ==
Sweeney, a Democrat, was elected to the New York State Senate in 1954 and served a two-year term beginning in 1955, representing the 7th District in Queens.

During his time in the Senate, he was involved in local transit issues. In February 1956, he accompanied a committee from the Richmond Hill Taxpayers Association to meet with Transit Authority Chairman Charles L. Patterson to advocate for an extension of the IND subway line from the Liberty Avenue station to Rego Park, Queens.

== Later career ==
After leaving the Senate, Sweeney was appointed Deputy Commissioner of the New York State Labor Department in February 1957 by Industrial Commissioner Isador Lubin.

In 1960, he was appointed to the New York City Planning Commission, where he served until his death.

== Personal life and death ==
Sweeney was active in numerous civic and fraternal organizations. He served as chairman of the Queensboro Council of the Lighthouse for the Blind, a director of the Queensboro Society for the Prevention of Cruelty to Children, and a trustee of Wyckoff Heights Hospital. He was a member of the Knights of Columbus, the St. Vincent de Paul Society, and was a Past Exalted Ruler of Queensboro Lodge 878 of the Elks.

He was married to Emily Dieterichs. They had two daughters, Eileen Rebman and Patricia Scotland. He also had a brother, Francis, and a sister, Sara Monte.

Sweeney died on April 26, 1969, at Wyckoff Heights Hospital in Brooklyn after a long illness.

New York State Senate
Preceded by Carlo A. Lanzillotti	New York State Senate; 7th District; 1955–1956	Succeeded by Irwin Pakula
