= Middle Village, Queens =

Neighborhood in New York City

Middle Village
- Neighborhood of Queens
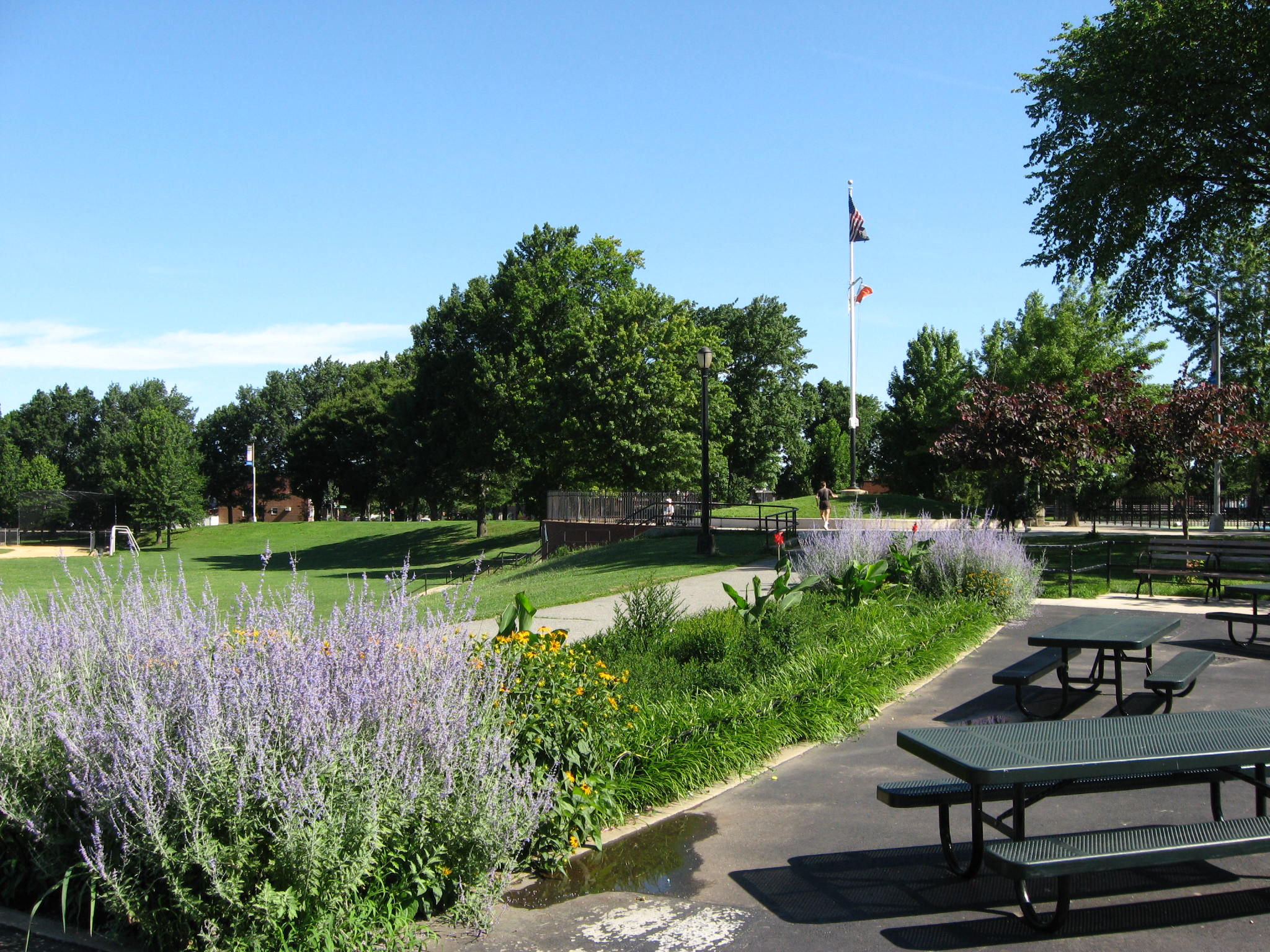
- Juniper Valley Park
- Interactive map of Middle Village
- Coordinates: 40.72°N 73.88°W
- Country: United States
- State: New York
- City: New York City
- County/Borough: Queens
- Community District: Queens 5

Population (2010)
  - Total: 37,929

Ethnicity
  - White: 74.2%
  - Black: 0.7%
  - Hispanic: 15.8%
  - Asian: 8.1%
  - Other/Multiracial: 1.2%

Economics
  - Median income: $67,715
- Time zone: UTC−5 (EST)
  - Summer (DST): UTC−4 (EDT)
- ZIP Code: 11379
- Area codes: 718, 347, 929, 917

Middle Village is a neighborhood in the central section of the borough of Queens, New York City, bounded to the north by the Long Island Expressway, to the east by Woodhaven Boulevard, to the south by Cooper Avenue and the former LIRR Montauk Branch railroad tracks, and to the west by Mount Olivet Cemetery. The small trapezoid-shaped area bounded by Mt. Olivet Crescent to the east, Fresh Pond Road to the west, Eliot Avenue to the north, and Metropolitan Avenue and Admiral Avenue to the south is often counted as part of Middle Village, but is sometimes considered part of nearby Ridgewood.

Middle Village is bordered by the neighborhoods of Elmhurst to the north, Maspeth and Ridgewood to the west, Glendale to the south, and Rego Park to the east. Housing in the neighborhood is largely single-family homes with many attached homes, and small apartment buildings.

Middle Village is located in Queens Community District 5 and its ZIP Code is 11379. It is patrolled by the New York City Police Department's 104th Precinct. Politically, Middle Village is represented by the New York City Council's 29th and 30th Districts.

== History ==
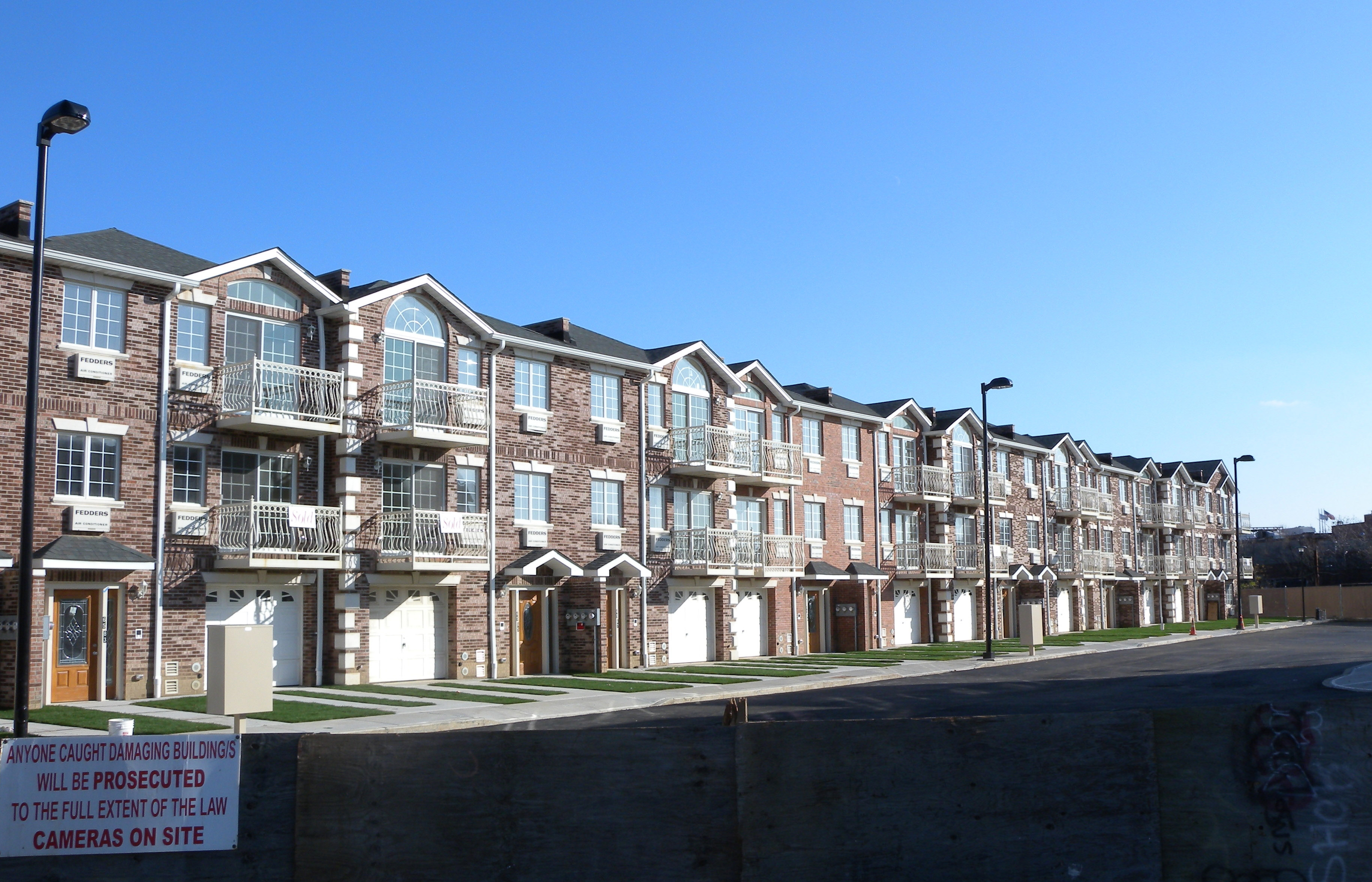
New housing

The area was settled around 1816 by people of English descent and was named in the early nineteenth century for its location as the midpoint between the then-towns of Williamsburg, Brooklyn, and Jamaica, Queens, on the Williamsburgh and Jamaica Turnpike (now Metropolitan Avenue), which opened in 1816. It was generally sparsely populated because the large Juniper Swamp was in the area. The swamp, an area where the Americans hid from British in the American Revolutionary War, was originally circumscribed by a "Juniper Round Swamp Road". In 1852, a Manhattan Lutheran church purchased the farmland on the western end of the hamlet.

After the Civil War, the area became predominantly German. The Williamsburgh and Jamaica Turnpike became an un-tolled road by 1873, and St. John Roman Catholic Cemetery was laid out on the eastern side of the town in 1879. Hotels and other services appeared to meet the needs of cemetery visitors. The western part of Middle Village was called "Metropolitan" until prior to World War I.

The Juniper Swamp was filled in 1915. In 1920, the area was renamed "Juniper Valley" as part of a revitalization project. Shortly after, gangster Arnold Rothstein bought 88 acres (36 ha) of the land, erected facades of houses on that land, and tried to sell these houses, but not before he tried to sell the land to the city as an airport.

A housing boom that began in the 1920s eventually consumed the surrounding farmland and became continuous with neighboring towns and neighborhoods. Originally, homes were built by two major builders—the Nansen Building Corporation, and Baier & Bauer. Charles Baier's first project in the area was the Parkville Homes in 1927, a group of 30 homes at Juniper Valley Road and 77th Place. With Ridgewood developer August Bauer, they built 150 single-family row houses by 1928. In 1931, Bauer, collaborating with builder Paul Stier, built some 7-room houses at 78th Street and Furmanville Avenue.

== Demographics ==
Based on data from the 2010 United States census, the population of Middle Village was 37,929, an increase of 300 (0.8%) from the 37,629 counted in 2000. Covering an area of 1,329.29 acres (537.94 ha), the neighborhood had a population density of 28.5 inhabitants per acre (18,200/sq mi).

The racial makeup of the neighborhood was 74.0% (28,071) White, 0.9% (354) African American, 0.1% (31) Native American, 8.1% (3,059) Asian, 0.0% (7) Pacific Islander, 0.2% (89) from other races, and 0.8% (314) from two or more races. Hispanic or Latino of any race were 15.8% (6,004) of the population.

The entirety of Community Board 5, which comprises Maspeth, Ridgewood, Middle Village, and Glendale, had 166,924 inhabitants as of NYC Health's 2018 Community Health Profile, with an average life expectancy of 81.4 years. This is about equal to the median life expectancy of 81.2 for all New York City neighborhoods. Most inhabitants are youth and middle-aged adults: 22% are between the ages of 0–17, 31% between 25–44, and 26% between 45–64. The ratio of college-aged and elderly residents was lower, at 8% and 13% respectively.

As of 2017, the median household income in Community Board 5 was $71,234. In 2018, an estimated 19% of Middle Village, Ridgewood, and Maspeth residents lived in poverty, compared to 19% in all of Queens and 20% in all of New York City. One in seventeen residents (6%) were unemployed, compared to 8% in Queens and 9% in New York City. Rent burden, or the percentage of residents who have difficulty paying their rent, is 46% in Middle Village, Ridgewood, and Maspeth, lower than the boroughwide and citywide rates of 53% and 51% respectively. Based on this calculation, as of 2018, Maspeth, Ridgewood, Middle Village, and Glendale are considered to be high-income relative to the rest of the city and not gentrifying.

The population in Middle Village has been historically German American. Later, it became Irish American, Italian American, and Yugoslavian-American, although Middle Village has seen an influx of Polish people, Eastern Europeans, Hispanic Americans, and Chinese Americans (mostly in South Elmhurst, after a ZIP Code change in the early 2000s). Many of the older families have left Middle Village but have not sold their homes but rather passed them down to their children; the result is many second and third generation residents. The population of Middle Village has been relatively consistent: 28,984 in 2000, compared to 28,981 in 1990.

== Points of interest ==
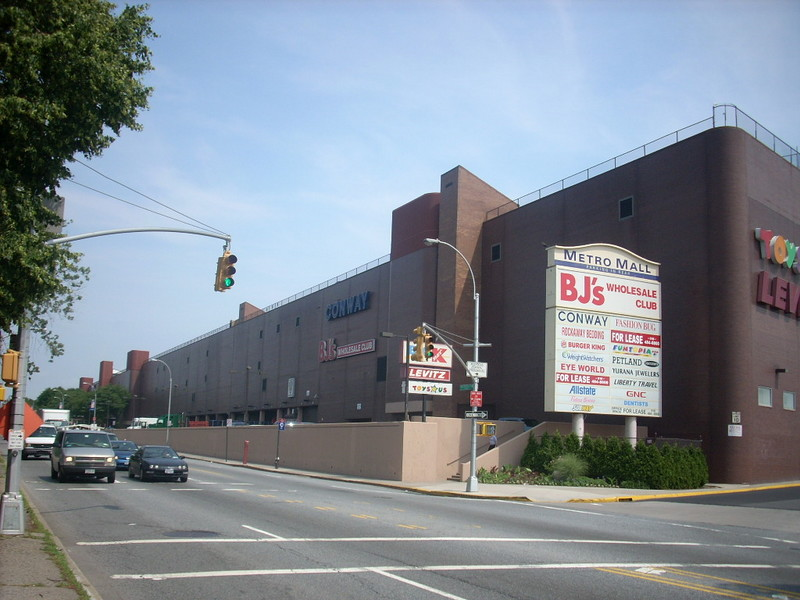
Metro Mall and Rentar Plaza pictured in 2007

Metro Mall is a tri-level shopping mall on Metropolitan Avenue just west of the neighborhood's subway station. In 1920, the C.B. French Company, which made telephone booths for the American Telephone and Telegraph Company (now AT&T), built a factory on what is now the site of Metro Mall. After the C.B. French Company was acquired by the Turner-Armour Company, which was in turn acquired by the Western Electric Company, Western Electric continued to operate the plant and make telephone booths for AT&T. The plant was closed by around 1965, after which United Merchants and Manufacturers Inc. acquired the land and built a three-story mall on the site between 1972 and 1974. In the 2010s, most of its tenants departed, most notably Kmart and Toys "R" Us which were both located inside two of the mall's anchor tenant spaces on level 2 (referred separately as Rentar Plaza), leaving BJ's Wholesale Club and Raymour & Flanigan. The now vacant level 2 was used as a storage facility by the New York City Department of Transportation (DOT) until 2023-2024, and Amazon leased space for a fulfillment center in 2020. The New York City Department of Corrections also has a training academy there. In 2024, Rentar Development Corp., the owners of the mall, announced that it would be rebranded as the Shops at Rentar Plaza.

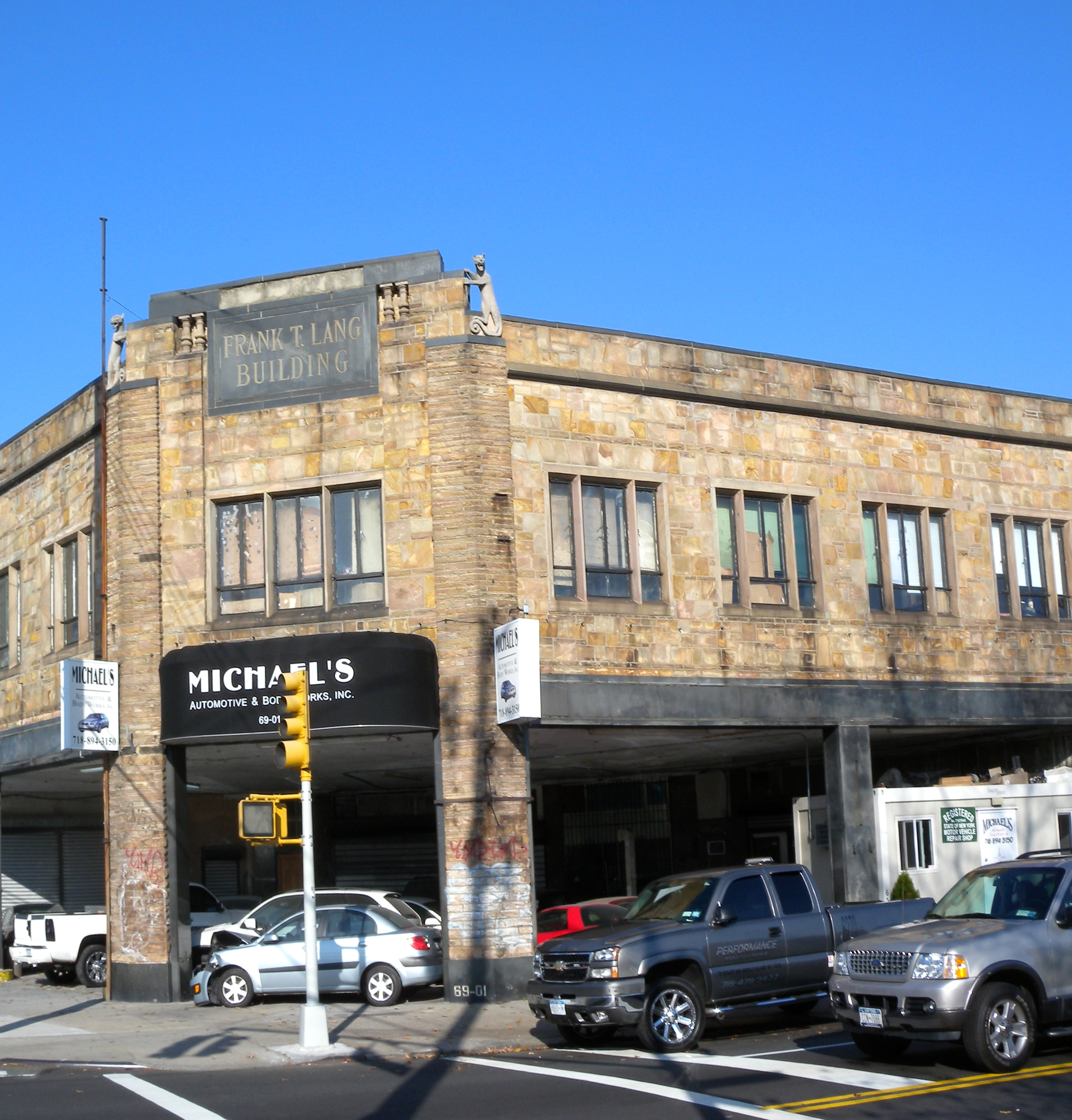
The Frank T. Lang Building at Metropolitan Avenue and 69th Street

The Frank T. Lang Building, at Metropolitan Avenue and 69th Street, was constructed in 1904. It is named after Frank Lang, who built mausoleums and monuments. The building, which sold mausoleums and monuments until 1946, also used to have an "H.C. Bohack" gas station, operated by the same man who also headed the Bohack grocery store chain. The two-story art deco building is notable for imposing gargoyles and finely chiseled faces on its roof.

Niederstein's, a renowned local restaurant, was located at 69-16 Metropolitan Avenue until it was demolished in 2005. The site, located near present-day 69th Street, was prime real estate in the early 19th century. Isaac Ferguson, who owned 7/12 acre (0.24 ha) of land at the site, sold 1/3 acre (0.13 ha) of his land to John Heuss, having been loath to give his land to the Geissenhainers of Lutheran Cemetery due to Ferguson's concerns that the tract was worth more than what the Geissenhainers would have paid for it. Huess later sold the land to Henry Schumacher, a then-27-year-old Württemberg native. In 1850, Schumacher built a 2-story wooden roadside lodge, called the Schumacher's Lager Beer Saloon and Hotel, on the Williamsburgh and Jamaica Turnpike. Ferguson sold the remaining 1/4 acre (0.10 ha) to Schumacher in 1864, by which time the area's hotels were booming in popularity. In 1888, Schumacher was dead and his wife, Catharina Sutter, sold the building and the business to John Niederstein, a German cook. Niederstein built 32 rooms with two wings and operated the lodge as a hotel. Henrietta Gabriel, John Niederstein's granddaughter, bought the business from Grace, Niederstein's daughter-in-law, in 1920. In 1969, Gabriel sold the hotel to Reiner and Horst Herink, who operated the structure as a restaurant. Once patronized by 130 thousand annual diners, the restaurant became less popular by the 1990s. Because of its many modifications, the building was ineligible for landmarking by the New York City Landmarks Preservation Commission. The property was sold in the early 2000s and demolished in September 2005 to make way for an Arby's restaurant.

The Arion Theater, a one-screen, 970-seat theater at Metropolitan Avenue and 74th Street, was built in 1921 and was the first theater in Queens that had wiring for loudspeakers. It closed in the mid-1980s because of a never-implemented plan to turn the structure into a triplex. As of 2016, the site is a Salvation Army location.

The Artistic Building, on Metropolitan Avenue between 79th and 80th Streets, is a 1930 structure that is notable for having friezes of biblical scenes on its facade. As of 2005, it was a tailor's shop.

There are also some very old houses in Middle Village. The Morrell House, built by English settler Thomas Morrell, was built in 1719 on present-day Juniper Valley Road; the house was demolished in 1985. By 1995, two other historical houses were slated for demolition by the same developer who demolished the Morrell House. In 2005, though, the Juniper Park Civic Association successfully petitioned to get parts of Maspeth and Middle Village rezoned to prevent aggressive redevelopment. An old farmhouse on Furmanville Avenue, built in the 1890s, still exists as of 2018.

=== Cemeteries and crematory ===
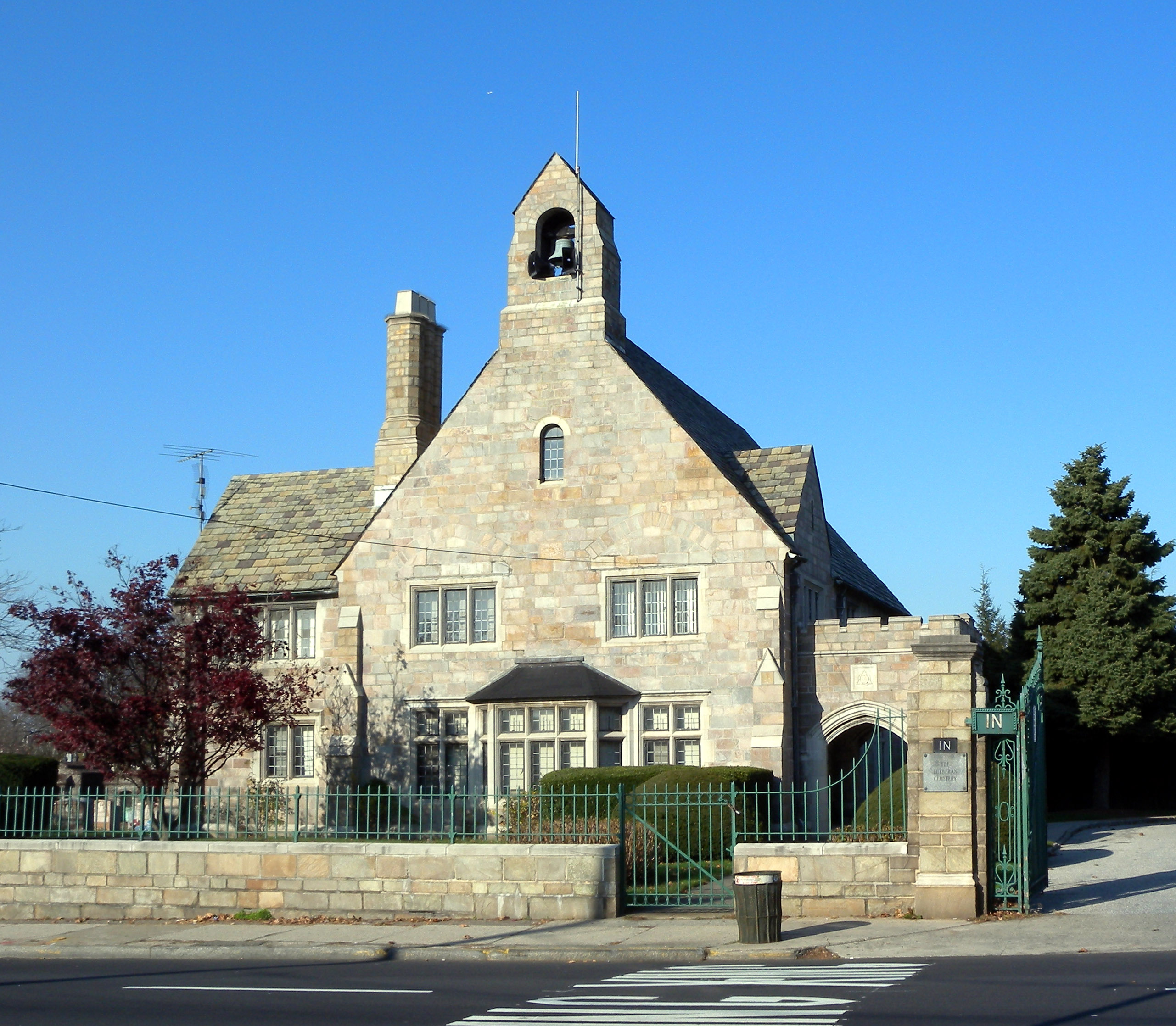
The gatehouse of Lutheran Cemetery

The Lutheran All Faiths Cemetery, at 67-29 Metropolitan Avenue, opened in Middle Village in 1852, due to the 1847 Rural Cemetery Act, which banned new cemeteries in Manhattan. The General Slocum Steamboat Fire Mass Memorial, commemorating the 1904 sinking of the PS General Slocum that killed 1,021 people, is at Lutheran All Faiths Cemetery. (Note: The Slocum monument is located at 40°42′33″N 73°52′52″W) The cemetery is also the burial place of Fred Trump and Mary Anne MacLeod Trump, parents of U.S. President Donald Trump.

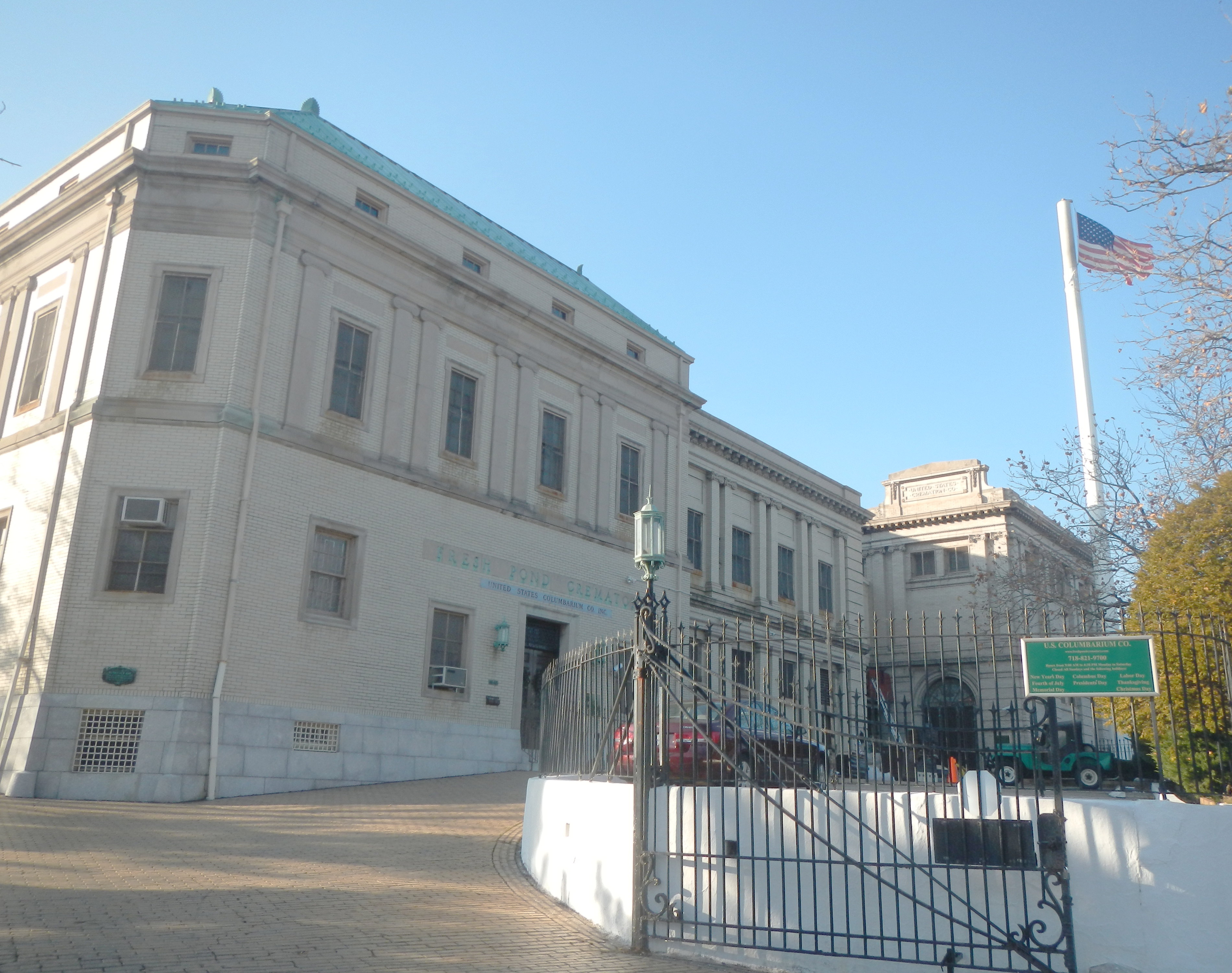
US Crematorium Company, formerly Fresh Pond Columbarium

Near the Lutheran All Faiths Cemetery, on Mount Olivet Crescent, is the Fresh Pond Crematory and Columbarium, which has operated since the late 19th century. Baseball player Lou Gehrig, screenwriter Ring Lardner, Sr., activist Leon Milton Birkhead, businessman J.P. Morgan, and Richard Hauptmann—notable for the Lindbergh kidnapping—are among the people cremated there. The crematory, the third-oldest in the United States, was erected in 1884 and started cremating people a year later. The columbarium was built in 1893 and expanded in 1898; the two-building complex was further enlarged in 1904 and 1910.

The Pullis Farm Cemetery, a small burial plot in Juniper Valley Park, is a gated mini-cemetery dating back to 1846. As many as eight members of the Pullis family are interred in the plot. The cemetery became overgrown was weeds and was restored in 1993–6 with a new headstone. It is one of the few farm burial grounds still located in New York City.

Many famous people's graves are located in Middle Village. St. John's Cemetery, a cemetery located in Middle Village, holds many famed mobsters, including John Gotti, Lucky Luciano, Joe Gallo, Carlo Gambino, Joseph Profaci, Joe Colombo, Vito Genovese and Carmine Galante. Also buried here are fitness guru Charles Atlas, politicians Geraldine Ferraro and Mario Cuomo, slain New York City police officer Rafael Ramos, and photographer Robert Mapplethorpe.

== Religious institutions ==
The United Community Methodist Church (founded as the Methodist Episcopal Church of Newtown), the first Methodist church in Middle Village, is located near the present-day intersection of Juniper Valley Road and 80th Street. The church, originally built in 1769, was moved to Metropolitan Avenue near 75th Street in 1836, and was rebuilt in 1901 and 1926.

The Trinity Lutheran Church was founded in 1851 in the Lutheran-All Faiths Cemetery. A school was founded in the church in 1861, and the church burned just two years later. Then, it moved to 69th Street. At the 69th Street site, the school burned down in 1895 and the church burned down in 1906. Another church was built on the 69th Street site, but it was structurally damaged by lightning damage in 1975 and completely burned in a 1977 fire. The church's third structure, built in 1979, is located on a plot of land bounded by present-day Penelope Avenue, Dry Harbor Road, Juniper Boulevard South, and 81st Street. The bells and cornerstones from the first two churches are the only remnants of the original structures, and are located in front of the original church.

St. Margaret's Roman Catholic Church, a church and attached school built in 1860, was used during the American Civil War as a temporary jail. The church and school were both reconstructed—the school in 1899 and the church in 1907. In 1935, they moved to a four-story structure on Juniper Valley Road near 80th Street.

Our Lady of Hope is a hexagonal structure on Eliot Avenue with a bell tower and is located just north of the New York Connecting Railroad. The church was built in 1965.

There used to be many synagogues in Middle Village, due to an influx of Jewish residents in the early 20th century. The Hebrew Institute of Middle Village was a rabbinical seminary, built in 1919 next to a synagogue that existed from 1909 to the 1970s; the building that housed the Hebrew Institute of Middle Village is now occupied by the Middle Village Adult Center. The Holy Archangels Michael & Gabriel Romanian Orthodox Church moved into a former synagogue in 1997, but the synagogue itself dates back to 1921. The only extant synagogue in the area, the Congregation of Forest Hills West, was founded in 1935.

== Police and crime ==
Maspeth, Ridgewood, Middle Village, and Glendale are patrolled by the 104th Precinct of the NYPD, located at 64-02 Catalpa Avenue. The 104th Precinct ranked 21st safest out of 69 patrol areas for per-capita crime in 2010. However, the precinct covers a large diamond-shaped area, and Maspeth and Middle Village are generally seen as safer than Ridgewood. Middle Village has been historically relatively safe. During the 1970s and 1980s, when crime in New York City was at an all-time high, the Mafia allegedly prevented crime from happening. As of 2018, with a non-fatal assault rate of 19 per 100,000 people, Middle Village, Ridgewood, and Maspeth's rate of violent crimes per capita is less than that of the city as a whole. The incarceration rate of 235 per 100,000 people is lower than that of the city as a whole.

The 104th Precinct has a lower crime rate than in the 1990s, with crimes across all categories having decreased by 87.4% between 1990 and 2018. The precinct reported 2 murders, 17 rapes, 140 robberies, 168 felony assaults, 214 burglaries, 531 grand larcenies, and 123 grand larcenies auto in 2018.

== Fire safety ==
The New York City Fire Department (FDNY)'s Engine Co. 319 fire station is located at 78-11 67th Road.

A volunteer fire department, Fearless Hook and Ladder Company No. 7, operated at 71-55 Metropolitan Avenue from 1891 until 1913.

== Health ==
As of 2018, preterm births and births to teenage mothers are less common in Middle Village, Ridgewood, and Maspeth than in other places citywide. In Middle Village, Ridgewood, and Maspeth, there were 70 preterm births per 1,000 live births (compared to 87 per 1,000 citywide), and 17.6 births to teenage mothers per 1,000 live births (compared to 19.3 per 1,000 citywide). Middle Village, Ridgewood, and Maspeth have a low population of residents who are uninsured. In 2018, this population of uninsured residents was estimated to be 13%, slightly higher than the citywide rate of 12%.

The concentration of fine particulate matter, the deadliest type of air pollutant, in Middle Village, Ridgewood, and Maspeth is 0.008 milligrams per cubic metre (8.0×10^{−9} oz/ft^{3}), more than the city average. Twenty percent of Middle Village, Ridgewood, and Maspeth residents are smokers, which is higher than the city average of 14% of residents being smokers. In Middle Village, Ridgewood, and Maspeth, 19% of residents are obese, 7% are diabetic, and 20% have high blood pressure—compared to the citywide averages of 22%, 8%, and 23% respectively. In addition, 19% of children are obese, compared to the citywide average of 20%.

Ninety-two percent of residents eat some fruits and vegetables every day, which is higher than the city's average of 87%. In 2018, 78% of residents described their health as "good", "very good", or "excellent", equal to the city's average of 78%. For every supermarket in Middle Village, Ridgewood, and Maspeth, there are 5 bodegas.

The nearest major hospital is Elmhurst Hospital Center in Elmhurst.

A study by RentHop.com found that Middle Village had the highest number of dog feces-related complaints within New York City.

== Parks and recreation ==
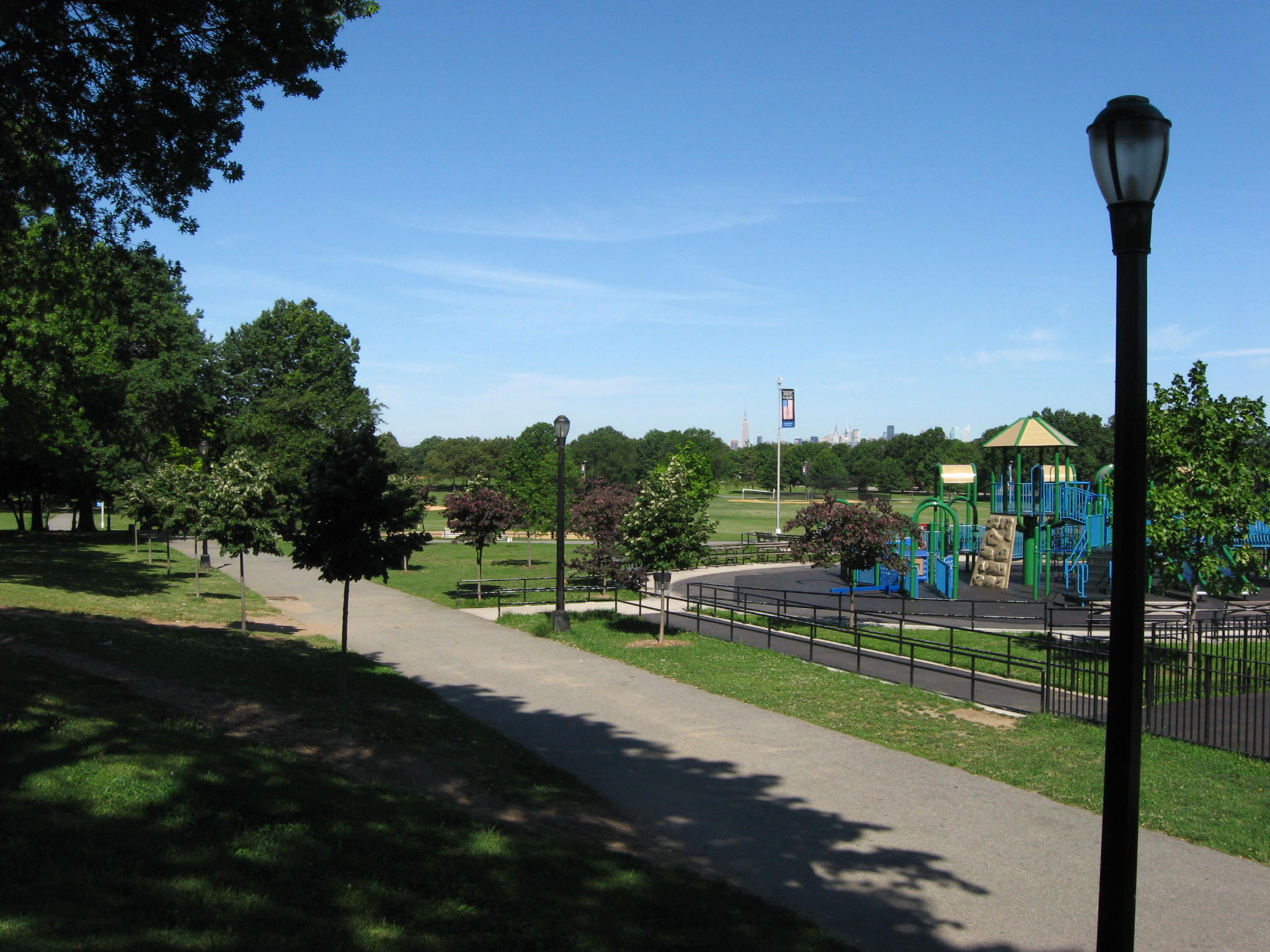
The playground in eastern Juniper Valley Park

Northern Middle Village is served by Juniper Valley Park, a large public park built in 1930 on the former Juniper Swamp. There are tennis, handball, basketball, and bocce courts, as well as seven baseball fields and a quarter-mile running track around a turf football/soccer field.

Another park, the Middle Village Playground, is located at 79th Street between 68th Road and 69th Avenue, in southern Middle Village. The city of New York bought the property in 1938 and renovated the playground in 1994.

The Middle Village Veteran's Triangle, at Gray and 77th Streets, commemorates local people who were veterans of World War I, World War II, the Korean War, and the Vietnam War. It was renovated in 1999.

== Post office and ZIP Code ==
Middle Village is covered by ZIP Code 11379. The United States Post Office operates the Middle Village Station at 71-35 Metropolitan Avenue.

== Education ==
Middle Village, Ridgewood, and Maspeth generally have a lower rate of college-educated residents than the rest of the city as of 2018. While 33% of residents age 25 and older have a college education or higher, 16% have less than a high school education and 50% are high school graduates or have some college education. By contrast, 39% of Queens residents and 43% of city residents have a college education or higher. The percentage of Middle Village, Ridgewood, and Maspeth students excelling in math rose from 36% in 2000 to 67% in 2011, and reading achievement rose from 42% to 49% during the same time period.

Middle Village, Ridgewood, and Maspeth's rate of elementary school student absenteeism is less than the rest of New York City. In Middle Village, Ridgewood, and Maspeth, 14% of elementary school students missed twenty or more days per school year, lower than the citywide average of 20%. Additionally, 82% of high school students in Middle Village, Ridgewood, and Maspeth graduate on time, more than the citywide average of 75%.

=== Schools ===
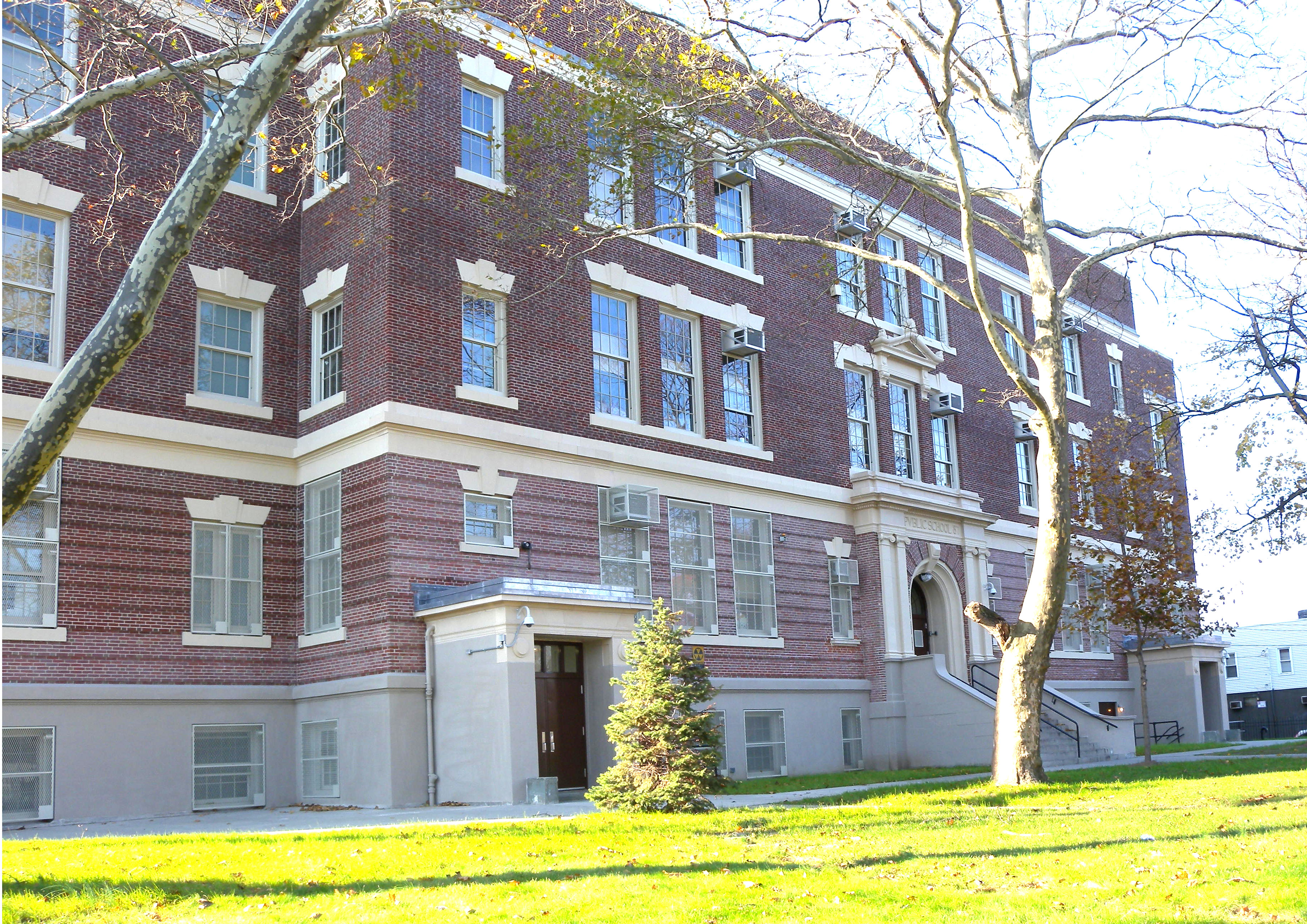
PS 87

Elementary and junior high schools with grades K–8 include PS/IS 49, PS/IS 128 which was also rated as a Blue Ribbon School, and PS 87.

Our Lady of Hope, St. Margaret, and Resurrection-Ascension are three Catholic K-8 schools in the area, and Christ The King Regional High School is another parochial school in the area.

=== Library ===
The Queens Public Library's Middle Village branch is located at 72-31 Metropolitan Avenue.

== Transportation ==
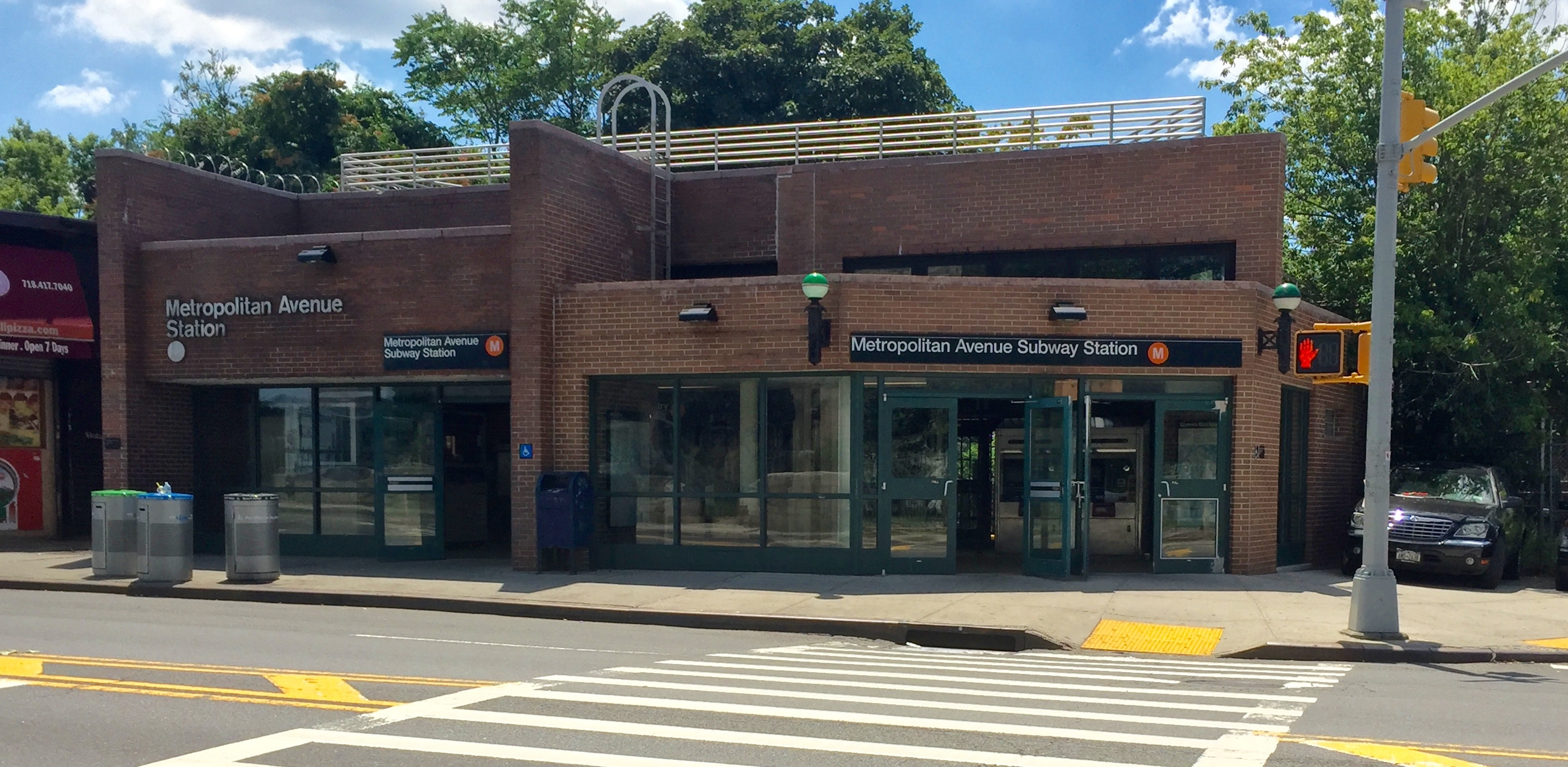
The Metropolitan Avenue station's entrance

The neighborhood is served by the New York City Subway at the Metropolitan Avenue station (M train). In addition, several local bus lines serve Middle Village: the Q14 on Eliot Avenue; the Q29 along Dry Harbor Road and 80th Street; the Q38 on Penelope Avenue; the Q47 on 80th Street; the Q54 on Metropolitan Avenue and the Q67 on 69th Street and Metropolitan Avenue. The QM24, QM25 and QM34 express bus routes to Manhattan, running along Eliot Avenue, also serve the neighborhood. In addition, the Q11, Q52 SBS, Q53 SBS, QM15 and BM5 kiss the border with Rego Park on Woodhaven Boulevard, while the QM16 and QM17 pass through without stopping. The tracks belonging to the New York Connecting Railroad directly east of the Metropolitan Avenue station are planned to be the site of a station along the planned Interborough Express light rail line.

== Notable people ==
Notable current and former residents of Middle Village include:

- Nicole Bass (1964-2017), professional female bodybuilder and wrestler
- William N. Conrad (1889-1968), politician who served in the New York State Senate
- Hyman Golden (1923-2008), co-founder of the Snapple Beverage Corporation
- Verna Hart (1961–2019), African-American artist known for her expressionist painting focused on jazz music.
- Jack McGlynn (born 2003), professional soccer player who plays as a midfielder for Philadelphia Union in Major League Soccer.
- Vincent Piazza (born 1976), film, television and stage actor best known for his roles in the television series Boardwalk Empire, the 2007 film Rocket Science, and as Tommy DeVito in the film adaptation of Jersey Boys
- Mike Repole (born 1969), CEO/creator of Vitamin Water

== See also ==
- List of Queens neighborhoods
