= Metropolitan Avenue (disambiguation) =

Metropolitan Avenue is a major east–west street serving the New York City boroughs of Brooklyn and Queens.

Metropolitan Avenue may also refer to:

== New York City Subway stations ==
- Metropolitan Avenue (IND Crosstown Line), serving the G train
- Middle Village – Metropolitan Avenue (BMT Myrtle Avenue Line), the northern terminus of the M train
- Metropolitan Avenue (BMT Jamaica Line); (demolished)

== Long Island Railroad station ==
- Metropolitan Avenue station (LIRR)
