= Fresh Pond station =

Train station in New York City (1869–1998)

Fresh Pond
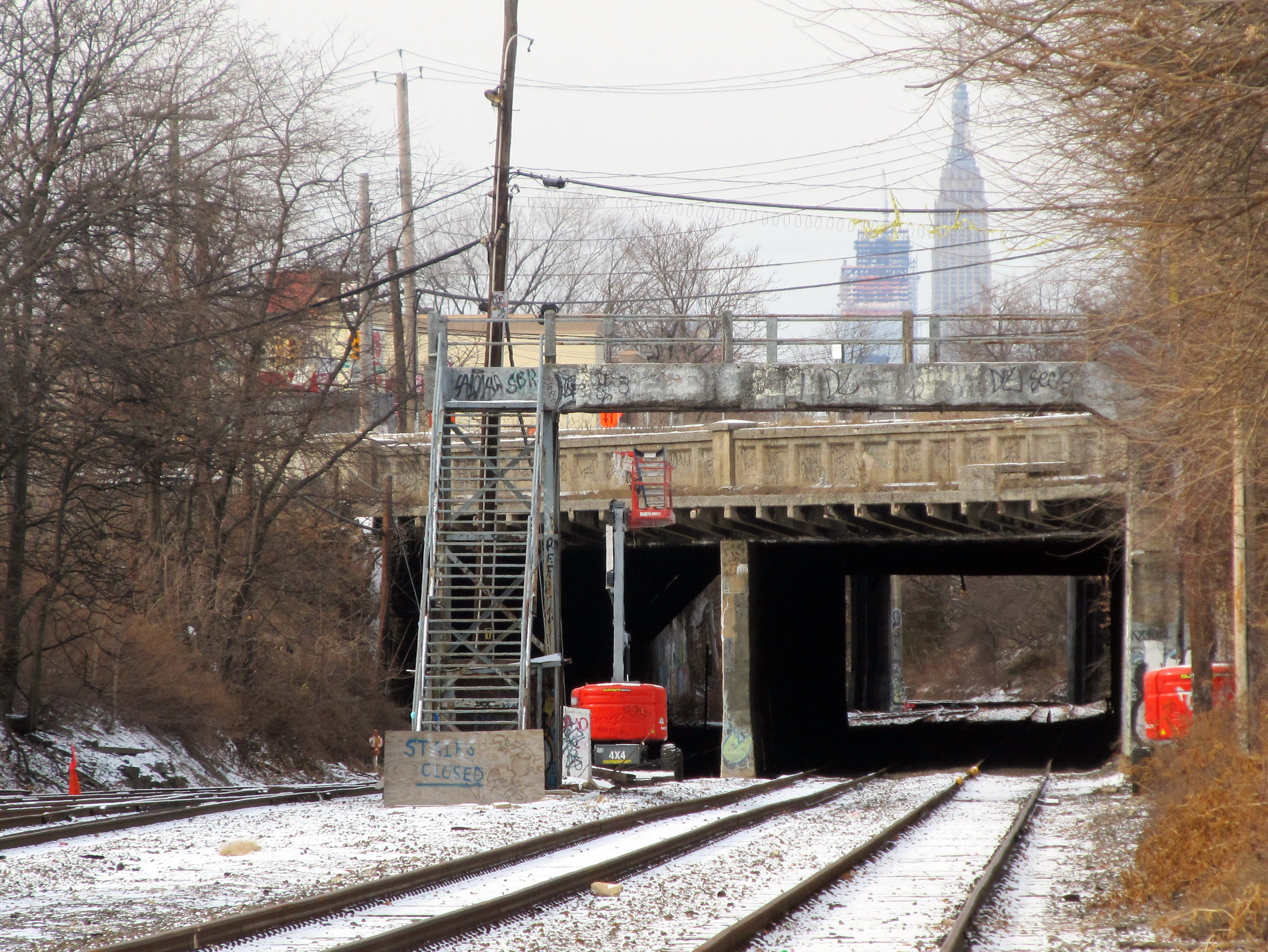
- The site of the former station in December 2017

General information
- Location: Fresh Pond, Queens, New York; U.S.
- Coordinates: 40°42′43.8″N 73°53′56.1″W
- Owner: Long Island Rail Road
- Line: Montauk Branch
- Platforms: 1 side platform, 1 island platform
- Tracks: 3

History
- Opened: June 1869
- Closed: March 16, 1998
- Rebuilt: April 1895
- Electrified: August 29, 1905
- Former names: Bushwick Junction

Former services
Preceding station	Long Island Rail Road	Following station
Maspeth toward Long Island City	Montauk Branch	Glendale toward Montauk
Preceding station	Long Island Rail Road	Following station
Metropolitan Avenue toward Bushwick	Bushwick Branch	Terminus
Terminus	Bay Ridge Branch	Myrtle Avenue toward Bay Ridge
Location

Fresh Pond (formerly known as Bushwick Junction) was a Long Island Rail Road station along the Lower Montauk Branch, located on an open cut near Fresh Pond Road and Metropolitan Avenue in Fresh Pond, Queens, on the border between the neighborhoods of Maspeth and Ridgewood.

== History ==
The station opened around June 1869, however in either 1882 or 1883, it was renamed Bushwick Junction for the connection to the Bushwick Branch. The station was rebuilt in April 1895 and closed again in 1915 as part of a grade elimination project. Though the third station was opened the same year with platforms and pedestrian bridges, the former station house still remained intact well into 1923. For the next four years, both the original name and new name would be on the LIRR timetables until it went back to strictly being named Fresh Pond in 1919.

Fresh Pond station closed on March 16, 1998, along with the four remaining stations on the Lower Montauk branch due to low ridership, which did not make it cost-effective to build high-level platforms needed to support the then-new C3 bi-level cars that replaced the remainder of the rolling stock on the LIRR that were able to board at low-level platforms.

After the station's 1998 closure, the station's overpass and shelter were left intact and continued to occupy the area. However both structures were torn down around early 2023.

== Station layout ==
This station had one low-level island platform between the two southernmost tracks (for eastbound trains) and one low-level side platform serving the northernmost track (for Long Island City-bound trains). However, the platforms were actually a wide area of dirt and gravel. The island platform had a small tin shelter. The only way to reach the station was via a narrow walkway that began at the intersection of Metropolitan Avenue and Fresh Pond Road and went behind a car rental parking lot. It led to an overpass that had staircases going down to each platform.

== See also ==
- Fresh Pond Yard
- Fresh Pond Junction
