= South Eighth Street station =

Train station in New York City (1868–76)

South Eighth Street
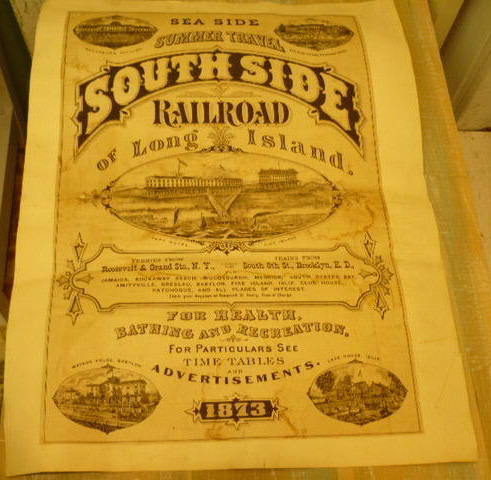
- This is an 1873 South Side Railroad of Long Island Sea Side Travel Broadside Poster mentioning the ferry from Manhattan to the South Eight Street station on the Bushwick Branch.

General information
- Location: South Eighth Street and Kent Avenue; Williamsburg, Brooklyn
- Coordinates: 40.710136°N 73.968577°W
- Line: Bushwick Branch
- Platforms: 1 side platform
- Tracks: 1

Other information
- Station code: None

History
- Opened: November 4, 1868
- Closed: February 29, 1876
- Former names: South Seventh Street

Services
Preceding station	Long Island Rail Road	Following station
Terminus	Bushwick Branch	Bushwick toward Bushwick Junction
Location

South Eighth Street, also known as South Seventh Street on early timetables, was a train station along the Bushwick Branch of the Long Island Rail Road.

== History ==
South Eighth Street was built in September 1868 and opened on November 4, 1868. As the city of Brooklyn would not allow steam trains west of Bushwick, horses pulled the cars individually through the streets to South Eighth Street. In July 1869 the station must have been adequate for two or three trains, for, in a letter of complaint, we read: "...the intersection of South Eighth Street and Kent Avenue is impassable...by reason of the frogs and switches and the crossing rails of the South Side RR. The company has abolished the sidewalk and occupy the space with trucks and wagons unloading directly into their depot." In April 1872, the depot was enlarged by an extension of the roadbed on heavy framework resting on piles to the bulkhead line of the river, nearly 100 feet in length, and giving standing for several additional cars. In a description of the waterfront in 1872 it is read: "The South Side Railroad depot is deserving of mention; it was originally a depot building two stories high, in which are sitting rooms, freight and ticket offices on the first floor for the accommodation of passengers, while on that above are the several offices of the corporation. Early in summer a covered depot to shelter the cars was erected and has just been completed. This rests upon piles and partly extends over the ferry piers."

South Eighth Street was abandoned on February 29, 1876, with the last train leaving on February 26. All rails were removed during May 1876. Part of the old depot buildings were still standing in 1922.

== See also ==
- Bushwick Branch
- Long Island Rail Road
