= Queens Community Board 5 =

Queens Community District 5 Queens Community Board 5
- Community District
- Country: United States
- State: New York
- City: New York City
- Borough: Queens
- Neighborhoods: list: Glendale; Maspeth; Middle Village; Ridgewood

Government
  - Type: Community board
  - Body: Queens Community Board 5
  - Chairperson: Walter Sanchez
  - District Manager: Gary Giordano

Area
  - Total: 7.5 sq mi (19 km^{2})

Population (2016)
  - Total: 174,240
  - Density: 23,000/sq mi (9,000/km^{2})

Ethnicity
  - African-American: 1.5%
  - Asian: 8.4%
  - Hispanic and Latino Americans: 35.8%
  - White: 53.1%
  - Others: 1.3%
- Time zone: UTC−5 (Eastern)
  - Summer (DST): UTC−4 (EDT)
- ZIP codes: 11374, 11378, 11379, and 11385
- Area codes: 718, 347, and 929, and 917
- Police Precincts: 104th (website)
- Website: www1.nyc.gov/site/queenscb5/index.page

The Queens Community Board 5 is a local government in the New York City borough of Queens, encompassing the neighborhoods of Ridgewood, Glendale, Middle Village, Maspeth, Fresh Pond, and Liberty Park. It is delimited by Maurice Avenue and the Long Island Expressway to the north, the Brooklyn borough line to the west and south, and Woodhaven Boulevard to the east.
