= June Blum =

American artist (1929–2017)

- Born: June Druiett; December 10, 1929; Maspeth, Queens, New York, U.S.
- Died: June 14, 2017 (aged 87); Cocoa Beach, Florida, U.S.
- Spouse: Maurice C. Blum

June Druiett Blum (December 10, 1929—June 14, 2017) was an American multimedia artist who produced paintings, sculptures, prints, light shows, happenings, jewelry, art books, pottery, conceptual documentations, and drawings. She was also a feminist curator and activist who worked to advance the women's movement and increase visibility for women artists.

== Early life and education ==
June Blum, née Druiett, was born in Maspeth, Queens, New York, on December 10, 1929, where she was raised mostly by her mother, Elsie Sally Druiett (1897–1983), because her father, Henry Charles Druiett (1899–1941), died at the age of 41. In 1958, she married Maurice C. Blum (1913–1985), a businessman, poet, and avid photographer who documented the women's art movement. A collection of his poems, Love in Bloom: Poetry and Photography, was published posthumously in 1988.

Blum studied at Brooklyn College, Pratt Graphic Art Center, Art Students League of New York, Craft Students League, and The New School for Social Research. At the Brooklyn Museum Art School, she studied with Reuben Tam, Tom Doyle, and Reuben Kadish, among others. Her first solo exhibition was at the Hicks Street Gallery, Brooklyn, in 1965.

== Work ==
=== Curatorial work and political activism ===
As curator of the Contemporary Art Program (1971–75) at the Suffolk Museum (now the Long Island Museum of American Art, History, and Carriages), Blum conceived Unmanly Art (1972), the first in-house museum-curated exhibition of works by women artists. Blum also coordinated Works on Paper/Women Artists (1975) at the Brooklyn Museum, another show that supported the work of women. The exhibition, however, "was outflanked by a major exhibit" called Of Men Only: A Review of Men's and Boys' Fashions, 1750–1975. During Works on Paper/Women Artists, Blum served as the moderator for "Curators, Critics & the Economics of the Woman Artist," a panel that included Judith Van Baron, Patricia Mainardi, and Janet Schneider. Also in 1975, she formed an organization called Women Artists Living in Brooklyn and served as a juror for Washington to Washington, an exhibition held at the National Museum of Women in the Arts. Blum participated in the first formal panel on "Gender and Art" to be held in Seattle, which coincided with her solo exhibition in 1977 at NN Gallery. On the panel, she stated her belief that "there is gender in art, that female consciousness exists and should be encouraged," which contrasted with the idea that art is gender-neutral. In 1980, after moving to Cocoa Beach, Florida, Blum formed the East Central Florida chapter of Women's Caucus for Art. She also founded Women for Art, an imprimatur for the publication of catalogues, and was a member of the New York Professional Women Artists. In addition, Blum was a founding member of Central Hall Artists Gallery (est. 1973), an all-women cooperative exhibition space in Port Washington, New York.

=== Art ===
June Blum's early work focused on black-and-white abstractions, especially between 1963 and 1968, although she painted both figuratively and abstractly throughout her career. She was inspired by Theodoros Stamos and Ad Reinhardt, but their forms were "not enough" because she "needed more visual involvement," according to the artist. Blum's "black and whites," as she called them, have distinctive organic forms that arc, loop, and curve against a dark background.

Derived from her abstractions and the influence of Happenings, Blum sporadically created "time–light–space environment events" between 1968 and 1982. The first was The Female President (1968–69), in which she posited a female commander-in-chief of the United States, conveyed abstractly through changing light effects on dancers and actors, accompanied by sounds and electronic music. Other such events were Medusa (1970) and American Queen (1972), both of which concerned feminist themes that coincided with Blum's emerging activism. Blum also created "conceptual documentations," likewise feminist, which included The Female Connection (1978).

In the 1970s, Blum began to paint portraits of women in feminist circles, including Alice Neel (c. 1972–73), Patricia Mainardi (1974), Cindy Nemser (1975), Sylvia Sleigh (1975), and Betty Friedan. For The Sister Chapel, which premiered at PS1 in 1978, she created a nine-foot portrait of Betty Friedan as the Prophet (1976), a towering figure who has just descended from a distant mountain like a biblical prophet with The Feminine Mystique tucked under her arm. Friedan was Blum's main inspiration for becoming a feminist and she continued to inspire the artist's work, most notably in a series of portraits and a group of "conceptual documentations," created between 1976 and 1978.

== Recognition ==
Blum was awarded the Medal of Honor in 2003 for her role in advancing the study of women in the arts. In January 2011, Blum was the Veteran Feminists of America artist of the month.
