= Maspeth, Queens =

Neighborhood in New York City

Maspeth
- Neighborhood of Queens
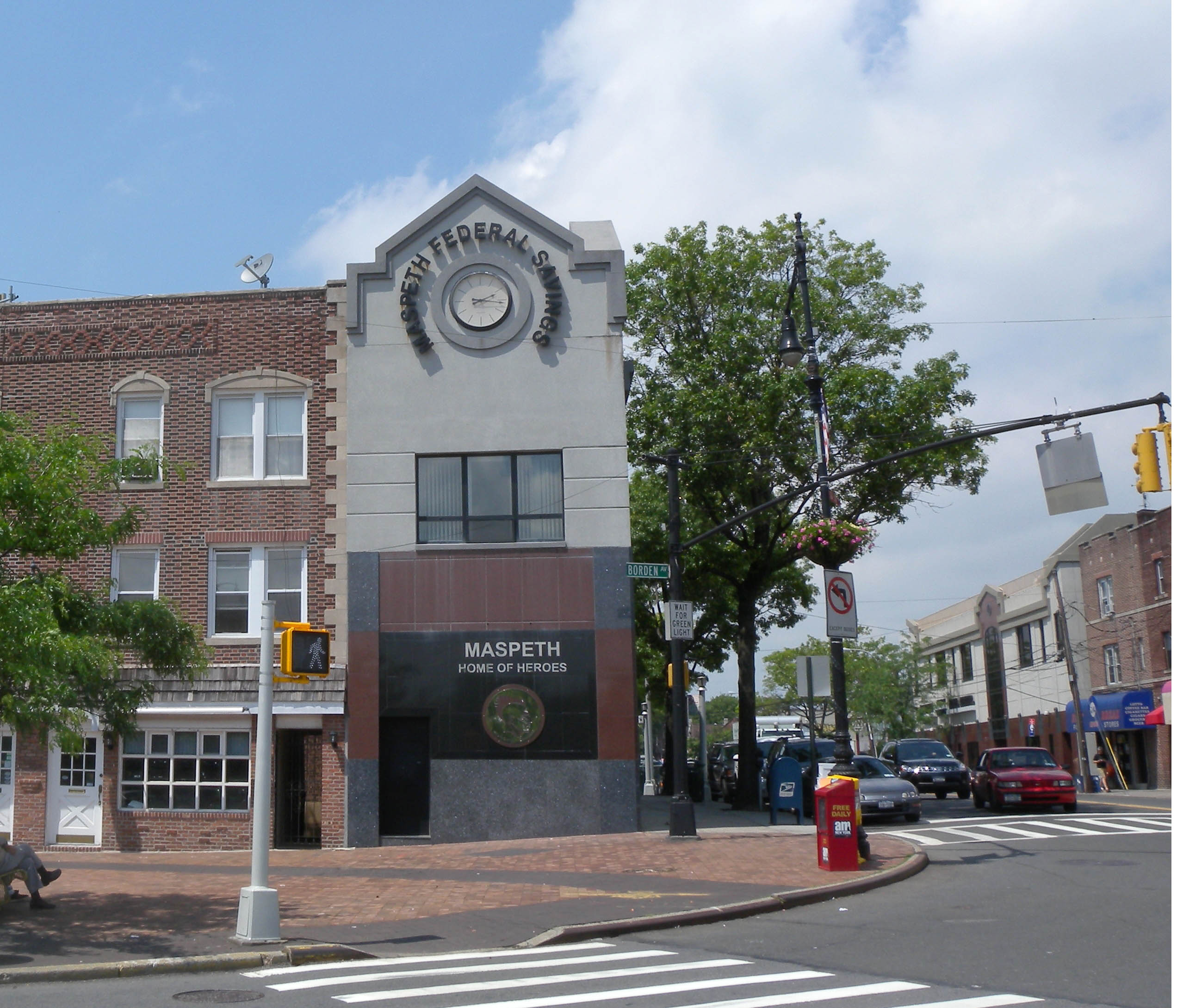
- Maspeth Federal Savings Bank
- Interactive map of Maspeth
- Coordinates: 40.728°N 73.907°W
- Country: United States
- State: New York
- City: New York City
- County/Borough: Queens
- Community District: Queens 5
- European settlement: 1642
- Founder: Dutch settlers
- Named for: Maspat Indians

Population (2010 Census)
  - Total: 30,516

Ethnicity
  - White: 79.2%
  - Hispanic: 7.6%
  - Asian: 12.0%
  - Black: 0.8%
  - Other/Multiracial: 1.4%

Economics
  - Median income: $92,075
- Time zone: UTC– 05:00 (EST)
  - Summer (DST): UTC– 04:00 (EDT)
- ZIP Code: 11378
- Area codes: 718, 347, 929, and 917

Maspeth is a residential and commercial community in the borough of Queens in New York City. It was founded in the early 17th century by Dutch and English settlers. Neighborhoods sharing borders with Maspeth are Woodside to the north; Sunnyside to the northwest; Greenpoint, Brooklyn, to the west; East Williamsburg, Brooklyn, to the southwest; Fresh Pond and Ridgewood to the south; and Middle Village and Elmhurst to the east.

Maspeth is located in Queens Community District 5 and its ZIP Code is 11378. It is patrolled by the New York City Police Department's 104th Precinct. Politically, Maspeth is represented by the New York City Council's 26th and 30th districts.

== History ==
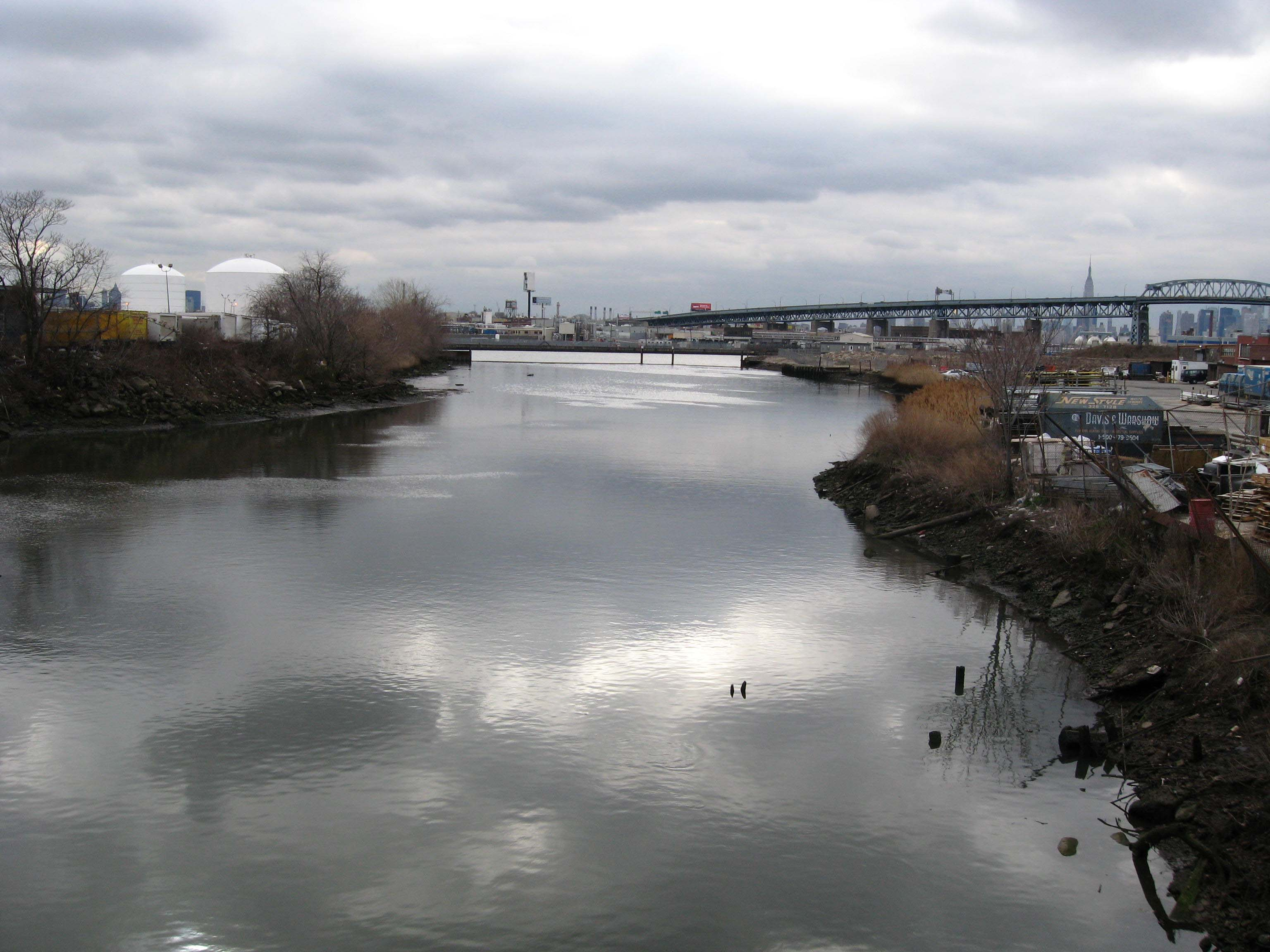
Maspeth Creek, looking west toward Newtown Creek

The name "Maspeth" is derived from the name of Mespeatches Native Americans, one of the 13 main tribes that inhabited Long Island. It is translated to mean "an inundating tidal river" as determined by William Wallace Tooker.

The area known today as Maspeth was chartered by New Netherlanders and British settlers in the early 17th century. The Dutch had purchased land in the area known today as Queens in 1635, and within a few years began chartering towns. In 1642, they settled Maspat, under a charter granted to Rev. Francis Doughty, making Maspeth the first English settlement in Queens.

The deed that was signed between the Native Americans and the settlers was the first one signed on Long Island. As part of the deed's signature, the "Newtown Patent" granted 13,000 acres (5,300 ha) to settlers. Conflicts with the Maspat tribe forced many settlers to move to what is now Elmhurst in 1643. The settlement was leveled the following year in an attack by Native Americans, and the surviving settlers returned to Manhattan.

In 1652, settlers ventured back to the area, settling an area slightly inland from the previous Maspat location. This new area was called Middleburg, and eventually developed into what is now Elmhurst, bordering Maspeth. Originally, 28 English Quakers had founded the village of Maspeth, which had sizable water and milling industries along Newtown Creek and Maspeth Creek. Two storekeepers, Nathanial Hazard and Francis T. White, sold food and clothes at the Maspeth Town Docks, at what is now 56th Terrace and Rust Street, by the late 18th century. After the American Revolutionary War, villagers repaved roads with crushed oyster shells or wooden planks.

Columbusville was the name formerly applied to a section of Maspeth. It was a development of Edward Dunn that took place on 69th Place, originally known as Firth Avenue, between Grand Avenue and Caldwell Avenue during 1854–55, and was subsequently absorbed into Maspeth. The name fell into disuse in the 1890s.

What was Laurel Hill in the post-colonial era has become West Maspeth, bounded by Calvary Cemetery, and later the Brooklyn-Queens Expressway, in the west, the Queens-Midtown Expressway on the north, 58th Street on the east, and 56th Road and the Long Island Rail Road's Montauk Branch on the south. Laurel Hill Boulevard (56th Road) is a remnant of the neighborhood's previous name, although all traces of the former Laurel Hill railroad station are gone.

Following waves of immigration during the 19th century, Maspeth was home to a shanty town of Boyash (Ludar) Gypsies between 1925 and 1939, though this was eventually bulldozed. By the 1970s, the neighborhood had become home primarily to German, Irish, Lithuanian, and Polish residents. Maspeth was considered relatively safe compared to other New York City neighborhoods experiencing crime increases, and multiple generations of the same family often lived in Maspeth.

== Demographics ==
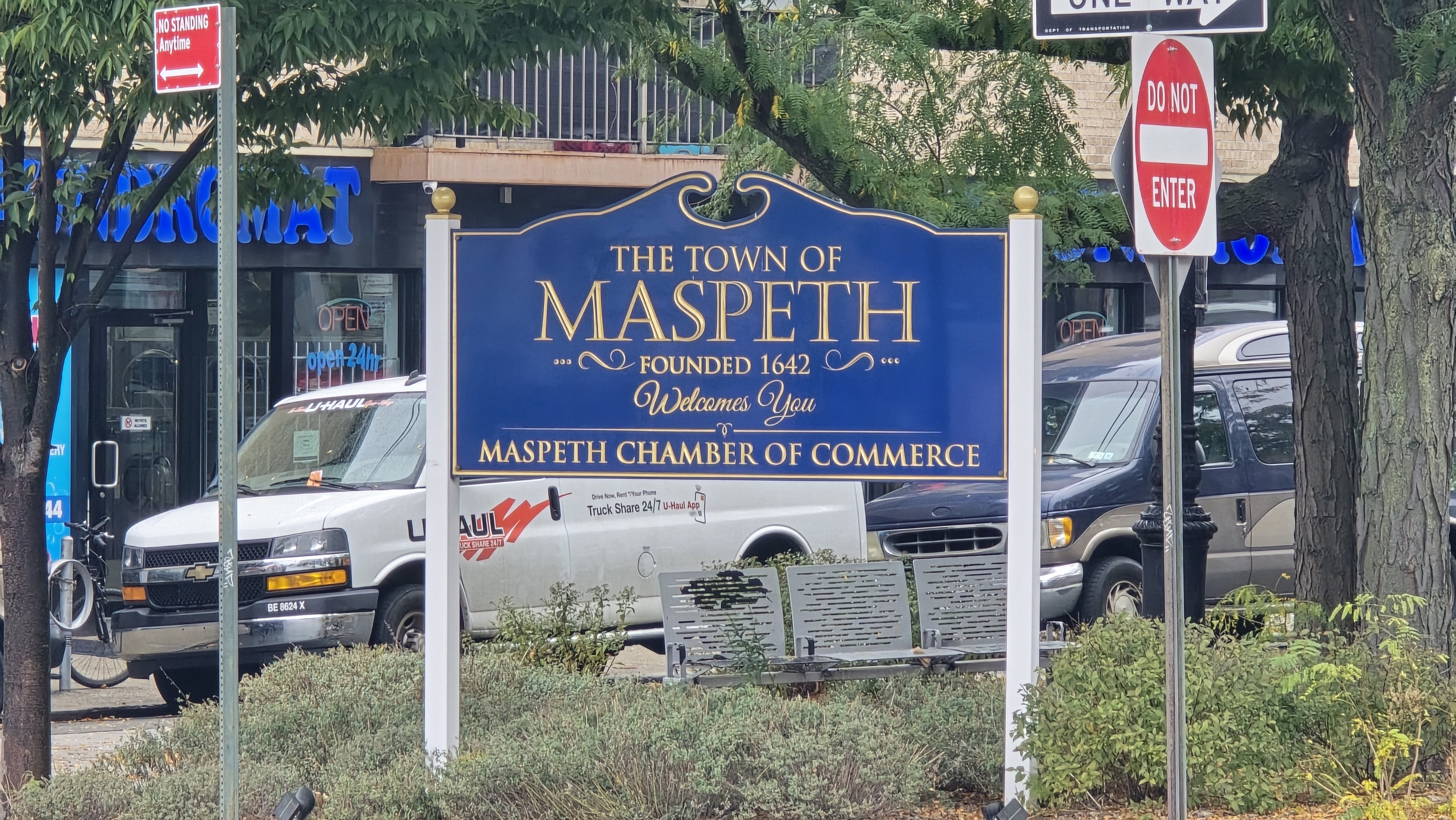
Maspeth sign

The entirety of Community Board 5, which comprises Maspeth, Ridgewood, Middle Village, and Glendale, had 166,924 inhabitants as of NYC Health's 2018 Community Health Profile, with an average life expectancy of 81.4 years. This is about equal to the median life expectancy of 81.2 for all New York City neighborhoods. Most inhabitants are youth and middle-aged adults: 22% are between the ages of 0–17, 31% between 25 and 44, and 26% between 45 and 64. The ratio of college-aged and elderly residents was lower, at 8% and 13% respectively.

As of 2017, the median household income in Community Board 5 was $71,234. In 2018, an estimated 19% of Maspeth and Ridgewood residents lived in poverty, compared to 19% in all of Queens and 20% in all of New York City. One in seventeen residents (6%) were unemployed, compared to 8% in Queens and 9% in New York City. Rent burden, or the percentage of residents who have difficulty paying their rent, is 46% in Maspeth and Ridgewood, lower than the boroughwide and citywide rates of 53% and 51% respectively. Based on this calculation, as of 2018, Maspeth, Ridgewood, Middle Village, and Glendale are considered to be high-income relative to the rest of the city and not gentrifying.

Most people who live in Maspeth are of Polish, Italian, or Irish descent. This is reflected in the many businesses in the neighborhood like Irish pubs and Italian and Polish specialty stores and markets. Many people of Eastern European, German, Chinese, or Hispanic origin (mostly Puerto Ricans from nearby Ridgewood) have also moved to the area. The Polish population in Maspeth is relatively large; the New York metropolitan area is home to the second largest community of Polish Americans behind Chicago.

=== 2020 census ===
In the 2020 census data from the New York City Department of City Planning, Maspeth is part of a neighborhood tabulation areas of the same name. Maspeth had 43,257 residents. The racial makeup was 47.9% (20,731) White, 1.4% (607) African American, 16.0% (6,916) Asian, 0.9% (409) from other races, and 1.5% (635) from two or more races. Hispanic or Latino of any race were 32.3% (13,959) of the population.

=== 2010 census ===
Based on data from the 2010 United States census, the population of Maspeth was 30,516, an increase of 1,600 (5.5%) from the 28,916 counted in 2000. Covering an area of 818.44 acres (331.21 ha), the neighborhood had a population density of 37.3 inhabitants per acre (23,900/sq mi; 9,200/km^{2}).

The racial makeup of the neighborhood was 59.2% (18,080) White, 0.8% (253) African American, 0.1% (31) Native American, 12.0% (3,676) Asian, 0.0% (1) Pacific Islander, 0.4% (115) from other races, and 0.8% (245) from two or more races. Hispanic or Latino of any race were 26.6% (8,115) of the population.

== Land use ==
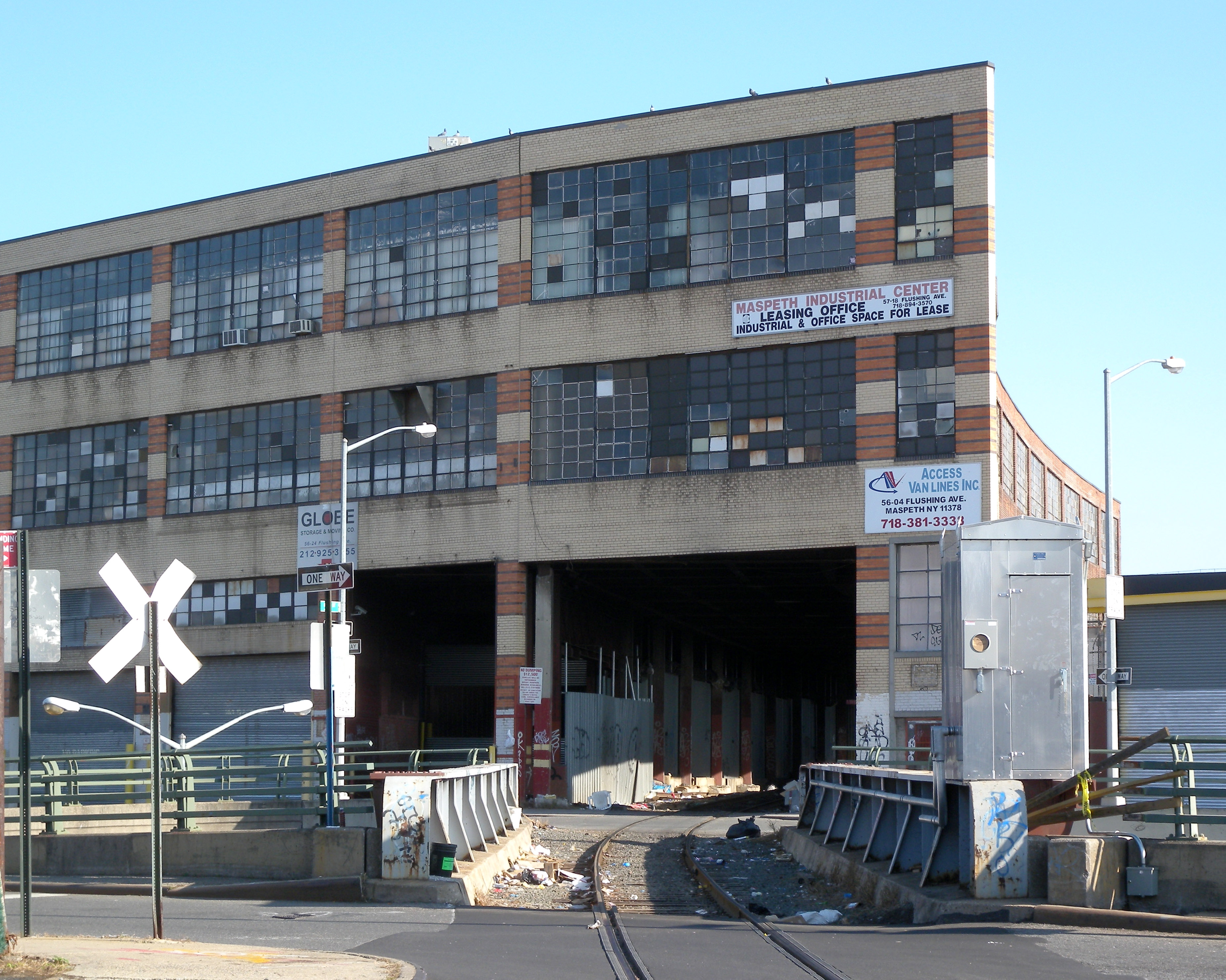
The Long Island Rail Road's freight-only Bushwick Branch runs through the Maspeth Industrial Center.

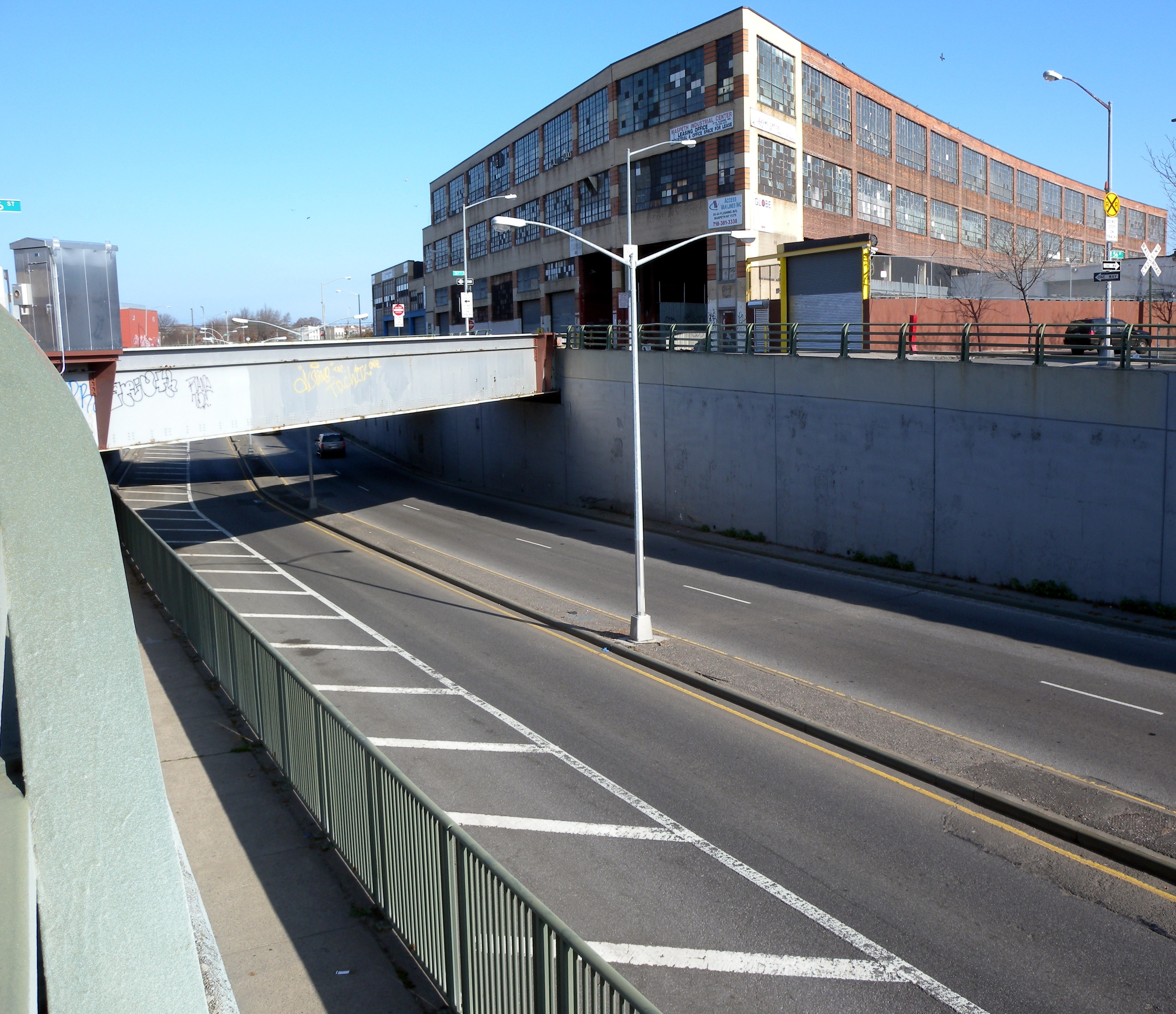
Flushing Avenue going below the Bushwick Branch

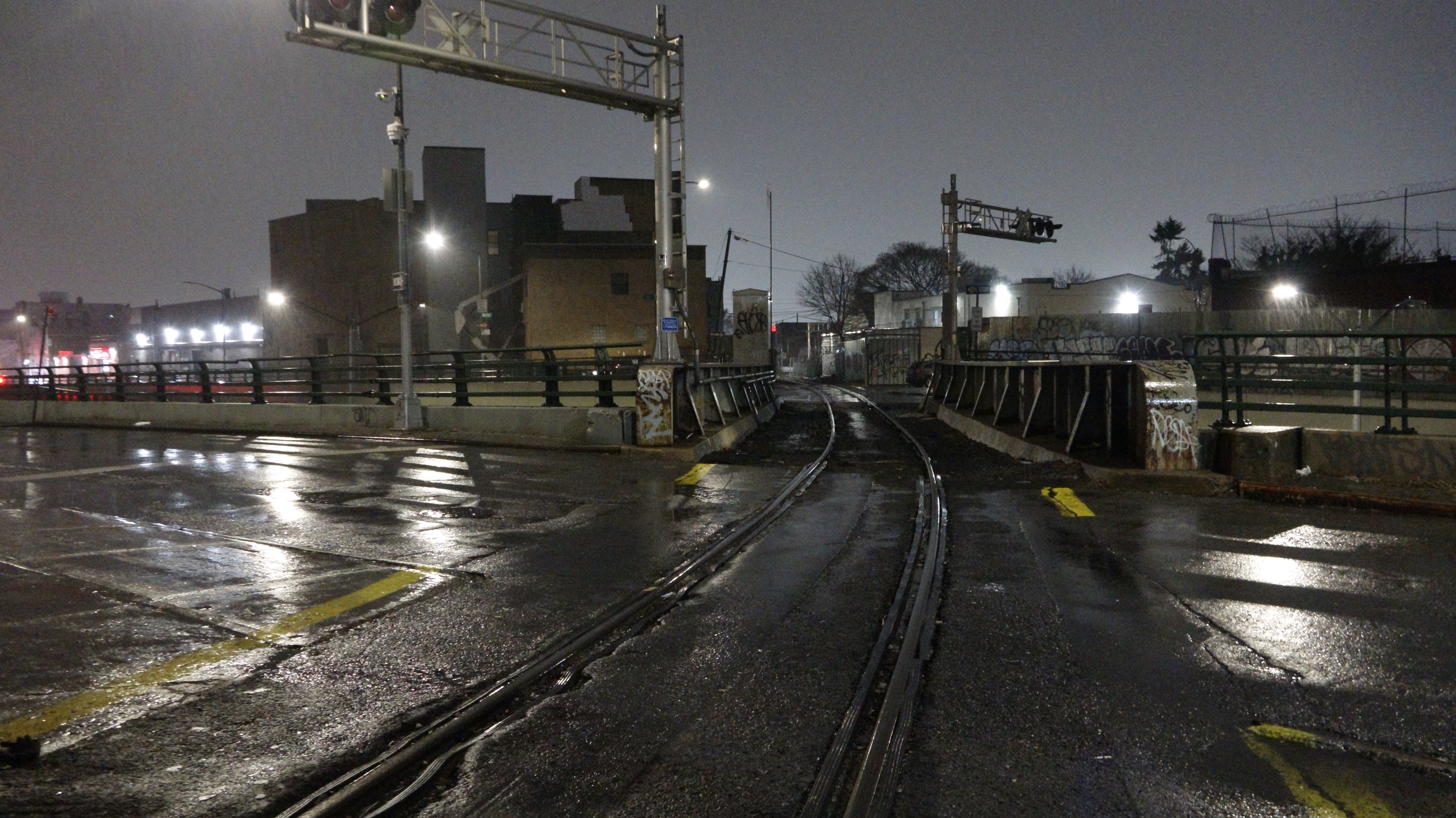
The Bushwick Branch running over Flushing Avenue

Maspeth is zoned for a mixture of uses. The area consisting of 43rd Street through 58th Street, including the former Furman Island, is mostly industrial lowlands. The blocks from 60th Street to 74th Street are mostly residential, but there is a small industrial presence on Grand Avenue.

=== Industrial ===
The Phelps Dodge Corporation was present from 1920 to 1983, during which matter from their premises contaminated Newtown Creek, which separates northern Brooklyn from western Queens and serves barge traffic. In the 2000s, politicians started to make efforts to clean up the Newtown and Maspeth Creeks.

Freight train traffic moves on the Long Island Rail Road Montauk Branch and the lightly used Bushwick Branch, both of which are used by the New York and Atlantic Railway. The LIRR Bay Ridge Branch, a freight-only railway branch, separates the neighborhood from Elmhurst and Middle Village. A new West Maspeth rail freight station has been proposed in connection with a Cross-Harbor Rail Tunnel to diminish truck traffic across New York City. It is opposed by residents who do not want more trucks in Maspeth.

The Elmhurst gas tanks were formerly located in the area and were demolished in 2001. They are now the site of Elmhurst Park. The Maspeth gas tanks were also located in the area until they were demolished.

=== Residential and commercial ===
Single and multi-family dwellings make up most of Maspeth. There are few apartment buildings, except for the Ridgewood Gardens co-ops along 65th Place. Houses in Maspeth range from 400 to 600 thousand dollars. One particularly notable group of houses in the area is a cluster of 2- and 3-story orange and yellow brick buildings located between Grand Avenue, 79th Street, and Calamus Avenue. They were made for the Mathews Company and built in 1930 by Louis Allmendinger.

Much of the area's commerce is situated along Grand Avenue.

The neighborhood, which is nearly isolated by the industrial areas and cemeteries surrounding it, is described by some residents as having a small-town feeling. It is bisected by the Long Island Expressway, though the two parts of Maspeth are connected by several crossings across the expressway. There are many community organizations, which have, among other things, preserved the neighborhood's small-town-like character; for example, they blocked the construction of a Home Depot at the site of what is now the Elmhurst Park.

=== Cemeteries ===
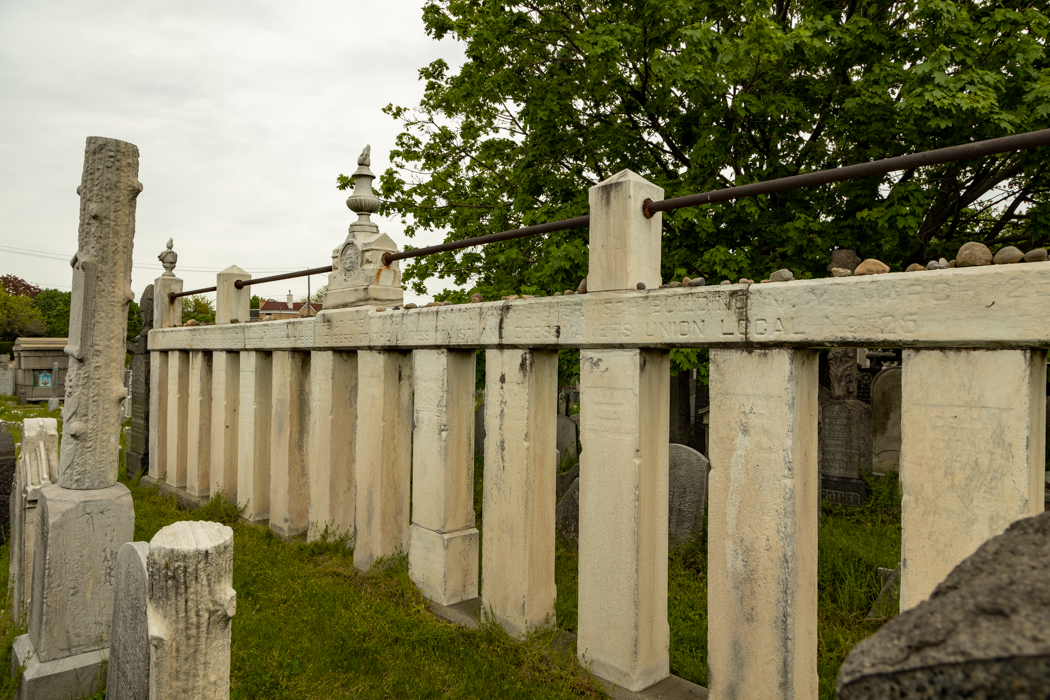
Triangle Shirtwaist Factory Memorial, Mount Zion Cemetery

Cemeteries take up another large part of Maspeth, although they are separated from residential areas for the most part. The Mount Olivet Cemetery, the largest cemetery in the neighborhood, is located on a high hill in Maspeth and used to be an outer-borough vacation site. Mount Olivet Cemetery was planned on March 26, 1850, when James Maurice held a meeting at his Maspeth house to discuss the formation of the cemetery. Notable interments in the cemetery include cosmetics magnate Helena Rubinstein Courielli and sixteen victims of the 1911 Triangle Shirtwaist Factory fire. The adjoining Mount Zion Cemetery contains a memorial to the victims of the fire.

== Police and crime ==
Maspeth, Ridgewood, Middle Village, and Glendale are patrolled by the 104th Precinct of the NYPD, located at 64–02 Catalpa Avenue. The 104th Precinct ranked 21st safest out of 69 patrol areas for per-capita crime in 2010. However, the precinct covers a large diamond-shaped area, and Maspeth and Middle Village are generally seen as safer than Ridgewood. As of 2018, with a non-fatal assault rate of 19 per 100,000 people, Maspeth and Ridgewood's rate of violent crimes per capita is less than that of the city as a whole. The incarceration rate of 235 per 100,000 people is lower than that of the city as a whole.

The 104th Precinct has a lower crime rate than in the 1990s, with crimes across all categories having decreased by 87.4% between 1990 and 2018. The precinct reported 2 murders, 17 rapes, 140 robberies, 168 felony assaults, 214 burglaries, 531 grand larcenies, and 123 grand larcenies auto in 2018.

== Fire safety ==
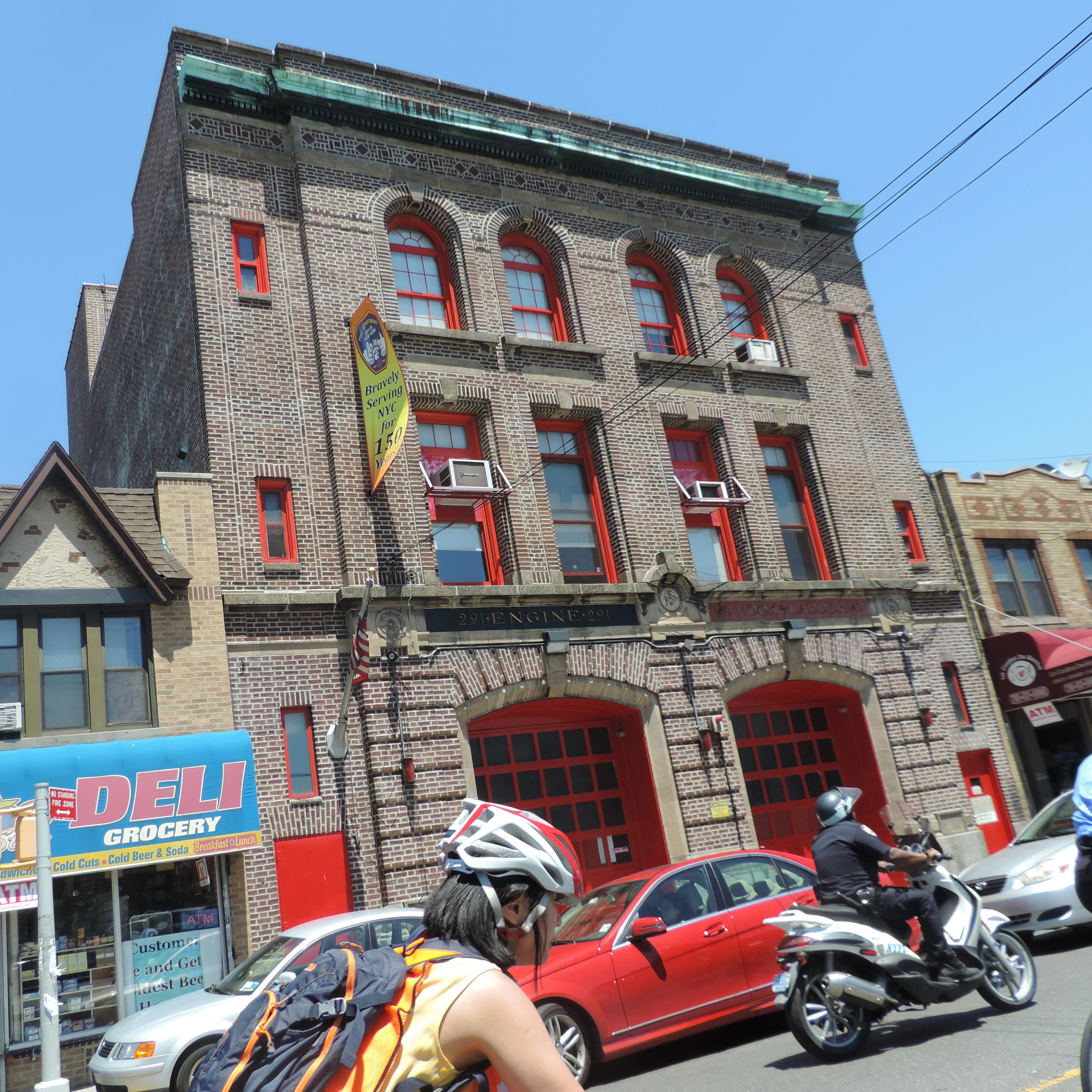
Firehouse on Metropolitan Avenue

Maspeth contains a New York City Fire Department (FDNY) fire station, Squad 288/Hazardous Materials Co. 1, at 56–29 68th Street. Another fire station, Engine Co. 291/Ladder Co. 140, is located at 56–07 Metropolitan Avenue in Ridgewood, just outside the Maspeth border.

The firehouse of Squad 288/Hazmat 1 was designed by Morgan & Trainer and opened in 1914. During the September 11 attacks in 2001, Squad 288/Hazmat 1 were among the first to respond. The firehouse lost 19 firefighters in the collapse of the towers, the largest loss from any firehouse in the city. The New York City Landmarks Preservation Commission considered the firehouse for official city landmark status in 2013.

== Health ==
As of 2018, preterm births and births to teenage mothers are less common in Maspeth and Ridgewood than in other places citywide. In Maspeth and Ridgewood, there were 70 preterm births per 1,000 live births (compared to 87 per 1,000 citywide), and 17.6 births to teenage mothers per 1,000 live births, compared to 19.3 per 1,000 citywide. Maspeth and Ridgewood have a low population of residents who are uninsured. In 2018, this population of uninsured residents was estimated to be 13%, slightly higher than the citywide rate of 12%.

The concentration of fine particulate matter, the deadliest type of air pollutant, in Maspeth and Ridgewood is 0.008 milligrams per cubic metre (8.0×10^{−9} oz/ft^{3}), more than the city average. Twenty percent of Maspeth and Ridgewood residents are smokers, which is higher than the city average of 14% of residents being smokers. In Maspeth and Ridgewood, 19% of residents are obese, 7% are diabetic, and 20% have high blood pressure—compared to the citywide averages of 22%, 8%, and 23% respectively. In addition, 19% of children are obese, compared to the citywide average of 20%.

Ninety-two percent of residents eat some fruits and vegetables every day, which is higher than the city's average of 87%. In 2018, 78% of residents described their health as "good", "very good", or "excellent", equal to the city's average of 78%. For every supermarket in Maspeth and Ridgewood, there are 5 bodegas.

The nearest major hospital is Elmhurst Hospital Center in Elmhurst.

== Post office and ZIP Code ==
Maspeth is covered by ZIP Code 11378. The United States Post Office operates the Maspeth Station at 55–02 69th Street.

== Economy ==
Hagstrom Map, the best-selling brand of road maps in the New York metropolitan area from the mid-20th to early 21st century, was based in Maspeth.

== Community institutions ==
The Maspeth Town Hall community center is located on 72nd Street. A one-room schoolhouse between 1897 and 1932, it was then occasionally used by a local girls' club and the Works Progress Administration until 1936. It was a New York City Police Department precinct until 1971. The building was renovated and made into a community center in 1972.

Other neighborhood institutions include the local Chamber of Commerce, the Lions Club, and the Maspeth Federal Savings Bank.

== Parks and plazas ==
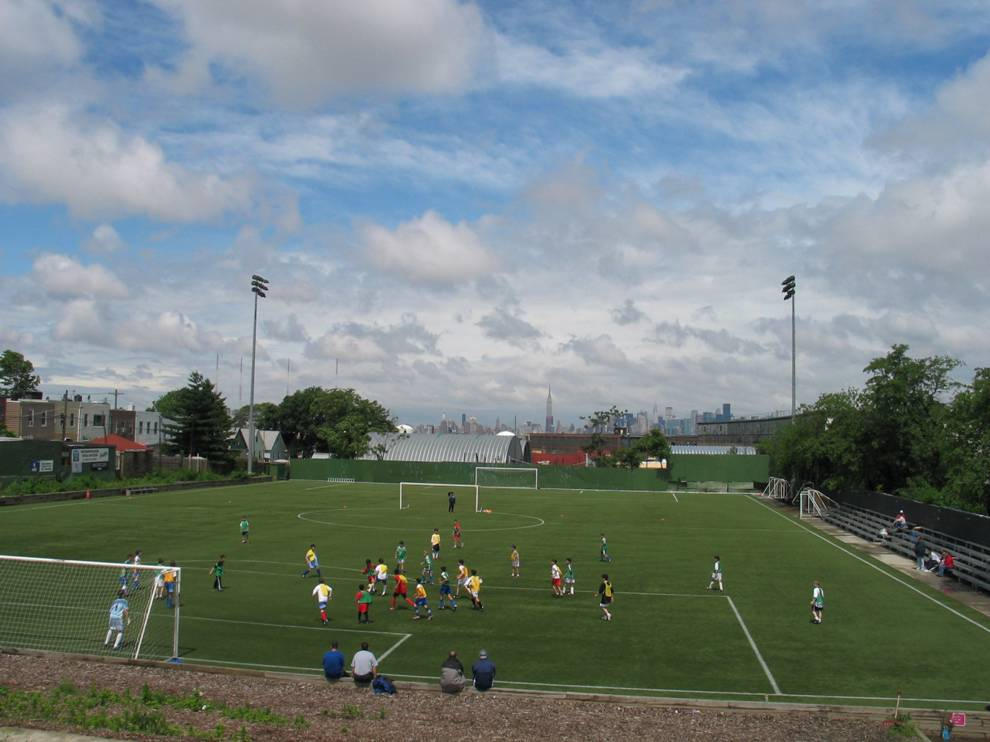
The Metropolitan Oval

A September 11 memorial has been erected at 69th Street and Grand Avenue to commemorate the local FDNY Squad 288 and HAZMAT 1 firehouse's casualties from the September 11 attacks on the World Trade Center, which were the largest of any FDNY unit. The monument, adjacent to the LIE, faces the World Trade Center site, where the One World Trade Center can be seen. An annual memorial ceremony is held at the monument on September 11. The Walk of Honor, unveiled on Memorial Day 2006, is also in the square, and honors activists and visionaries who lived in the area.

Public parks, operated by the New York City Department of Parks and Recreation, include the Frontera Park at 69th Street and the LIE, as well as Principe Park at Maurice and 54th Avenues. Traditionally known as Maurice Park, it was renamed in 2005 in tribute to the community leader Frank Principe, who played a key role in its creation and continued welfare throughout his life.

The smallest park in New York City, Luke J. Lang Square, is located at the triangle caused by the intersection of Fresh Pond Road, 59th Road, and 61st Street. The park, which honors a local resident who died in World War I, occupies 0.001 acres (0.00040 ha) of land. Luke J. Lang Square consists of hedges, but formerly contained "a flagpole, several benches, and three Norway maples." Another very small park, Garlinge Triangle at Grand and 57th Avenues, honors other residents who died in World War I. It is named after Private Walter A. Garlinge, the first Maspeth resident to die during the war.

Maspeth is also home to the Metropolitan Oval, a playing field for soccer players, which contains a view of the Manhattan skyline.

At Grand Avenue and the LIE, a plaque to "Horse Cars Rest Stop" exists. There used to be a horse cart barn at Brown Place, one block east of Grand Avenue. It is now Peter Charles Park, a small pocket park. When the LIE was built in the 1950s, it also demolished many streets; the construction of the LIE left many small triangular plazas behind, such as at 57th Road and 73rd Place, where the "Quick Brown Fox Park", another pocket park, is located. The park is named after a story about a quick brown fox.

== Points of interest ==
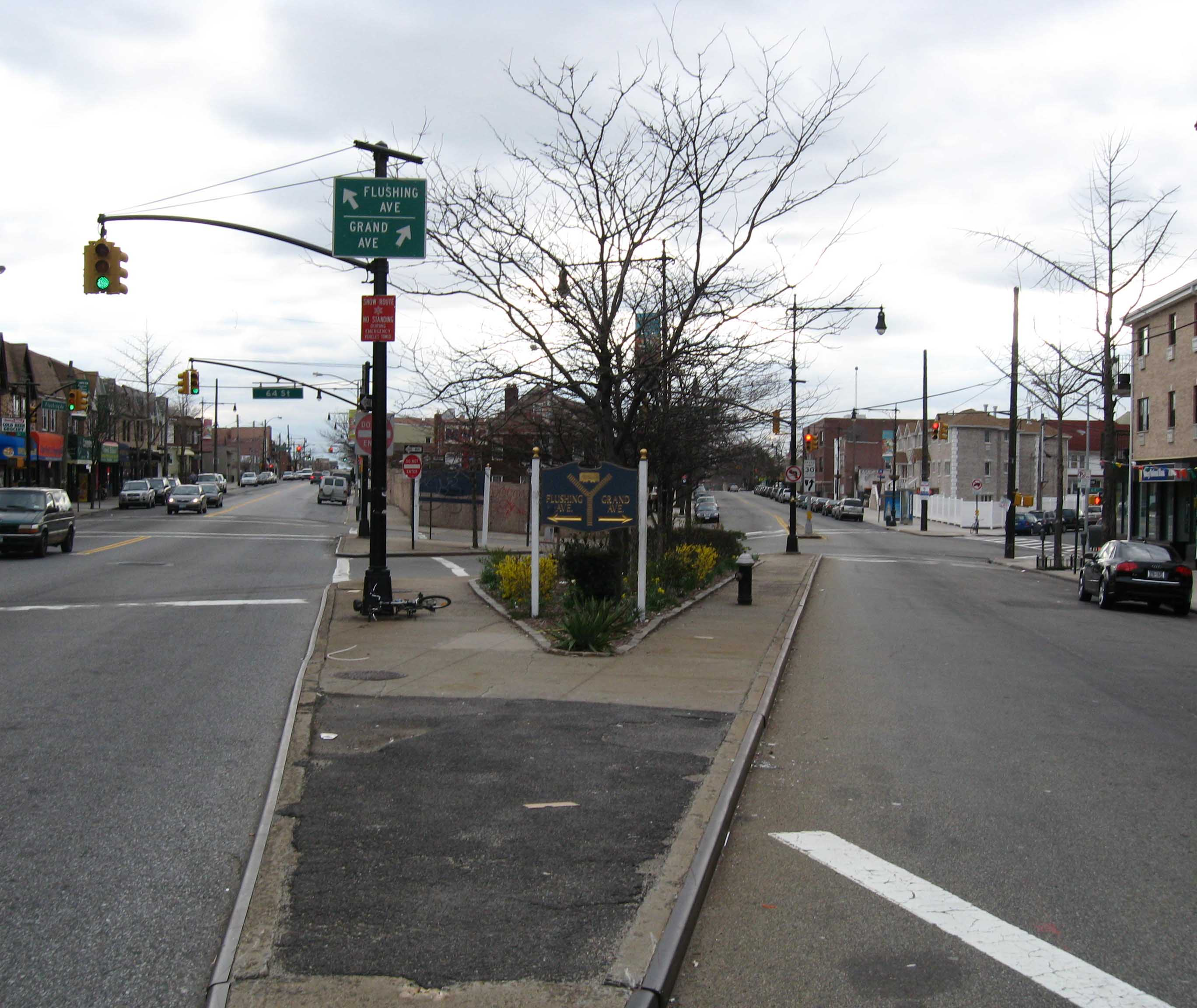
The intersection of Flushing Avenue and Grand Avenue, where a sign marks the separation of former streetcar lines

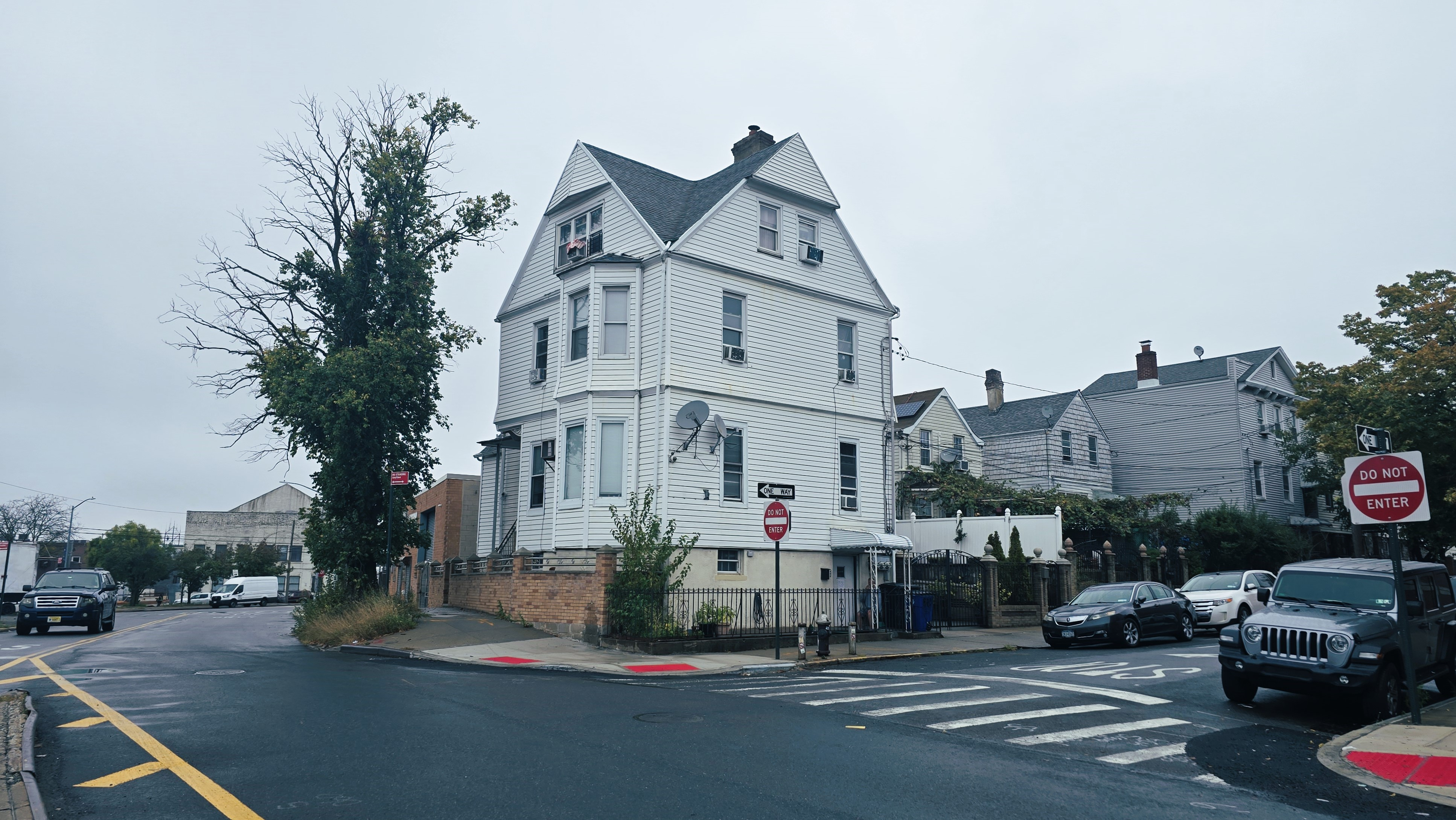
The Maurice Homestead 1 Hill St. 2024

On the front yard of the Church of the Transfiguration on Perry Avenue, a replica of a Lithuanian roadside shrine has stood since 1981.

St. Saviour's Church, built in 1847 at Rust Street and 57th Drive, was located on land formerly owned by lawyer and politician James Maurice. After a 1970 arson, it was cleaned up. However, by 2005, developers bought the church in order to demolish it, since the New York City Landmarks Preservation Commission had refused to landmark the church. This was largely opposed; however, its facade was torn apart, disassembled, and stored at All Faiths Cemetery by 2008. Despite community effort, led by the Juniper Park Civic Association, to make a park on the site, by 2011, the church's former site had become warehouses, while provisions for a new site for the church in All Faiths Cemetery had been approved.

The Ridgewood Gardens apartment/co-op complex, on a hill known as the Ridgewood Plateau, was built on 72 acres (29 ha) woods owned by James Maurice and donated to the Episcopal Church in 1850. Maurice Woods was bounded by Maurice Avenue, Jay Avenue, 66th Street, and Borden Avenue. 53rd Avenue went down a slope to 64th Street. The apartment complex was built later. It is notable for a step street that descends the hill, as well as for a very old, graffiti-covered lamppost on that street.

James Maurice used to live at a home at 1 Hill Street. It was sold in 1909.

The house where Anton Fausner's wheelwright and wagonmaker's shop was located is on Grand Avenue just south of the LIE. Later, an auto shop, Maspeth Auto Parts, was located in that building. In 2006, that house was torn down and replaced by a bank. The wheelwright was patronized by farmers from Long Island who stayed at the Queens County Hotel, built in 1851 along Grand Avenue, on their way to the markets.

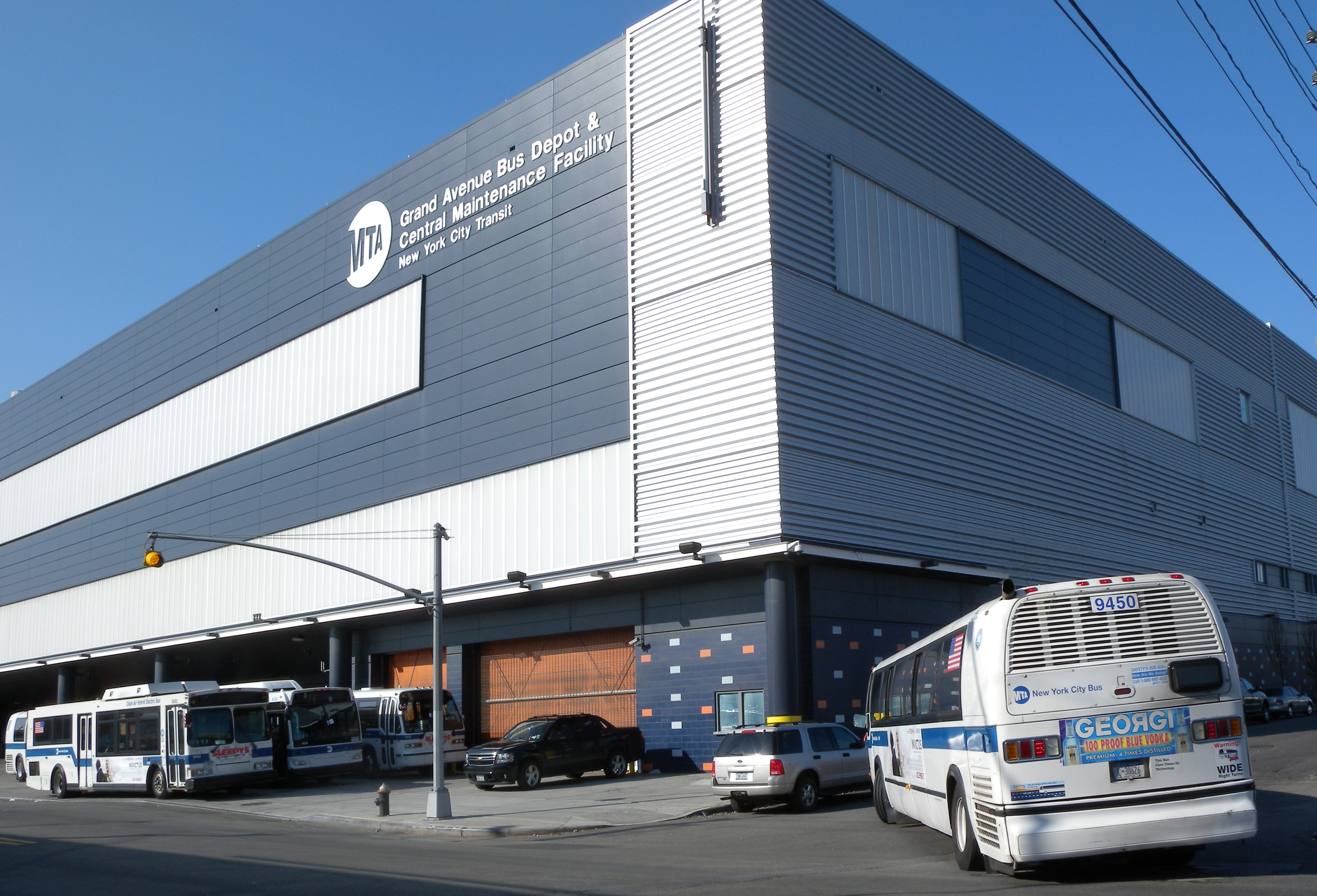
MTA bus depot

The Maspeth Theater, the neighborhood's largest theater in the 1920s, was built in 1924 at Grand Avenue and 69th Street by Straus and Strausberg, with 1,161 seats. It was owned by three companies before closing in 1965. Notable performers included Judy Garland. There were also many other theaters in Maspeth in the 1920s.

A former Maspeth supermarket, Wielback's Grocery—one of the oldest in the area—then became Griff's Hardware. In 2000, the building became Griff's Laundry, a laundromat that closed less than ten years later and was slated for demolition. The building was notable for a neon sign on its facade.

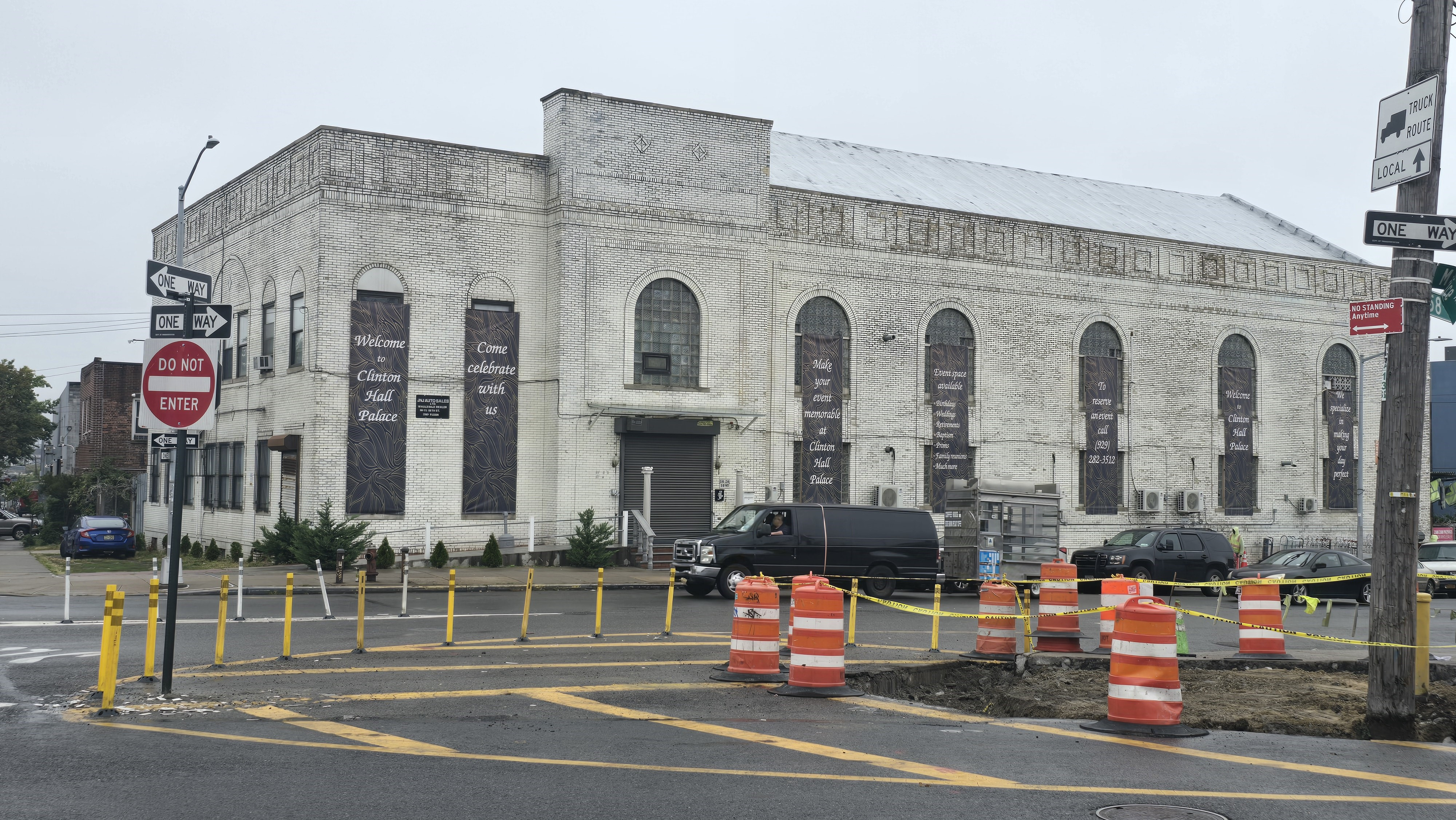
Clinton Hall Palace in 2024

At Clinton Hall, a 1920s-built venue that had interior balconies and a large chandelier, there is now a laboratory and industrial offices. It is named after a mansion built by Judge Joseph Sackett. Sackett had built a wood-framed mansion behind the hall; later, New York Governor DeWitt Clinton planned the Erie Canal. The lands of the Sackett-Clinton House, as the mansion was called, were turned into a park by 1910, and the mansion burned down in 1933.

The Clinton Diner, at Maspeth and Maurice Avenues, was built in 1935 and appeared in the movie Goodfellas among others films. The diner was destroyed by fire in 2018. The Queens Head Tavern, nearby, was an American Revolutionary War-era tavern and was used as a stagecoach stop later on.

=== Notable streets ===
- Fresh Pond Road goes south to Myrtle Avenue and was named after a former pond named "Fresh Pond".
- Flushing Avenue goes west to downtown Brooklyn.
- Grand Avenue used to be a winding road before being straightened.
- Maspeth Avenue is discontinuous in the area because of the Newtown Creek and because of the location of the former Maspeth tanks.
- Maspeth Plank Road, a no-longer-extant road made of planks of wood, went from Williamsburg to Newtown, and crossed the English Kills.
- Melvina Place, off Maspeth Avenue, is named after a small section of Maspeth, which was to the east of the approximate intersection of Maspeth Plank Road and Rust Street.
- North Hempstead Plank Road, present-day 57th Avenue, split off of Grand Avenue at Mazeau Street and extended to Corona; the road was named after North Hempstead, New York, now in Nassau County, which split from Queens in 1898. 57th Avenue has a lot of old houses dating from the 1850s, as well as some former barns that were later repurposed for other uses, such as for garages.

== Education ==
Maspeth and Ridgewood generally have a lower rate of college-educated residents than the rest of the city as of 2018. While 33% of residents age 25 and older have a college education or higher, 16% have less than a high school education and 50% are high school graduates or have some college education. By contrast, 39% of Queens residents and 43% of city residents have a college education or higher. The percentage of Maspeth and Ridgewood students excelling in math rose from 36% in 2000 to 67% in 2011, and reading achievement rose from 42% to 49% during the same time period.

Maspeth and Ridgewood's rate of elementary school student absenteeism is less than the rest of New York City. In Maspeth and Ridgewood, 14% of elementary school students missed twenty or more days per school year, lower than the citywide average of 20%. Additionally, 82% of high school students in Maspeth and Ridgewood graduate on time, more than the citywide average of 75%.

=== Schools ===
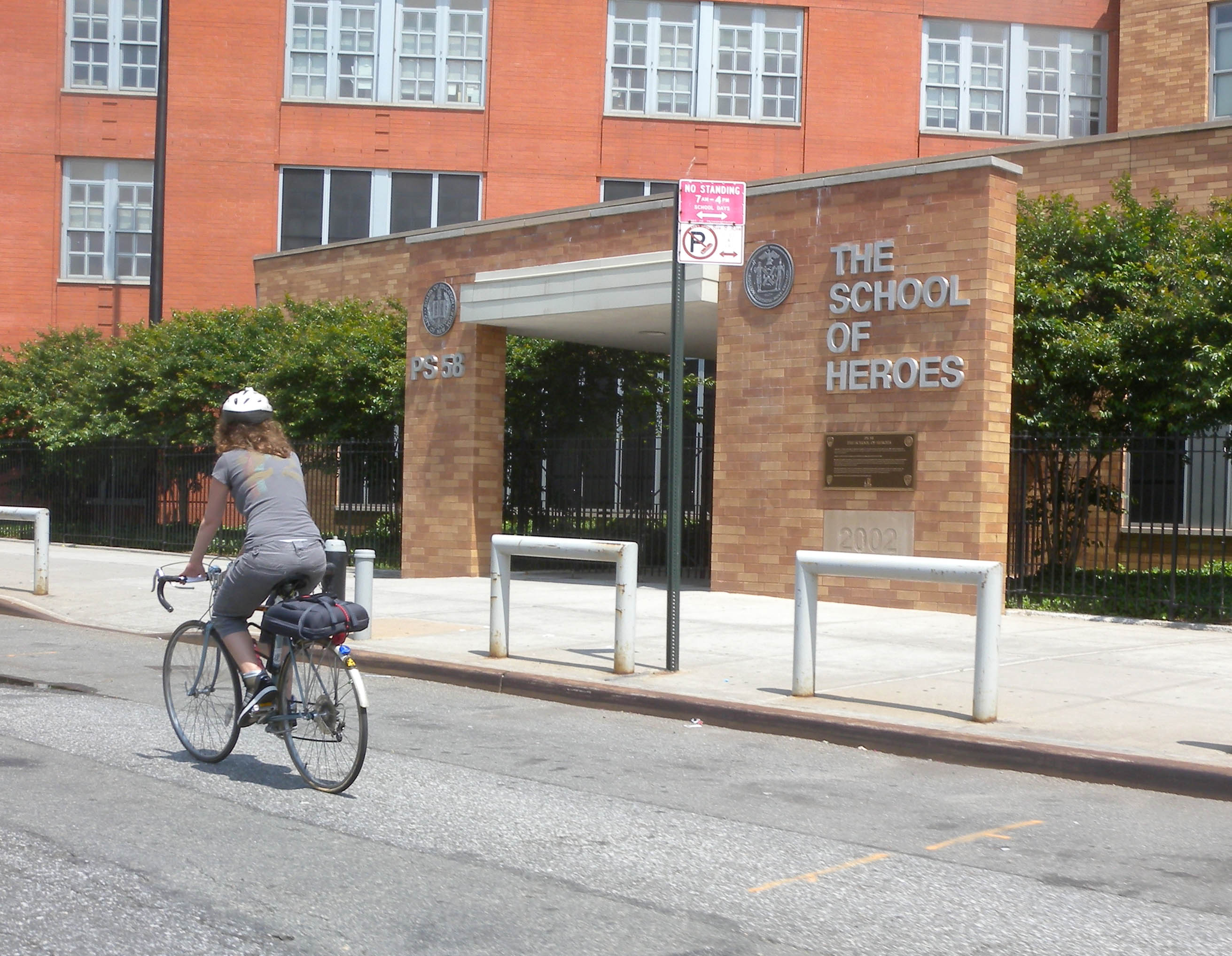
PS 58

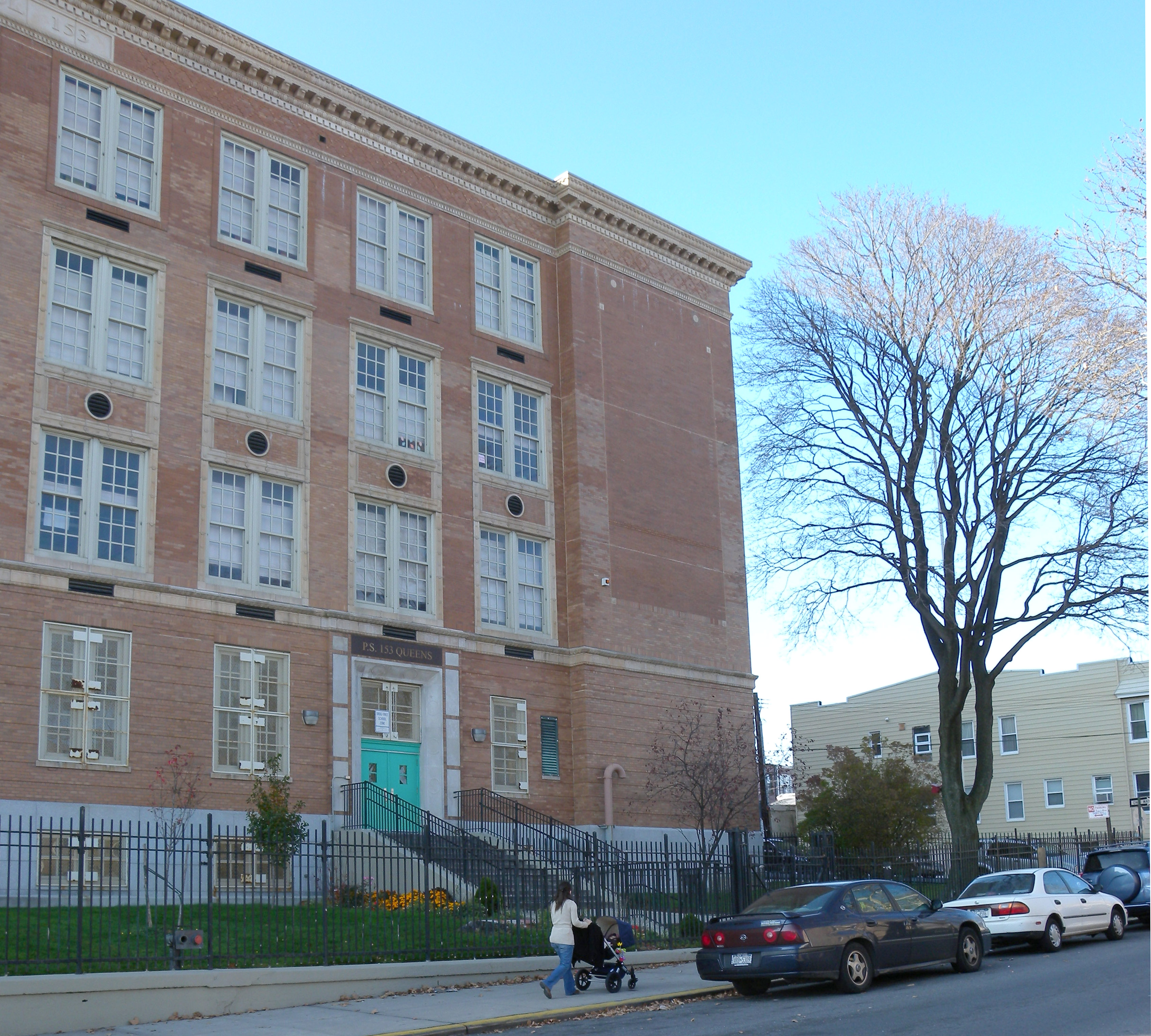
PS 153

New York City Department of Education operates public schools.

- IS 73, The Frank Sansivieri Intermediate School, is a zoned middle school.
- PS 58, The School of Heroes, was dedicated in 2002 in honor of the victims of the September 11 attacks at the site of the original Finast supermarket. It is named one of the best schools in Maspeth for its wide range of extracurricular activities and programs.
- PS 153, Maspeth Elementary School. The school has Dual Language Program (DL) for students who want to learn Polish.
- Maspeth High School is the first public high school in Maspeth. It opened on September 6, 2012. It was originally located in Middle Village.

Private schools in the area include:

- Holy Cross R.C. Church—Maspeth: Polish School and CCD classes on the weekends.
- Saint Stanislaus Kostka School (Nursery–8 Catholic School under the auspices of the Roman Catholic Diocese of Brooklyn)
- Martin Luther High School (9–12 private school)

=== Library ===
The Queens Public Library's Maspeth branch is located at 69–70 Grand Avenue.

== Transportation ==
Maspeth is devoid of direct transit connections to Manhattan, as there are no New York City Subway stations and no express bus stops in Maspeth. The Middle Village-Metropolitan Avenue station is served by the M train in Middle Village, bordering the southeast corner of Maspeth.

Local buses provide connections to the subway, but off-peak service on these buses is often unreliable. Local bus routes include:

- B57 bus along Flushing Avenue
- Q14 bus along Eliot Avenue
- Q18 bus along primarily 65th Place and 69th Street
- Q38 bus along Penelope Avenue
- Q39 bus along primarily 58th Street, Grand Avenue, and Fresh Pond Road
- Q47 bus along Calamus Avenue and 69th Street
- Westbound Q54 bus along Metropolitan Avenue
- Q58 and Q98 buses along Grand Avenue and Fresh Pond Road
- Q59 bus along Grand Avenue
- Q67 bus along primarily Metropolitan Avenue, 69th Street, and the Long Island Expressway

Maspeth is also home to the Grand Avenue Bus Depot, serving lots of interborough routes with a decent battery-electric fleet.

The proposed Interborough Express light metro line is slated to serve Maspeth using the tracks on the LIRR Bay Ridge Branch at the Grand Avenue station near 74th Street, which will provide connections to the subway at Roosevelt Avenue in Jackson Heights one station away. Another stop is proposed at Eliot Avenue on the eastern border with Middle Village.

The narrow Grand Street Bridge carries Grand Street eastward across the English Kills and Newtown Creek from Williamsburg where it becomes Grand Avenue, Maspeth's main street for dining and business. Grand Avenue continues eastward to end at Queens Boulevard in Elmhurst. There is also access to I-278, the Brooklyn-Queens Expressway and I-495, the Long Island Expressway. The former crosses the Newtown Creek on the Kosciuszko Bridge.

== Notable people ==
- Juan Ardila, member of the New York State Assembly
- June Blum (1929–2017), artist
- Hermine Braunsteiner (1919–1999), female camp guard at Ravensbrück and Majdanek concentration camps; first Nazi war criminal to be extradited from the United States to face trial in Germany
- Donald Honig (born 1931), Author who focuses on baseball
- Joe Massino (1943–2023) former boss of the Bonanno crime family
- John J. Pesch (1921–2010), national director of the Air National Guard from 1974 to 1977
- Vincent Piazza (born 1976), film, television, and stage actor best known for his roles in Boardwalk Empire, Rocket Science, and as Tommy DeVito in the film adaptation of Jersey Boys
- Philip Rastelli (1918–1991), mobster and former boss of the Bonanno crime family
- Jimmy Ring (1895–1965), Major League Baseball player
- John Seery (born 1941), artist
- Richard Vetere (born 1952), playwright and author of The Third Miracle
