= Bushwick station =

Train station in New York City (1876–1924)

Bushwick

General information
- Location: Bushwick Avenue and Montrose Avenue; East Williamsburg, Brooklyn
- Coordinates: 40.707877°N 73.938495°W
- Line: Bushwick Branch
- Platforms: 1 side platform
- Tracks: 1

History
- Opened: July 18, 1868
- Closed: May 13, 1924

Former services
Preceding station	Long Island Rail Road	Following station
Terminus	Bushwick Branch	Metropolitan Avenue toward Bushwick Junction
South Eighth Street Terminus	Bushwick Branch before 1876	Metropolitan Avenue toward Bushwick Junction
Location

Bushwick, also known as Bushwick Terminal, was a train station along the Bushwick Branch, and terminal of the Bushwick Branch of the Long Island Rail Road from February 29, 1876, to May 13, 1924. Bushwick Terminal was located at Montrose Avenue and Bushwick Avenue in East Williamsburg, Brooklyn. It opened on July 18, 1868, and closed in 1924 with the end of passenger service on the Bushwick Branch. Steam engines served the station until 1913. The station building made in brick survived until recently and was the last vestige of the passenger terminal of the Bushwick Branch. Before it was demolished, the building was used as an automobile repair shop. The terminal building was replaced by a building that was in the process of being built in October 2007, and holds trucks.

== Bushwick Yard ==
Bushwick Yard consisted of 13 tracks, and one run around track. One of the tracks led to Bushwick Terminal. Currently the site is mostly occupied by a lumber yard, and is blocked off from the rest of the Bushwick Branch by a fence. Most of the tracks in the yard have been covered up by asphalt.

At Bushwick Place and Johnson Avenue, there was the Long Island Rail Road Bushwick Freight Terminal. It was abandoned by the LIRR and was leased out for other uses, including a meat packing facility, and most recently, to a manufacturer of styrofoam coolers as a warehouse for styrofoam pellets. The roof had collapsed following a fire set by the resident homeless in May 2003. The building had been completely disused for about twenty years, but was still full of bags of styrofoam pellets at the time of demolition. The former LIRR freight office on Bushwick Place still stands.

In 1924, a temporary connection was built from Bushwick Yard that ran via Montrose Avenue and then connected to the New York City Subway's BMT Canarsie Line (L train) under Bushwick Avenue, just near the Montrose Avenue station. This was done in order for the delivery of new BMT Standard subway cars for the then-isolated Canarsie Line. The first of the cars were delivered by this ramp on June 18, 1924, and passenger service on the BMT Canarsie Line began on September 21 the same year.

== See also ==
- Bushwick Branch
- Long Island Rail Road
