= Metropolitan Avenue station (LIRR) =

Train station in New York City (closed 1924)

Metropolitan Avenue

General information
- Location: Metropolitan Avenue near Woodward Avenue; Maspeth, Queens, New York
- Coordinates: 40°42′49.4″N 73°55′10″W
- Line: Bushwick Branch
- Platforms: 1 side platform
- Tracks: 2

History
- Closed: May 13, 1924

Former services
Preceding station	Long Island Rail Road	Following station
Bushwick Terminus	Bushwick Branch	Bushwick Junction Terminus
Location

Metropolitan Avenue was a train station along the Bushwick Branch of the Long Island Rail Road, located at Metropolitan Avenue near Woodward Avenue in Maspeth, Queens. Its opening date is unknown but it closed with the end of passenger service on the Bushwick Branch on May 13, 1924 and was removed afterwards. Right next to the station is one of the level crossings in New York City.

== See also ==
- Bushwick Branch
- Long Island Rail Road
