= Mespeatches =

Native American tribe

The Mespeatches were one of 13 Native American tribes who lived on Long Island, New York at the time of European contact.

The town of Maspeth, New York was named for the tribe. Their name "Mespeatches" translates as "an inundating tidal river," as determined by William Wallace Tooker.

The former Mespeatche village is located on the high ground east of the Mount Zion Cemetery in Maspeth.
