= Bushwick Branch =

Long Island Rail Road freight branch in New York City

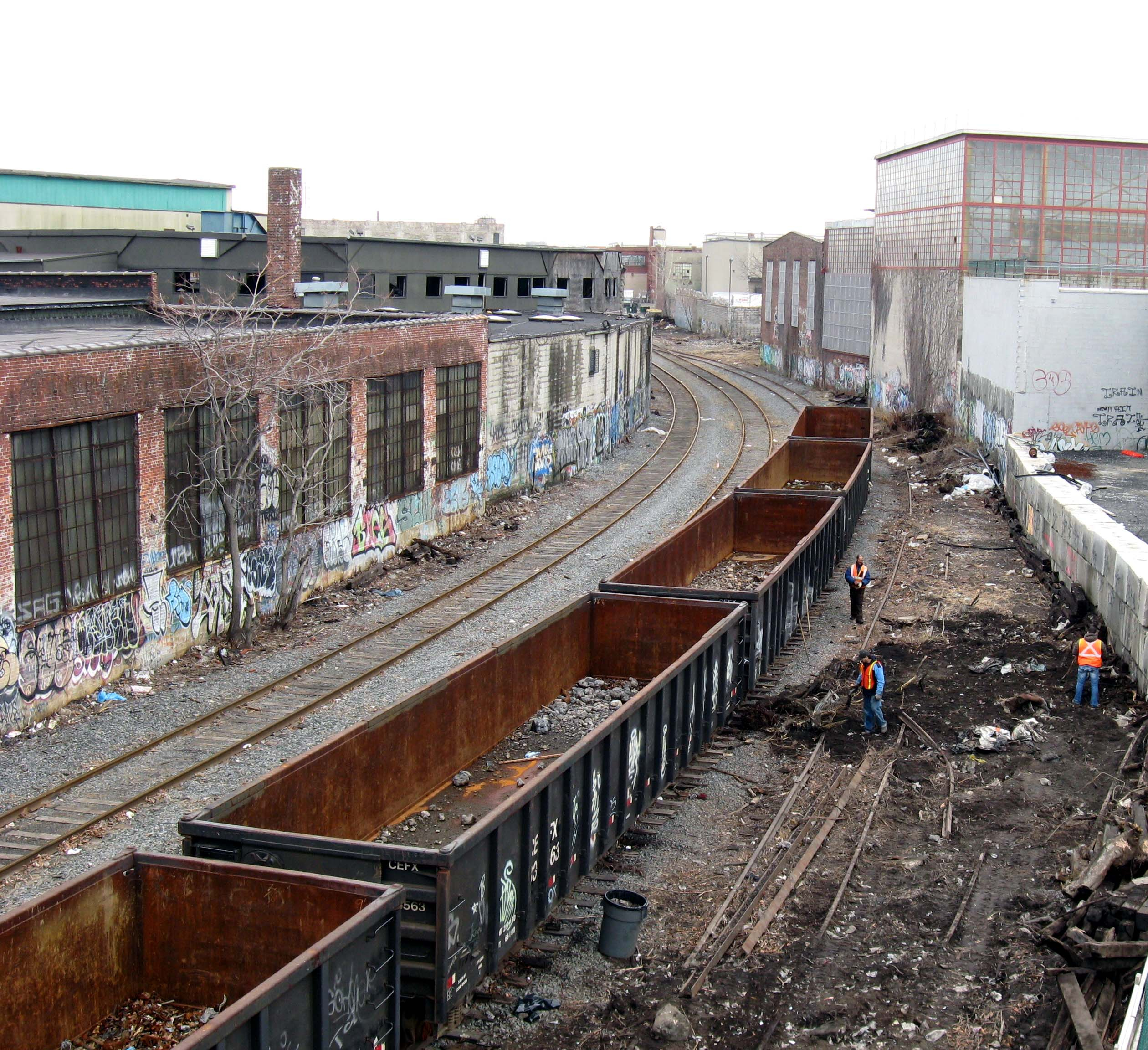
- In Bushwick

Overview
- Status: Active in freight service
- Owner: Long Island Rail Road
- Locale: Brooklyn and Queens, New York
- Coordinates: 40°43′N 73°54′W
- Termini: South Eighth Street; Bushwick Junction
- Stations: 6

Service
- System: Long Island Rail Road
- Operator(s): New York and Atlantic Railway

History
- Opened: 1868

Technical
- Line length: 2 miles (3.2 km)
- Number of tracks: 2
- Track gauge: 4 ft 8 1/2 in (1,435 mm) standard gauge

The Bushwick Branch, also known as the Bushwick Lead Track, is a freight railroad branch in New York City. It runs from the East Williamsburg neighborhood of Brooklyn to Fresh Pond Junction in the Glendale neighborhood of Queens, where it connects with the Montauk Branch of the Long Island Rail Road. It is owned by the LIRR but operated under lease by the New York and Atlantic Railway, which took over LIRR freight operations in May 1997.

== History ==
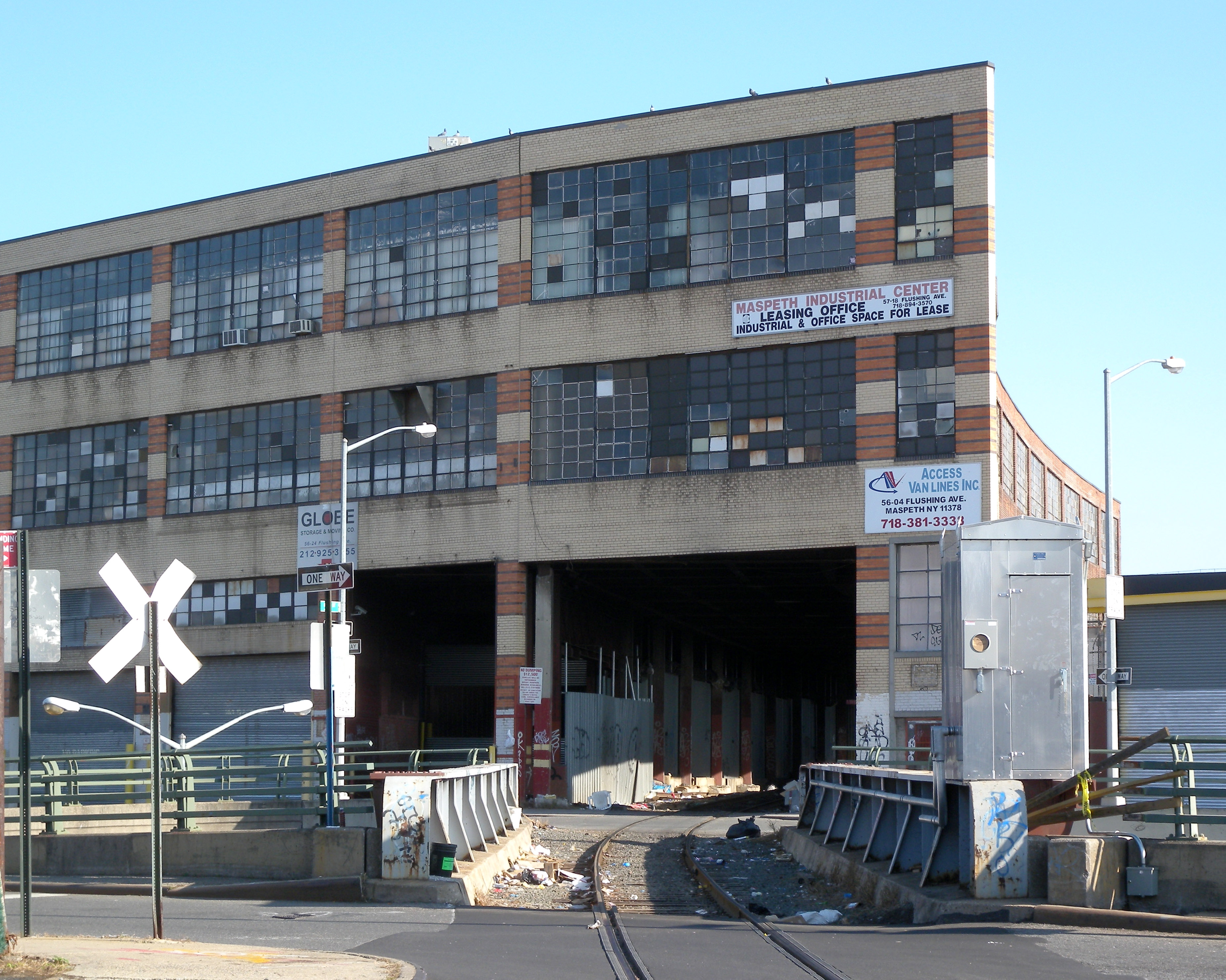
Crossing over Flushing Avenue in Maspeth

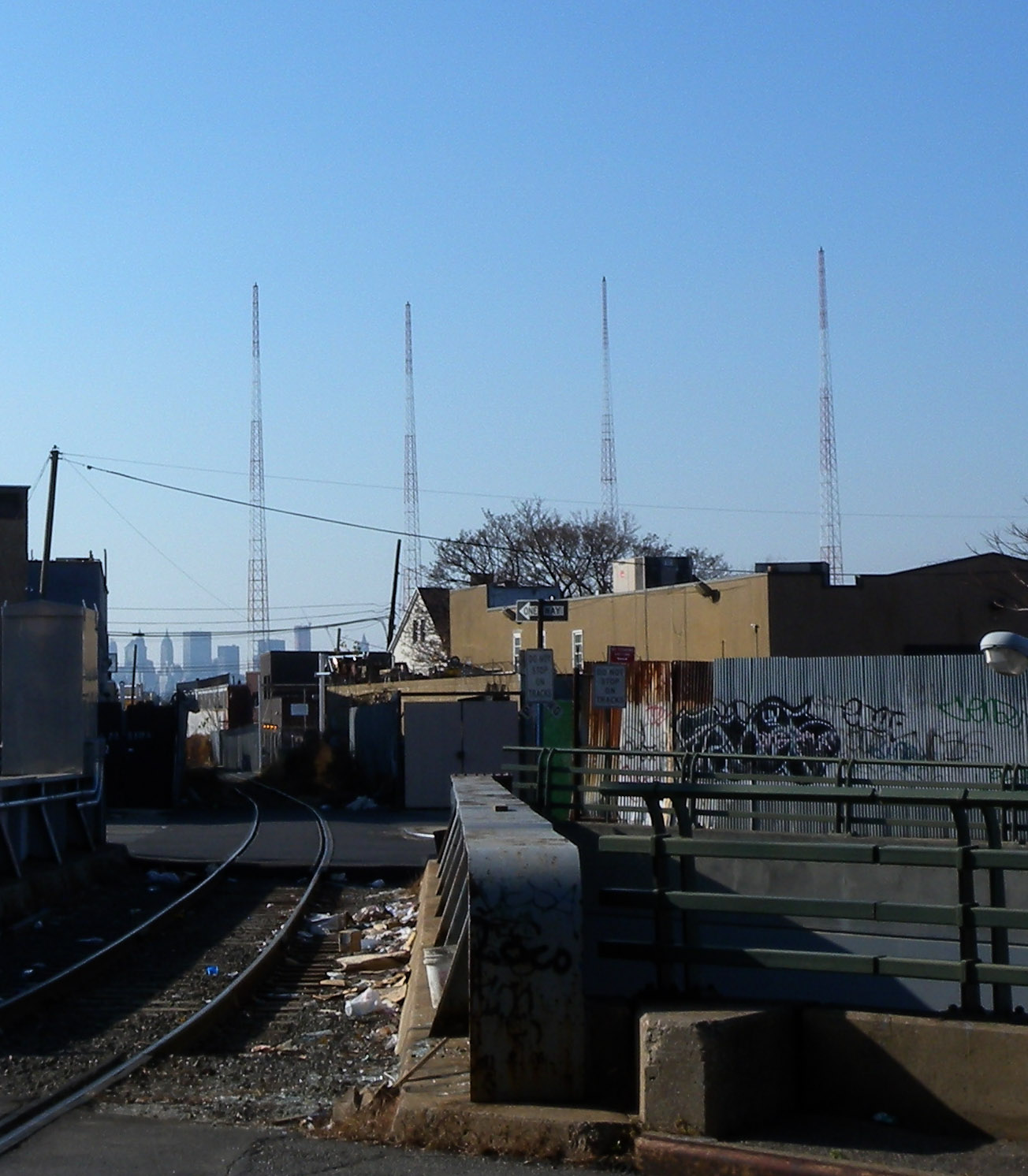
Looking west at the Flushing Avenue overpass

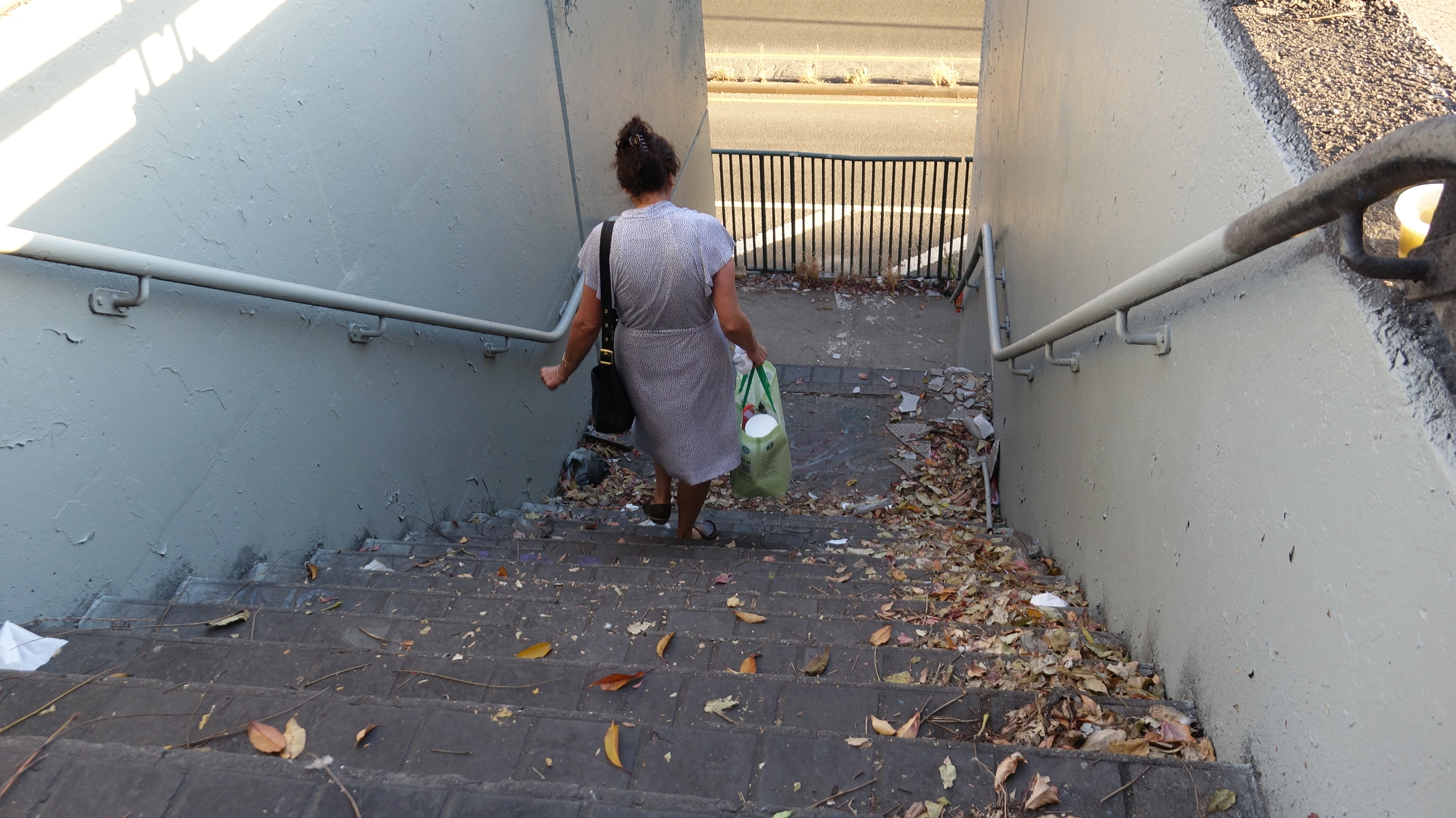
the Bushwick branch intersects Flushing Ave and requires using stairs to cross it

The Bushwick Branch dates back to the South Side Railroad of Long Island. The South Side had been chartered on March 23, 1860 to build a railroad from Jamaica, Queens, all the way to Islip along the south shore of Long Island. The South Side sought to build a line west of Jamaica to the East River so its passengers could connect to ferries that would take them into Manhattan.

The South Side originally wanted to build to Long Island City, and tried to buy out the interest of the New York and Flushing Railroad, a small competitor to the FNSRR. However, the LIRR, which was also looking for access to Long Island City, beat out the South Side bid for the New York and Flushing and bought it out instead. Thus, the only recourse for the South Side was to build a line from Jamaica to Fresh Pond, Queens, and then southwest into Bushwick.

On July 18, 1868, service on the branch began running to Bushwick, and on November 4 to the East River at the South Eighth Street station in Williamsburg, where passengers would take a ferry into Manhattan. Due to a local ordinance, steam locomotives were restricted in the vicinity; so horses pulled trains from the Bushwick Depot to the East River Ferry Terminal in 1868. Steam dummy engines (steam locomotives with a carbody covering) pulled trains from Bushwick Depot to East River Ferry Terminal between 1869 and 1873. The two main railroad routes leading to the East River ferry terminals were along Atlantic Avenue in Brooklyn, a route owned by the LIRR, and in Long Island City, a route owned by the Flushing and North Side Railroad (FNSRR). To provide a marine freight terminal, in the summer of 1869, a spur was built to the Newtown Creek at Furman's Island, which today is connected by landfill to the rest of Brooklyn.

The LIRR service to Long Island City via the old New York and Flushing route was not well run and disliked by the public. Most chose the far superior Long Island City service offered by the Flushing and North Side Railroad. The LIRR abandoned its Long Island City service and sold its tracks east of Winfield, Queens, to the FNSRR. The rest of the route west of Winfield to Long Island City remained unused. Seeking an opportunity, the South Side decided to buy up the remaining tracks in 1872, and extended service west from Fresh Pond to Maspeth along Newtown Creek and on to Long Island City, thus gaining a new terminal on the East River (this line today is referred to by the LIRR as the Lower Montauk). However, the South Side only used this new line for freight service, due to the competing passenger service offered by FNSRR. Passenger trains still ran through Bushwick to Williamsburg.

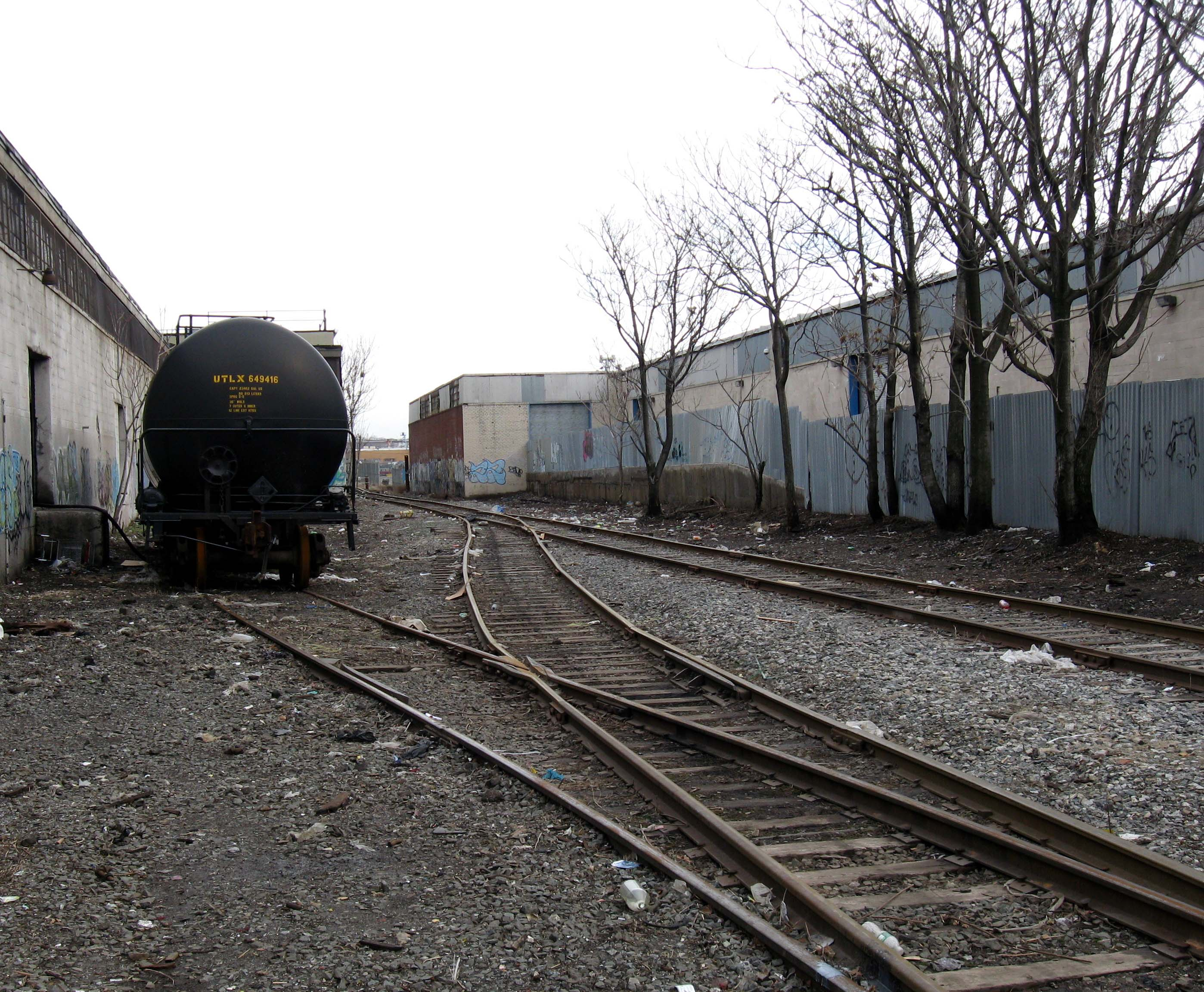
Bushwick Branch

In 1874, the South Side, along with other railroads on Long Island such as the Central Railroad of Long Island and the FNSRR, came under control of wealthy local rubber baron Conrad Poppenhusen. The South Side was reorganized as the Southern Railroad of Long Island. By 1876, Poppenhusen also took control of the LIRR. Seeing the LIRR as the most formidable of his newly acquired railroads, he began to consolidate the competing roads into the LIRR. The LIRR thus gained the FNSRR tracks to Long Island City, making it the primary route for passengers and freight looking to reach Manhattan. The LIRR Atlantic Avenue line was cut back from South Ferry, Brooklyn, to a terminal at Flatbush Avenue, where passengers could transfer to the Fifth Avenue Elevated (and after 1910 the IRT subway) to reach Manhattan, thereby making Flatbush Avenue a secondary terminal for the LIRR. In 1876, most of the lines of the ex-Southern, referred to as the old Southern Road division, were immediately rerouted to Long Island City via the Lower Montauk branch; full integration of the old-Southern Road division with the LIRR Main Line would not be achieved until the Jamaica station improvement project of 1912-13. The ex-Southern line between Bushwick and Williamsburg was abandoned and cut back to a terminal at Bushwick. By the 1880s, Poppenhusen's successor Austin Corbin had successfully consolidated all the railroads. The Bushwick Branch, much like the Atlantic Branch to Flatbush Avenue, acted as a second terminal for the LIRR; however, it offered no convenient transit connections into other parts of Brooklyn and Manhattan.

The line was double-tracked in 1868, then reduced to a single track in 1876, but double-tracked again in 1892. In 1877, a station house was built at Bushwick station.

Heavy industry in the area saw much use for the line in freight service, while the many industrial jobs in Bushwick warranted passenger commuter service for workers traveling to factories in the area. Nevertheless, the Bushwick Branch became a less and less important terminal, and the increasing prevalence of cars, as well as the fact of the branch had no direct transit connections into Manhattan, caused the branch's main passenger trade to begin to dwindle. By the early 1900s, LIRR began a series of electrification and grade elimination projects for its routes throughout Brooklyn and Queens. While its Main Line, Montauk Branch, Rockaway Beach Branch, and Atlantic Branch received these improvements, the Bushwick did not. By 1913, steam trains were eliminated along the line and replaced with battery-powered electric multiple-unit trains that were also used on the West Hempstead Branch. These trains ran from Bushwick Junction to Bushwick. The last timetable to show this passenger service is from October 1923. Timetables from the era show fewer and fewer trains leaving from Bushwick Terminal. On May 13, 1924, passenger service was completely discontinued.

== Current operations ==
Despite the end of passenger service, limited freight service continues on the line. The Bushwick Branch was downgraded to a secondary freight track, most often referred to as the Bushwick Lead Track, and is accessed via LIRR's Fresh Pond Yard. The branch is mostly single-track with a few passing sidings.

In May 1997, all freight traffic on the LIRR was privatized and contracted out to the New York and Atlantic Railway, which leased the Fresh Pond Yard and the Bushwick Branch. The original Bushwick passenger terminal from the days of passenger trains was demolished only in 2005. Most freight traffic on the line today is garbage collection and transfer from factories in the area. This and the branch's limited use often cause the right of way to be littered with trash. The branch is between 16 feet (4.9 m) and 100 feet (30 m) wide. In addition, the branch had become overgrown due to lack of use: a writer for The New York Times in 1993, riding on a Bushwick Branch train with a top speed of 10 miles per hour (16 km/h), said that the train "rocked on the antique, uneven tracks like a ship at sea".

== 2004 runaway engine incident ==
The Bushwick Branch has seven active grade crossings (the busiest is Metropolitan Avenue) along its route as of 2024, all of which are unprotected. This requires flag protection from train crews to safeguard motorists when movements are made through the crossing. Originally the crossings had crossing gate protection; however, due to the limited use of the line, they were deemed unnecessary and removed in 1990. The unprotected crossings restrict the trains and light engines to 10 MPH.

On March 10, 2004, an LIRR engine, EMD MP15AC #165, undergoing a quick turnaround switching move became uncoupled from two other engines, rolled down a slight incline in the Fresh Pond Yard and entered the Bushwick Branch. While passing through the unprotected crossings, the engine struck several vehicles, seriously injuring four motorists. The National Transportation Safety Board and Federal Railroad Administration investigation into the incident revealed that the engine's air brakes had failed, causing it to break loose and roll away. Parking brakes had not been applied due to the expected quick turnaround of the engines. The NTSB and FRA now mandate that air and parking brakes be applied to all engines or trains laying idle, regardless of the length of time that they will be laid up. The report also suggested that the pavement along each of the crossings be repaved to allow both trains and street traffic to move over the crossings more gently. In addition, they recommended that more advanced railroad crossing signs, and eventually crossing gates, be installed along the branch to protect motorists.

The MTA made major changes to the Bushwick Branch, replacing wooden crossbucks with flashing lights on overhead gantries at the Metropolitan Avenue crossing and only the crossbucks on a large pole seen at all other crossings on the branch.

== Station list ==
Station	Date opened	Date closed	Notes
South Eighth Street	November 4, 1868	February 29, 1876	Located at South Eighth Street and Kent Avenue and on one timetable is listed as South Seventh Street Former connection to Roosevelt Street Ferry
Bushwick	July 18, 1868	May 13, 1924	Located at Bushwick Avenue and Montrose Avenue; terminal station 1876-1924. Also known as Bushwick Avenue.
South Side Railroad Crossing	May 16, 1878 June 1886	May 25, 1881 1890	Crossing with Evergreen Branch near Varick Avenue
Metropolitan Avenue	Unknown	May 13, 1924	East of Woodward Avenue
Hebbard's	May 1870	August 1870	Named for a farmhouse at Flushing Avenue and 52nd Street; station still shown on an 1873 map
Bushwick Junction	1869	March 16, 1998	Located at Metropolitan Avenue and Fresh Pond Road; Later named Fresh Pond, formerly on the Lower Montauk Branch
