= Elmhurst Park =

Public park in Queens, New York

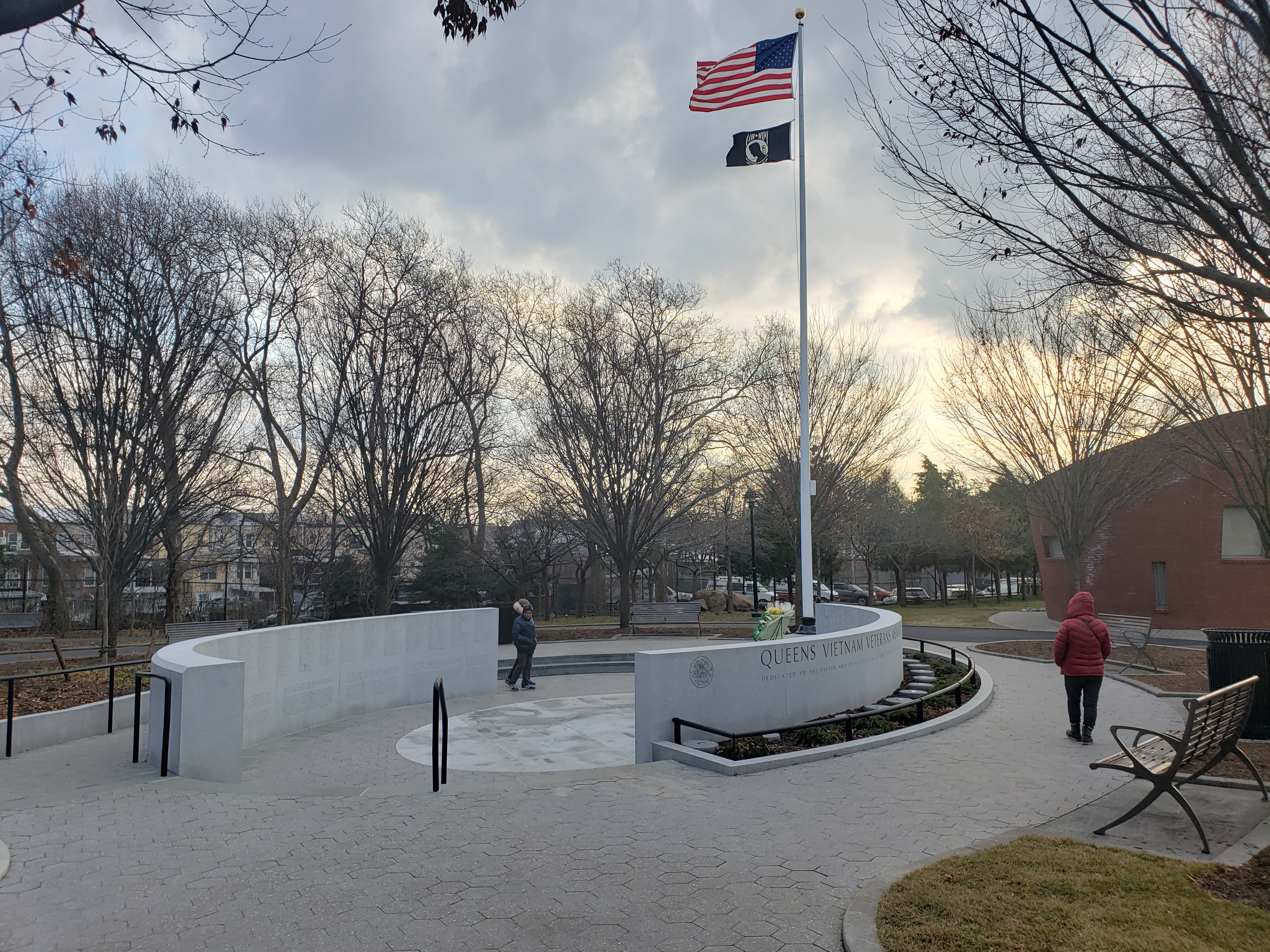
- Looking toward the Queens Vietnam Veterans Memorial from Grand Avenue
- Interactive map of Elmhurst Park
- Type: Urban park
- Location: Elmhurst, Queens, New York City
- Coordinates: 40°43′47.27″N 73°53′7.84″W
- Area: 6.22 acres (2.52 ha)
- Created: May 24, 2011
- Operator: New York City Department of Parks and Recreation
- Website: Elmhurst Park

Elmhurst Park is a 6.22-acre (2.52 ha) public park located in Elmhurst, Queens, New York City. The site was formerly home to the Elmhurst gas tanks (officially the Newtown Holder Station), a pair of large natural gas storage gasometers that were 200 feet (61 m) tall. The area is bordered on the south by 57th Avenue and the Long Island Expressway, on the north by Grand Avenue, on the west by the CSX-operated Fremont Secondary, and on the east by 80th Street. The park is owned and operated by the New York City Department of Parks and Recreation.

== Gas tanks ==
Built between 1910 and 1921, the gas tanks were built to hold gas. Until the 1960s, the gas tanks had been maintained by an inspector using a rowboat. Due to the increasing prevalence of much more compact gas cylinders, Brooklyn Union Gas began dismantling the gas tanks in 1996.

Because the Long Island Expressway frequently became congested in that area, "backup at the Elmhurst Gas Tanks" became a familiar phrase in radio traffic reporting. Having been literal rather than legal landmarks, the two huge gas holders were completely removed by 2001.

== Park ==
Construction on the $20 million park, spearheaded by former Mayor Michael Bloomberg, started in 2007. On May 24, 2011, the Elmhurst Park was opened on the former site of the gas tanks. The park contained state-of-the-art facilities including benches, lighting, lawns, and jogging paths, in addition to a playground and more than 620 trees. The six-acre (2.4 ha) park's bathrooms were delayed greatly, however. Having opened in September 2012, the restroom facilities were stylish and spacious, although highly controversial; they drew wide criticism due to their $2.3 million cost.

The Queens Vietnam Veterans Memorial, a $2.85 million memorial to Vietnam War veterans, at the northeastern corner of Elmhurst Park, was announced in June 2017. Although planning and fundraising started in the mid-2000s, construction started in December 2018. The memorial was dedicated the following December. The semicircular memorial features the names of 371 Queens residents who died while fighting in the war.
