= Fresh Pond, Queens =

Neighborhood in New York City

Coordinates: 40.7126°N 73.9005°W

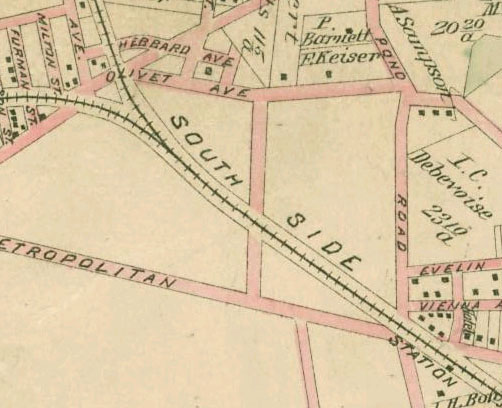
1891 map. Freshwater ponds were located in the upper right quadrant of the picture, near the intersection of Fresh Pond Road and Mount Olivet Avenue (now Mount Olivet Crescent).

Fresh Pond was a small middle class neighborhood in the New York City borough of Queens, separated from Juniper Valley by the Lutheran and Mount Olivet cemeteries. In present day, it is now considered part of the surrounding neighborhoods of Maspeth, Middle Village, Glendale, and Ridgewood (its neighbors to the northwest, northeast, southeast, and southwest, respectively) and is no longer referred to by the name "Fresh Pond." The area was originally named for two freshwater ponds that, in the early 1900s, were filled in. Other ponds were lower, and brackish due to Newtown Creek being estuarine.

Its main streets, Fresh Pond Road, Metropolitan Avenue, Eliot Avenue and 61st Street, meet at the community's commercial center. Fresh Pond is served by the Fresh Pond Road and Metropolitan Avenue stations of the BMT Myrtle Avenue Line (M train) of the New York City Subway. It is also the home of the Fresh Pond Depot for MTA New York City Bus. A former Long Island Rail Road freight station of the Montauk Branch and the Fresh Pond Yard lie east of the corner of Metropolitan Avenue and Fresh Pond Road. The freight only Bushwick Branch of the LIRR branches off below (west of) the Fresh Pond yard before crossing Flushing Avenue. Freight cars interchange here with the New York Connecting Railroad including those from Bay Ridge and the New York Cross Harbor Railroad.

Fresh Pond Road has existed for centuries. During the American Revolutionary War, British forces pursued the American military along Fresh Pond Road.
