= East Williamsburg, Brooklyn =

Neighborhood in New York City

East Williamsburg
- Neighborhood of Brooklyn
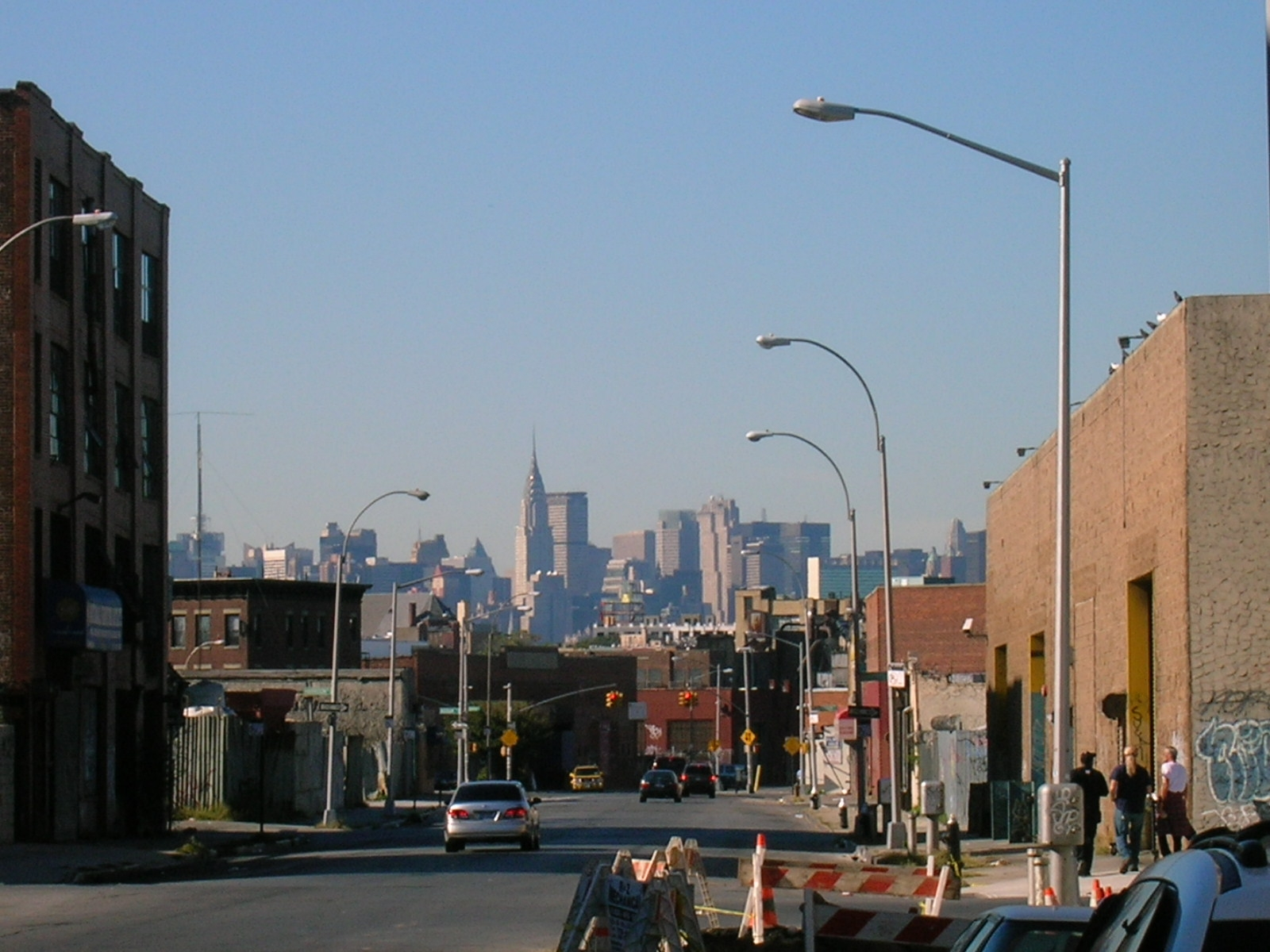
- Knickerbocker Avenue looking north at Thames Street
- Location in New York City
- Coordinates: 40.714°N 73.939°W
- Country: United States
- State: New York
- City: New York City
- Borough: Brooklyn

Area
  - Total: 1.40 sq mi (3.6 km^{2})

Population
  - Total: 34,158
  - Density: 24,400/sq mi (9,420/km^{2})

Ethnicity
  - White: 43.1%
  - Black: 9.3%
  - Hispanic: 32.7%
  - Asian: 12.7%
  - Other: 0.3%
- ZIP Codes: 11206, 11237, 11211, 11222
- Area codes: 718, 347, 929, and 917

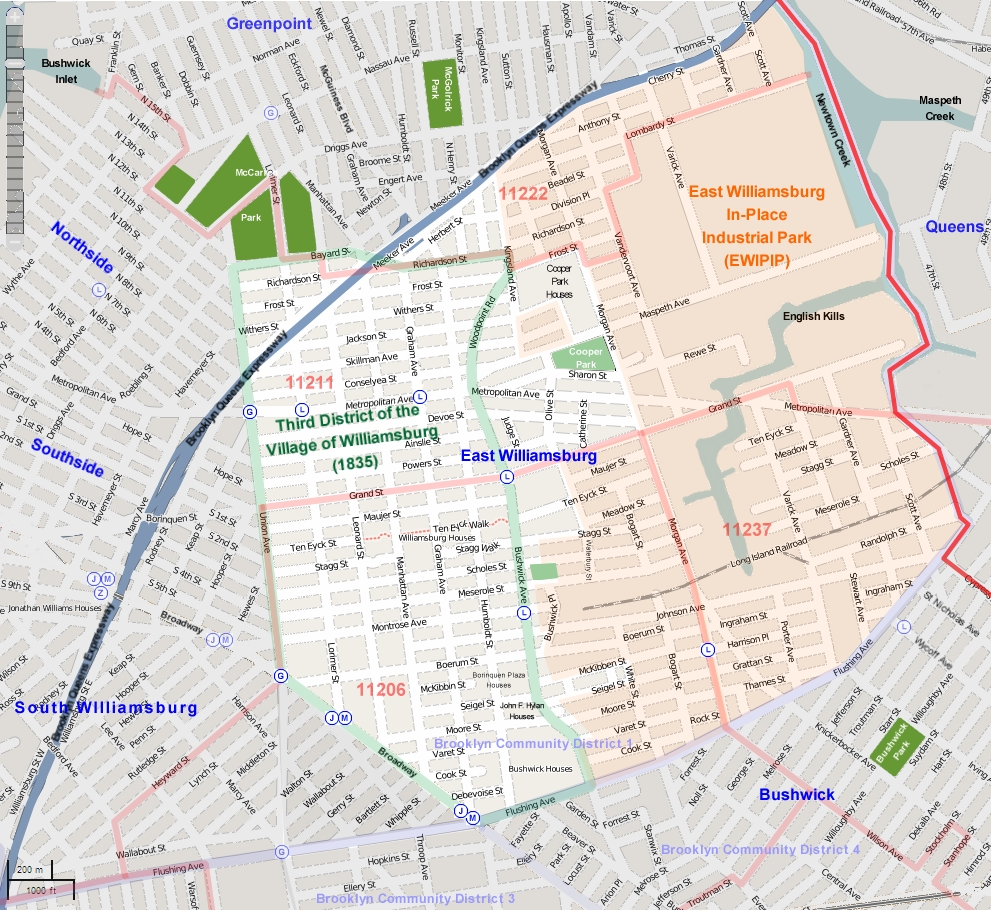
The boundaries of East Williamsburg as noted on a map

East Williamsburg is a neighborhood in the northwestern portion of Brooklyn, New York City, United States. East Williamsburg consists roughly of what was the 3rd District of the Village of Williamsburgh and what is now called the East Williamsburg In-Place Industrial Park (EWIPIP), bounded by the neighborhoods of Northside and Southside Williamsburg to the west, Greenpoint to the north, Bushwick to the south and southeast, and both Maspeth and Ridgewood in Queens to the east. Much of this area is still referred to as either Bushwick, Williamsburg, or Greenpoint with the term East Williamsburg falling out of use since the 1990s.

== History ==
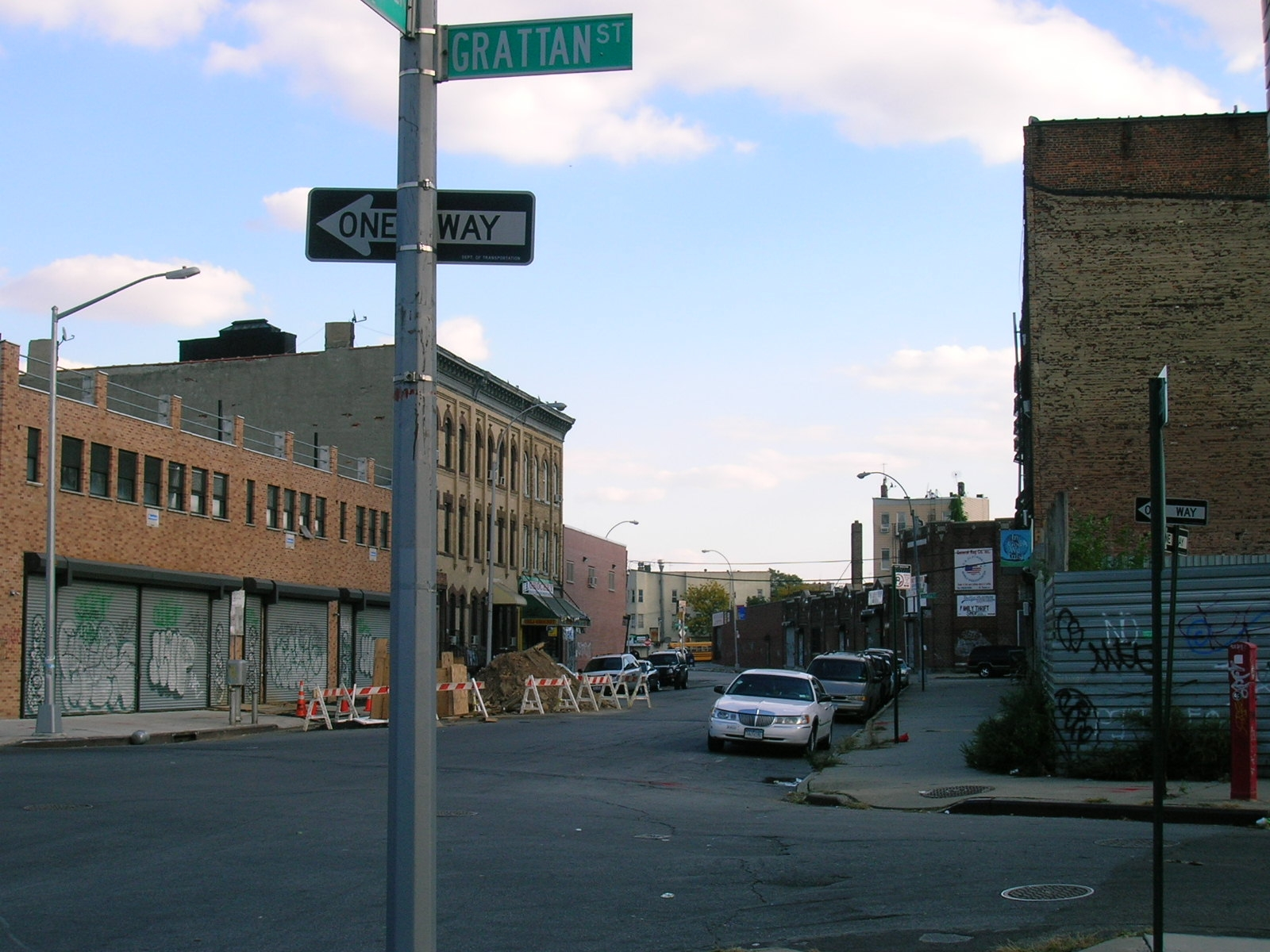
Knickerbocker Avenue looking south at Grattan Street, 2006

In the 18th century, Bushwick was already an established town, and the waterfront area that provided ferry service to the island of Manhattan was simply known as Bushwick Shore. The land of scrub bush that stood between Bushwick Shore and the town of Bushwick was known as Cripplebush. During the Revolutionary War occupation of the area by the British, the land was cleared, with the wood of the thickets being used for fuel. In 1800, Richard M. Woodhull purchased the waterfront property and laid out a settlement, naming it Williamsburgh after his friend and surveyor Colonel Jonathan Williams. Williamsburgh was incorporated as a village in 1827 (as a part of the town of Bushwick), and included 26 streets running East to West and 12 streets east of the shore line running North to South.

On April 18, 1835, the village of Williamsburg was extended eastward to Bushwick Avenue and to Flushing Avenue on the Southeast (then known as Newtown Road). The region that is now circumscribed on the west by Union Ave, on the south by Broadway, then along Flushing Avenue to Bushwick Avenue on the east and on the north (approximately) by the Newtown Creek was designated as the Third District of the Village of Williamsburg in 1835. At this time, the three districts of Williamsburg were more commonly known as the North Side, South Side, and the New Village. The names "North Side" and "South Side" remain in common usage today, but the name for the Third District has changed often. The New Village became populated by Germans and for a time was known by the sobriquet of "Dutchtown". In 1844, Williamsburg separated from the Town of Bushwick and became the Town and Village of Williamsburg. Parts of the Third District were known as "Irish Town" and "The Green" during the latter half of the 19th century.

In 1854, Williamsburg was incorporated into the City of Brooklyn, which was one of the original six Dutch Townships of western Long Island. Upon consolidation with Brooklyn in 1854, Districts one (North Side) and two (South Side) became, respectively, Wards 14 and 13 of the City of Brooklyn. The third District was split and became Wards 15 and 16 of the City of Brooklyn. Ward 15 was the section north of Ten Eyck Street, between Union Avenue and Bushwick Avenue, with the addition of the portion of Ainslie, Grand, Hope, and South Second Streets between west of Union Avenue and east of Rodney Street. Ward 16 was the section south of Ten Eyck Street, bounded by Broadway, Flushing Avenue, and Bushwick Avenue.

== Demographics ==
Based on data from the 2010 United States census, the population of East Williamsburg was 34,158, an increase of 2,280 (7.2%) from the 31,878 counted in 2000. Covering an area of 895.74 acres (362.49 ha), the neighborhood had a population density of 38.1 inhabitants per acre (24,400/sq mi; 9,400/km^{2}).

The racial makeup of the neighborhood was 43.1% (14,706) White, 9.3% (3,189) African American, 0.1% (40) Native American, 12.7% (4,354) Asian, 0.1% (21) Pacific Islander, 0.3% (115) from other races, and 1.6% (561) from two or more races. Hispanic or Latino of any race were 32.7% (11,172) of the population.

As according to the 2020 census data from New York City Department of City Planning, there were between 20,000 and 29,999 White residents and 10,000 to 19,999 Hispanic residents; however, Black and Asian residents were each between 5,000 and 9,999 residents.

== Transportation ==
East Williamsburg is well served by the New York City Subway. It is mainly served by the Grand Street, Montrose Avenue, and Morgan Avenue stops of the BMT Canarsie Line (L train). On the border with Bedford-Stuyvesant is the Flushing Avenue stop of the BMT Jamaica Line (J and M trains) and the Flushing Avenue stop of the IND Crosstown Line (G train).

East Williamsburg is also served by the B24 bus on Kingsland and Meeker Avenues, the B57 on Flushing Avenue, the B60 on Montrose, Johnson and Morgan Avenues, the Q54 on Metropolitan Avenue and Grand Street, and the Q59 on Grand Street.

The Kosciuszko Bridge (carrying Interstate 278) and the Grand Street Bridge across the Newtown Creek connect East Williamsburg with Maspeth, Queens.

== Boundaries ==
East Williamsburg is in Brooklyn Community Board 1 and is bounded by the East River, Kent Avenue, Flushing Avenue, and the Newtown Creek.

However, various parts of the East Williamsburg are served by different post offices. The neighborhood includes the zip codes 11211, served by the Williamsburg Post Office at 263 S. 4th Street; 11206, served by the Metropolitan-Bushwick Post Office at 47 Debevoise Street; 11222, served by the Greenpoint Post Office at 66 Meserole Avenue; and 11237, served by the Wyckoff Heights-Bushwick Post Office at 86 Wyckoff Avenue.

There are several public housing projects in East Williamsburg, including the Williamsburg Houses, Borinquen Plaza Houses, Cooper Park Houses, John Francis Hylan Houses, and the Bushwick Houses.

Greenspaces include Cooper Park.

== Subsections ==
=== East Williamsburg Industrial Park ===
The eastern half of East Williamsburg, roughly bounded by the Newtown Creek on the east and by I-278 and Flushing Avenue on the north and south, respectively, is mostly zoned for industry with some residential housing mixed among the warehouses and factories. The section is currently referred to by the city as the East Williamsburg Industrial Park (EWIP), or formally the East Williamsburg In-Place Industrial Park (EWIPIP). The western boundary runs approximately along Kinsgland Ave, then Morgan Avenue and then just east of Bushwick Avenue.

The EWIP is one of eight In-Place Industrial Parks in New York City and is managed by the East Williamsburg Valley Industrial Development Corporation (EWVIDCO), a company founded in 1982 with the goal of revitalizing East Williamsburg by attracting new businesses, providing business assistance to existing firms and grow overall job opportunities in the neighborhood.

Historically, this neighborhood was not part of the Village of Williamsburgh. In the late 19th century the region east of the present-day Humboldt Street, west of the Newtown Creek, south of Meeker Avenue, and north of Metropolitan Avenue was the 18th ward of the City of Brooklyn. The north part of the EWIP is served by the Greenpoint Post Office and is considered by some to be part of Greenpoint. The portion of the EWIP to the south of Metropolitan Avenue was historically part of Bushwick and is still referred by many as being in Bushwick.

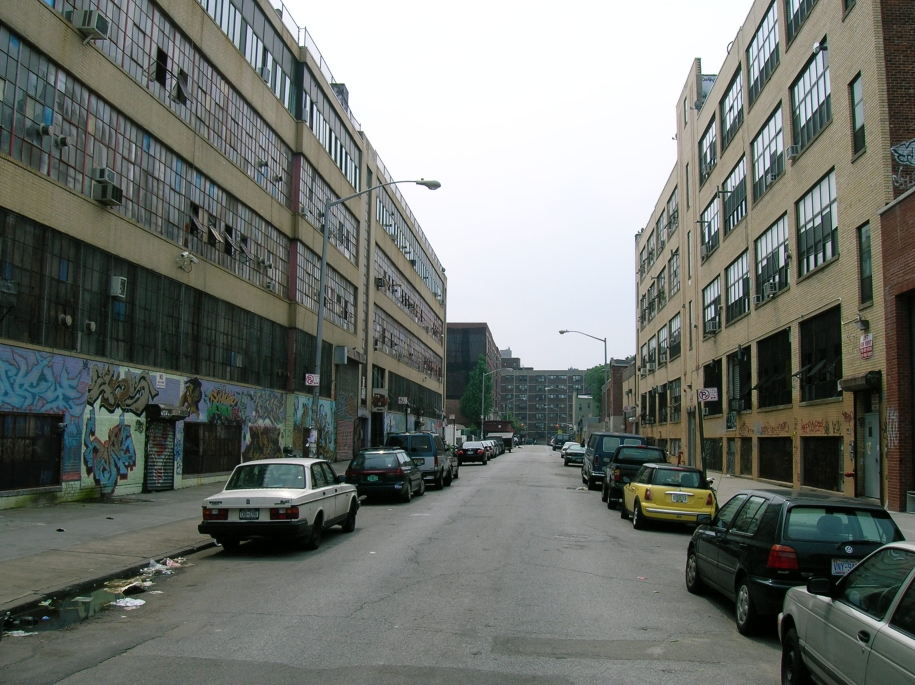
The McKibbin Lofts, with low rise projects in the distance, 2006

For many years a well-known landmark in East Williamsburg was a pair of cylindrical natural gas holders located on Maspeth Avenue, built in 1927 and 1948 by Brooklyn Union Gas, and demolished in 2001.

=== East of Bushwick Avenue ===
The section of Brooklyn that lies east of Bushwick Avenue, bordered by Metropolitan Avenue and Flushing Avenue on the North and South, is referred to some as being part of East Williamsburg since the region is part of EWIP. Factories and warehouses are being decommissioned due to heavy and light industry leaving the area. An example of this can be seen in the adjacent picture which shows the two loft buildings on McKibbin St., 255 McKibbin and 248 McKibbin. At present it lies within the boundaries of Community Board 1, the Brooklyn Community Board for Greenpoint and Williamsburg.

== Library ==
The Brooklyn Public Library (BPL)'s Bushwick branch is located at 340 Bushwick Avenue near Seigel Street. The Bushwick branch was founded in 1903 and its current building opened in 1908.

== Culture ==
There are several communities and neighborhoods within East Williamsburg. Since the late 19th century, most of the immigrants to this section have come from Italy or from Puerto Rico and other Latin American countries. Graham Avenue (also known as Avenue of Puerto Rico to the south of Grand Street, and Via Vespucci to the north), Grand Street, and Metropolitan Avenue are the main shopping districts. The Moore Street Market, often referred to as La Marqueta de Williamsburg, is located at 110 Moore Street.

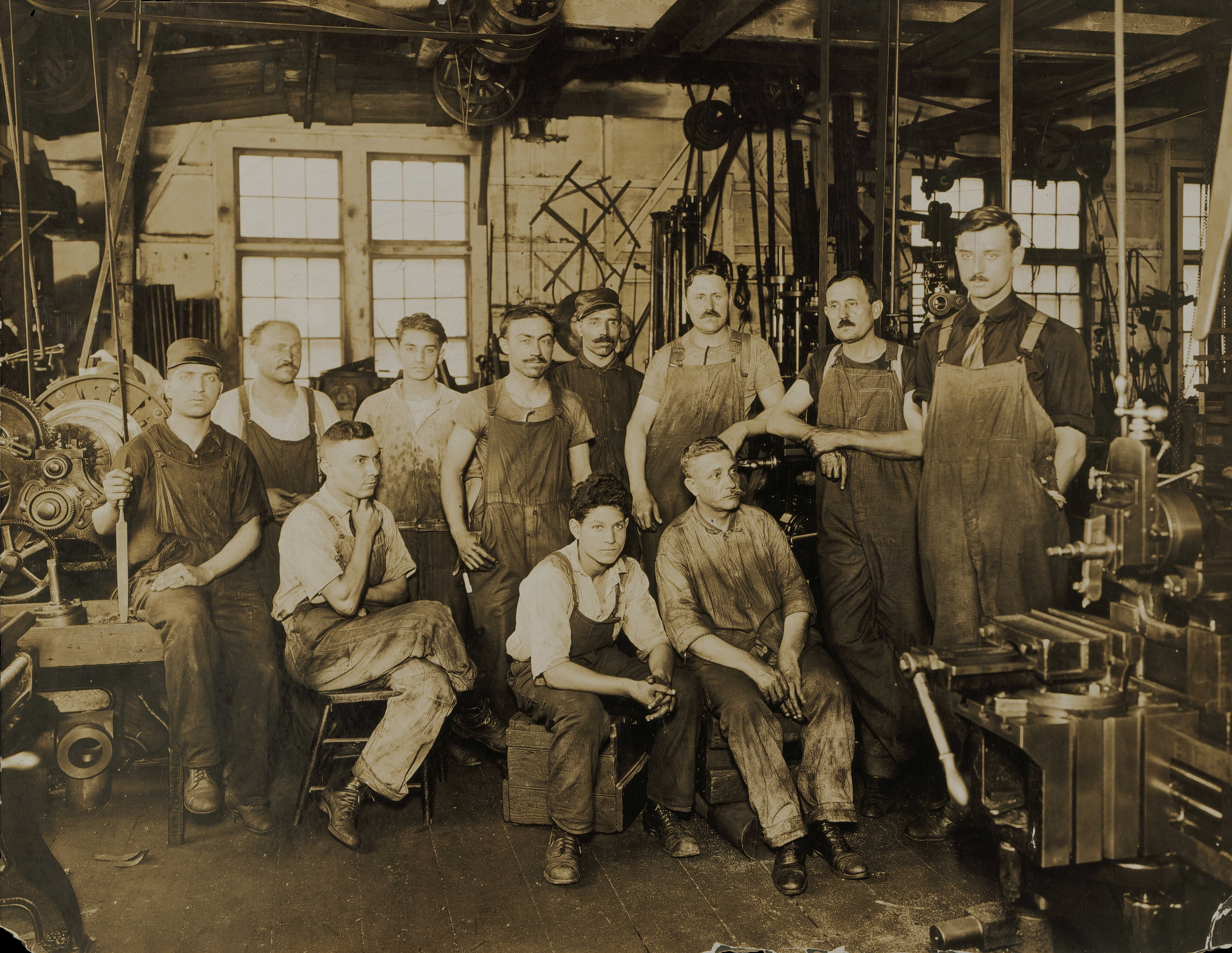
I. DeFrancisci & Son, 219 Morgan Avenue, Brooklyn, 1917

The first wave of Italian immigration to East Williamsburg occurred in the second half of the 19th century. By the late 1880s, the neighborhood along Graham Avenue was inhabited by many Italian immigrants, as evidenced by The Our Lady of the Snow Society at 410 Graham Avenue, established in 1888. Italians also attended St. Cecilia's Catholic Church at 84 Herbert Street, which was established in 1871 and run mainly by Irish. Other Italian societies in the neighborhood include Sabino Society on Withers St., the San Cono Society on Ainslie St. A second wave of Italian immigration occurred from World War II until the 1970s. While the neighborhood has changed significantly, the established Italian community still thrives along the north end of Graham avenue, also referred to as "Via Vespucci". The neighborhood also was home to The Motion Lounge, the former nightclub at 420 Graham Avenue owned by Bonanno crime family caporegime Dominick Napolitano.

There are also many Puerto Rican residents. The south end of Graham Avenue (also known as "Avenue of Puerto Rico") has been the center of a Latin American immigrant neighborhood since the 1950s.

Since the 1990s, the area has seen a great influx of young artists, professionals, students and "hipsters", mainly due to its close proximity to Manhattan and major universities (e.g. Pratt Institute, New York University, School of Visual Arts, Fashion Institute of Technology, The New School) and the relatively inexpensive rent. The rent is rising however, and the influx of said students has made housing more competitive pushing out those who cannot afford the rising cost of living in the north.
