= Cooper Park =

Public park in Brooklyn, New York

Coordinates: 40°42′57″N 73°56′15″W

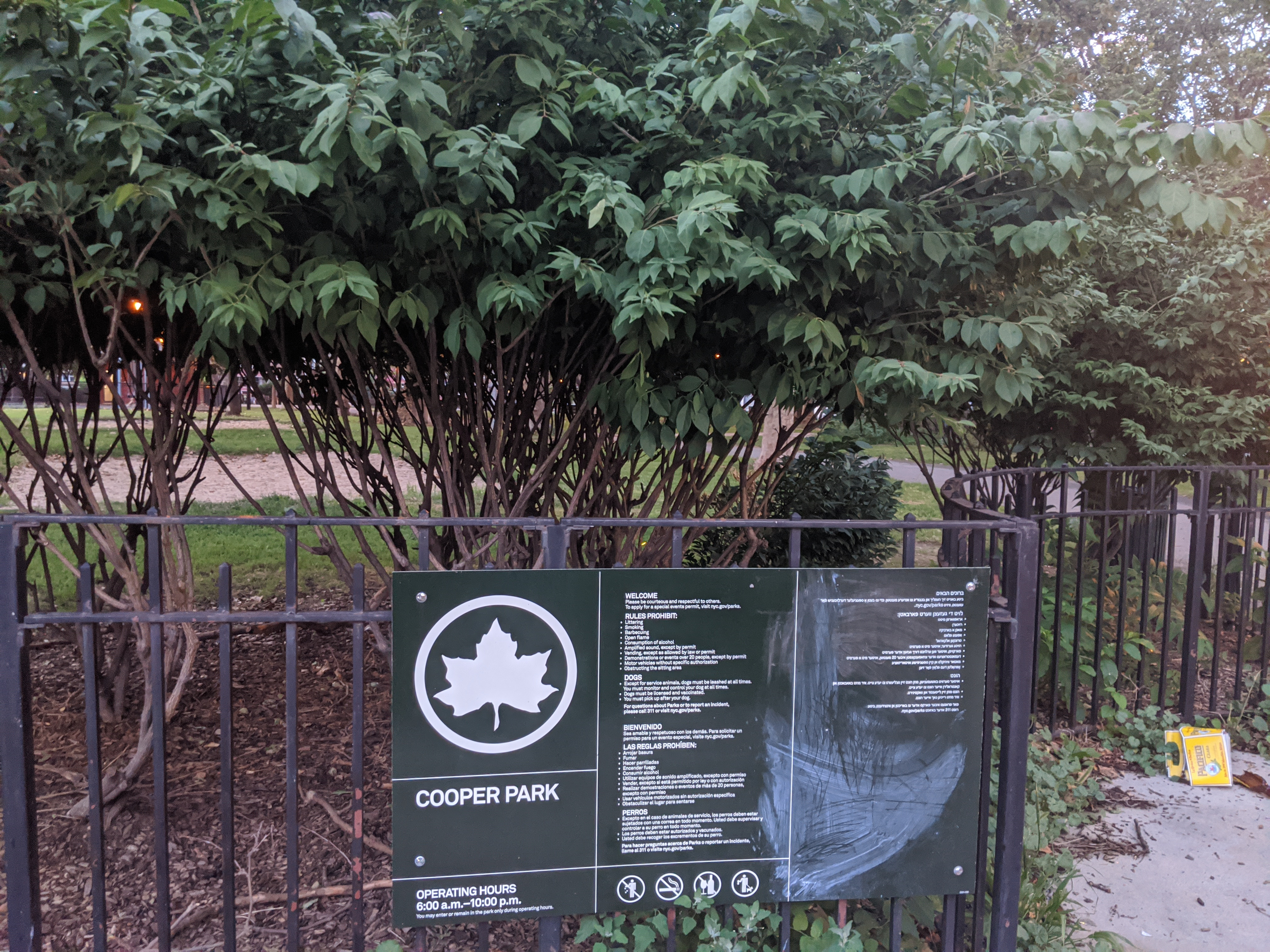
Southeastern gate of Cooper Park

Cooper Park is an urban park in Brooklyn, New York City, between Maspeth Avenue, Sharon Street, Olive Street, and Morgan Avenue in East Williamsburg. It was established in 1895 and covers 6.40 acres (2.59 ha).

Cooper Park was once the site of an old glue factory owned by American industrialist Peter Cooper. He started his glue business in Kips Bay, in 1821. In 1838, he moved his business from Kips Bay to Maspeth Avenue in Brooklyn. Cooper retired from the glue business in 1838 and sold the factory to his family members. In 1878, the business left Maspeth Avenue, and eventually left Brooklyn for good in the 20th century. In 1895, Cooper's family sold the site of the Maspeth Avenue factory to The City of Brooklyn for $55,000. From there, the site was cleared and became Cooper Park.

The main attractions of the park include a dog run and the Carnegie Playground. There is also a variety of sports facilities including two basketball courts, four handball courts, two tennis courts, two volleyball courts, a pollinator garden, and a skate park. A public bathroom and spray shower are present as well.

== History ==
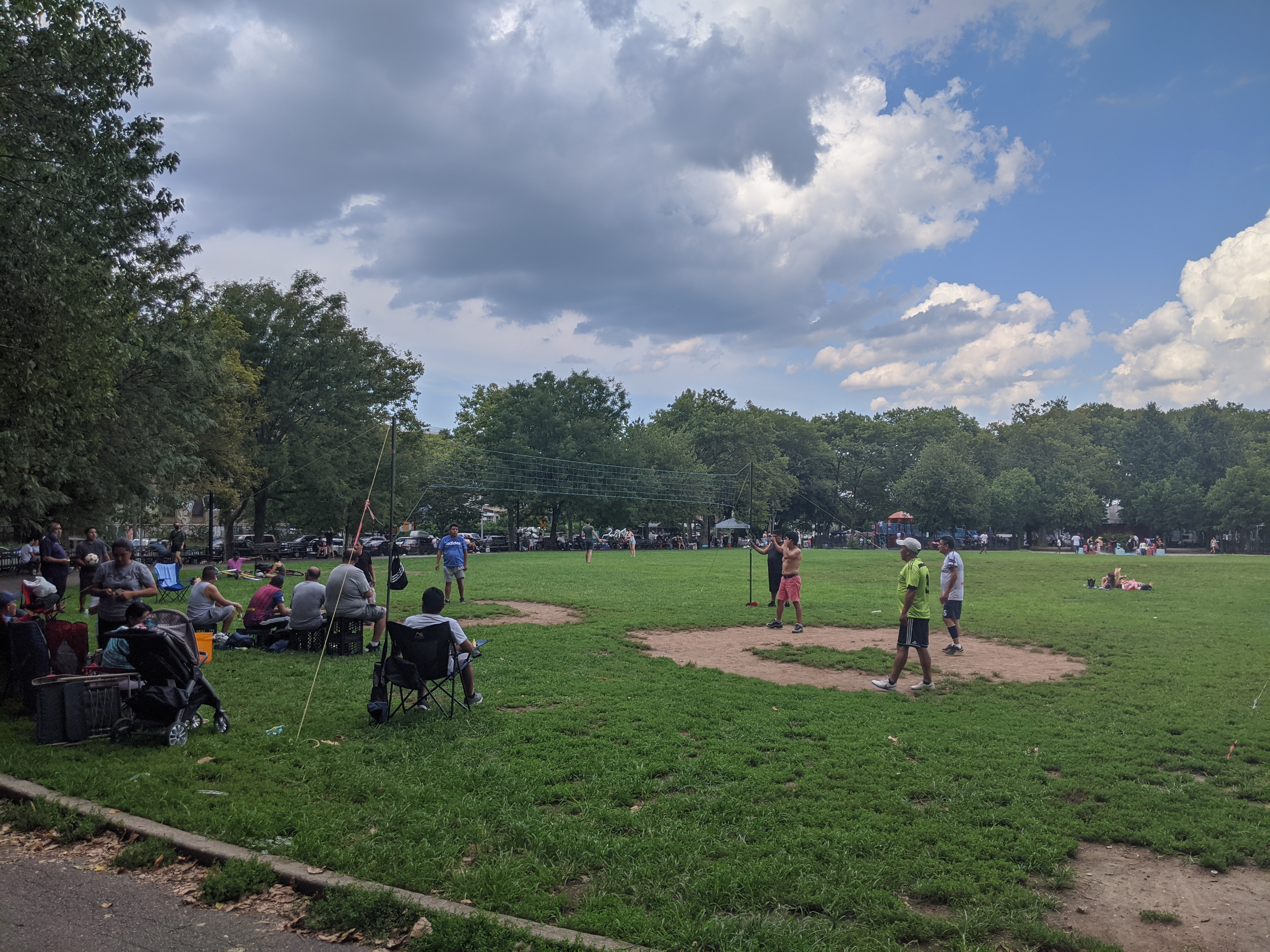
Southern side of Cooper Park

In 1898, Cooper Park showed evidence of a lack of nourishing soil. That year, a contract was entered to supply the park with one thousand cubic yards of soil. Additionally, the pathways of the park were re-paved with asphalt tiles, replacing the former walkways that were composed of cinder and gravel.

In 1906, the City of New York started construction on a shelter house at Cooper Park. It contracted L. E. Brown for the work and materials required for its construction. It also contracted Dodge & Morrison for architectural services.

In 1920, Cooper park underwent a series of renovations including repaired plumbing, repaired electrical work and repaired irrigation systems. In that year, the appraised property value of the park was $140,000.

In November 2017, a group of Brooklyn citizens formed a new group called the Friends of Cooper Park. The group collaborates on ideas to keep the park clean and maintain its landscaping.

== Geography ==
Cooper Park covers 6.4 acres (2.6 ha) in Northern Brooklyn. To the north of the park is the neighborhood of Greenpoint, to the east of the park is Newtown Creek and to the west of the park is the neighborhood of Williamsburg. Next to the park, there is an affordable housing complex owned by the New York Housing Authority named Cooper Park Houses, and there is a homeless shelter named The Barbara Kleinmen residence.

== Facilities ==
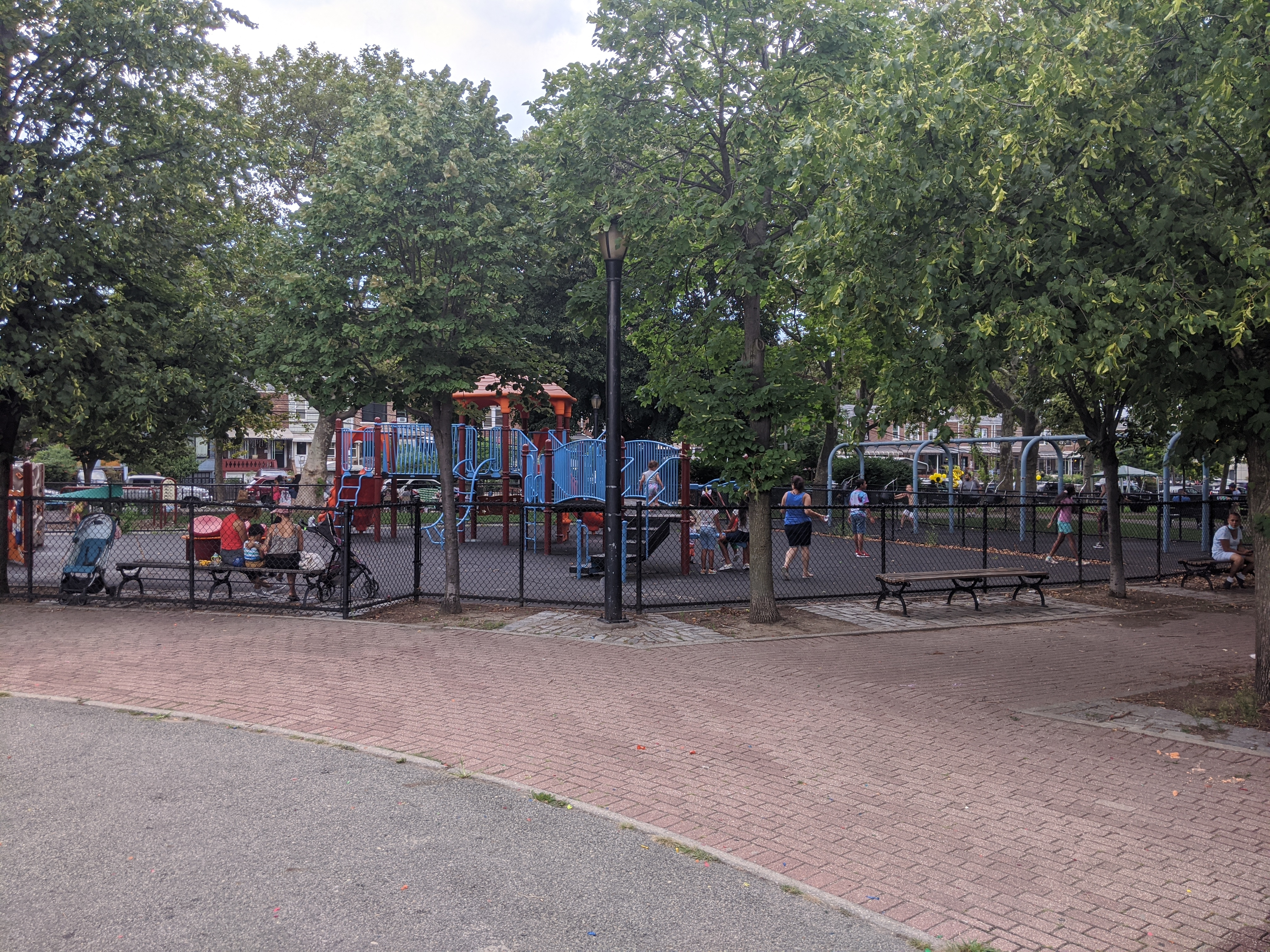
Playground at Cooper Park

=== Basketball ===
The basketball courts require a permit for use. Those who are under 18 may obtain a permit for free, but those who are over 18 are required to purchase one. Organized leagues and special events must purchase a permit as well.

=== Tennis ===
The tennis courts requires a permit for use. Adults under the age of 61 must purchase a seasonal permit for $100. Seniors and minors are eligible for discounts. Permits and reservations can be done online.

=== Dog run ===
The dog run is in the SW corner by Sharon Street and Morgan Ave.

=== Playground ===
The playground in Cooper Park is named Carnegie Playground. It was named after Margaret Carnegie. It has been reported to have acceptable conditions, the majority of the time, throughout the past decade by the Parks Inspection Program (PIP).

== Management ==
Cooper Park is managed by the New York City Department of Parks and Recreation.
