= Land to Sea =

Coffee shop in East Williamsburg

- Interactive map of Land to Sea

General information
- Location: 402 Graham Avenue, Brooklyn, New York, United States
- Coordinates: 40.71685°N 73.9446°W
- Opened: October 9, 2021

Land to Sea is a woman-owned, Hong Kong–inspired coffee shop and community space in East Williamsburg, Brooklyn. In addition to selling Asian beverages and baked goods, it also hosts events, such as a Lunar New Year flea market and weekly concert series, and exhibitions from local artists.

== History ==
Land to Sea was opened on October 9, 2021 by Emily Shum and Eva Zhou, two former fashion students who met at Fashion Institute of Technology and decided to start a business together after briefly working for clothing brands. They imagined it while dining at Win Son Bakery and specifically envisioned a space that would pay "homage to the types of marketplaces in China their families would frequent." Prior to its opening, Shum and Zhou had pitched the idea for Land to Sea on Kickstarter and raised 100% of its goal in a month's time, totaling $35,510 from 179 backers.

In 2022, Land to Sea began roasting their own coffee with fellow Brooklyn company Shared Roasting. In 2023, they began a wine program to complement their late-night events.

In 2024, Land to Sea hosted an art exhibit in featuring 20 Asian American artists. It ran from August to September.
