= Bushwick-Hylan Houses =

Public housing development at Brooklyn, New York

- NYCHA Property
- Bushwick Houses and Hylan Houses
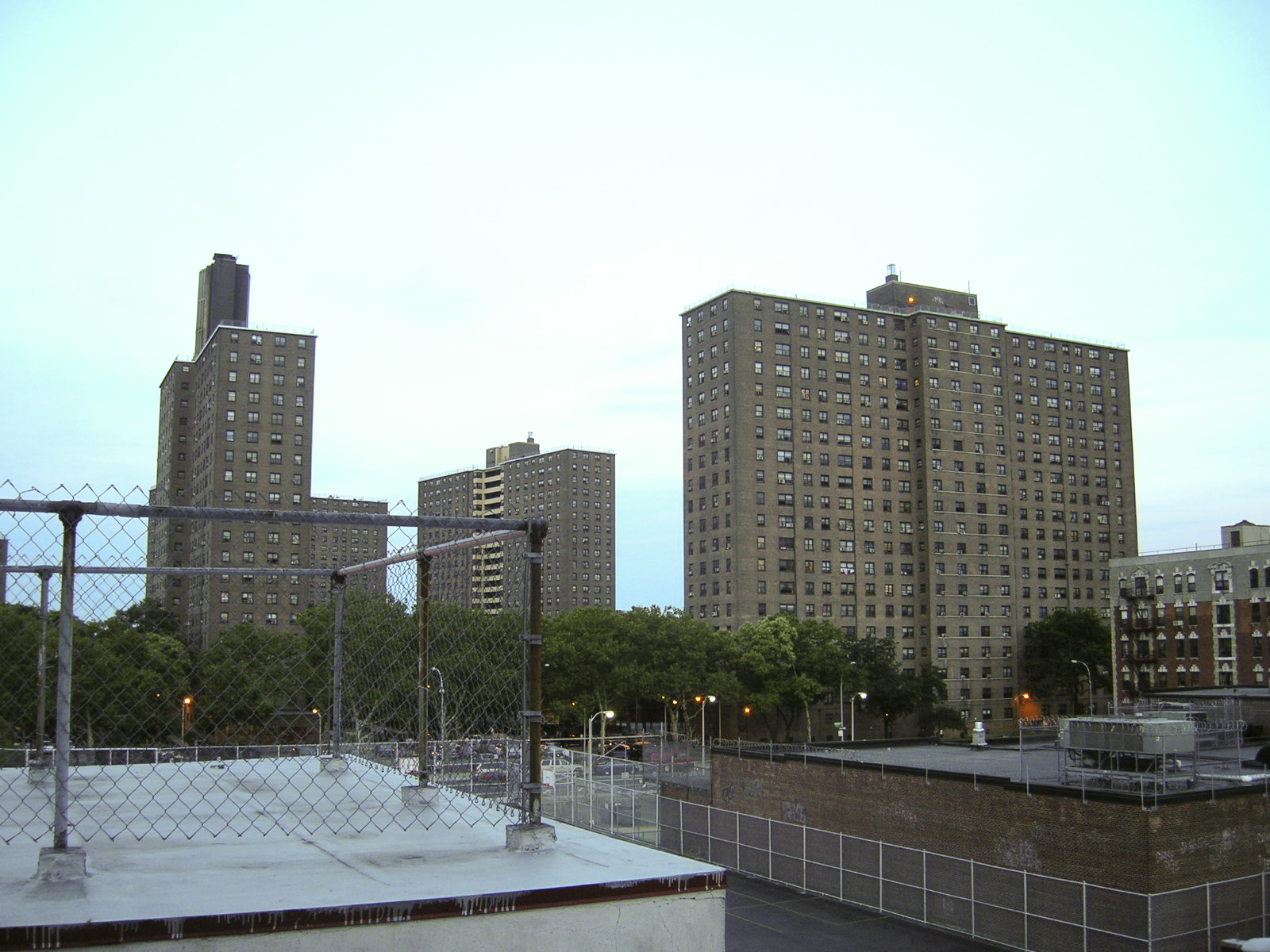
- Interactive map of Bushwick-Hylan Houses
- Country: United States
- State: New York
- City: New York City
- Borough: Brooklyn

Area (Note: Bushwick and Hylan Houses Acres combined (14.65 + 1.7))
  - Total: 16.35 acres (6.62 ha)

Population (Note: Bushwick and Hylan Houses Total Population added (2468 + 405))
  - Total: 2,873
- Zip Code: 11206

The Bushwick-Hylan Houses are 2 different but connected NYCHA housing projects with 8 buildings in the Bushwick side and another building on the Hylan side. Buildings I-IV have 20 stories while the rest (V-VIII) have 13 stories in the Bushwick Houses section and the Hylan Houses building has 19 stories. It is located between Moore Street and Flushing Avenue and also between Humboldt Street and Bushwick Avenue on the Bushwick Side and the Hylan Houses Buildings is located between Seigel and Moore Streets and also between Humboldt Street and Bushwick Avenue as well. Both of these developments are in Williamsburg, Brooklyn.

== History ==
The Bushwick Houses were built first on April 1, 1960 while the Hylan Houses were built later on June 30 at that same year. The Hylan Houses were named after Mayor John Francis Hylan, who grew up in the Bushwick neighborhood.

=== 21st Century ===
Hylan Houses is under plans to be converted into the Preservation Trust Section 8 Management upon enough votes from the residents back in April 2025.

== See also ==
- New York City Housing Authority
