= Borinquen Plaza =

Public housing development in Brooklyn, New York

- NYCHA Property
- Borinquen Plaza I & II
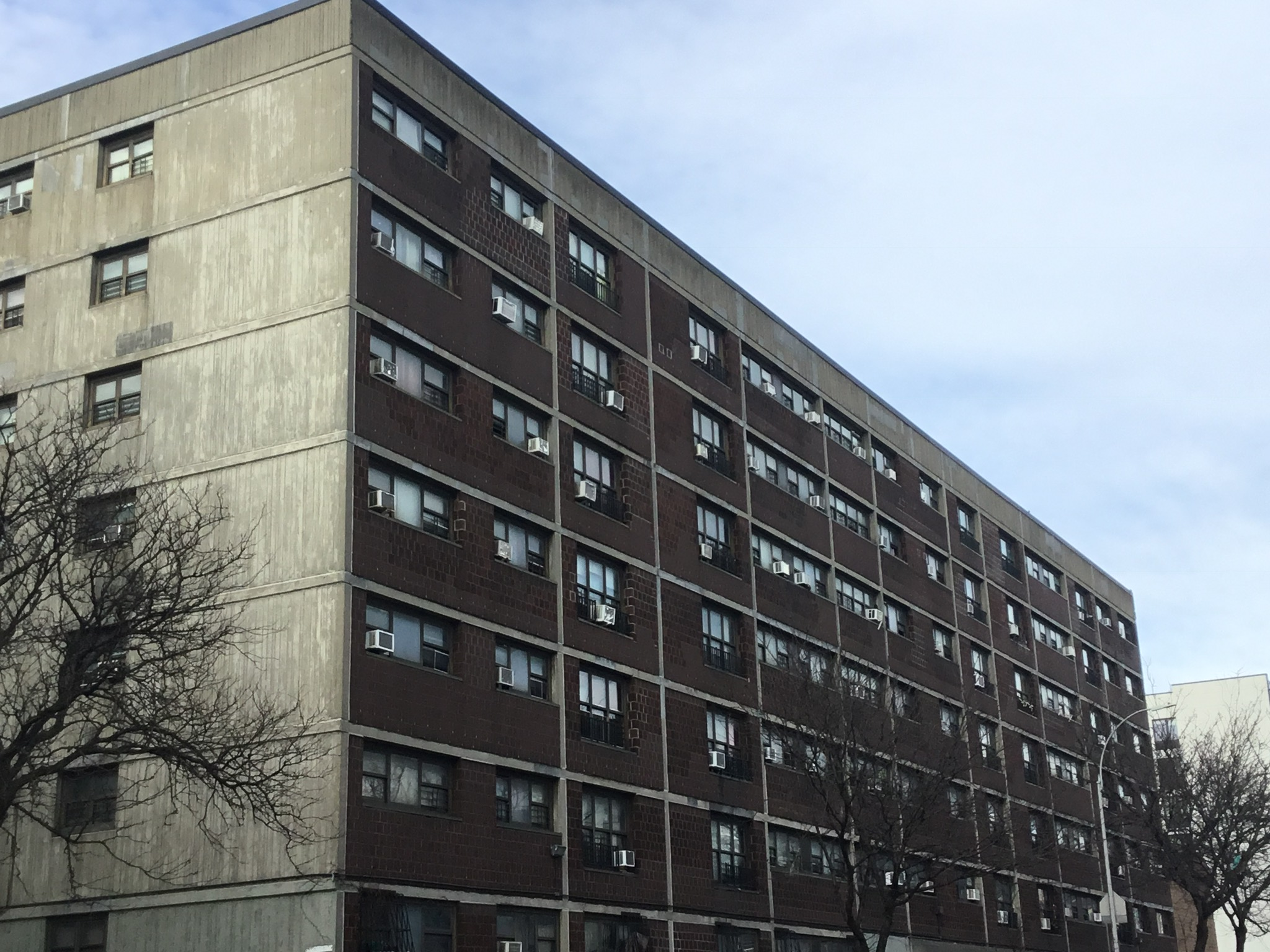
- One of the Borinquen Plaza II Buildings
- Interactive map of Borinquen Plaza
- Country: United States
- State: New York
- City: New York City
- Borough: Brooklyn

Area (Note: Sections I and II acres added together (6 + 4.28))
  - Total: 10.28 acres (4.16 ha)

Population (Note: Sections I and II population added together (1016 + 971))
  - Total: 1,987
- Zip Code: 11206

The Borinquen Plaza is a NYCHA housing project with 2 sections and all buildings in both sections are 7 stories tall. The 1st section has 8 buildings while the 2nd has only 7 buildings.

The 1st section is located on 2 different segments: The 1st segment between Manhattan and Graham Avenues and also between Seigel to Varet Streets and the 2nd segment between Graham and Humboldt Streets and also between Boerum to Seigel Streets.

The 2nd section is located on a block between Humboldt Street and Bushwick Avenue and also between Boerum and Seigel Streets.

These two housing project sections are both located in Williamsburg, Brooklyn.

== History ==
Originally called the Lindsay-Bushwick Urban Renewal Project, the housing complex was renamed after Borinquen, the Indian name for Puerto Rico, to honor the large population of Puerto Ricans in the surrounding neighborhood. A dedication ceremony was held on September 4, 1973, and attended by Mayor John Lindsay. The first section of the housing complex was completed in February 1975 while the second section was later completed in December 1975.

=== 21st century ===
By 2025, residents experienced frequent elevator malfunctions. Major repairs of I and II were expected to be funded by a capital program costing $80 billion.

== See also ==
- New York City Housing Authority
