= Flushing Avenue =

Avenue in Brooklyn and Queens, New York

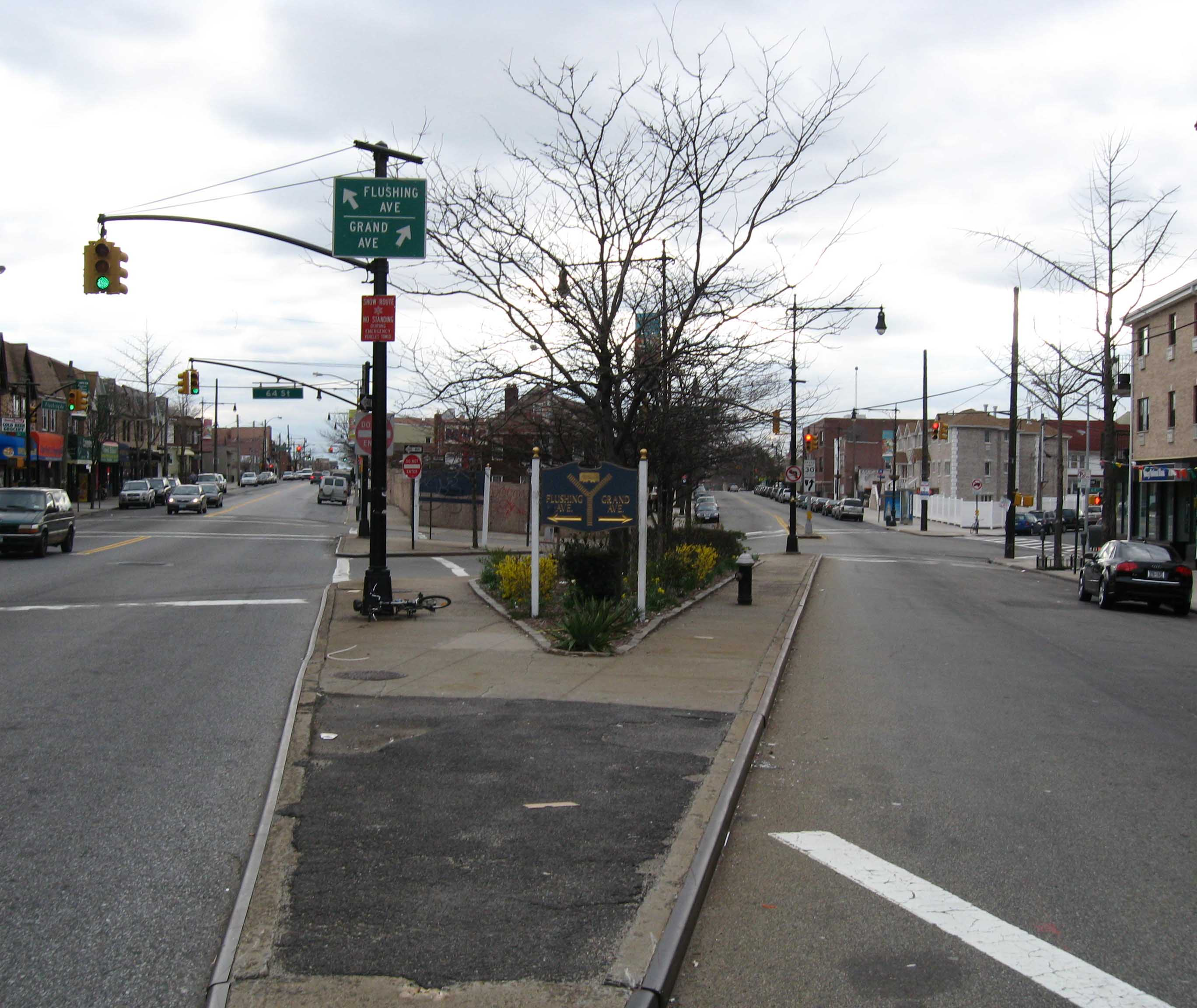
- Flushing Avenue in Maspeth
- Interactive map of Flushing Avenue
- Namesake: Vlissingen
- Owner: City of New York
- Maintained by: NYCDOT
- Length: 4.8 mi (7.7 km)
- Location: Brooklyn, Queens
- Postal code: 11201, 11205, 11211, 11206, 11237, 11385, 11378
- Nearest metro station: Flushing Avenue; Flushing Avenue; Jefferson Street
- West end: Nassau Street / Navy Street in Fort Greene
- Major junctions: I-278 in Clinton Hill
- East end: Grand Avenue (Queens) in Maspeth

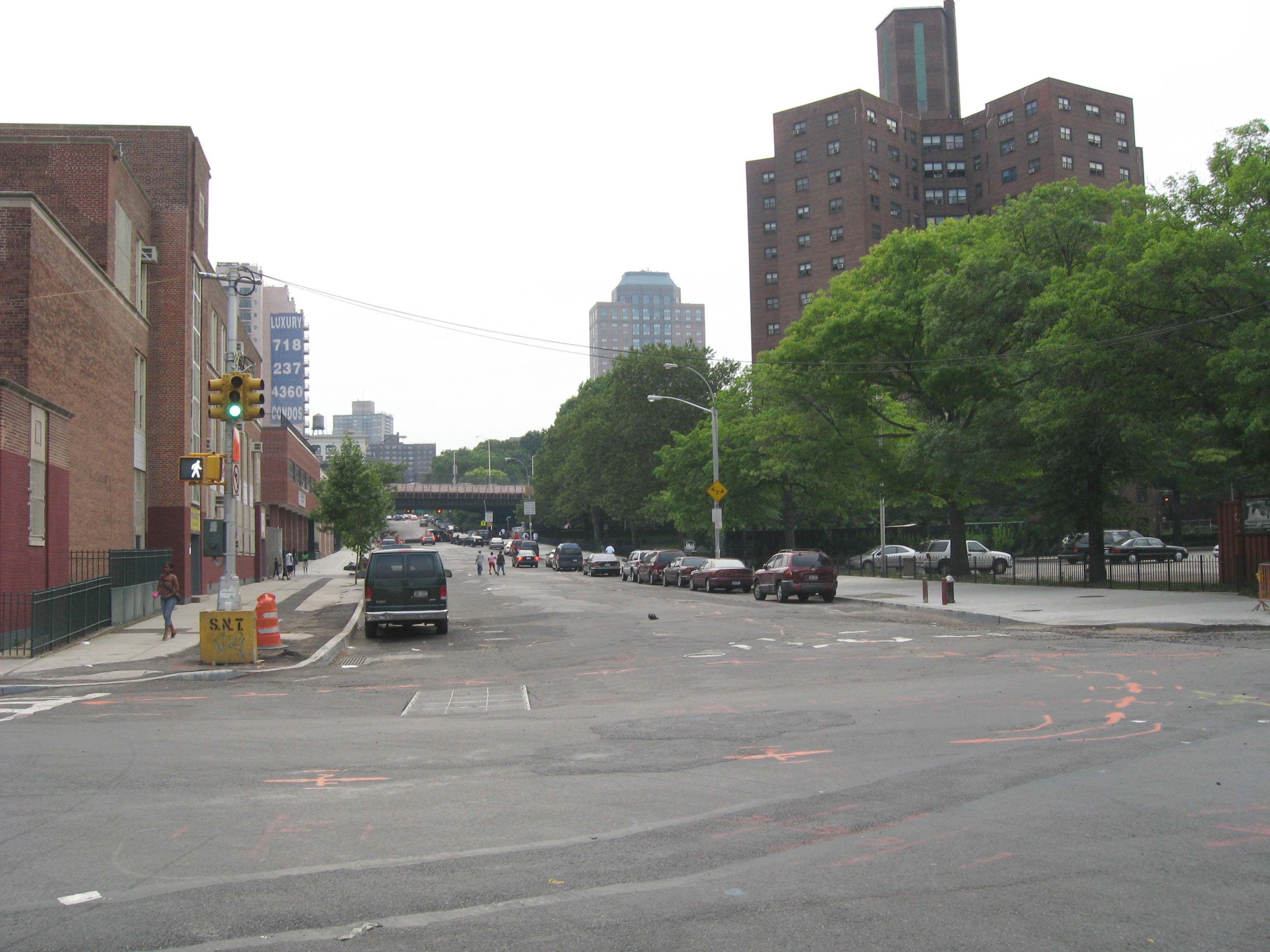
Western Flushing Avenue

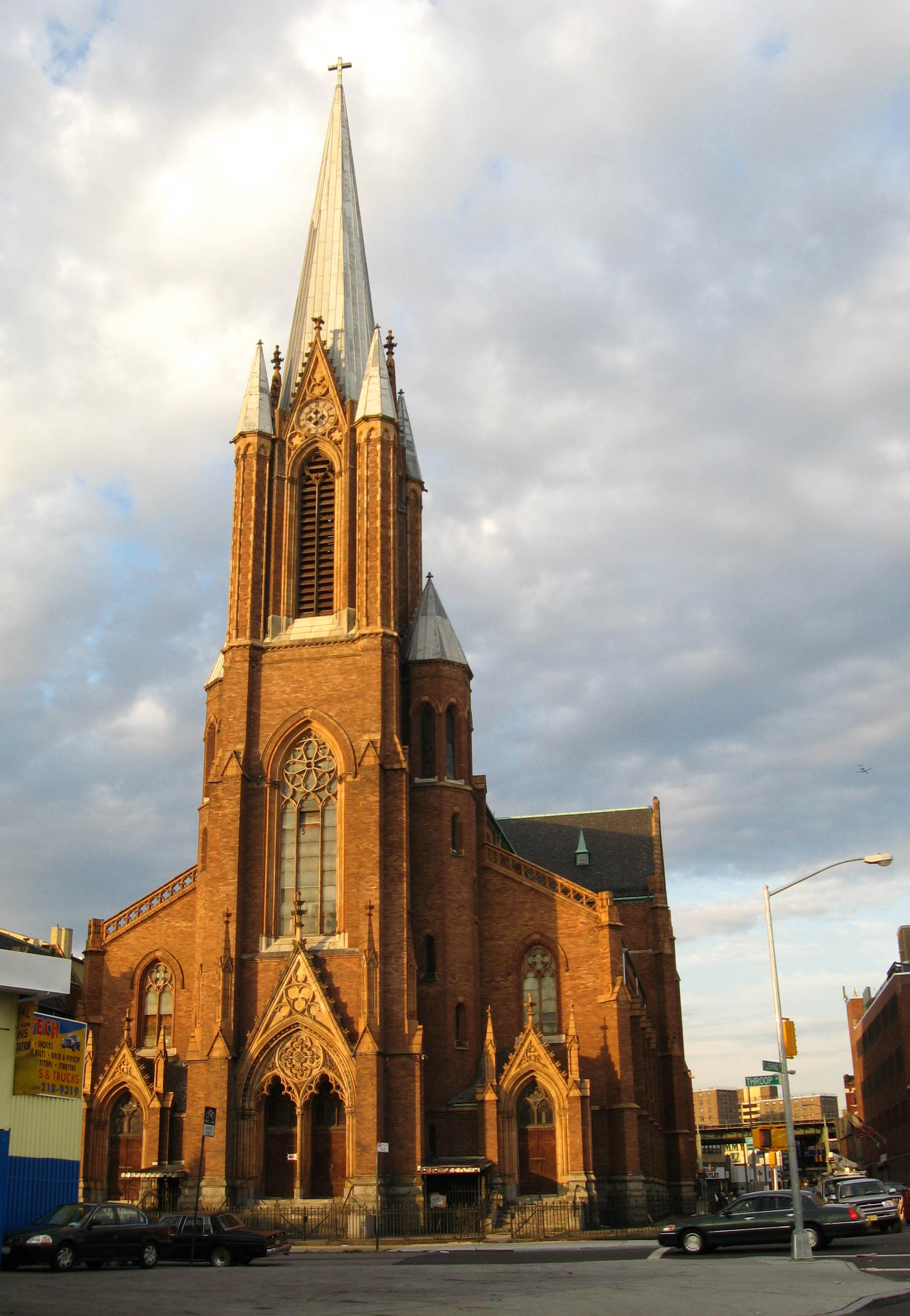
All Saints Catholic Church at Flushing and Throop Avenues

Flushing Avenue is a street running through northern Brooklyn and western Queens, beginning at Nassau Street in Fort Greene, Brooklyn, and ending at Grand Avenue in Maspeth. It divides the neighborhood of Williamsburg from Clinton Hill and East Williamsburg from Bushwick. After crossing the Queens border, the avenue serves as the dividing line between Ridgewood, Queens and West Maspeth. Flushing Avenue then terminates in Maspeth. Despite its name, however, the avenue does not extend to Flushing.

== Route description ==
The avenue is primarily an industrial thoroughfare. On its extreme western end, it serves the Brooklyn Navy Yard, a former naval shipyard turned industrial park. Part of the Brooklyn Waterfront Greenway bike path runs alongside Flushing Avenue in this area. In this district, the south side of Flushing Avenue contains many abandoned business that were supported by sailors and ship workers before the government closed the yard.

Continuing eastward, Flushing Avenue crosses the Brooklyn-Queens Expressway. This section of Flushing Avenue, between the expressway and Broadway, has seen considerable redevelopment over recent years by Williamsburg's Hasidic population, as young urban professionals have moved into the northern end of Williamsburg. The north side of Flushing Avenue in this section is a primarily residential area, whereas the south side is primarily industrial, the most notable exception being the Marcy Houses housing project. The Flushing Avenue subway station is at Flushing and Marcy Avenues.

Flushing Avenue forms the south side of the so-called "Broadway Triangle", bounded on the northeast by Broadway and on the west by Union Avenue, whose factories were largely abandoned shortly after the turn of the 21st century. The Triangle was rezoned as "residential" in December 2009.

The commercial heart of Flushing Avenue is the intersection with Broadway and Graham Avenue, in the extreme southern end of Williamsburg. This business improvement district is serviced by the J and M trains' Flushing Avenue stop. In this area are cheap retail shopping, food shops and fast-food chains. This primarily Puerto Rican and Hasidic area is becoming increasingly populated with students and young professionals.

Near the intersection with Bushwick Avenue, residential Bushwick borders Flushing Avenue to the south, and the massive Bushwick Houses to the north. At Morgan and at Wyckoff Avenue, a community of artists and young professionals have moved into the low-rise lofts that were once abandoned. An effect of this gentrification was the opening of two bar-restaurants, Life Cafe and the Wreck Room, on an adjacent section of Flushing Avenue.

Continuing past Wyckoff Avenue, the avenue crosses into Queens, passes the historic Vander Ende-Onderdonk House Site (formerly in Brooklyn, now Queens), and becomes actively industrial on both sides. Upon entering Maspeth, it is a residential street.

== History ==
In 1951, eighteen traffic signals at the western end of Flushing Avenue, as well as along Park Avenue in Fort Greene, were re-timed to increase the flow of traffic heading west to the Manhattan Bridge.

Flushing Avenue has seen considerable decline since its heyday in the early and mid-20th century. Some sections began to gentrify, to varying degrees, at the turn of the 21st century. In 2004, the city began a project to upgrade the water and sewer infrastructure on the western part of the road, and to repave it; the project was completed in 2008.

== Transportation ==
Flushing Avenue is served by the following bus routes:

- The B57 serves the entire length of the avenue, except between 61st Street and Grand Avenue. Westbound buses run out of service from 64th Street to 61st Street before changing its destination from Maspeth to Red Hook.
- The B69 runs on the avenue between its western end and Vanderbilt Avenue.
- From Throop Avenue, southbound B43 buses head west to Tompkins Avenue, while northbound buses head east to Broadway.
- The Q58 and Q98 run between the avenue’s eastern end and Fresh Pond Road.
- All northbound B44 buses that terminate at Flushing Avenue run east on it from Bedford Avenue to Nostrand Avenue, changing its destination to Sheepshead Bay.

The following subway stations are located at or near the corridor:

- The New York City Subway’s IND Crosstown Line has a station on Union Avenue served by the G train.
- The BMT Jamaica Line has a station on Broadway served by the J and M trains.
- The BMT Canarsie Line has a nearby stop at the Jefferson Street station served by the L train.
