= Cooper Park Houses =

Public housing in Brooklyn, New York

- NYCHA Property
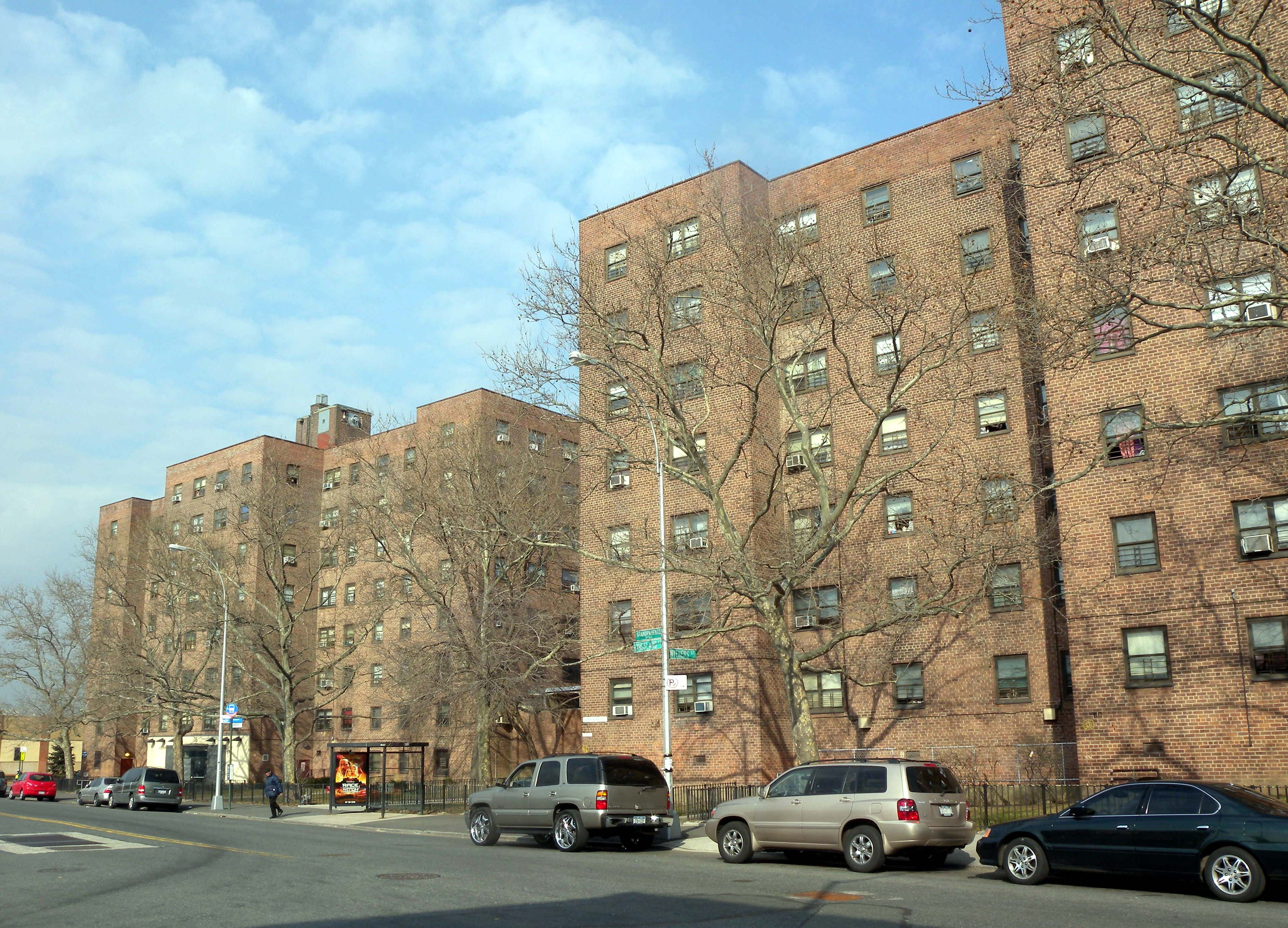
- Interactive map of Cooper Park Houses
- Country: United States
- State: New York
- City: New York City
- Borough: Brooklyn

Area
  - Total: 12.38 acres (5.01 ha)

Population
  - Total: 1,448
- Zip Codes: 11211 and 11222

The Cooper Park Houses is a Public Housing Complex owned by NYCHA and it has eleven 7-story buildings. It is located between Kingsland and Morgan Avenues and between Frost Street and Maspeth Avenue in East Williamsburg, Brooklyn. It has 1,448 residents as of 2025 and is named after the adjacent Cooper Park.

The project was approved by the City Planning Commission in 1951. Construction began on June 29, 1951 and the cornerstone was laid on October 21, 1952. Tenants began moving into the complex in March 1953; this housing complex was completed in June 1953.

In 2017, NYCHA unveiled a "NextGen" 10-year strategic plan to repair and rebuild public housing to improve the conditions of each building.

== See also ==
- New York City Housing Authority
