= The Our Lady of the Snow Society =

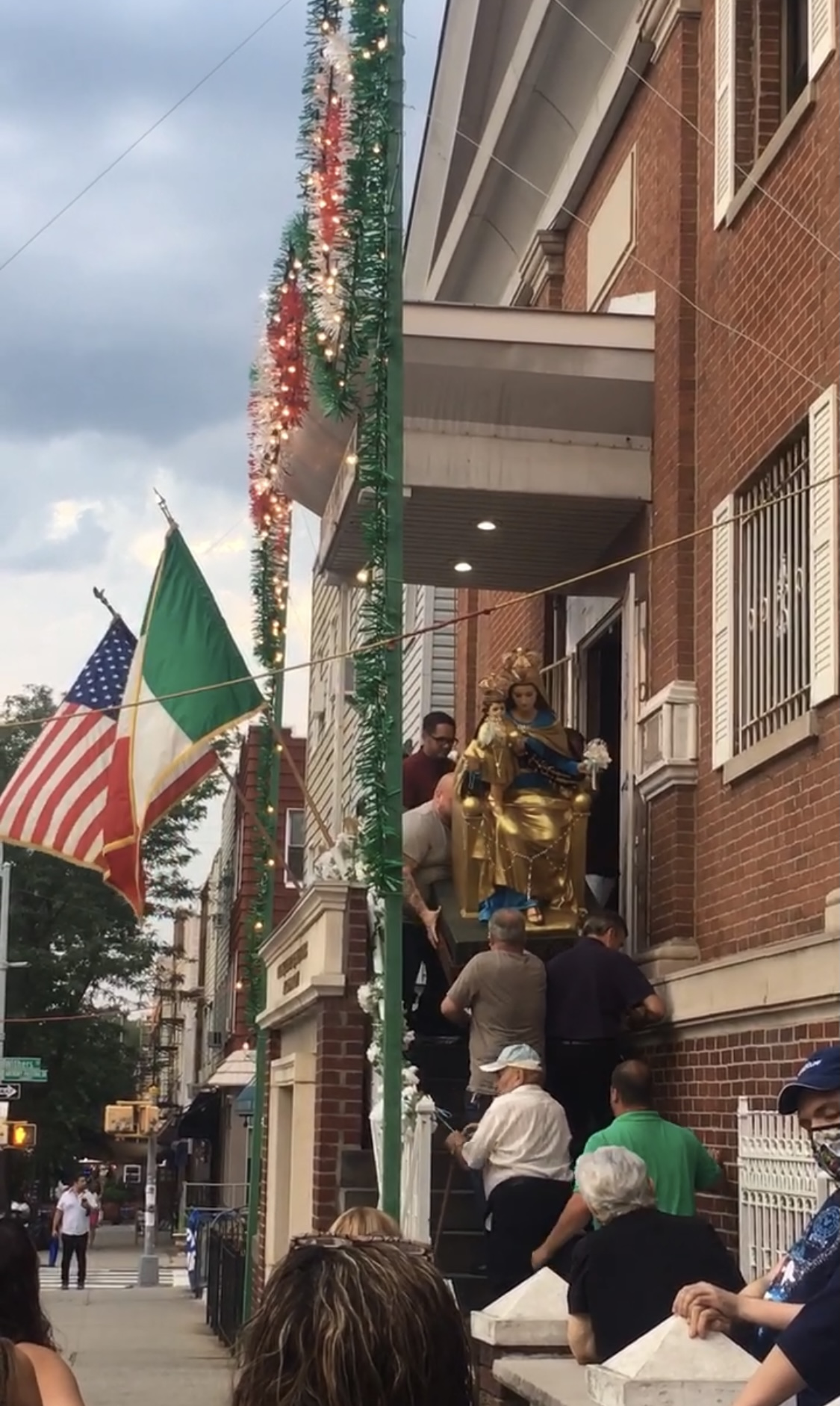
The Feast of Our Lady of the Snow in Williamsburg, Brooklyn on July 27, 2021.

The Our Lady of the Snow Society was founded in 1888 in Williamsburg, Brooklyn. Located at 410 Graham Avenue, it is a mutual aid society that was created to assist Italian immigrants new to New York.

Every summer, Our Lady of the Snow hosts the annual Feast of Our Lady of the Snow. It begins with a candlelight procession through the streets of Williamsburg, and continues for several nights. A statue of Our Lady of Snow is held up for a procession through the street.
