= Bushwick Avenue =

Street in Brooklyn, New York

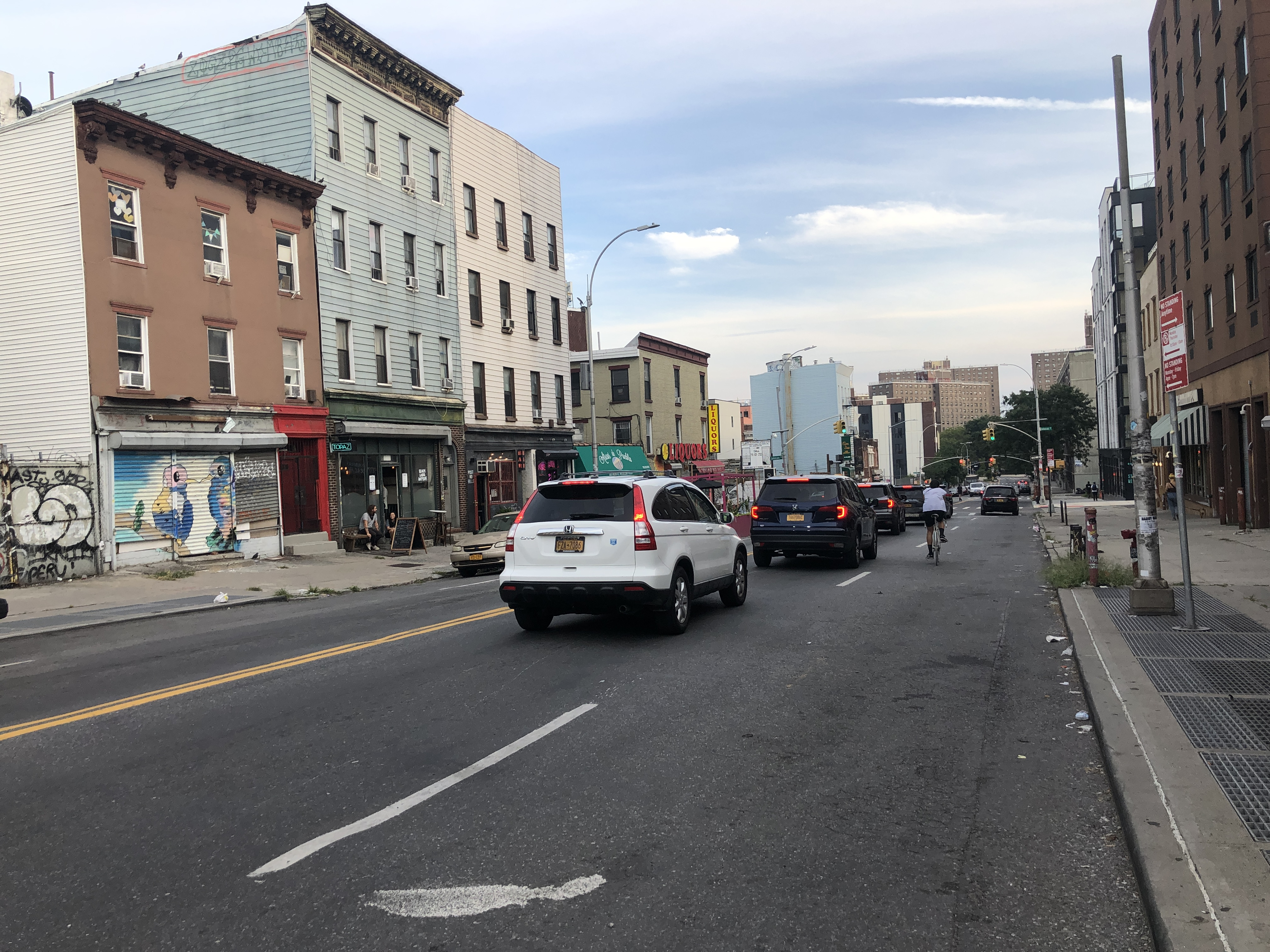
- View of Bushwick Avenue near Johnson Avenue
- Maintained by: NYCDOT
- Length: 3.6 mi (5.8 km)
- Location: Brooklyn, New York City
- Postal code: 11206, 11207, 11221
- Nearest metro station: Grand Street; Montrose Avenue; Bushwick Avenue–Aberdeen Street
- North end: Maspeth Avenue
- South end: Jamaica Avenue

Other
- Known for: Historic rowhouses, churches, subway access, Latin music and arts scene

Bushwick Avenue is a 3.6-mile long ⁣major avenue through Williamsburg, Bushwick, and Cypress Hills in the northeast portion of the New York City borough of Brooklyn.

== Route description ==
Bushwick Avenue begins one block north of Metropolitan Avenue in Williamsburg, where Woodpoint Road crosses Maspeth Avenue, becoming Bushwick Avenue as it does. It proceeds south through the area, acting as a dividing line between Williamsburg and East Williamsburg, then between Williamsburg and Bushwick, before crossing entirely into Bushwick as it crosses Flushing Avenue, shortly afterwards turning southeast. It then continues through the entire southwestern side of Bushwick, before finally terminating at a five-way intersection with Jamaica Avenue, the Jackie Robinson Parkway, and Pennsylvania Avenue not long after crossing into the Cypress Hills neighborhood. The avenue is known for its wide, tree-lined layout, and a mix of residential and commercial properties. It intersects several other major Brooklyn thoroughfares, including Grand Street, Myrtle Avenue, Gates Avenue, Chauncey Street, and Eastern Parkway.

== History ==
=== 17th to 20th centuries ===
Bushwick was originally inhabited by the Lenape people before European colonization. In 1613, the land was secured by the Dutch West India Company, which played a key role in the colonization of what would become New Netherland. By 1638, the company had secured the land, and in 1661, Governor Peter Stuyvesant chartered the area as Boswijck (Dutch for "little town in the woods").

Bushwick Avenue has a long and varied history within northern Brooklyn. Originally following parts of Old Woodpoint Road, the street evolved over time and absorbed sections of Old Bushwick Road (now Bushwick Place). In the early 20th century, planners proposed renaming it "Bushwick Boulevard", reflecting its intended role as a major thoroughfare. The name appeared in The Eastern District of Brooklyn (1912) and real estate advertisements, although the change was never officially adopted by the city. However, several building facades along the avenue still retain the engraved title "Boulevard," hinting at its ambitious design origins.

In the 19th century, Bushwick Avenue was developed into a residential boulevard, home to German-American immigrants, breweries, and houses of worship. The avenue’s brownstone architecture and wide roadways reflect the era’s urban planning style. As industry grew in Bushwick, the population expanded to include Italian, Puerto Rican, and Dominican communities by the early 20th century. By the 1970s, Bushwick Avenue and surrounding blocks faced sharp economic decline due to deindustrialization, redlining, and white flight. The 1977 New York City blackout had a severe impact on the neighborhood; over 25 fires were reported, and many businesses never reopened.

=== 21st century ===
Since the early 2000s, Bushwick Avenue has undergone rapid gentrification. As artists and young professionals were priced out of Williamsburg, many relocated east into Bushwick. Lofts, galleries, and artisanal cafés opened along the avenue, and property values rose sharply. Community activists have expressed concern over increasing rents and the displacement of longtime residents. Local organizations like Mi Casa No Es Su Casa and the Ridgewood Bushwick Senior Citizens Council have advocated for affordable housing and tenant protections. While the neighborhood continues to change, efforts have been made to preserve the architectural character and cultural history of Bushwick Avenue. Historic churches, murals, and rowhouses still line the street, providing a link to the avenue’s diverse past. In 2019, the New York City Department of City Planning released a Bushwick rezoning plan, which would allow for high-density development on Bushwick, Myrtle and Wyckoff Avenues.

== Transportation ==
Bushwick Avenue is served by several public transit options operated by the MTA.

=== Bus ===
Bushwick Avenue is served by multiple local bus routes, including:

- The B60, which runs north–south along Bushwick Avenue and Wilson Avenue, connecting neighborhoods from Williamsburg to Canarsie.
- The B38, which crosses Bushwick Avenue at DeKalb Avenue, offering crosstown service.

=== Subway ===
Bushwick Avenue is served by the New York City Subway's BMT Canarsie Line (L train) at the Bushwick Avenue–Aberdeen Street, Grand Street and Montrose Avenue stations.
