= Lowell (surname) =

Lowell is a surname, see "Lowell family" for name origin. Notable people with the surname include:

- The Lowell family, a prominent family name in England and America
- Abbe Lowell (born 1952), American defense attorney
- Abbott Lawrence Lowell (1856–1943), lawyer, historian, philanthropist, and former President of Harvard University
- Amy Lowell (1874–1925), poet, critic, publisher, and sister of Abbott Lawrence and Percival Lowell
- Andrea Lowell (born 1983), actress and model
- Anna Cabot Lowell (1819–1874), American writer
- Augustus Lowell (1830–1900), businessman, philanthropist, and father of Percival, Abbott Lawrence, and Amy Lowell
- Carey Lowell (born 1961), actress and wife of actor Richard Gere
- Catelynn Lowell (Catelynn Baltierra; born 1992), American reality television personality, author, and public speaker
- Charles Russell Lowell, Sr. (1782–1861), Unitarian pastor, son of The Old Judge, father of James Russell, and great-great grandfather of Robert Lowell
- Charles Russell Lowell (1835–1864), Union General and American Civil War hero
- Charlie Lowell (born 1973), keyboardist for Jars of Clay
- Chipper Lowell, American comedian
- Chris Lowell (born 1984), actor
- Christopher Lowell (Richard Lowell Madden; born 1955), interior decorator and television personality
- Delmar R. Lowell (1844–1912), pastor, Civil War veteran, and genealogist
- Edward Jackson Lowell (1845–1894), author, lawyer, and historian, and father of Guy Lowell
- Eric Lowell (born 1935), English footballer
- Frances Lowell (1886 – not earlier than 1952), American educational psychologist
- Francis Cabot Lowell (businessman) (1775–1817), businessman and namesake of Lowell, Massachusetts
- Francis Cabot Lowell (judge) (1855–1911), United States Congressman and Federal Judge
- Guy Lowell (1870–1927), architect and landscape designer
- Harry Lowell (born 1971), American television and feature film producer
- Helen Lowell (Helen Lowell Robb; 1866–1937), American stage and film actress
- James A. Lowell (1849–1900), Canadian merchant and politician
- James Arnold Lowell (1869–1933), American jurist
- James Russell Lowell (1819–1891), American poet and politician
- Joan Lowell (1902–1967), actress and newspaper reporter
- John Lowell (1743–1802), aka The Old Judge, United States Federal Judge appointed by President George Washington
- John Lowell, Jr. (lawyer) (1769–1840), aka The Boston Rebel, Federalist lawyer and son of The Old Judge
- John Lowell, Jr. (philanthropist) (1799–1836), son of Industrialist Francis Cabot Lowell and founder of the Lowell Institute
- John Amory Lowell (1798–1881), businessman and philanthropist
- John Lowell (judge) (1824–1897), United States Federal judge and son of John Amory Lowell
- Josephine Shaw Lowell (1843–1905), sister of American Civil War hero Robert Gould Shaw, first woman to hold a public office in New York City, and wife of Gen. Charles Russell Lowell
- Joshua A. Lowell (1801–1874), United States Representative from Maine (1839–1843)
- Maria White Lowell (1821–1853), poet, abolitionist, and wife of James Russell Lowell
- Mike Lowell (born 1974), baseball player for the Boston Red Sox
- Nathan Lowell (born 1952), American science fiction writer
- Norman Lowell (born 1946), founder of the extreme-right Maltese political party, Imperium Europa
- Orson Lowell (1871–1956), American artist and illustrator
- Percival Lowell (1855–1916), author, astronomer, founder of Lowell Observatory, and brother of Amy and Abbott Lawrence Lowell
- Ralph Lowell (1890–1978), businessman, philanthropist, and founding force behind Boston's WGBH public television
- Robert Lowell (1917–1977), poet and lecturer
- Rupe Lowell (1893–1980), Australian rules footballer
- Scott Lowell (born 1965), actor
- Spencer Lowell (born 1983), American photographer
- Tom Lowell (born 1941), American film and television actor
- Waverly Lowell, American archivist
- William Lowell Sr. (1863–1954), American dentist, inventor of a wooden golf tee
- William Lowell Jr. (1897–1976), manufacturer of golf tees and industrial packaging specialist

Fictional characters:

- Carmen Lowell, main character in the book and film The Sisterhood of the Traveling Pants
- Christopher Lowell, stage name for Richard Lowell Madden, interior designer and TV host
- Elizabeth Lowell, pen name for Ann Maxwell, popular romance writer
- Ellen Lowell, fictional character from the American daytime soap opera As the World Turns
- Seth Lowell, character from the video game Zenless Zone Zero
- Yuri Lowell, main character in the game Tales of Vesperia
