= Lowell =

Lowell may refer to:

== Places ==
=== United States ===
- Lowell, Arkansas
- Lowell, Florida
- Lowell, Idaho
- Lowell, Indiana
- Lowell, Maine
- Lowell, Massachusetts
  - Lowell National Historical Park
  - Lowell (MBTA station)
  - Lowell Ordnance Plant
- Lowell, Michigan
- Lowell, Missouri
- Lowell, Holt County, Missouri, an extinct trading post in Lincoln Township, Holt County, Missouri
- Lowell, North Carolina
- Lowell, Washington County, Ohio
- Lowell, Seneca County, Ohio
- Lowell, Oregon
- Lowell, Vermont, a New England town
  - Lowell (CDP), Vermont, the main village in the town
- Lowell, West Virginia
- Lowell (town), Wisconsin
  - Lowell, Wisconsin, a village within the town of Lowell
- Lowell Hill, California
- Lowell Point, Alaska
- Lowell Peak, near Seward, Alaska
- Lowell Peak (Chugach Mountains), near Whittier, Alaska
- Lowell Township (disambiguation)

=== Other countries ===
- Lowell glacier, near the Alsek River, Canada

=== Elsewhere ===
- Lowell (lunar crater)
- Lowell (Martian crater)
- 1886 Lowell, an asteroid

== Institutions in the United States ==
=== Arizona ===
- Lowell Observatory, astronomical non-profit research institute, Flagstaff

=== California ===
- Lowell High School (Whittier, California), high school, Whittier
- Lowell High School (San Francisco), high school, San Francisco

=== Indiana ===
- Lowell High School (Lowell, Indiana), high school, Lowell

=== Massachusetts ===
- Lowell Institute, educational foundation, Boston
- Lowell Line, train line, Boston
- Lowell House, Harvard undergrad dormitory, Cambridge
- Lowell Devils, hockey team, Lowell
- Lowell High School (Lowell, Massachusetts), high school, Lowell
- The Lowell, a historic apartment building, Cambridge
- The Sun (Lowell), newspaper, Lowell, Massachusetts
- University of Massachusetts Lowell

=== Michigan ===
- Lowell High School (Michigan), high school, Lowell

== Other uses ==
- Lowell (musician), Canadian singer
- Lowell (given name)
- Lowell (surname)
- Lowell family, a prominent family name in England and America
- Hurricane Lowell (disambiguation), the name given to three tropical cyclones in the Eastern Pacific Ocean
- USS Lowell (SP-504), a United States Navy patrol vessel and minesweeper in commission from 1917 to 1919

== See also ==
- Lovell (disambiguation)
