= Herbert Woodrow =

American psychologist (1883–1974)

Herbert H. Woodrow
- Born: February 25, 1883; Chillicothe, Ohio
- Died: June 14, 1974 (aged 91); Champaign, Illinois
- Education: Columbia University
- Scientific career
- Fields: Psychology

Herbert Hollingsworth Woodrow (February 25, 1883 – June 14, 1974) was an American psychologist. He served as president of the American Psychological Association in 1941 and was a faculty member at several universities. He was a first cousin of Woodrow Wilson.

== Biography ==
=== Early life ===
Herbert Woodrow was born in Chillicothe, Ohio on February 25, 1883. His father, Thomas Woodrow, was an immigrant from England. His grandfather and several ancestors were Scotch Presbyterian ministers. Herbert Woodrow was a first cousin of President Woodrow Wilson. The president, whose birth name was Thomas Woodrow Wilson, had been named after Herbert's father. Herbert Woodrow graduated from the University of Michigan and earned a PhD from Columbia University.

=== Career ===
In 1919, Woodrow wrote Brightness and Dullness in Children. A review in The Journal of Education said, "Dr. Herbert Woodrow has made a distinct and remarkable contribution to progress in his emphasis of the distinction between 'Dullness and Brightness in Children.' It is a work that simply must be carefully read by every one who desires to demonstrate intelligence in the study of intelligence."

Woodrow served as president of the American Psychological Association (APA) in 1941. He was the fourth University of Minnesota faculty member to assume the APA presidency in the first half of the 20th century. Woodrow had been president of the Midwestern Psychological Association in 1932.

=== Legacy ===
The University of Illinois awards the Herbert Woodrow Fellowship to a psychology graduate student who excels in basic scientific research.

== Selected works ==
=== Books ===
- Brightness and Dullness in Children (1919)

=== Journal articles ===
- Woodrow, Herbert; Lowell, Frances (1916). "Children's Association Frequency Tables". Psychological Monographs: General and Applied. 22 (5): i-110. doi:10.1037/h0093111. hdl:21.11116/0000-0001-922F-6.
- Woodrow, Herbert (1932). "The Effect of Rate of Sequence Upon the Accuracy of Synchronization". Journal of Experimental Psychology. 15 (4): 357–379. doi:10.1037/h0071256.
- Woodrow, Herbert (1940). "The Problem of the Interrelationship of Determining Conditions". Psychological Monographs. 52 (3): 1–8. doi:10.1037/h0093554.
- Woodrow, Herbert (January 1942). "The Problem of General Quantitative Laws in Psychology". Psychological Bulletin. 39 (1): 1–27. doi:10.1037/h0058275.
