= Tropical Storm Lowell (2008) =

Pacific tropical storm in 2008

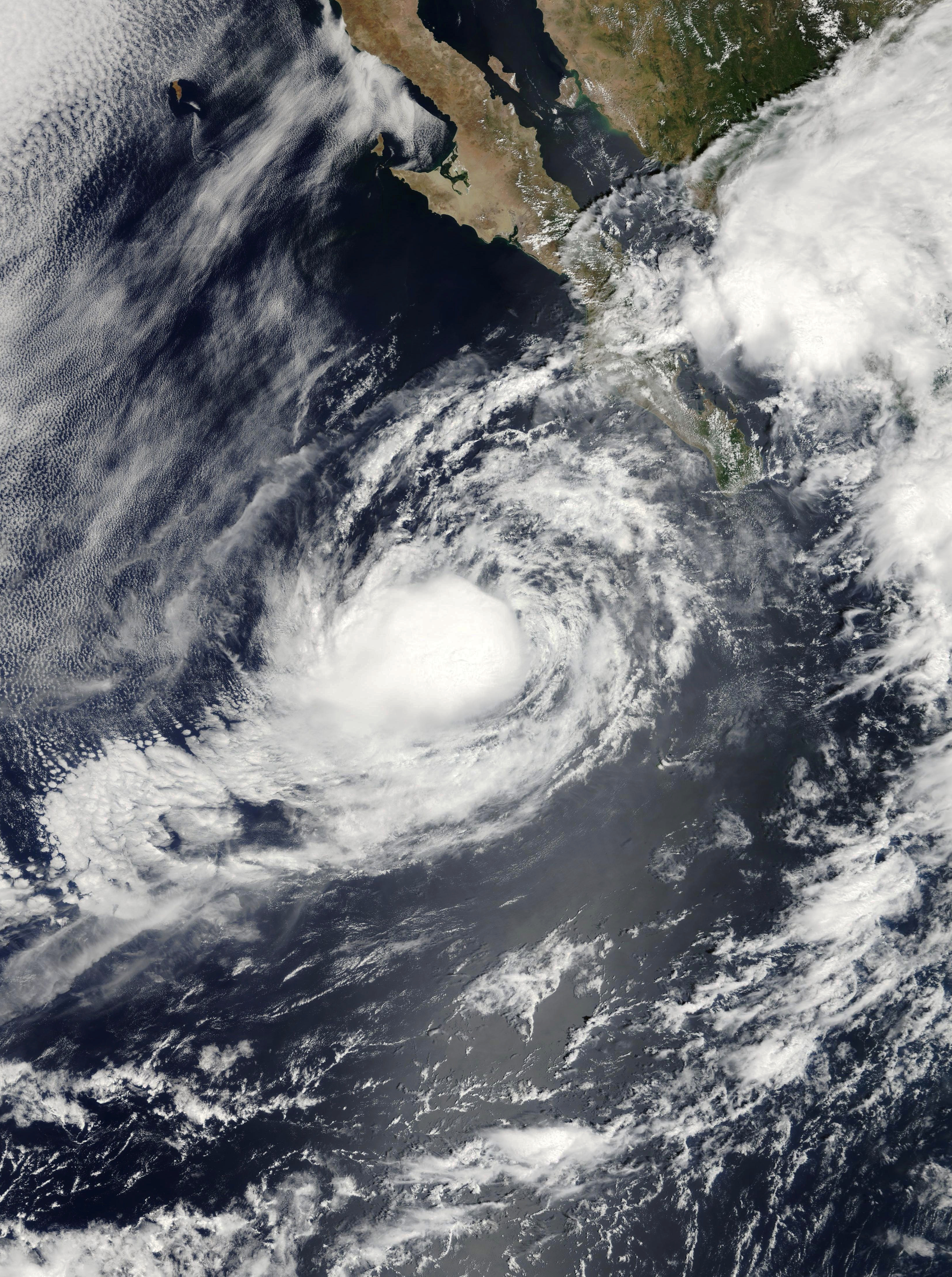
- Lowell of the Mexican coast on September 9

Meteorological history
- Formed: September 6, 2008
- Dissipated: September 11, 2008

Tropical storm
- 1-minute sustained (SSHWS/NWS)
- Highest winds: 50 mph (85 km/h)
- Lowest pressure: 998 mbar (hPa); 29.47 inHg

Overall effects
- Fatalities: 6 direct
- Damage: $15.5 million (2008 USD)
- Areas affected: Baja California Sur, Mexico, New Mexico, Texas, Colorado, Oklahoma, Kansas
- IBTrACS
- Part of the 2008 Pacific hurricane season

Tropical Storm Lowell was a moderate tropical storm that developed during the 2008 Pacific hurricane season. The fourteenth tropical cyclone and thirteen named storm of the season, Lowell formed out of a western side of a trough on September 6. It quickly intensified into Tropical Storm Lowell, peaking as a moderate tropical storm. It pass directly over Socorro Island and began a weakening trend. It weakened into depression before landfall in Baja California Sur and dissipated before striking Sonora. It later joined with a frontal boundary and Hurricane Ike which caused severe damage as far inland as Chicago. In all, the storm had caused 6 deaths and $15.5 million damage.

== Meteorological history ==
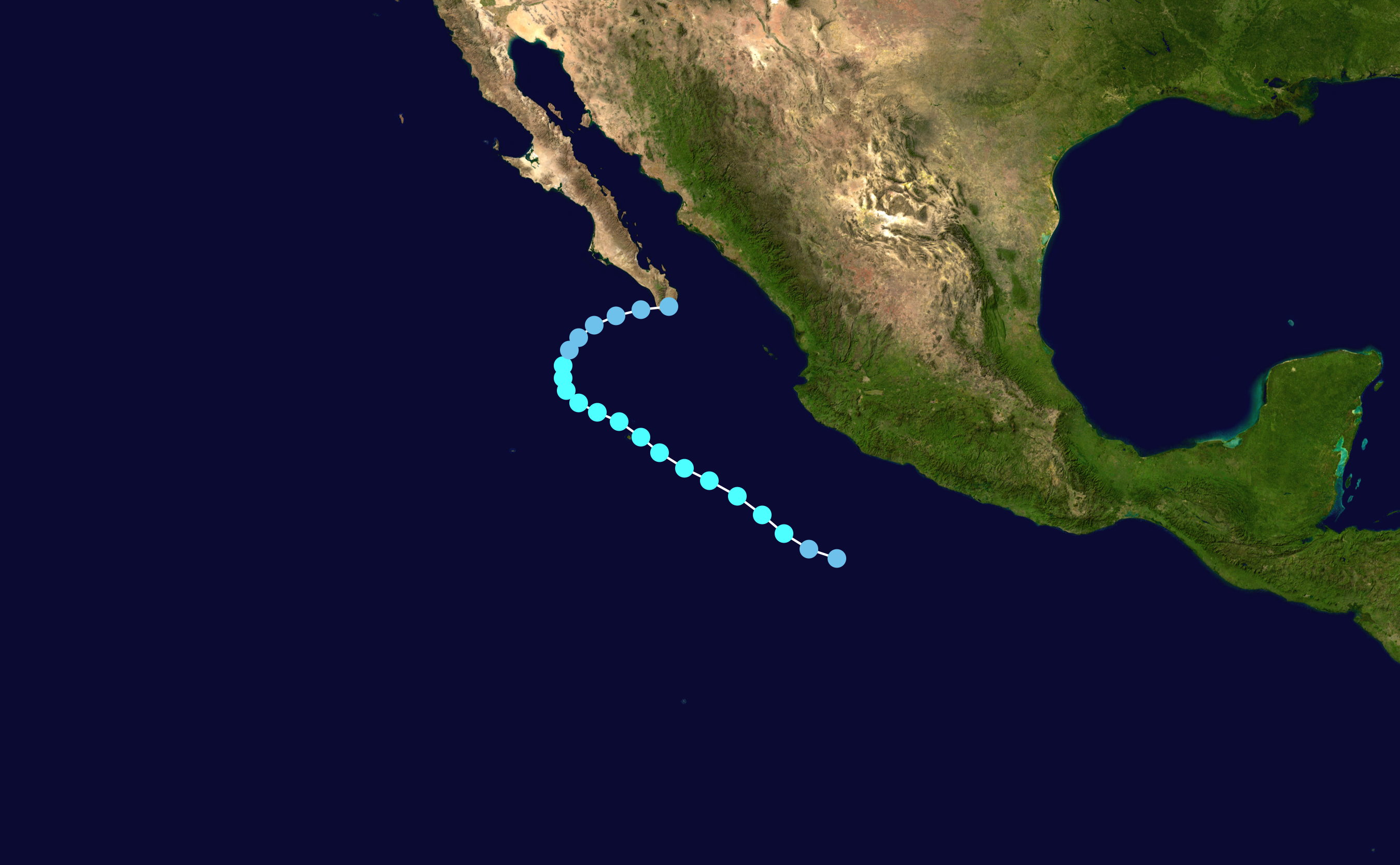
Map plotting the storm's track and intensity, according to the Saffir–Simpson scale Map key Saffir–Simpson scale Tropical depression (≤38 mph, ≤62 km/h) Tropical storm (39–73 mph, 63–118 km/h) Category 1 (74–95 mph, 119–153 km/h) Category 2 (96–110 mph, 154–177 km/h) Category 3 (111–129 mph, 178–208 km/h) Category 4 (130–156 mph, 209–251 km/h) Category 5 (≥157 mph, ≥252 km/h) Unknown Storm type Tropical cyclone Subtropical cyclone Extratropical cyclone, remnant low, tropical disturbance, or monsoon depression

The origin of Lowell began from a tropical wave that moved off Africa. The northern portion of the wave would form into Hurricane Hanna in the Atlantic. The southern portion of the wave separated and continued to move westward across the Caribbean and crossed Central America during August 27 and August 28. Later a trough with a weak low pressure area developed over southern Mexico, The area of low pressure was found embedded within a large area of scattered moderate and isolated strong convection. The initial low failed to develop but a new low formed on western side of the trough. A larger cyclonic circulation associated with the trough and induced a gradual increase in deep convection. The low level convection center was temporarily displaced from the convection, and a smaller embedded circulation developed and was eventually detached from the larger circulation. It is estimated that a tropical depression formed at 1200 UTC 6 September when it was centered about 310 mi (500 km) south of Manzanillo, Mexico.

As convective banding formed, the depression gradually intensified and was upgraded a Tropical Storm Lowell six hours later. A deep-layer anticyclone over Mexico steered Lowell northwestward until September 8. However, strong upper-level winds on the south side of the anticyclone produced strong northeasterly to easterly wind shear over the tropical cyclone for several days. Due to the shear, the low level convection became exposed and sheared. despite this, Lowell slowly strengthened and reached a peak intensity of 50 mph (85 km/h), it then passed near Socorro Island without any known damage. The shear had lessened over the system, but with stable and dry air, the storm begin to weaken. Lowell moved towards north and northeast due to a subtropical ridge northwest of the system. It downgraded to a tropical depression at 0600 UTC 10 September as it was moving north-northeastward about 259 mi (417 km) west-southwest of the southern tip of Baja California. Thunderstorm activity near the center had increased slightly on 10 September. The circulation began to slowly spin down as it made landfall around Cabo San Lucas, Mexico at 0900 UTC 11 September. As it made landfall the mid to upper level winds left the low level center exposed form the thunderstorm activity. Lowell degenerated into an elongated surface trough that extended across the southern Gulf of California. It followed a squall line and a frontal boundary and quickly dissipated. The remnant low produced rain across Northwestern Mexico, it later joined Hurricane Ike and caused damage further inland.

== Preparations and impacts ==
=== Mexico ===
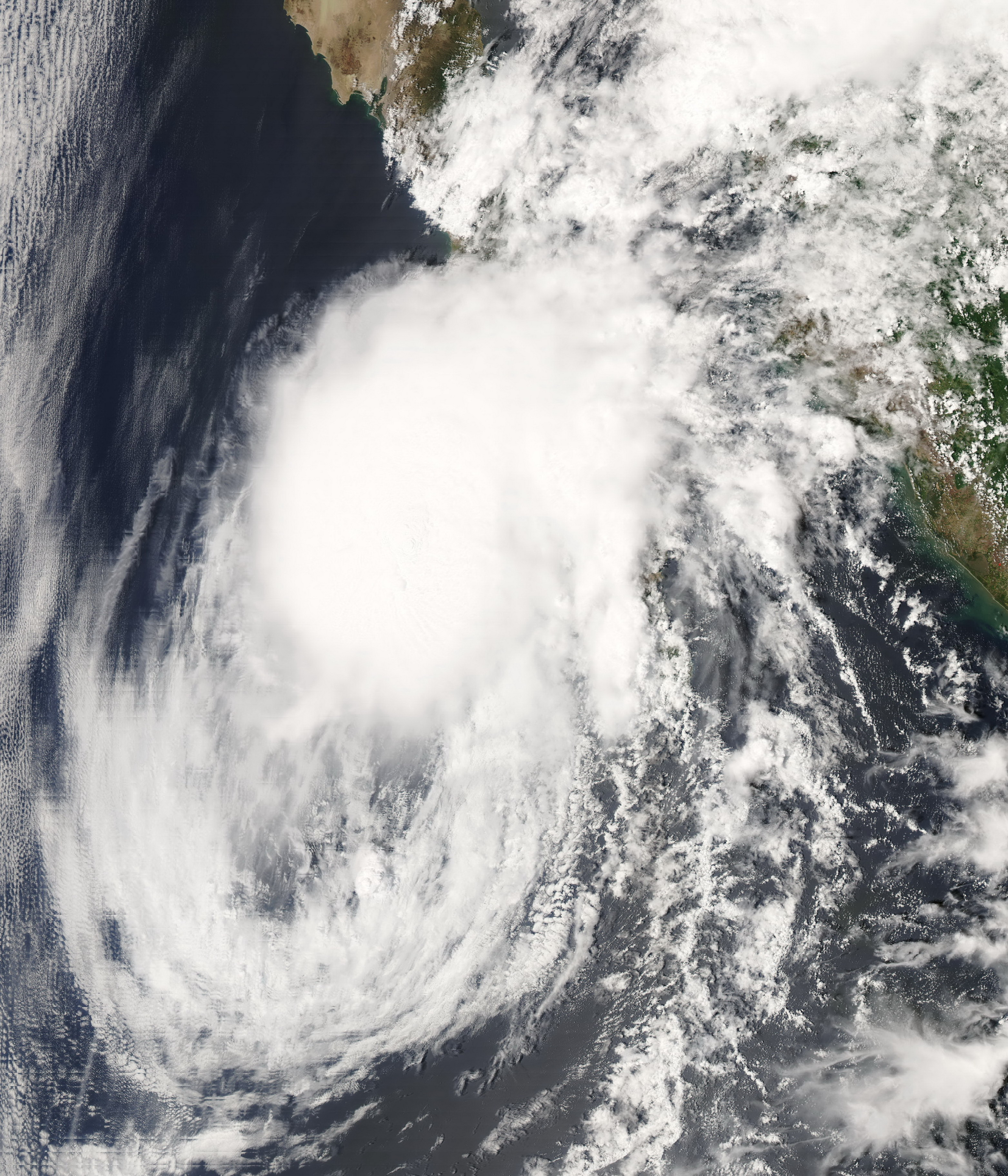
Tropical Storm Lowell nearing Baja California Peninsula on September 10

On September 9, 2100 UTC a Tropical Storm Watch was issued from Bahía Magdalena to Cabo San Lucas and ended on September 11 0900 UTC. Heavy rainfall from the remnants of Lowell caused streams and canals to overflow in the Mexican states of Sonora and Sinaloa, leaving more than 26,500 people homeless. The cities of Navojoa, Benito Juárez, Huatabampo, and Etchojoa were most affected. The government of Sonora has estimated the damage in that state at 200 million pesos (about 15.5 million US dollars). In its impact route to Baja California Sur, Tropical Storm Lowell causing heavy rains and strong waves, forcing the closure of the port of Cabo San Lucas and the suspension of at least two cruises from Los Angeles, California with more than 2 thousand passengers each. Impact in Baja California Sur, Tropical Storm Lowell causing heavy rains and strong waves, forcing the closure of the port of Cabo San Lucas and the suspension of at least two cruises from Los Angeles, California, with more than 2 thousand passengers each. In its advance, the weather with winds up to 95 kilometers per hour, wreaking havoc on the coast of the Pacific, from Sonora to Nayarit, where they established the green alert (phase approach) by the heavy rains and storm surges. The director of civil protection in Baja California Sur, Jose Gajón of the Toba, said that Lowell has a radius of 800 km so that the whole body is on alert green.

Classes were suspended in Sinaloa, bad weather caused by the weather associated with a low pressure system, caused the closure of boating in the bay Altata and the port of Topolobampo. Flood victims evacuated. The Secretary of Administration and Finance, Óscar Lara, said that permits were granted exemption from payment of toll motorway Culiacán-Las Brisas for vehicles, by flooding in the villages of the municipality of Navolato. In the city of Los Mochis, the mayor, Esteban Valenzuela, said the rain caused the suspension of classes in schools. In Nayarit, the excess water in the marshes and estuaries affect fishermen suffer low catches of shrimp. The State Civil Protection Unit in Sonora blue alert issued for 16 municipalities of the entity and the green alert for 13 locations in the south to the vicinity of Lowell. Recount Damage In Chihuahua, the rains over the past 15 days left six people dead, more than a thousand communities, 15 thousand hectares of crops flooded, 50 solitary and 43 other villages without drinking water. The secretary of Public Security, Javier Cardona Torres, said that after the declaration of emergency Parral and Valle de Allende, these municipalities will help the Natural Disaster Fund. Also released this instance support for municipalities Aldama Coyame, Ojinaga, San Francisco de Conchos, Camargo, La Cruz and Julimes. In Durango and Coahuila, after the opening of the floodgates of dams Lázaro Cárdenas and Francisco Zarco, Civil Protection authorities evacuated thousands of residents in the communities of Abasolo and Rodeo in Durango, while the Comarca Lagunera, Coahuila, was working in strengthening of the river Nazas board.

=== United States ===
The remnants of Lowell later merged with a frontal boundary over the central United States and caused heavy rainfall and flooding one to two days before the remnants of Hurricane Ike passed through the region. Heavy rainfall, including multiple 24-hour records, occurred from West Texas northeast to Kansas and northern Illinois and Indiana. Wichita, Kansas, measured a daily record 10.31 inches (262 mm) of rain on 12 September and broke the 24-hour rainfall record of 7.99 inches (203 mm) that had been held since 1911. Lubbock, Texas, measured a 24-hour record rainfall of 7.80 inches (198 mm) which broke the previous record of 5.83 inches (148 mm) set in October 1983. Chicago, Illinois, reported 6.64 inches (169 mm) at O’Hare International Airport, the highest one-day total since records began in 1871. This amount broke the previous daily record of 6.49 inches (165 mm) set in 1987. Numerous people were rescued from stranded vehicles as rainfall flooded city streets. The storm killed two people in Kansas, and another two in Illinois.

== See also ==
- Timeline of 2008 Pacific hurricane season
- Other storms of the same name
