= Spencer Lowell =

American photographer

- Born: 1983 (age 42–43); Los Angeles
- Education: Art Center College of Design
- Known for: Photography
- Website: www.spencerlowell.com

Spencer Lowell (born 1983) is an American photographer based in Los Angeles.

Lowell first gained international attention with his photographs of the Mars rover in 2007. He has contributed photographs to cover stories of publications such as Time, Wired, Fortune, and Popular Science. His works have been described as pairing "scientific pragmatism with an unbridled creative energy."

== Career and style ==
Lowell was born and grew up in Los Angeles. He became a photographer at the age of 16, working for a one-hour photo lab. After high school, he worked in several camera stores and labs while practicing photography as a hobby.

During his last semester at Art Center College of Design, Lowell took a printmaking class. Since he had always been fascinated by space exploration, he created a series of platinum palladium prints of Hubble imagery. Printing them as negatives, Lowell created an analogy for the creation of art: wherever the emulsion was left on the paper, that would be where matter was forming in space. When Lowell displayed the prints for his graduation exhibition in 2007, he met Dan Goods, the visual strategist for NASA’s Jet Propulsion Laboratory, who commissioned him to photograph labs and scientists at JPL. Taking an interest in the Mars rover Curiosity project, he photographed it throughout its construction for over two years. The photos were picked up by several major magazines, including a ten-page story in Wired UK. According to Lowell himself, this work propelled his career.

In 2012, Lowell was an artist-in-residence of the Tara Oceans expedition. He rejoined Tara in 2014, documenting the work of the sailors and the scientists who analyzed plastic pollution in the Mediterranean Sea.

Lowell has contributed photographs to several cover stories in major magazines. He made his first cover for Time on 30 September 2014, when the first case of Ebola had been diagnosed in the United States. As the magazine was to go to print the next day, Lowell conceptualized, pre-produced, shot, edited and retouched the cover image (a man in a hazmat suit) in a single day.

Much of his commercial portfolio includes portraits of scientists and technology, such as an auto plant, an airborne research lab, an "infrastructure tourist", or a work of art that is powered by magnetism. His works have been described as pairing "scientific pragmatism with an unbridled creative energy."

In 2016, a series of images by Lowell was acquired by the Queens Museum. Entitled New York City, New York, the photos were of a very large scale model in its collection, thePanorama of the City of New York, and also sold by the museum at the Frieze Art Fair.

== Personal life ==
Spencer Lowell lives in New York with his wife and two sons.
