= Lovell =

Lovell may refer to:

== People ==
- Lovell (surname), with a list of people
- Lovell Cook (born 1990), American basketball player
- Lovell Pinkney (born 1972), American football player
- Lovell Rousseau (1818–1869), Union Army general of the American Civil War

== Places ==
=== United States ===
- Lovell, Maine, a town
- Lovell, Ohio, an unincorporated community
- Lovell, Oklahoma, a census-designated place
- Lovell, Wyoming, a town
- Chattanooga Metropolitan Airport (Lovell Field), Chattanooga, Tennessee

=== Elsewhere ===
- Lovell (crater), on the Moon
- Minster Lovell, Oxfordshire, England
- Lovell Telescope, Jodrell Bank, Cheshire, England

== See also ==
- Lovells (disambiguation)
- Lowell (disambiguation)
