= George Franklin Grant =

American academic (1846–1910)

Dr. George Franklin Grant
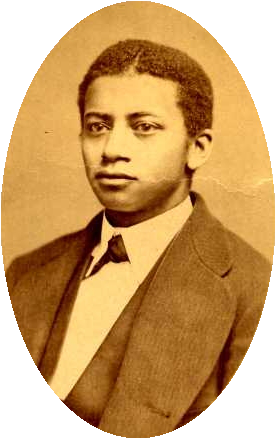
- Grant in 1870
- Born: September 15, 1846; Oswego, New York
- Died: August 21, 1910 (aged 63); Chester, New Hampshire
- Education: Harvard School of Dental Medicine class of 1870
- Occupations: Dentist, academic, inventor
- Spouse: Georgina H. Smith
- Children: Maybelle C.Grant (Mrs. Alfred P. Russell); George F. Grant, Jr. Frances O. Grant Theodora Grant, Helene Grant
- Parent(s): Phillis Pitt; Tudor Elandor Grant

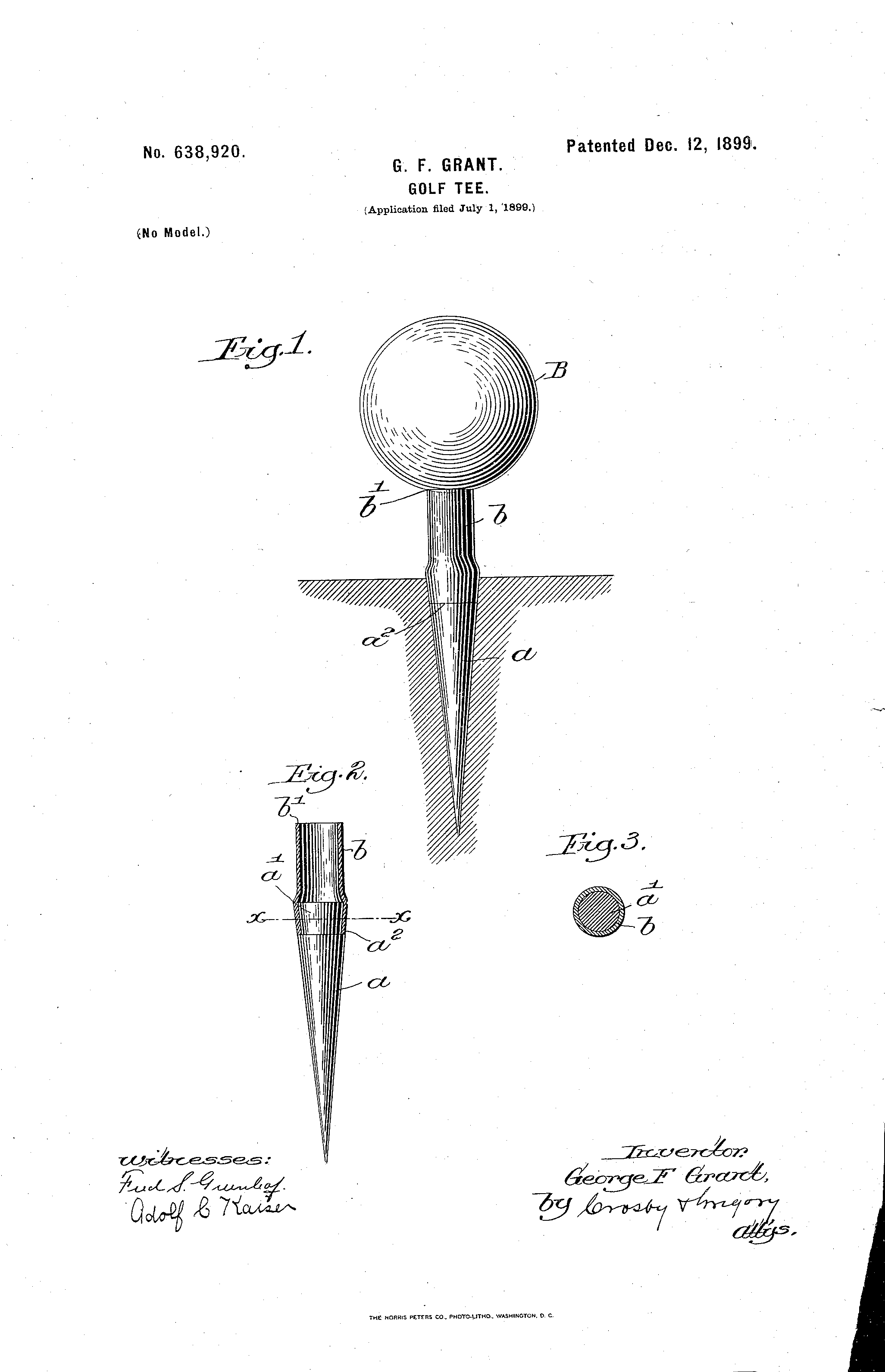
Golf tee patent, granted December 12, 1899

George Franklin Grant (September 15, 1846 – August 21, 1910) was the first African-American professor at Harvard. He was also a Boston dentist, and an inventor of an early composite golf tee made from wood and natural rubber (specifically, gutta-percha) tubing.

== Biography ==
Grant was born on September 15, 1846, in Oswego, New York, to Phillis Pitt and Tudor Elandor Grant. He attended the Bordentown School in Bordentown, New Jersey.

He entered the Harvard Dental School (now the Harvard School of Dental Medicine) in 1868, and graduated in 1870. He then took a position in the department of mechanical dentistry in 1871, making him Harvard University's first African-American faculty member.

Grant was a founding member and later the president of the Harvard Odontological Society and was a member of the Harvard Dental Alumni Association where he was elected president in 1881.

He specialized in treating patients with cleft palate, a congenital condition in which the bones and soft tissue in the roof of the mouth are not closed. Grant invented and patented a prosthetic device he called the oblate palate, worn by patients to help them speak and eat more normally.

On December 12, 1899, he received U.S. patent No. 638,920, the first patent for a wooden golf tee.

Grant died on August 21, 1910, at his vacation home in Chester, New Hampshire, of liver disease.

== Patent ==
- U.S. patent 638,920

== See also ==
- William Lowell Sr., another golf tee inventor
