= Lowell (given name) =

Lowell is a given name. Notable people with the name include:

- Sir Cuthbert Lowell Ackroyd, 1st Baronet (1892–1973), of the Ackroyd Baronetcy of Dewsbury and Lord Mayor of London (1955–56)
- Godfrey Lowell Cabot (1861–1962), businessman and philanthropist
- Julian Lowell Coolidge (1873–1954), mathematician
- Abbott Lowell Cummings (1923–2017), noted Yale architectural historian
- Lowell Bergman (born 1945), investigative reporter and television news magazine producer
- Lowell Cowell (1945–2018), former NASCAR Cup Series driver
- Lowell E. English (1915–2005), USMC Maj. General
- Lowell Fulson (1921–1999), blues guitarist
- Lowell Ganz (born 1948), television producer and screenwriter
- Lowell George (1945–1979), songwriter, guitarist and late member of the band Little Feat
- Lowell E. Jones, American mathematician
- Lowell Lewis (born 1952), Chief Minister of Montserrat
- Richard Lowell Madden (born 1955), television personality and interior decorator a.k.a. Christopher Lowell
- Lowell Mason (1792–1872), gospel composer
- Lowell B. Mason (1893–1983), chair of the Federal Trade Commission
- Lowell Palmer (born 1947), MLB pitcher
- Lowell W. Perry (1931–2001), NFL player, coach, and sports commentator
- William Lowell Putnam (1861–1923), banker, lawyer, and philanthropist
- Lowell Ward Rooks (1893−1973), American army officer
- Lowell Sherman (1885–1934), actor, film director
- Lowell Smith (1892–1945), pioneer airman
- Lowell Thomas (1892–1981), newsman, radio and newsreel host best known as the man who made Lawrence of Arabia
- Lowell Thomas Jr. (1923–2016), film and television producer, Alaskan Senator, and Alaskan Lt. Governor.
- Lowell Weicker (1931–2023), former US Representative, Senator and Connecticut Governor
- Ava Lowle Willing (1868–1958), Philadelphia socialite and ex-wife of John Jacob Astor IV
- Lowell Wright (born 2003), Canadian soccer player

Fictional characters:

- Lowell Mather, character on TV sitcom Wings played by actor Thomas Haden Church
