= William Lowell Jr. =

- Ernest Lowell, William Lowell Sr., and William Lowell Jr. circa 1940
- Born: December 19, 1897
- Died: May 13, 1976 (aged 78); Muhlenberg Regional Medical Center; Plainfield, New Jersey
- Spouse: Katherine Macpherson
- Parent: William Lowell Sr.

William Lowell Jr. (December 19, 1897 – May 13, 1976) was a manufacturer of golf tees at Reddy Tee Company and an industrial packaging specialist.

== Biography ==
He was the son of William Lowell Sr. and was married to Katherine Macpherson. He took over his father's company. His father started the Reddy Tee Company and patented a wooden tee for golf. The company was sold to Red Devil, Inc. in 1933. He then moved to Union Bag Company where he worked on developing the six pack carton.

He retired in 1961 and had been living in Fanwood, New Jersey and died at Muhlenberg Regional Medical Center in Plainfield, New Jersey in 1976.
