= Lovells (disambiguation) =

Lovells is a London-based international law firm that merged with Hogan & Hartson in 2010 to form Hogan Lovells.

Lovells may also refer to:

- Lovells Township, Michigan, USA
- Lovells Athletic F.C., a former works football club for Lovell's sweet factory in Newport, South Wales, England
- Lovells Island, Massachusetts, USA

== See also ==
- Lovell (disambiguation)
