= Panorama of the City of New York =

Architectural model of New York City

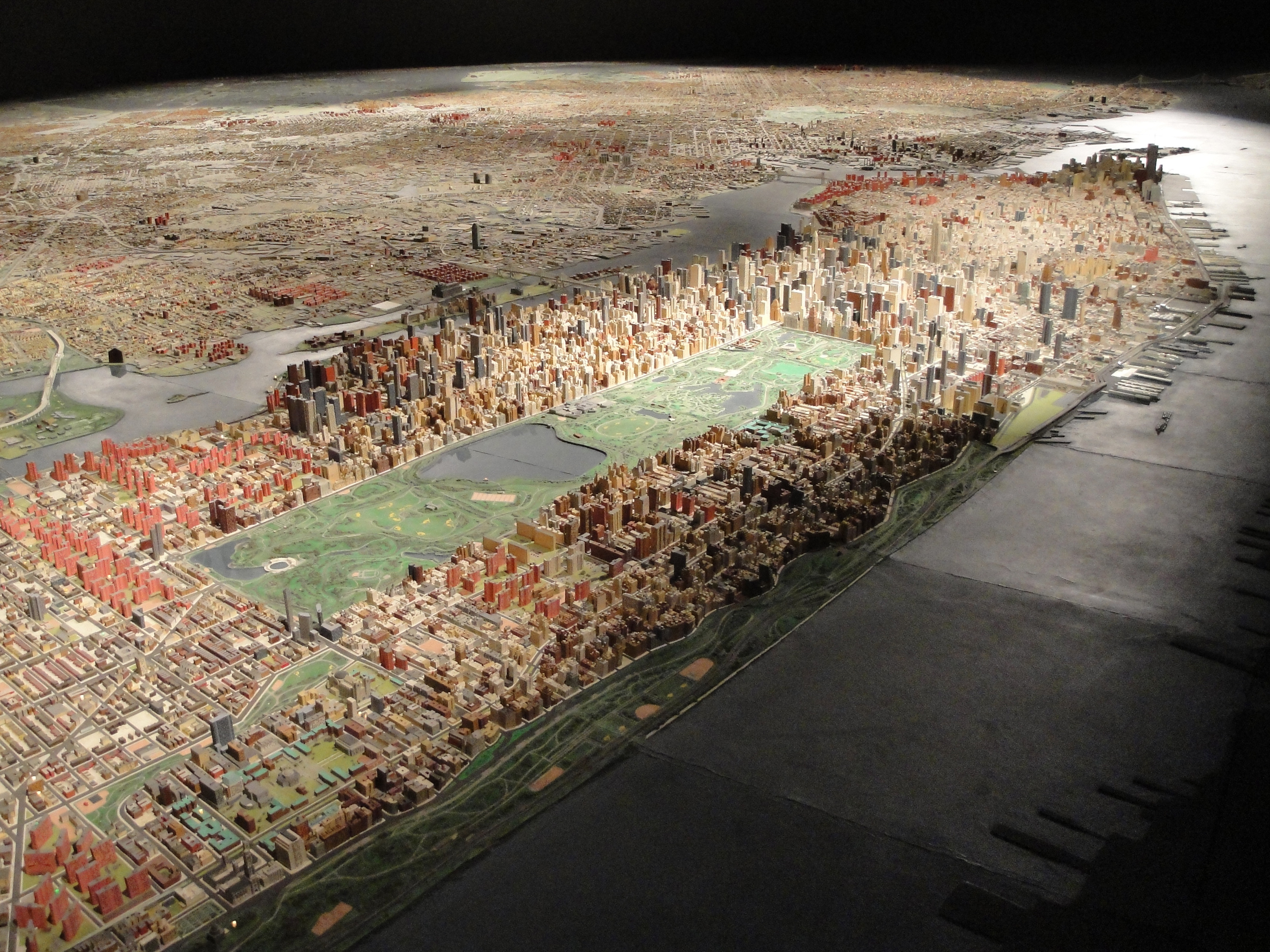
The Panorama of the City of New York in 2011

The Panorama of the City of New York is an urban model of New York City that is a centerpiece of the Queens Museum. It was originally created for the 1964 New York World's Fair and it has been occasionally updated.

== Early history ==
In June 1961, the New York City Board of Estimate awarded a contract to the architectural model makers Raymond Lester Associates for the construction of a scale model of New York City within the City Building. City officials planned to install suspended cars to allow visitors to see the model during the 1964 New York World's Fair. The Panorama was built by a team of 100 people working for Lester Associates in West Nyack, New York in the three years before the opening of the 1964 World's Fair.

Commissioned by World's Fair Corporation president Robert Moses as a celebration of the City's municipal infrastructure, this 9,335-square-foot (867.2 m^{2}) model includes every single building constructed before 1992 in all five boroughs, at a scale of 1 inch = 100 feet (1:1200). The model was constructed in 273 sections of 4 by 10 feet (1.2 m × 3.0 m) Formica boards and polyurethane foam, originally depicting 835,000 individual structures. The section showing the Far Rockaway neighborhood was never installed, due to space limitations. The original Panorama included about 25,000 Plexiglass models of major buildings, 100,000 handmade models of less substantial structures, and 50,000 models of churches. For other structures such as tenements and brownstones, Lester Associates created 50,000 copies of each type of structure. In total, Lester Associates manufactured about two to three million buildings, including duplicates.

Displayed alongside the modern city, the 1964 exhibition also included a 1:300 diorama of a "Castello Model" based on the 17th century Castello Plan, borrowed from Museum of the City of New York.

The Panorama was one of the most successful attractions at the 1964 Fair, with millions of people paying 10 cents each for a 9-minute simulated helicopter ride around the City, a dark ride narrated by Lowell Thomas to a text written by Harvey Yale Gross. It was one of three colossal representations of geography at the fair, alongside the Unisphere and the New York State Pavilion. Visitors could also look at the model from a balcony and, for another 10 cents, could peer at specific neighborhoods using binoculars.

The panorama was also intended to serve as a standing urban planning tool after the fair, after Moses' vision. In this way it anticipated the technology of a 3D city model, though in practice it was of limited utility. It did however, play a role in the defeat of Donald Trump's 1980s Television City proposal, as a model put on the panorama by activists demonstrated the relative size of the development. Additionally, the opening of the Panorama was set to coincide with the 300-year anniversary of the English takeover of New Amsterdam—which occurred in 1664—and highlight the city's growth over that period.

After the Fair closed, the Panorama remained open to the public, and Lester's team updated the map in 1967, 1968, and 1969.

== Later history ==
After another update in 1974, very few changes were made until 1992, when again Lester Associates was hired to update the model to coincide with the re-opening of the museum, after a two-year total renovation of the building by Rafael Viñoly. The model makers changed over 60,000 structures to bring it up-to-date at that time. There are now 895,000 structures total, including buildings made of plastic or wood. There are also bridges made of brass. The mechanical "helicopter" vehicles for conveying exhibition visitors were showing signs of wear, and were removed before the 1994 reopening. The current installation by Viñoly features accessible ramps and an elevated walkway which surround the Panorama, allowing viewers to proceed at their own pace, or to linger for as long a look as they desire. Because of space constraints, portions of the walkway are cantilevered over the outer edges of the map, but a glass floor still allows views of the model below. As in the original installation, tiny scale model airplanes take off and land at the model airport of LaGuardia Airport, mechanically guided by long wires.

In March 2009, the museum announced the intention to update the Panorama on an ongoing basis. To raise funds and draw public attention, the museum will allow individuals and developers to have accurate scale models made of buildings newer than the 1992 update created and added, in exchange for a donation of at least $50. More-detailed models of smaller apartment buildings and private homes, now represented by generic models, can also be added.

As of 2025, the original Twin Towers of the World Trade Center are still on the map, even though some new buildings have been built on the actual site; the museum has chosen to allow the destroyed structures to remain until construction is complete, rather than representing the ongoing construction. The first new building to be added under the new program was the new Citi Field stadium of the New York Mets; the model of the old Shea Stadium was to be displayed elsewhere in the museum.

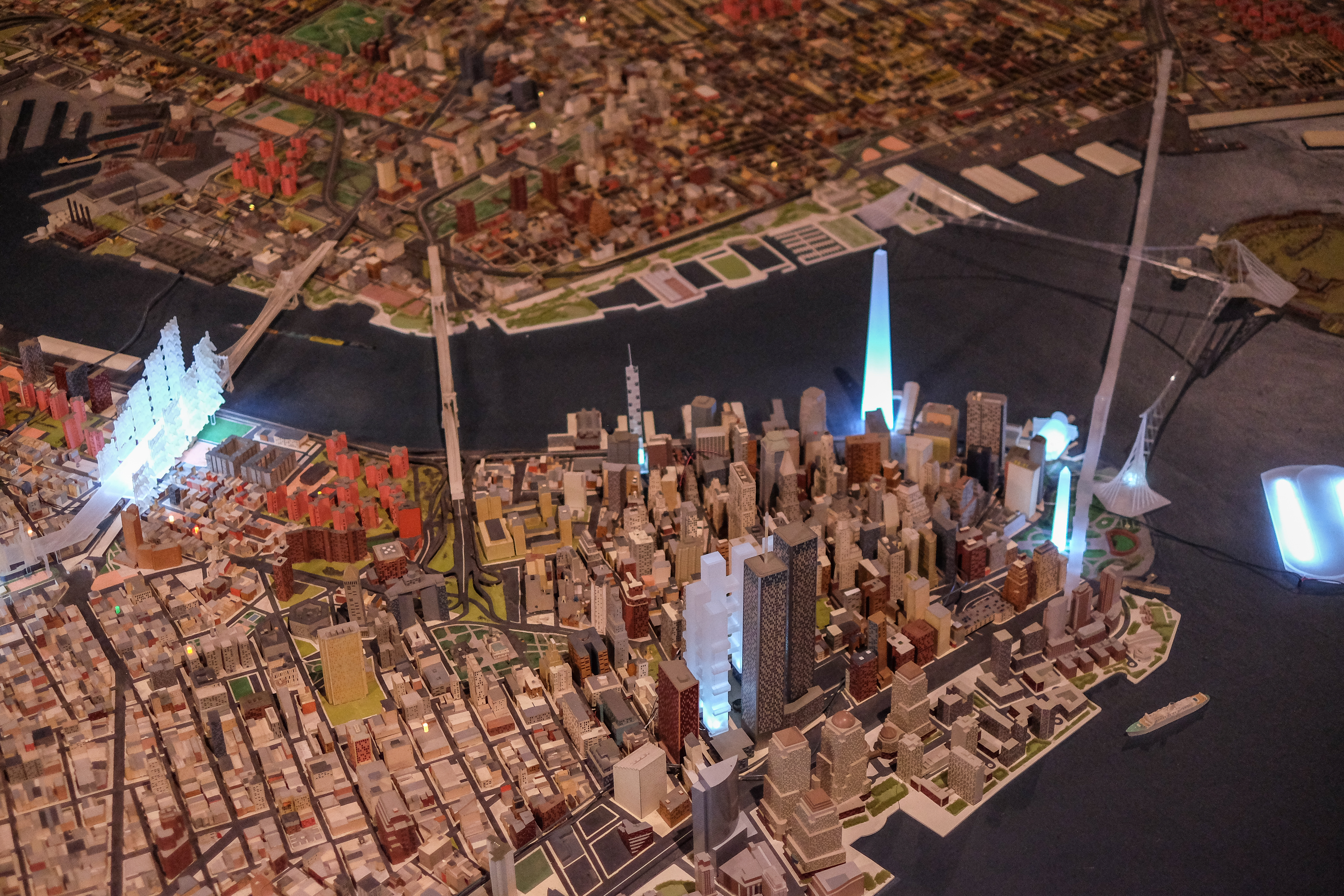
The Panorama with additions from the temporary exhibition Never Built New York in 2017.

The New York City Panorama was featured in two 2011 fictional works: the movie New Year's Eve directed by Garry Marshall, and the book Wonderstruck by Brian Selznick, and also in a subsequent Wonderstruck film. A revamped lighting system was installed in 2017, as part of a sponsorship promoting the film. Photographer Spencer Lowell took images of the model in the art series New York, New York, New York in 2016, and these were acquired by the museum and versions were sold at art fairs. The model was also featured in the 2021 documentary series Pretend It's a City. Every year, the Queens Museum hosts the "Panorama Challenge", a trivia contest run by The City Reliquary; the inaugural contest was held in 2007. Contestants use the Panorama to identify various New York City landmarks.

In recent years, the panorama has often functioned as installation art, providing context for temporary site-specific works taking the form of model buildings, or otherwise displayed in the panorama's gallery.

A scale model of the 1964 New York World's Fair site, showing all the buildings and pavilions of the time, is located in a separate area devoted to World's Fair exhibits. It is built to the same scale as the Panorama by Lester and Associates, and was one of originally 7 travelling models. A larger model of the Fair site that was 1 inch : 32 feet was the one exhibited there in 1964.

== See also ==
- Shanghai Urban Planning Exhibition Center
- Museum of Roman Civilization
