= William Lowell Sr. =

- From left to right are: Ernest Lowell, William Lowell Sr., and William Lowell Jr.
- Born: 1863; Hoboken, New Jersey, US
- Died: June 24, 1954 (aged 91); East Orange, New Jersey, US
- Occupation: Dentist
- Children: William Lowell Jr., Ernest Lowell, Elisabeth Lowell, Isabel Lowell Niebling (1892-1981), and Carol Lowell Favre (1903-1987)

William Lowell Sr. (1863 – June 24, 1954) was a dentist and an inventor of a wooden golf tee.

== Biography ==
William Lowell was born in Hoboken, New Jersey, and lived in Maplewood, New Jersey, and had a son, William Lowell Jr. (1897–1976). He initially made 5,000 tees, that were stained green, but he soon changed to red, to make them more distinctive and named them "Reddy Tees". In 1922 Walter Hagen and Joe Kirkwood Sr. used his tees during their exhibitions. The Reddy Tee was patented on May 13, 1925, but in 1922 he signed a deal with the A.G. Spalding Company, for 24 dozen. By 1925 he was selling $100,000 worth of tees and they were being made of celluloid. By 1926 copycat versions were on the market, and he spent much of his time and money fighting patent infringement.

He died at Orange Memorial Hospital in East Orange, New Jersey, on June 24, 1954, at the age of 91.

== Patents ==
Patents
Patent drawing of a golf tee from a United States patent filed in 1925. Showing six figures. Figures 1 and 3 are the tee itself; the shape is a small wooden peg with a concave, funnel-shaped top to hold the golf ball up. Figures 5 and 6 show a golf ball being placed on the tee.	U.S. patent 1,670,627 golf tee filed December 7, 1925
	U.S. patent 1,650,141 golf tee filed August 26, 1925
	U.S. patent 1,569,765 golf putter filed November 13, 1925

== See also ==
- George Franklin Grant, the first golf tee inventor.
