= The Lowell =

Historic house in Massachusetts, United States

- U.S. National Register of Historic Places
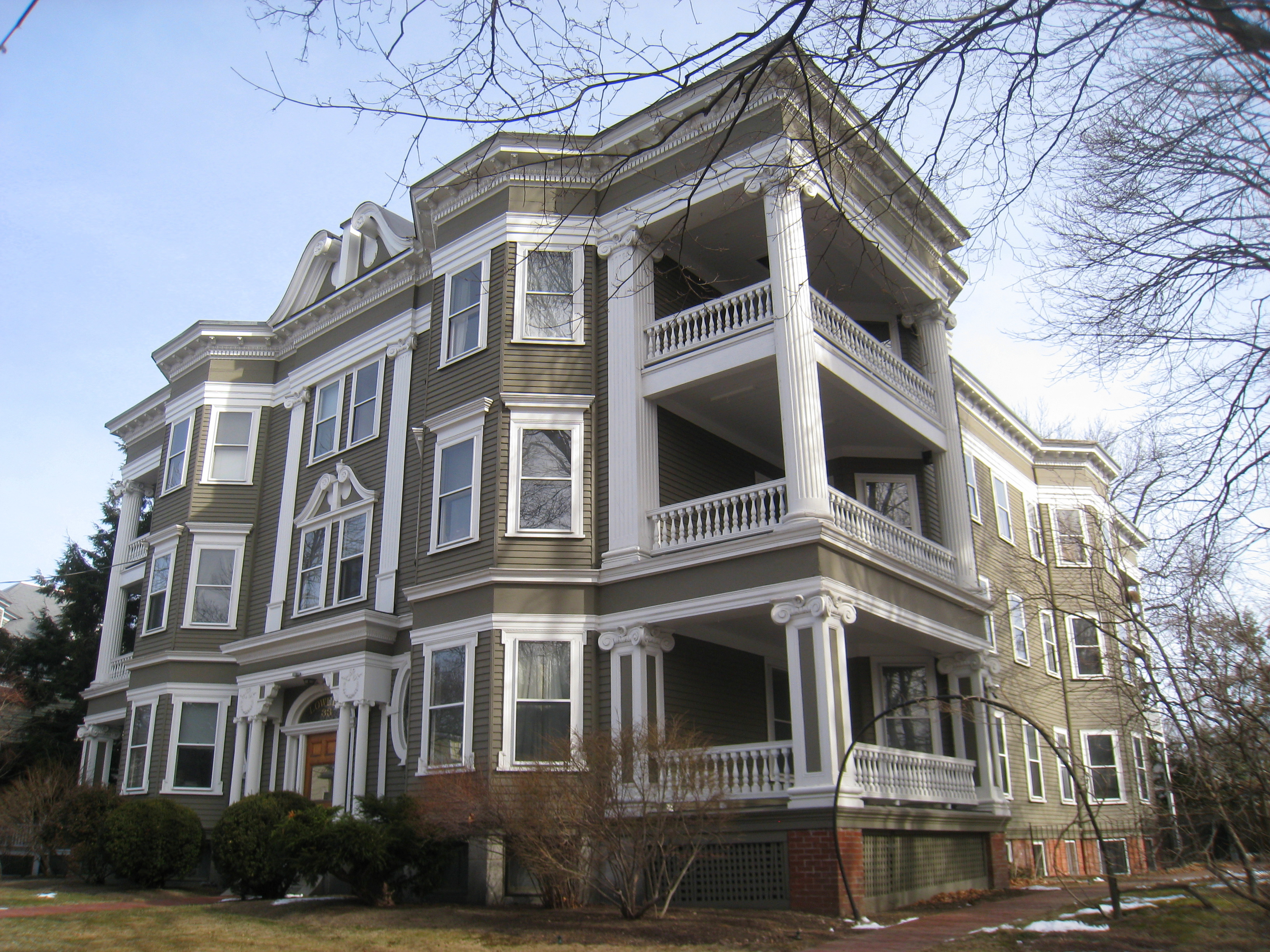

- Location within Massachusetts Location within the United States
- Location: Cambridge, Massachusetts
- Coordinates: 42°22′37.8″N 71°08′22.9″W
- Built: 1900
- Architect: Hasty, John A.
- Architectural style: Colonial Revival
- MPS: Cambridge MRA
- NRHP reference No.: 83000815
- Added to NRHP: June 30, 1983

The Lowell is an historic triple decker apartment house on 33 Lexington Avenue in Cambridge, Massachusetts. Built in 1900 to a design by local architect John Hasty, it is a rare multiunit building in the Brattle Street area outside Harvard Square. The Colonial Revival building has a swan's neck pediment above the center entry, which is echoed above the central second story windows. Doric pilasters separate the bays of the front facade, and the building distinctively has side porches, giving it added horizontal massing. It was built before the decision was made to locate the electrified trolleys on Mount Auburn Street instead of Brattle (under pressure from wealthy Brattle Street residents), a decision that reduced interest in building more multiunit housing in that area.

The building was listed on the National Register of Historic Places in 1983.

== See also ==
- National Register of Historic Places listings in Cambridge, Massachusetts
