= Lowell Township =

Lowell Township may refer to:

- Lowell Township, Cherokee County, Kansas
- Lowell Township, Michigan
- Lowell Township, Polk County, Minnesota
- Lowell Township, Kearney County, Nebraska
- Lowell Township, Marshall County, South Dakota, in Marshall County, South Dakota
