= Queens Museum =

Art museum in New York City

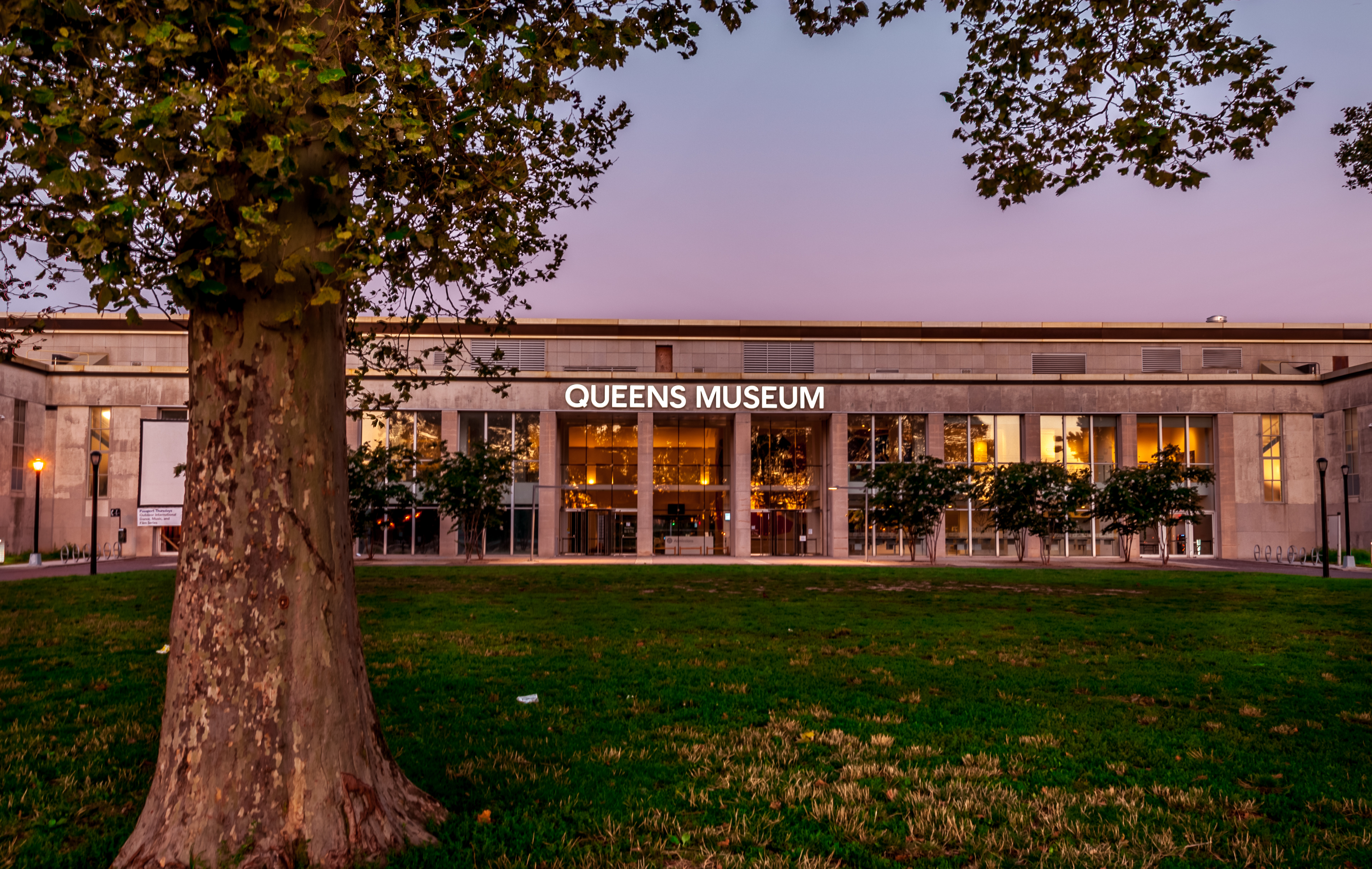
- Established: 1972
- Location: Flushing Meadows–Corona Park, Queens, New York 11368
- Coordinates: 40°44′45″N 73°50′48″W
- Type: Art museum
- Director: Debra Wimpfheimer
- Public transit access: Subway: to Mets–Willets Point or 111th Street; Bus: Q23, Q58
- Website: www.queensmuseum.org

The Queens Museum (formerly the Queens Museum of Art) is an art museum and educational center at Flushing Meadows–Corona Park in Queens, New York City, United States. Established in 1972, the museum includes the Panorama of the City of New York, a room-sized scale model of the five boroughs of New York City built for the 1964 New York World's Fair. Its collection includes a large archive of artifacts from both the 1939 and 1964 World's Fairs, a selection of which is on display. As of 2026, Queens Museum's director is Debra Wimpfheimer.

The museum's building was constructed for the 1939 New York World's Fair as the New York City Pavilion. The structure was used as an ice-skating and roller-skating rink during the 1940s and 1950s, except when it housed the United Nations General Assembly from 1946 to 1951. The building also served as the New York City Pavilion for the 1964 World's Fair and was preserved following the fair. The museum opened in the northern part of the building in November 1972. The museum was renovated in the late 1970s, during which a community gallery was added; another renovation in the 1990s added an entrance from the east. The museum was expanded significantly in the 2010s, during which the ice rink was closed. Another expansion was announced in the 2020s.

== History ==
=== Early building use ===
==== 1939 World's Fair ====
The Queens Museum is located in the New York City Pavilion at Flushing Meadows–Corona Park, designed by architect Aymar Embury II for the 1939 World's Fair. The fair was first announced in 1935, and engineering consultant J. Franklin Bell drew up preliminary plans for the fairground the next year, including a structure for the New York City government. The building was originally proposed as a two-story "glass house", but it was ultimately erected as a more conventional rectangular building. Mayor Fiorello La Guardia said he wanted the building to showcase "modern municipal government in all its aspects". In April 1937, the New York City Board of Estimate approved the sale of $180,000 in bonds to fund the construction of the City Building's foundation. That August, Psaty & Fuhrman submitted a low bid of $556,000 for the building's construction. The building's ceremonial cornerstone was laid in January 1938, and the facade was completed by the beginning of May. La Guardia used the building as his "summer City Hall" during mid-1938, and his office there was fitted with temporary mechanical equipment while other parts of the building were being completed.

The New York City Pavilion ultimately cost $1.645 million. The pavilion was the second-largest structure at the fair, after the United States pavilion, and it was intended as a permanent structure for the outset, in contrast to nearly all the other structures, which would have been demolished. Next to the building was a plaza named City Hall Square, which separated it from the Trylon and Perisphere, the central monument of the 1939 fair. Around it was a spiral hedge ranging from 1 to 20 feet (0.30 to 6.10 m) tall, as well as English boxwood trimmed in the shape of the fair's seal. Malvina Hoffman designed a bas-relief called Dances of the Races to the east of the building, while William Zorach designed the sculptural group Builders of the Future to the west. Inside the pavilion were dioramas, murals, models, and displays about various departments of the city government. The pavilion included exhibits on such topics as the WNYC radio station, the city's courts, and the Independent Subway System, along with stage shows and a voting demonstration. There were a total of 63 exhibits, as well as an auditorium.

La Guardia dedicated the building when the fair opened on April 30, 1939. The fair ran for two 6-month seasons until October 26, 1940. A special edition of New York Advancing, a book about the city government, was published in celebration of the fair's opening. The special edition included an official guide to the New York City Pavilion. After the end of the fair's first season in November 1939, the space east of the building was converted to a concert area, and furniture was stored in the pavilion prior to the 1940 season. A memorial plaque was installed on the New York City Pavilion after two policemen were killed in 1940 while attempting to defuse a bomb nearby.

==== United Nations and skating rink ====
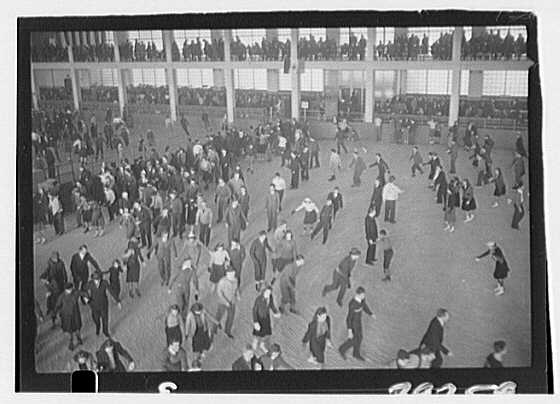
The rink

The New York City Building was one of seven structures at Flushing Meadows to be preserved following the 1939 fair. (Note: The other six were the Aquacade amphitheater, B.F. Goodrich pavilion, House of Jewels, Masterpieces of Art building, Japanese pavilion, and Polish pavilion's tower.) Within days of the fair's closure in October 1940, the New York City Department of Parks and Recreation had requested $25,000 from the New York City Board of Estimate to convert the building to an ice rink. The building was divided into a roller skating rink to the north and an ice-skating rink to the south. The roller rink measured 150 by 120 feet (46 by 37 m), while the ice rink measured 168 by 120 feet (51 by 37 m) and could be used for other sports such as basketball and tennis. The rinks opened on January 12, 1941, as the park's first sporting facility. Skaters had to pay an admission fee, and spectators were also charged a fee after late 1941. The rinks recorded 150,000 total visitors in their first three months and 1.4 million total visitors in five years.

The United Nations was planning a permanent headquarters during the 1940s. While the organization was deciding on a permanent headquarters, UN Secretary-General Trygve Lie decided in April 1946 to use the New York City Pavilion as a meeting hall for the United Nations General Assembly. The city and UN agreed to spend $2.27 million to renovate the pavilion and environs, and workers began renovations in May 1946. A wall was built between the northern and southern halves of the building, and an auditorium and small annex was built in the northern half. The southern half was converted to space for air conditioning equipment. Workers also planted a flower garden at the site of the Trylon and Perisphere, in addition to 1,000 trees, 2,500 shrubs, and 200,000 other plants around the building. In addition, nearby roads were upgraded. Early plans called for the General Assembly to use the building for only six months; the building would have continued to function as a roller-skating and ice-skating rink afterward.

Once the renovations were completed, the UN took over the building that September, and a formal ceremony was hosted on October 18, 1946. Later that year, the UN decided to build its permanent headquarters in Manhattan, and the UN was allowed to stay at the New York City Pavilion until the Manhattan headquarters was finished. Numerous significant events occurred at the New York City Pavilion in the UN's early years, including the creation of UNICEF, the partition of Korea, and the authorization of the United Nations Partition Plan for Palestine (during which Israel was created). The UN renewed its lease of the building in late 1947. The pavilion was the temporary home of the General Assembly until October 20, 1951, and the General Assembly met in Manhattan afterward.

After the UN vacated the space, contractors converted the building back into a rink as part of a $237,000 renovation. A 116-by-150-foot (35 by 46 m) wooden roller-skating rink and a 116-by-178-foot (35 by 54 m) ice rink were added, and ramps and public announcement systems were also installed. The rink reopened on October 18, 1952, and was renovated again in mid-1953. To celebrate the New York City Pavilion's usage as a temporary General Assembly hall, the building was depicted in a stamp released by the United Nations in 1958. By the 1960s, it was one of two major structures in Flushing Meadows Park that remained from the 1939 fair, the other being Billy Rose's Aquacade.

==== 1964 World's Fair ====
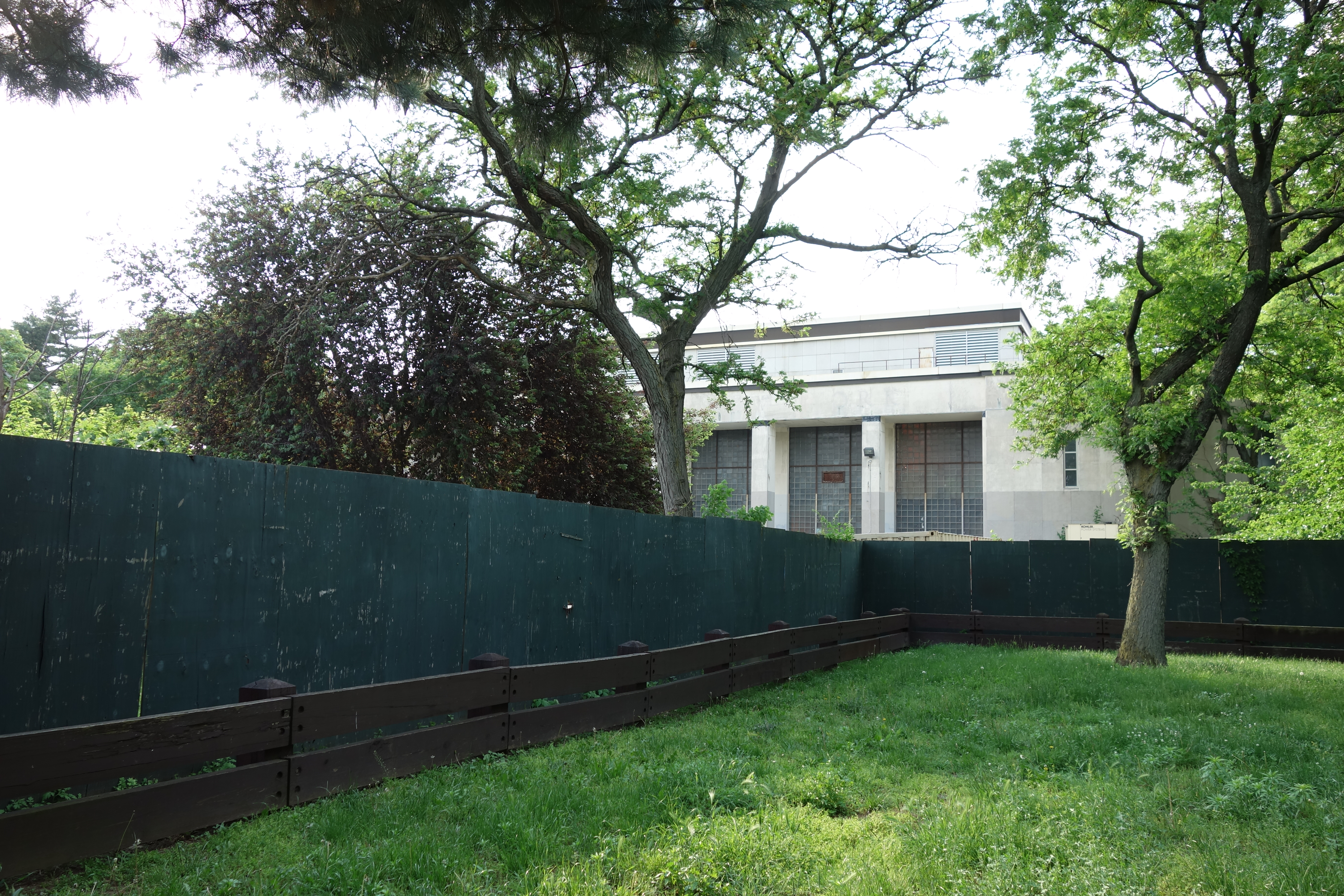
The eastern facade of the New York City Building

The Flushing Meadows site was selected in 1959 for the 1964 New York World's Fair. Gilmore David Clarke and Michael Rapuano, who had redesigned the park for the 1939 World's Fair, were retained to tailor the park layout for the new fair. New York City parks commissioner Robert Moses was appointed as president of the World's Fair Corporation, which was to operate the fair. Moses decided to reuse the New York City Building as the city's exhibition space during the 1964 World's Fair. Almost all of Flushing Meadows–Corona Park was closed in early 1961 in advance of the fair, except for the New York City Building's ice skating rink. In June 1961, the New York City Board of Estimate awarded a contract for the construction of the Panorama of the City of New York, a scale model of New York City within the City Building. The city government announced in 1962 that it would spend $832,500 to renovate the building's skating rink. The architect Daniel Chait was hired to renovate the City Building. Moses requested $1.066 million for the building's renovation in June 1962, and the Board of Estimate ultimately approved $2 million in funding. In mid-1963, two figure-skating companies were selected to perform at the City Building as part of a show called Dick Button's Ice-Travaganza.

The New York City Building was formally rededicated on April 25, 1964, two days after the 1964 World's Fair opened. Tickets to the ice-skating show ranged from $1 to $2, while tickets for simulated helicopter rides above the Panorama cost 10 cents apiece. The main attraction in the building was the Panorama of the City of New York, which had cost the city $600,000 and taken two years to construct. The building's ice rink was equipped with a ski run, in addition to six movable stages and 12 stationary stages. Memorabilia and artworks from 34 museums were displayed inside the building to celebrate the 300th anniversary of the British conquest of New Netherland, and a film displayed the history of the Triborough Bridge and Tunnel Authority (TBTA). Radio station WNYC also moved much of its broadcasting operations to the City Building during the 1964 World's Fair. A replica of a New York City Police Department precinct was added to the building.

During the 1964 season, there were rarely any queues to get inside the City Building. The Panorama was initially relatively unpopular with visitors, but it ultimately recorded an average of 1,400 visitors a day. Dick Button's Ice-Travaganza was also unsuccessful, despite the building's central location within the World's Fair grounds. The New York City Building operated until the end of the 1964 World's Fair in October 1965. From the outset, Moses planned to preserve the New York City Building after the 1964 World's Fair, and the World's Fair Corporation set aside funding for the building's renovation at the end of the fair. The initial plans called for the Panorama to be moved from the building to the Civic Center of Manhattan, allowing the City Building to be used as a skating rink. Moses subsequently offered to have the TBTA take responsibility for the Panorama. The City Building was one of the few buildings to remain from the 1964 fair, along with the Unisphere, Singer Bowl, New York State and U.S. pavilions, and the Hall of Science. The structure was used by the TBTA in the 1960s, and the city government took over the surrounding park in 1967.

=== Late 20th century ===
==== Creation of museum ====
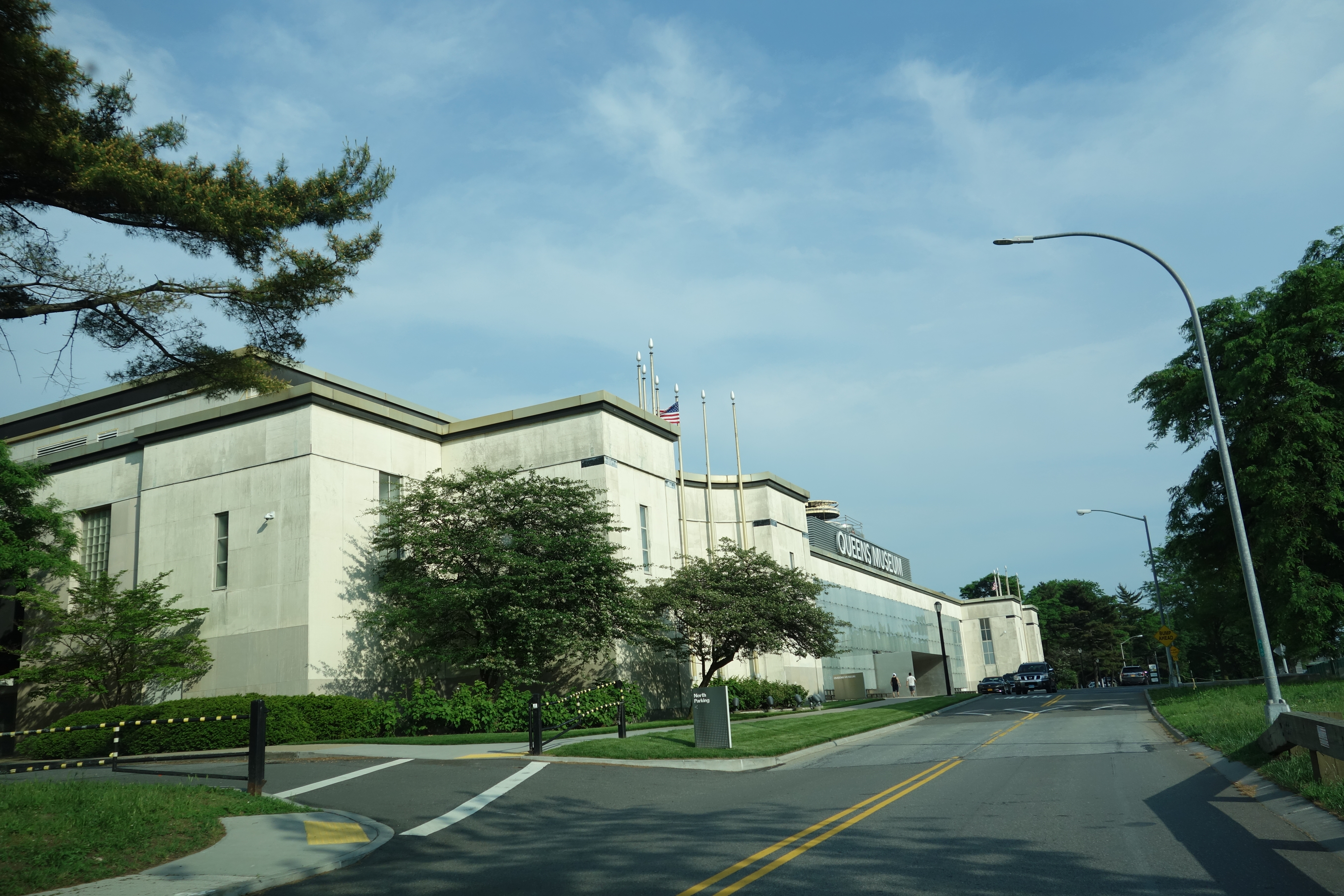
Seen from the north

After the TBTA moved out of the New York City Pavilion, city parks commissioner August Heckscher II announced in November 1971 that part of the New York City Pavilion would be converted into Queens's first art museum. Heckscher organized a board of 14 trustees, and the city government provided $100,000 for the museum. During mid-1972, the mechanical systems for the building's skating rink were refurbished, and part of the building was renovated to accommodate the museum. A local group, the Flushing Meadows Corona Park World's Fair Association, also asked the New York City Landmarks Preservation Commission to conduct a historical study of the New York City Pavilion. Queens borough president Donald Manes announced in July 1972 that the Queens County Art and Cultural Center had been established at the New York City Pavilion. The museum opened on November 12, 1972, with Clare Fisher as the museum's first director. The writer Lawrence R. Samuel wrote that the building's conversion into a museum helped to raise Flushing Meadows Park's profile, and The New York Times described the museum as "a primary force in [the] renaissance of the arts" in Queens.

Originally, the Queens County Art and Cultural Center occupied 50,000 square feet (4,600 m^{2}), and two-fifths of the museum's space was taken up by the Panorama. There was only about 10,000 square feet (930 m^{2}) of actual display space, which meant that the museum had to close every time a temporary exhibit was being added or replaced. The museum had four to five school groups per day, though nearly as many school groups had to be denied admission to the lack of space. The museum's main entrance was at the northern end of the New York City Pavilion building, while the ice-skating rink occupied the structure's southern half. The museum's collection also had no clear focus; according to a 1991 New York Times article, many visitors assumed the Queens Museum was a history museum or knew only about its Panorama. Shortly after the museum opened, the city allocated $140,000 for additional upgrades to the New York City Pavilion, which was later increased to $317,000. The ice-skating rink continued to operate five days a week.

==== Mid-1970s to 1980s ====
The Queens County Art and Cultural Center changed its name to the Queens Museum in late 1973. The board of trustees fired Fisher as the museum director that year, following disagreements over policy. Kenneth Kahn was hired to replace Fisher in 1974. The museum's eight employees subsequently expressed dissatisfaction with the lack of personnel guidance from the board of trustees, and the staff sought to restructure the museum. Kahn alleged in early 1975 that the trustees were "a closed corporation, representing a narrow spectrum of the community". The Friends of the Queens Museum, a volunteer group for the museum, suspended its operations to protest the trustees' actions. The museum's board of trustees fired Kahn in February 1975, along with the museum's administrator Betty Miller the next month. Several trustees also resigned, and the museum's staff took over the museum's gift shop from the Friends group. Kahn later sued several trustees, claiming that they had broken a contract and slandered him.

Thomas Hoving, the Metropolitan Museum of Art's director, was hired as the museum's interim director in March 1975, and the dissent surrounding the museum subsided. Blanche Taub, the leader of the Friends, was also elected to the museum's board of trustees, and the board itself was replaced shortly thereafter. Amid the 1975 New York City fiscal crisis, the city reneged on a $350,000 grant that it had offered to the museum's staff for a renovation of the building. It took more than two years before a permanent director was hired. Janet Schneider was hired as the museum's executive director in February 1978. Geraldine Eiber, who was appointed the same year as the museum's president, wanted to increase public awareness of the museum, in addition to obtaining new art and corporate sponsorships. The New York City Council provided more than $500,000 for an expansion of the Queens Museum shortly afterward, which would add over 20,000 square feet (1,900 m^{2}) of exhibition space. The Queens Museum's Community Gallery opened in September 1979 as an exhibit space for the local community. The Queens Museum also began visiting local groups in an attempt to increase residents' involvement with the museum.

The museum continued to expand its space within the New York City Pavilion through the 1980s. By 1982, the New York Daily News reported that the museum's gallery, studios, workshops, office, and backroom spaces took up nearly half the building. The Queens Museum began developing a sculpture hall in 1983, when Chase Manhattan Bank gave the museum $150,000 to fund the acquisition of casts from the Metropolitan Museum of Art's collection. Ultimately, the Queens Museum loaned 40 casts permanently, and the sculpture hall opened in 1986 with 22 casts. The museum also considered restoring the Panorama and adding moving walkways to that exhibit. Schneider resigned in 1989 after twelve years as the museum's director; by then, the museum was planning a $14 million expansion. Steven Klindt was hired as the new director later that year. By then, the museum had 100,000 annual visitors (many times higher than in the 1970s), though membership was less than projected, with 1,200 members. Furthermore, many visitors were either part of school groups or came specifically to see the Panorama.

==== 1990s ====
In the early 1990s, the museum received $13.5 million from the city government for a renovation of the New York City Pavilion. Despite citywide budget cuts, the museum was able to keep most of its programs intact, though it did have to fire some staff. Queens Museum officials began renovating the museum building in June 1991, and the museum's name was lengthened from "Queens Museum" to "Queens Museum of Art". The architect Rafael Viñoly reconfigured the structure into galleries, classrooms, and offices. A new entrance and galleries were built to the east, facing the Unisphere, and a 117-seat auditorium was also built. In addition, a ramp was constructed between the upper and lower levels of the museum. The Panorama, the museum's sole permanent exhibit, was removed so workers could update it. Museum workers had finished renovating the facade by 1992.

During the renovation, the museum recorded fewer visitors, in part because the Panorama was temporarily removed and because the existing exhibits did not appeal to Queens's increasingly ethnically diverse population. The museum also began looking to hire an executive to help raise funds, and Carma C. Fauntleroy was hired as the museum's executive director in 1993. In addition, museum executives began meeting with Queens community groups, as the museum wanted to host more shows that signified Queens's cultural diversity. The renovation was completed in November 1994 with double the amount of gallery space. Fauntleroy said the new galleries would allow the museum to display more visual art. The renovation ultimately cost $15 million. In the long term, the museum also wanted to expand into the space occupied by the ice rink.

By the late 1990s, Queens borough president Claire Shulman was considering replacing the New York City Pavilion's ice rink with a new rink at Cunningham Park in eastern Queens. The relocation would allow the Queens Museum to expand even further, though the proposal was controversial. At the time, the ice rink was deteriorating, and the New York City Department of Parks and Recreation preferred to demolish the rink rather than repair it. Laurene Buckley took over as the museum's executive director in July 1999, with plans to expand the permanent collection and attract more visitors. That November, she initiated the First Thursdays program, in which the museum hosted events and activities one Thursday a month.

=== 21st century ===
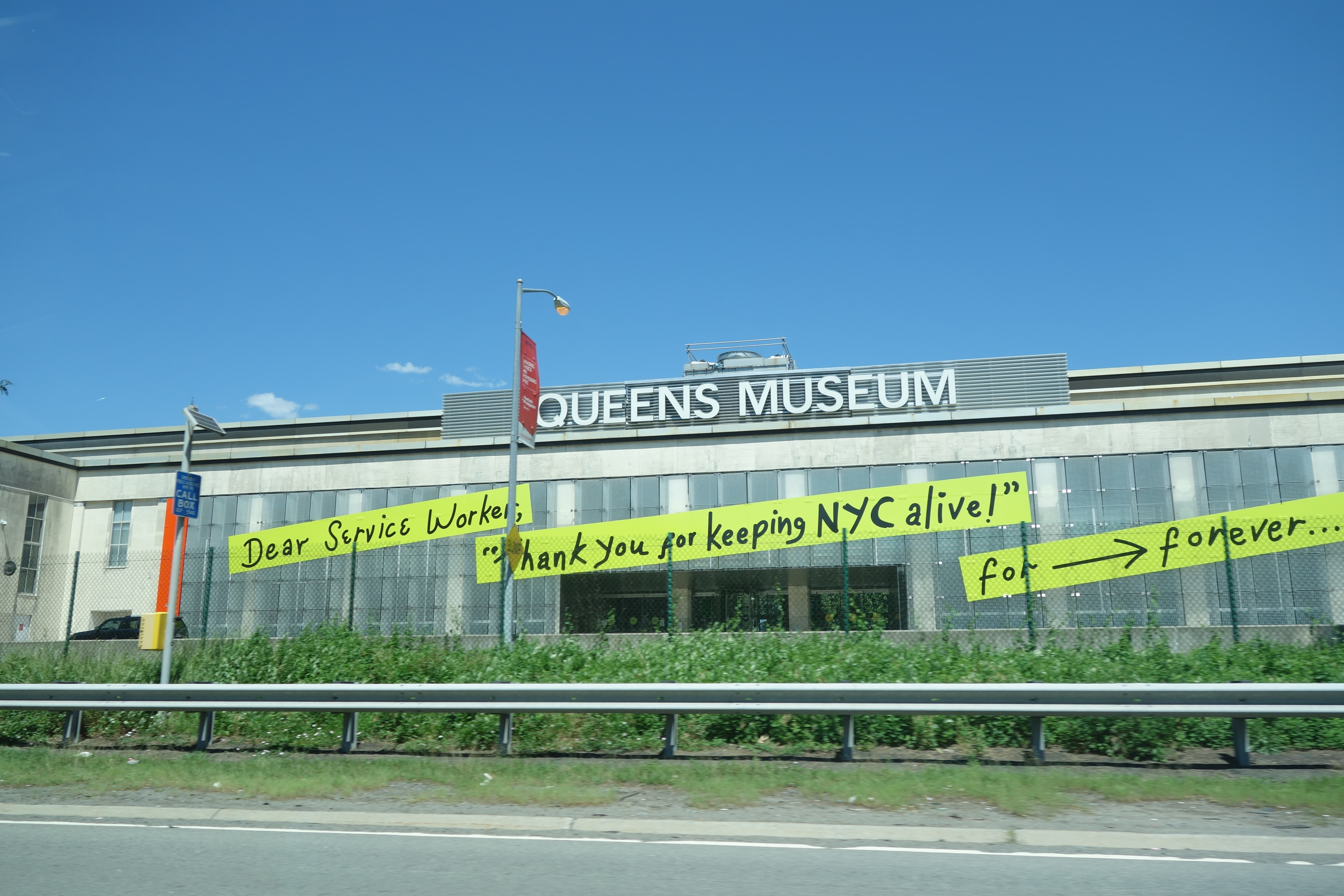
The museum's rebuilt western facade

==== 2000s and early 2010s ====
In 2001, the New York City Department of Design and Construction hosted an architectural design competition for a proposed renovation of the Queens Museum building. The museum hired Eric Owen Moss to design the expansion that December. The plans called for the relocation of the ice skating rink, as well as a new bent-glass roof, an exhibition space at the center of the structure, and a dirt mound facing Grand Central Parkway to the west. This would have doubled the museum's space and allowed it to accommodate more art exhibitions and programs. The city government also promised $22.5 million toward the museum's expansion, but the museum needed to raise another $15 million. Architectural critics derided Moss's plans, and preservationists described it as being incongruous with the building's original design; museum officials then voted to scale down Moss's plans. NYC Parks began building another ice rink nearby in 2002 to replace the New York City Pavilion's rink, but work on the new rink was delayed later that year due to funding shortages. The next year, city officials said they could not provide funds for the museum's expansion until 2006.

Tom Finkelpearl was hired as the museum's director in early 2002. Finkelpearl said at the time that many visitors to Flushing Meadows Corona Park continued to ignore the museum because the building looked "like it's closed, even when we're open". He was advocating for changes to the museum's renovation plans by late 2004, saying that Moss's plan "wasn't jelling from a practical perspective". Accordingly, the museum abandoned Moss's plan in early 2005. The museum solicited a new proposal from Grimshaw Architects, which agreed to work with local engineering firm Ammann & Whitney. Queens borough president Helen Marshall gave the museum a $10.6 million grant for the expansion in March 2006, which at the time was the largest gift the museum had ever received. Grimshaw presented revised designs for the expansion that October. The revised plans called for new facades to the west and east, as well as a skylit interior courtyard. At the time, the renovation was supposed to cost $37 million of which $21 million came from Marshall's office.

The museum began an expansion project in 2009. Grimshaw Architects and Ammann & Whitney developed plans for 50,000 square feet (4,600 m^{2}) of exhibition, education, and office space, as well as eight new artist studios. The new space would be created on the site of the old ice skating rink. The ice rink was relocated to a new facility in the northeastern section of Flushing Meadows–Corona Park. and the interior of the ice rink was demolished by the beginning of 2010. The project ultimately ended up costing $69 million. The expanded museum reopened in November 2013 with a new entrance at Grand Central Parkway. After it reopened, the museum shortened its name to Queens Museum.

==== Mid-2010s to present ====
Attractions and geographical features of Flushing Meadows–Corona Park
Attractions and geographical features of Flushing Meadows–Corona Park:
1 Citi Field
2 Etihad Park (under construction)
3 Flushing Meadows Carousel and Queens Zoo
4 Flushing Meadows Corona Park Aquatics Center
5 Flushing River and Creek
6 Meadow Lake and Hong Kong Dragon Boat Festival
7 Metropolitan Park (planned) and Shea Stadium (demolished)
8 Mets–Willets Point subway station
9 Mets–Willets Point LIRR station
10 National Tennis Center and United States Pavilion (demolished)
11 New York Hall of Science
12 New York State Pavilion and Queens Theatre
13 Queens Botanical Garden
14 Queens Museum
15 Queens Night Market
16 Terrace on the Park
17 Unisphere
18 Willow Lake
19 World's Fair subway station (demolished)

Finkelpearl resigned in 2014 when he was hired as commissioner of the New York City Department of Cultural Affairs. Subsequently, the Queens Museum appointed Laura Raicovich as its director that October. The New York Times wrote that Raicovich became involved in political activism, had contrasted with the museum directors, who tended to be politically uninvolved. During the first inauguration of Donald Trump as U.S. president in January 2017, the museum closed temporarily in conjunction with a protest hosted by artists, and began hosting events nearby. That year, the museum controversially canceled an agreement to rent space for a party celebrating the 70th anniversary of the Israeli Declaration of Independence. The event was ultimately reinstated at the museum, and the board commissioned an investigation into misbehaviors by Raicovich and deputy director David Strauss. Raicovich resigned in January 2018, and Strauss was fired. Raicovich said her actions were intended to make the museum more attractive to Queens's diverse population.

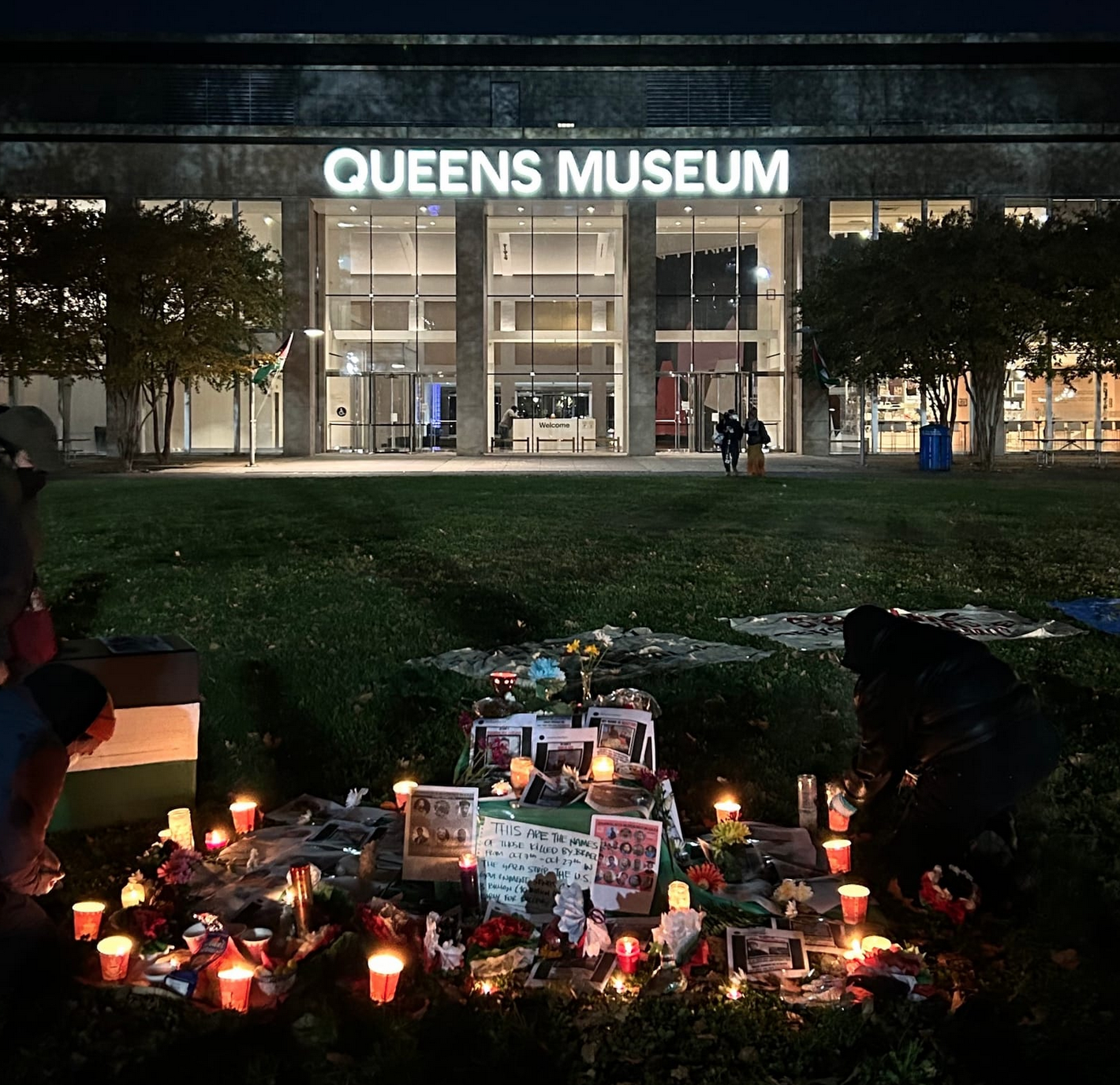
A 2023 protest outside the museum

The British curator Sally Tallant was hired as the museum's new director in late 2018. The Queens Museum was closed temporarily from March to September 2020 due to the COVID-19 pandemic in New York City. The city government gave the museum $26.4 million in September 2021 to complete the second phase of its expansion. In mid-2022, the museum hired Levenbetts to design the renovation, which museum officials predicted would cost $69 million. The project would create a children's museum wing; add 2,600 square feet (240 m^{2}) of storage space; build a 5,500-square-foot (510 m^{2}) art lab; and add classrooms, conservation, and exhibit preparation spaces. The project was to involve repairing the south facade as well. The city allocated another $8.5 million for the children's museum space in August 2023, and the state provided $8.5 million in July 2025. The annex was renamed the Suna Children's Museum to honor museum trustee Alan Suna.

In May 2023, Hyperallergic reported that artists had accused Tallant of failing to take action on racial, economic and gender-based justice, including failing to act on a complaint of harassment. Other criticisms included reports that Tallant had authorized the repurposing of an art installation by Xaviera Simmons without the artist's permission, as a protest on Tallant's and the museum's stance on the Israeli–Palestinian conflict and Palestine's history. Some staff, who worked on a pro-Palestinian statement, reported feeling "heightened surveillance" and "intimidation" under Tallant’s tenure. Tallant resigned in January 2026 to work for London's Hayward Gallery and was replaced the next month by Debra Wimpfheimer.

== Building ==
The museum building, originally the New York City Pavilion, covers 105,000 square feet (9,800 m^{2}) following the 2013 renovation. As constructed, the building measured 360 by 120 feet (110 by 37 m) across, with a ceiling 40 feet (12 m) high. The building includes exhibit spaces, event spaces, artists' studios, a cafe, and an atrium. The structure is one of five buildings that survive from the 1939 World's Fair. The other structures include a boathouse and an administration building in Flushing Meadows–Corona Park; the Parachute Jump on Coney Island; and the Belgian Building at Virginia Union University in Richmond, Virginia. It is also one of several 1964 World's Fair structures that remain in the park, along with the New York Hall of Science, the New York State Pavilion, Terrace on the Park, and the Unisphere.

The exterior is primarily made of concrete. When the New York City Pavilion was built, it had rectangular pillars, glass-block walls, and a geometric cornice. In advance of the 1964 fair, the glass blocks were covered up, and the cornice was removed. Prior to the 2013 renovation, the building had no main entrance; thus, many visitors to Flushing Meadows–Corona Park did not know of the museum's existence. After the 2013 renovation, there is a 200-foot-wide (61 m), 27-foot-tall (8.2 m) glass wall on the western facade of the museum building. The glass facade consists of fritted glass panels interspersed with aluminum panels. At night, the facade is illuminated by LED lights that are visible from Grand Central Parkway immediately to the west. The eastern end of the building has a set of revolving doors embedded within a 30-foot-tall (9.1 m) curtain wall, which in turn is recessed behind a colonnade.

== Collections and exhibits ==
=== Permanent collection ===
The museum's permanent collection includes 10,000 items related to the 1939 and 1964 World's Fairs. As of 2013, about 900 World's Fair objects are on permanent display. Acquisitions over the years have included works by Salvador Dalí and Mark Dion.

==== Panorama of the City of New York ====
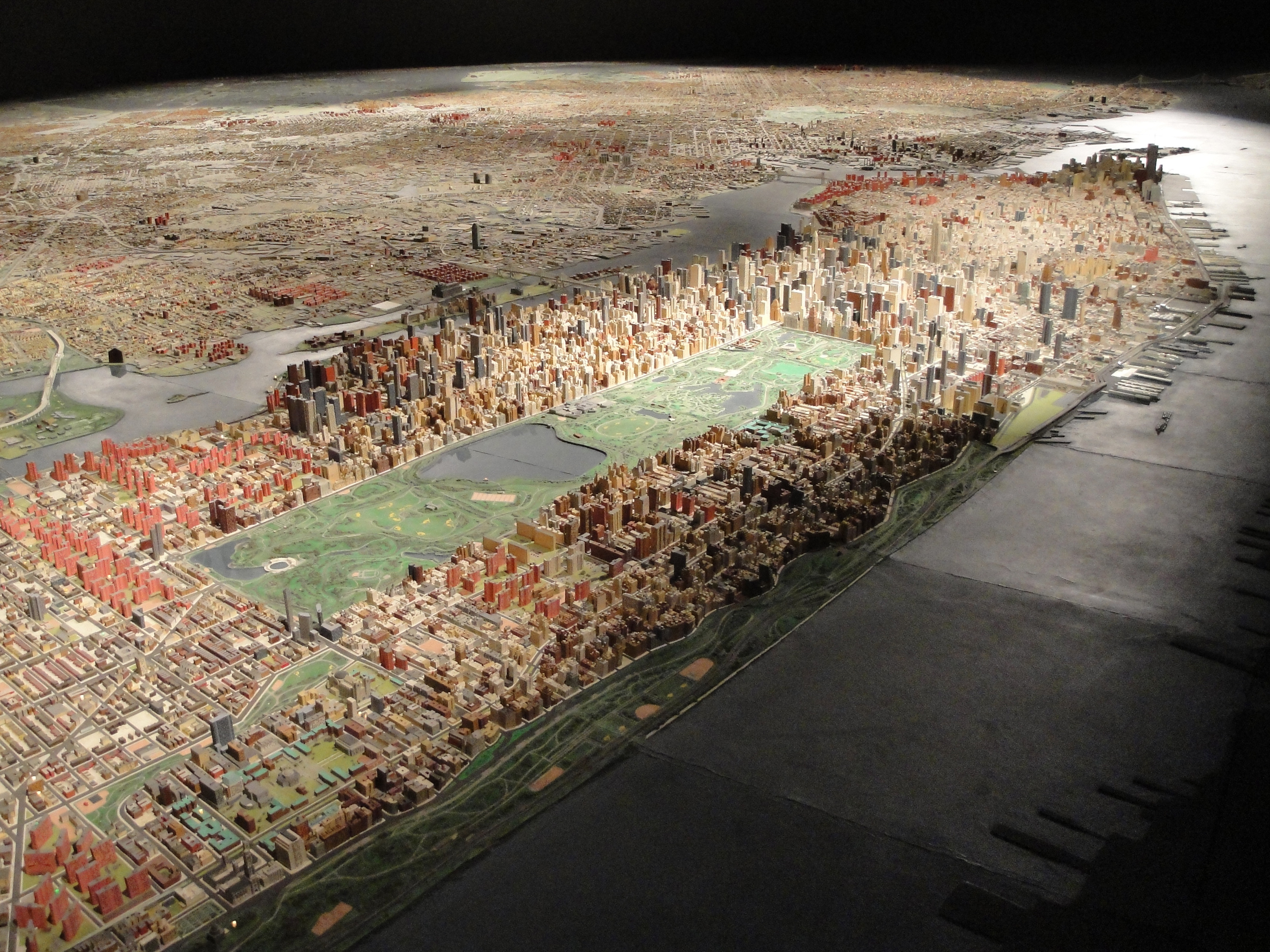
The repeatedly updated Panorama of the City of New York, as it appeared in 2011

The largest permanent exhibition at the Queens Museum is the Panorama of the City of New York, which was constructed by Lester Associates for the 1964 World's Fair. A celebration of the city's municipal infrastructure, this 9,335-square-foot (867.2 m^{2}) architectural model includes almost every building that existed in all five boroughs in 1992, at a 1:1200 scale. One hundred employees from Raymond Lester Associates built the model in three years. The model is made of 273 panels. The panorama depicts 895,000 individual structures, which are made of plastic or wood. All of the bridges are made of brass. The panel depicting the Far Rockaway neighborhood was not originally installed due to space limitations; in 1987, the Far Rockaway panel was installed in its own room.

After the Fair closed, the Panorama remained open to the public, and Lester's team updated the map in 1967, 1968, and 1969. After 1970, very few changes were made until 1992, when again Lester Associates was hired to update the model, adding over 60,000 structures. In March 2009, the museum announced that it would allow people to donate at least $50 to have accurate scale models created and added. The mechanical "helicopter" vehicles for conveying exhibition visitors were showing signs of wear, and were removed before the 1994 reopening. The Panorama has also hosted temporary exhibits, such as models of unbuilt structures in the 2018 exhibit Never Built New York.

The current installation, dating to a 1990s renovation of the museum by Rafael Viñoly, features accessible ramps and an elevated glass floored walkway which surround the Panorama. Since 2023, the museum has also allowed visitors a closeup look at individual structures in the Panorama, via an electronic kiosk display.

==== Relief Map of the New York City Water Supply System ====
The museum also displays the Relief Map of the New York City Water Supply System, which measures 18 by 30 feet (5.5 by 9.1 m) across, with a total area of 540 square feet (50 m^{2}). The map is a scale model of the New York City water supply system and watershed. Tunnels and reservoirs are marked by lights that are placed across the map. The map is divided into 27 panels so it can be easily disassembled.

The Department of Water Supply, Gas and Electricity (a predecessor to the New York City Department of Environmental Protection) commissioned the Cartographic Survey Force of the Works Progress Administration to create the map for the 1939 World's Fair. Work began in 1938, with a budget of $100,000 (equivalent to $2,315,000 in 2025), but it was not displayed at the 1939 fair. The reason for this is variously attributed to World War II-era security concerns and the map's large area. The map was displayed at Grand Central Palace in 1948, the only time in the 20th century that it was publicly displayed. For the rest of the century, the map remained in storage and experienced dust and water damage. Museum officials announced in 2005 that they would install the map in the museum. The map was restored by the McKay Lodge Fine Arts Conservation Lab in Oberlin, Ohio, between 2006 and 2008, then displayed at the Queens Museum.

==== World's Fair Visual Storage and Gallery ====
Located on the second floor of the Queens Museum, this exhibit displays memorabilia from both the 1939 and 1964 World's Fairs. About 900 objects are displayed on-site. The online catalog contains over 10,000 items in total from both fairs.

=== Non-permanent collection ===
==== Neustadt Collection of Tiffany Glass ====
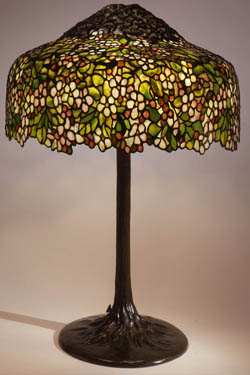
A lamp from the Tiffany collection

Since 1995, the museum has maintained a partnership with the Neustadt Collection of Tiffany Glass. Selections from the collection are on long-term display, drawn from a large private Tiffany collection assembled by Egon Neustadt and his wife Hildegard starting in the mid-1930s. The pieces originally went on display in 1997, after the museum's expansion was completed, and were intended to be exhibited for a decade. There are 440 pieces in the collection, most of which are kept in storage in Long Island City, Queens, and are not on public view. The history of the creation of Tiffany's artworks is featured in the Queens Museum exhibitions, as Tiffany Studios and Furnaces was once located in Corona, which were closed in the 1930s.

=== Temporary exhibits ===
The museum also stages temporary exhibits regularly. In its first decade, the museum staged eight to ten temporary exhibits annually. The museum's first-ever exhibition was a set of 19th-century landscapes from the Metropolitan Museum of Art. Starting in the 1970s, local artists' work was displayed at the museum every year, and there were two or three annual exhibitions of local artists' work. The topics of other exhibits in the 1970s included works by Joseph Cornell, animals in art, historical representations of cows, sports-themed art, the history of Queens, and items from the 1939 and 1964 fairs. During the 1980s, the topics of the museum's exhibits included American art films, 18th- and 19th-century European prints, Spanish gold artifacts, and the creation of the Panorama exhibit. By the end of that decade, the museum displayed about 15 exhibits a year.

The museum began hosting exhibits relating to Queens residents and ethnic groups in the 1990s. These included exhibits about Korean Americans and the musician Louis Armstrong. Exhibits in the first decade of the 21st century included a showcase of crime scene photographs from the Daily News' archives, a showcase of banners created by schoolchildren, a show about the diplomat Ralph Bunche, drawings from the court reporter William Sharp, and an exhibit of photographs of Robert Moses's work. During the 2010s, temporary exhibits included collections of World's Fair artifacts. When the museum reopened after the COVID-19 pandemic, it hosted exhibitions about the concept of home, the photographer Bruce Davidson, and children's art.

== Programs and outreach ==
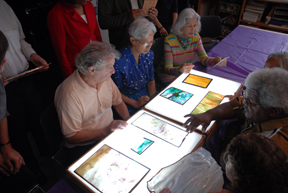
Seniors at an educational program

The Queens Museum has run numerous outreach programs for the surrounding community. In the 1970s, it offered a free art program for local youth. The museum also hosted Latin American cultural events and arts-education activities during the 1990s. When the museum building was closed during the COVID-19 pandemic, the Queens Museum organized a food pantry for residents of the surrounding neighborhood. The museum launched an activist program for teens, the Queens Teens Institute for Art and Social Justice, in 2023.

The Queens Museum has also been involved in community projects. These have included the restoration of Corona Plaza, a public plaza near the New York City Subway's 103rd Street–Corona Plaza station, in the early 21st century. Starting in 2004, the museum helped sponsor the Queens Culture Trolley, which traveled between Flushing Meadows and the neighborhoods of Corona and Jackson Heights.

== Operation ==
=== Management ===
The museum is operated by the Queens Museum of Art, which is classified as a 501(c)(3) organization since 1972. As of 2026, Queens Museum's director is Debra Wimpfheimer. In the 1970s, the Queens Museum was part of the Flushing Arts Council, a group of Flushing cultural institutions that also included Flushing Town Hall and Queens Botanical Garden.

=== Attendance and funding ===
The museum accommodated 60,000 or 100,000 annual visitors in the late 1980s and early 1990s. Roughly half of visitors came as part of school field trips. By the 2010s, the museum had 200,000 annual visitors; prior to the COVID-19 pandemic, the museum accommodated 30,000 students annually. In 2020, the Queens Museum made admission free for all visitors, and the museum instead operates on a pay what you want model.

When the museum opened, it sold annual memberships. Members received regular newsletters and bulletins, and the museum also hosted member-only events and exhibition previews. As of 2024, the Queens Museum sells four tiers of memberships, and the museum hosts member-only publications, events, and exhibition previews. The Queens Museum is also part of the Culture Pass program, whose members can enter for free.

In the 1970s, the museum's annual operating budget totaled $150,000, of which four-fifths came from the New York City government. The budget grew steadily during the 1970s and 1980s, reaching $2 million by 1989. During the 1990s, the museum had an operating budget of $1.8 million, and seven-tenths of the budget was funded by the city or other public sources. For the fiscal year ending on June 30, 2022, the Queens Museum recorded total revenue of $6.38 million, expenses of $6.59 million, assets of $36.6 million, and liabilities of $364,000.

== See also ==
- 1939 New York World's Fair pavilions and attractions
- 1964 New York World's Fair pavilions
- List of museums and cultural institutions in New York City
