= Waverly Lowell =

American archivist

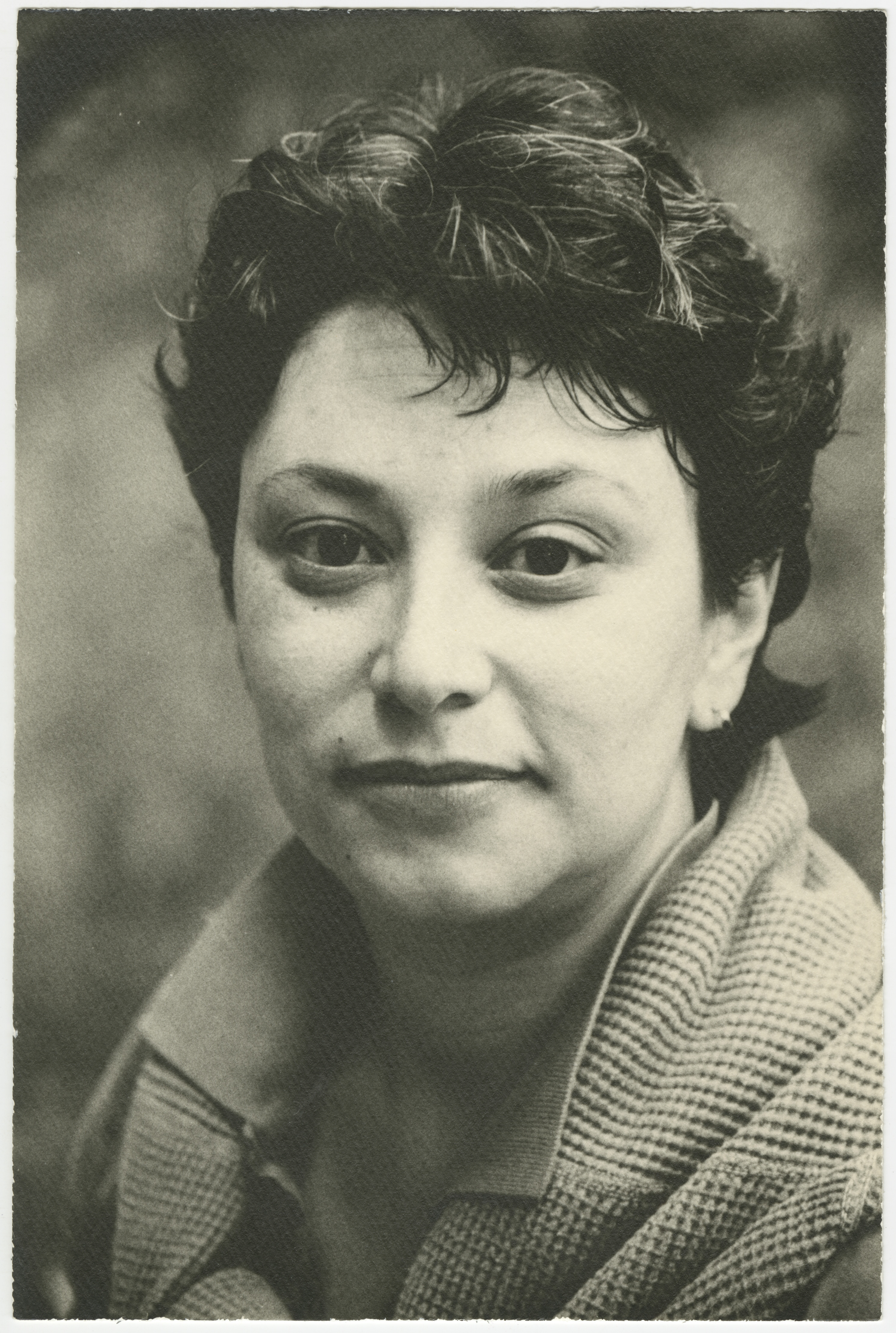
- Waverly Lowell, 1985 (photograph by Linda Long)
- Education: University of Rhode Island (BA); Rutgers University (MA); University of California, Berkeley (MLIS)
- Occupations: Archivist, Author, Architectural Historian

Waverly B. Lowell is an archivist who served as the curator of the Environmental Design Archives at the University of California, Berkeley from 1998-2018. Prior to her work at the archives, Lowell served as director of the National Archives - Pacific Sierra Region, curator of Manuscripts at the California Historical Society, curator of Historical Documents at the National Maritime Museum, director of the California Cooperative Preservation for Architectural Records Survey, and as an independent archival consultant.

Lowell's career at the Environmental Design Archives led efforts to document the designed environment created by practitioners in Northern California, and helped transform the documents collection into a national and international model for design archives. Her publications include Living Modern: A Biography of Greenwood Common.; Architectural Records: Managing Design & Construction Records; Architectural Records in the San Francisco Bay Area: A Guide to Research; Design on the Edge: A Century of Teaching Architecture at the University of California, Berkeley, 1903-2003; and Landscape at Berkeley: The First 100 Years, and Chinese Immigration and Chinese in the United States: Records in the Regional Archives of the National Archives and Records Administration, RIP 99, 1996.

During her career, Lowell was honored as a fellow of the Society of American Archivists, made a distinguished librarian by the Librarians Association of the University of California, Berkeley, received an AIASF Design Award for contributions made by the archives, and received the Archivists Award of Excellence from the California Heritage Preservation Commission among many other honors.

She has served as an adjunct instructor for the College of Environmental Design Architecture Department, UC Berkeley; an instructor for the Division of Library and Information Services, California State University, San Jose; an instructor at the John F. Kennedy University Center for Museum Studies; and as faculty for the Western Archives Institute for the Society of California Archivists.
