= Tee =

In sport, a stand for a stationary ball

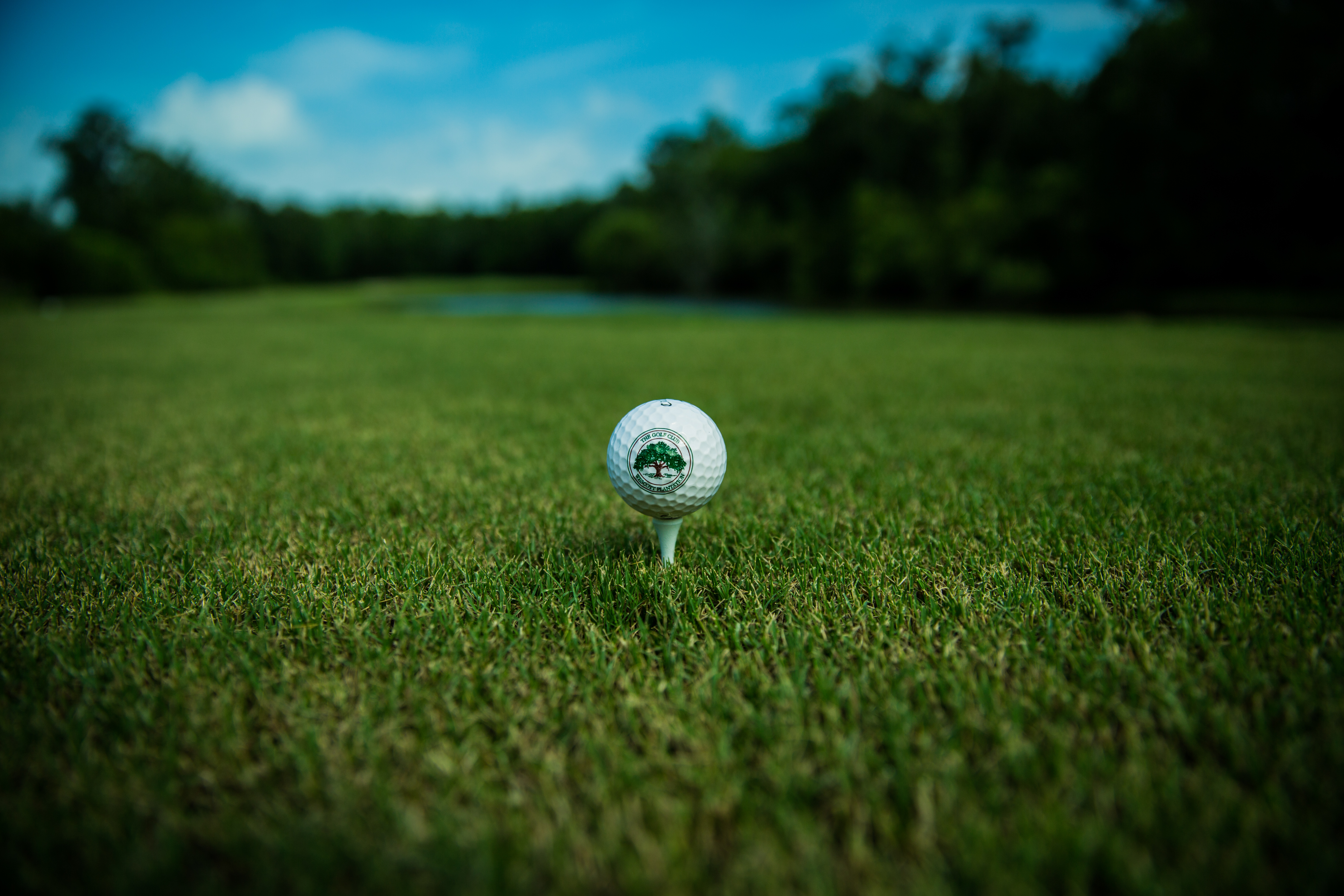
Golf ball on tee placed in the ground

A tee is a stand used in sport to support and elevate a stationary ball prior to striking with a foot, club, or bat. Tees are used extensively in golf, tee-ball, American football, and rugby. In addition, they are used as training devices for baseball and softball but are not used during gameplay.

== Etymology ==
The word tee is derived from the Old Scots teaz, of unknown origin, possibly Scandinavian; apparently a plural form, or one incorrectly assumed to be so.

== Golf tee ==
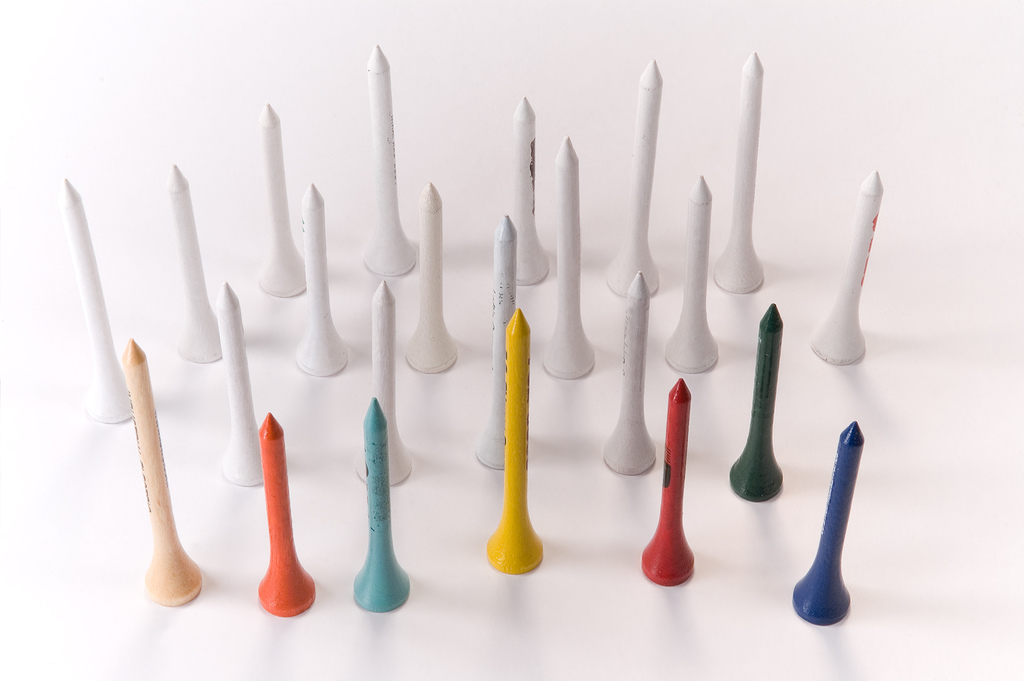
Golf tees

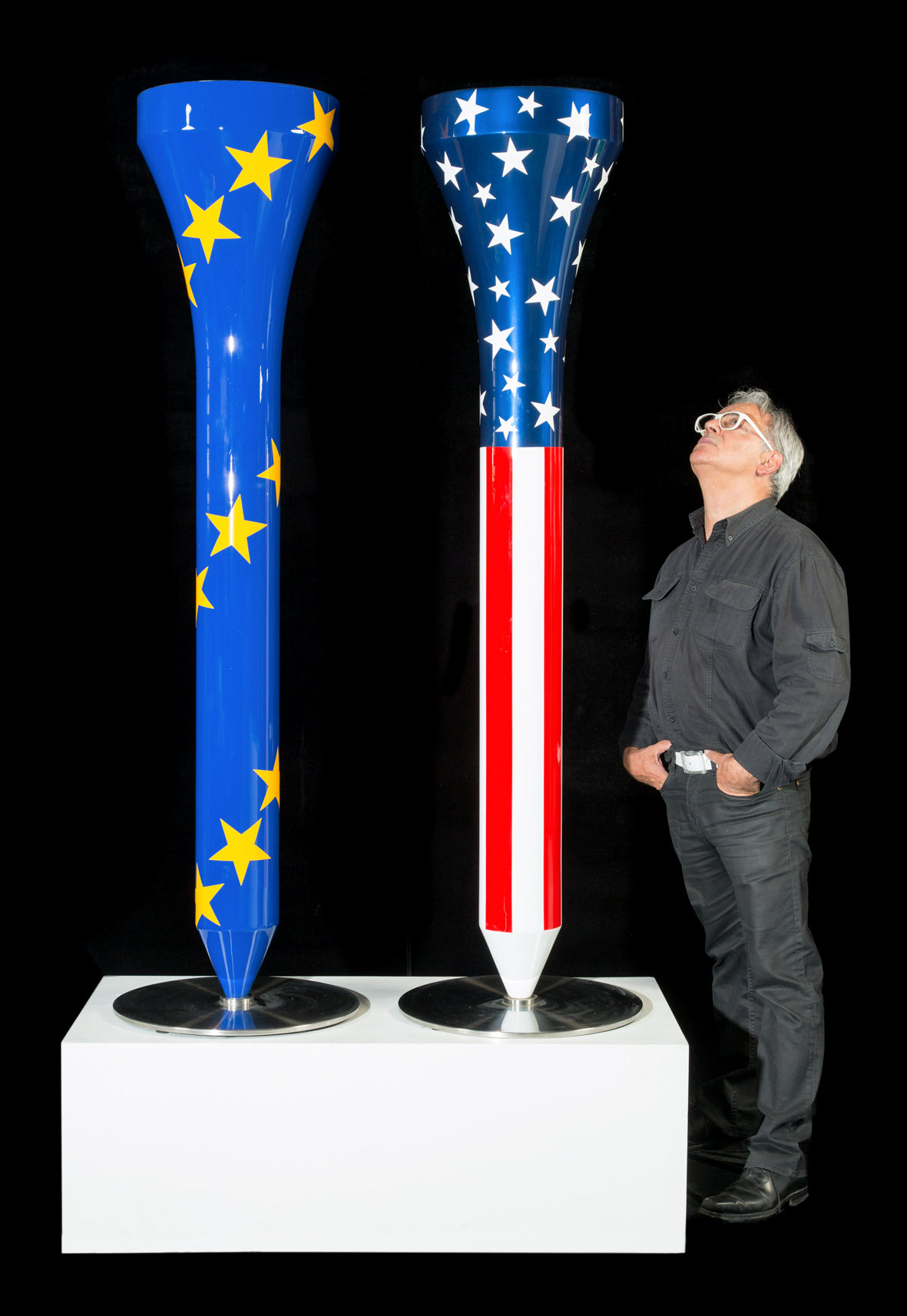
Oversized golf tee sculptures by Hubert Privé for the Ryder Cup.

An angry golfer using a mound of sand to tee a golf ball, depicted on the 1903 cover of Puck

In golf, a tee is normally used for the first stroke of each hole or when dropping in a zone for where it is unplayable. The area from which this first stroke is hit is in the rules known as the teeing area. Normally, teeing the ball is allowed only on the first shot of a hole, called the tee shot, and is illegal for any other shot; however, local or seasonal rules may allow or require teeing for other shots as well, e.g., under "winter rules" to protect the turf when it is unusually vulnerable. Teeing gives a considerable advantage for drive shots, so it is normally done whenever allowed. However, players may elect to play their tee shots without a tee. This typically gives the shot a lower trajectory.

A Smakbak captive golf game, manufactured during the 1920s. The toy was designed for indoor golf play.

A golf tee is a small peg with a rounded top. The tee is used to raise the golf ball above the ground for the first stroke of a hole. Under standard rules of golf, a golf ball can only be teed off at the beginning of a hole. Tees are commonly made of wood or plastic and are available in various lengths. The tee itself was not defined until 2004. Under the R&A and USGA Rules of Golf, a tee must be no longer than 4 inches (101.6 mm) and must not be designed to indicate the line of play or influence the movement of the golf ball.

Ordinary tees can be made from wood or from durable plastic. There are also many biodegradable and recyclable golf tees that diminish the number of trees cut down to manufacture the tees and allow golf courses to lower costs by not having to deal with the broken wooden tees on their courses. Prior to today's wood or plastic tees, golfers used sand to raise the ball. Caddies often scooped sand from the bottom of the hole to form a tee, which caused the hole to deteriorate. This prompted some courses to provide sand in boxes. Today, those boxes hold sand and grass seed to repair divots.

=== History ===
The development of the tee was the last major change to the rules of golf. Before this, golf balls were teed up on little heaps of sand that were provided in boxes. This explains the historical name tee boxes for what is today known as teeing ground.

Between 1976 and 2005, 288 patents with "golf tee" in the title were granted. In 2005, Rand Jerris, then director of the USGA Museum and Archives, said that the adoption of manufactured tees in the 1920s happened quickly, adding that within a "couple years the sand tee disappeared."

Patented golf tees
Patent illustration	Description
This is a small rubber plate used to raise the golf ball off the ground. Figure 3 is on top and shows the ball being placed on this object from a side view. while figure 2 and 1 is in the center from the top looking down view point. Figure 1 differs from Figure 2, as Figure 1 shows it without a golf ball, while Figure 2 has a drawing of a golf ball.	On August 16, 1889, William Bloxsom Secretary and Arthur Douglas, of Scotland, patented a tee with a flat rubber with three prongs or a hollow tube to hold the ball. Its patent GB 12941 was granted in April 1890. This was the first patented golf tee.
There are three figures. This is a small cone object. With a rubber top used to hold up the golf ball with a metal spike used to plant itself into the ground.	On February 29, 1892, Percy Ellis, of Wallington, Surrey, patented the "Perfectum" tee. This was the first tee to penetrate the ground. It used a rubber head and metal spike. His patent GB 3916 was granted in 1892.
English: SPECIFICATION forming part of Letters Patent No. 567,455, dated September 8, 1896. Application filed September 10, 1895. Serial No. 562,682. (No model.) Patented in England February 21,1895, No. 3,735- There are six figures, that show the drawing of how the rubber tee would be combined with an artificial-turf mat. Figures 1 and 3 show a round golf ball sitting on the tee.	On September 10, 1895, Glaswegian David Dalziel of Glasgow, Scotland patented a rubber tee combined with an artificial-turf mat (U.S. 567455). This was the first U.S. patent related to golf tees.
There are seven figures that show how a truncated cone could be made out of paper. Figure three is in the center, showing the small cone holding up a drawing of a golf ball. Figure 1 top left shows how the paper would be cut with notches to make the cone with the paper. Figure 2 shows the paper being folded in an overlapping way to make the cone. Figures 4 and 5 below Figure 3 show an alternative way the paper could have a notch to keep it folded. Figures 6 and 7 show the circular shape that the paper should be in.	On December 16, 1895, P. L. Senat of Philadelphia patented a tee made from paper in the shape of a truncated cone (U.S. 570821).
There are two figures; they show how this tee may be used. A small, simple drawing of a cone with a round circle made to be the ball sitting on the top of the tee.	On February 15, 1896, British patent 253, "An Improved Form of Golfing Tee", was granted to William Kirkwood.
Patent illustration of P. M. Matthews's Victor golf tee, patented in 1897. There are two figures: Figure 1 on the left shows a small object with one spike to be used as a way to stick it in the ground; its top has three small metal spike to hold up the golf ball. Figure 2, has a more cone-shaped, rounded top to hold up the golf ball.	On June 12, 1897, P. M. Matthews of Scotland patented the "Victor" tee (GB 14292).
Patent drawing of George Franklin Grant's golf tee, patented in 1899\. Showing three figures; Figure 1 is in the center, showing a golf ball being placed on the tee. This is a more tube-like object. with a rubber top to hold the golf ball in place, with one wooden spike that would be used to go in the ground. Figure 2 shows the tee shape. Figure 3 is a simple round circle	On December 12, 1899, a Harvard University professor, George Franklin Grant, received U.S. Patent No. 638,920. This tee was a vertical rubber tube attached at its base to wood. Grant's tee was not widely adopted because he did not market it.
Patent drawing of a golf tee from a United States patent filed in 1925. Showing six figures. Figures 1 and 3 are the tee itself; the shape is a small wooden peg with a concave, funnel-shaped top to hold the golf ball up. Figures 5 and 6 show a golf ball being placed on the tee.	On May 5, 1922, William Lowell, Sr. filed a patent application for the "Reddy Tee", which was granted U.S. patent No. 1,493,687 on May 13, 1924.He painted the wood tees red, and he formed the Reddy Tee Co. Lowell hired two professional golfers, Walter Hagen (whom he paid $1500) and Joe Kirkwood Sr., in 1924 as the pair played exhibition matches. The Reddy Tee later fell out of use, and Lowell lost his patent after a legal dispute. In 2005, Rand Jerris, then director of the USGA Museum and Archives, said, "the transformation happened very quickly", adding that "within a couple years the sand tee disappeared."

== Baseball tee ==
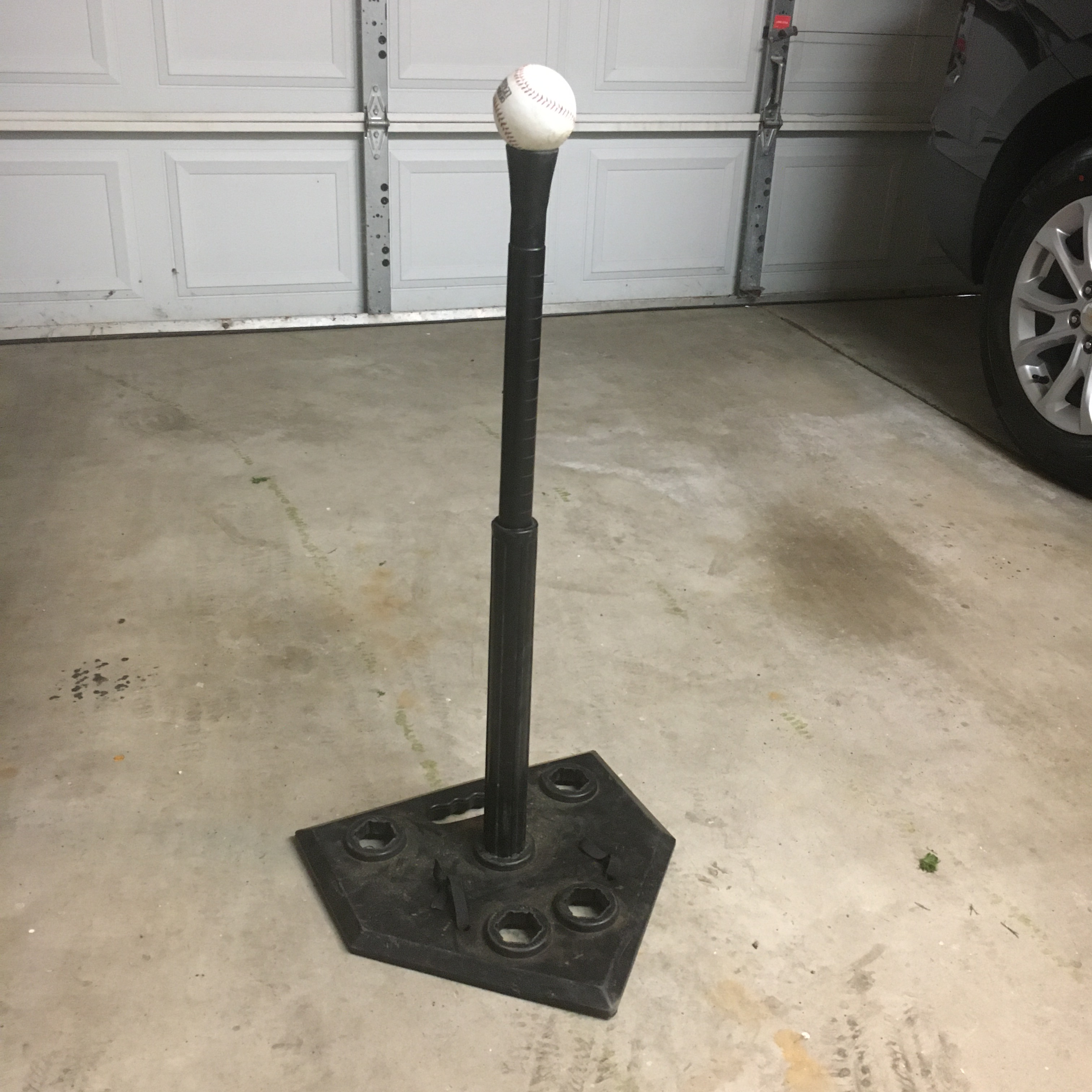
A baseball hitting tee

While a baseball tee is similar to one used in tee-ball, its purpose differs. In baseball, a tee is primarily used as a training aid, allowing hitters to practice hitting pitches in different locations, including inside, outside, high, and low. Unlike tee-ball, where the ball rests on the tee during play, baseball hitters use the tee to simulate pitches they might face during a game. It is also used in batting drills to strengthen a hitter's swing and improve their ability to make contact with balls in different locations.

These tees may also be used in softball as a training device. Tees are not used during gameplay in either sport.

=== Tee-ball tee ===
Tee-ball is based on baseball, with the main difference being the use of a tee in the place of a pitcher. Much larger than a golf tee, the tee-ball tee is a durable rubber stand attached to the home plate which supports the baseball at a suitable height for the batter to hit. It is adjustable to allow for variations in batter height.

== Kicking tee ==
Kicking tees
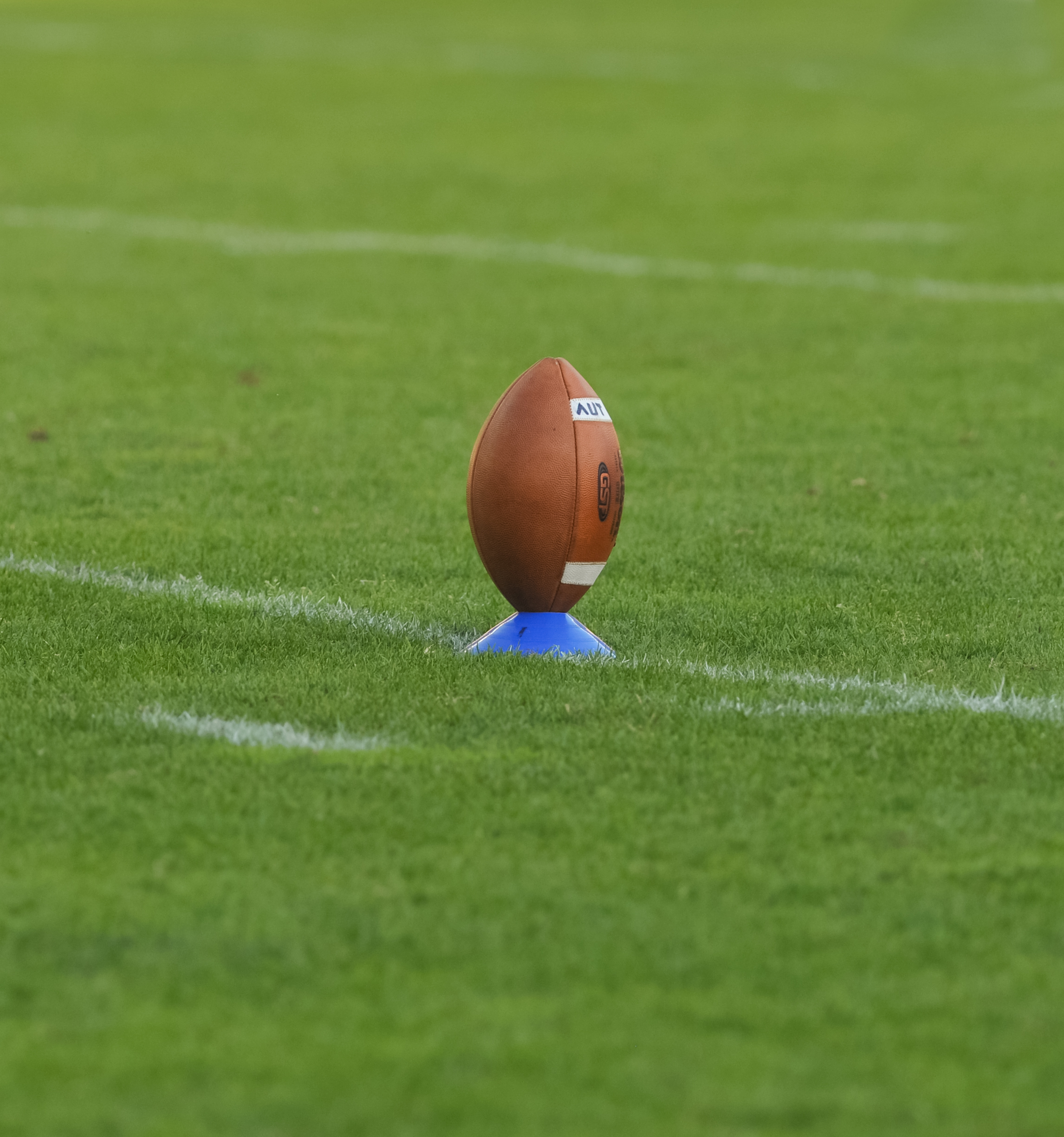
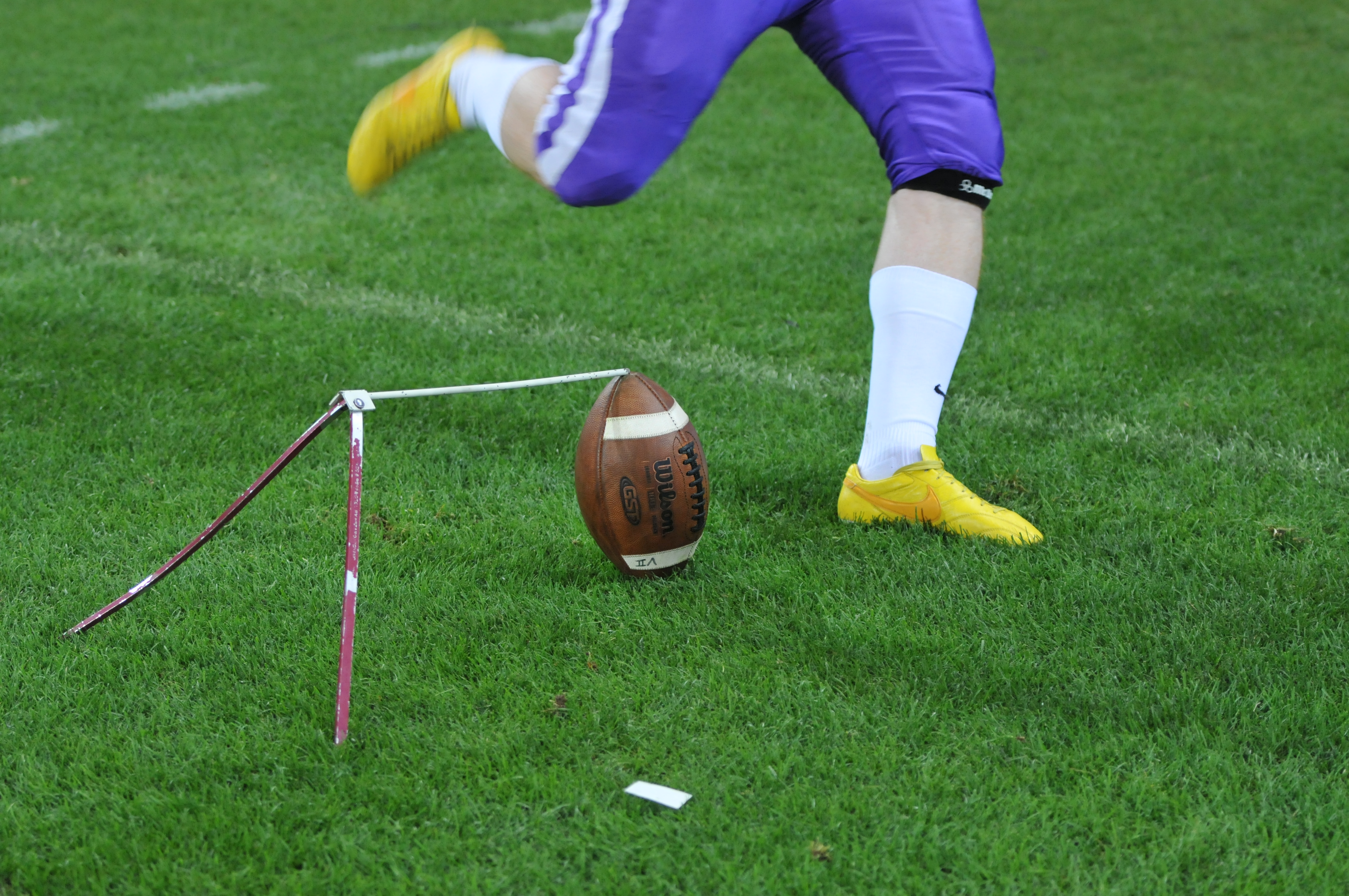
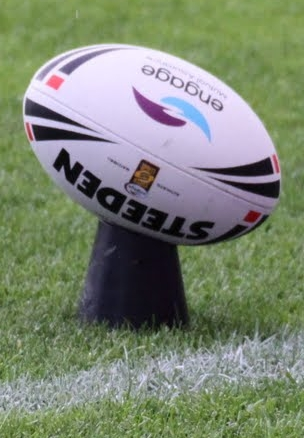
Top: American football, bottom: Rugby football

A kicking tee is a rubber or plastic platform, often with prongs and/or a brim around an inner depression.

In American football and Canadian football, a tee may be used on kickoffs to raise the ball slightly above the playing surface (up to one inch, by NFL and NCAA rules). Its first use is attributed to Arda Bowser, of the Canton Bulldogs the 1922 NFL championship team. The CFL and some high school leagues also allow rubber block; commonly called "tees" come in 1" and 2" types) and holds the opposite end; in college and the NFL, all extra point/field goal attempts can only be made off the ground.

Tees may also be used for place kicks in rugby league football and rugby union football.

Tees are used for kick-outs in Gaelic football. In 2006, Shane Curran devised an adjustable tee on which the ball rested on brush hairs to replicate kicking from grass; the design went on to be used by most goalkeepers.

== See also ==
- Glossary of golf
