= List of storms named Lowell =

The name Lowell has been used for seven tropical cyclones in the Eastern Pacific Ocean:

- Hurricane Lowell (1984), category 1 storm that remained away from land
- Hurricane Lowell (1990), category 1 storm that stayed away from land
- Tropical Storm Lowell (2002), remained out to sea
- Tropical Storm Lowell (2008), made landfall in Baja California and produced major flooding in the Midwest
- Hurricane Lowell (2014), category 1 storm that remained out to sea
- Tropical Storm Lowell (2020), remained out to sea
- Hurricane Lowell (2026), powerful Category 5 hurricane that brushed Hawaii with torrential rain, damaging winds, and dangerous surf
