= Christopher Lowell =

American interior designer

- Born: Richard Lowell Madden; November 6, 1955 (age 70)
- Occupations: Interior decorator, former television personality
- Television: Interior Motives with Christopher Lowell; The Christopher Lowell Show
- Awards: Daytime Emmy Award (2000)
- Website: www.christopherlowellhome.com

Christopher Lowell (born Richard Lowell Madden; November 6, 1955) is an interior decorator and former television personality. He is best known for hosting the television shows Interior Motives and The Christopher Lowell Show. He won a Daytime Emmy Award in 2000 for his work on the latter program.

Beyond his hosting duties, Lowell has also appeared on Hollywood Squares and been a member of the California Boys' Choir. He has designed products for Office Depot and Burlington Coat Factory. In 2008, Lowell hosted a series on Fine Living channel called Work That Room.

Lowell has also written several books.

Lowell left the television business in the late 2000s.

== Filmography ==
- Interior Motives with Christopher Lowell (1997) – TV series, as host
- The Christopher Lowell Show (1999-2003) – as host (also known as It's Christopher Lowell)
- The Wall to Wall Show (2005) – as host
- You Can Do It (2006) – home decorating series, as host
- Work That Room – home decorating series, as host
- The Martin Short Show (1999, 1 episode) – as himself
- The Tonight Show with Jay Leno (2001, 1 episode) – as himself
- Monster Garage (1 episode) – as himself
- Hollywood Squares (2002, 5 episodes) – as himself
- The Wall to Wall Show (2005, 10 episodes) – as himself
- I Love the '90s: Part Deux (2005) – as himself

== Personal life ==
Originally from Portsmouth, New Hampshire, Lowell lived in Boston for part of the 1970s, working variously as an actor, art director, pianist and waiter.

Lowell is gay. On his blog, he calls himself "one of the very first gay men ever to host a daily national television show" although this claim has not been verified.

Lowell has dyslexia.
