= Frances Lowell =

American psychologist

Frances Lowell (October 12, 1886-unknown) was an American educational psychologist known for her research in child psychology, intelligence, and mental age. Lowell earned her bachelor's degree, master's degree, and Ph.D. from the University of Minnesota in 1915, 1917, and 1919 respectively. She held various short-term positions before settling at the Cleveland Board of Education as their clinical psychologist; she held that position from 1925 to 1952, when she retired. Lowell was a member of the American Psychological Association and the Ohio Association of Applied Psychology.
