= New York State Pavilion =

Structures in Queens, New York

- 1964–1965 New York World's Fair New York State Pavilion
- U.S. National Register of Historic Places
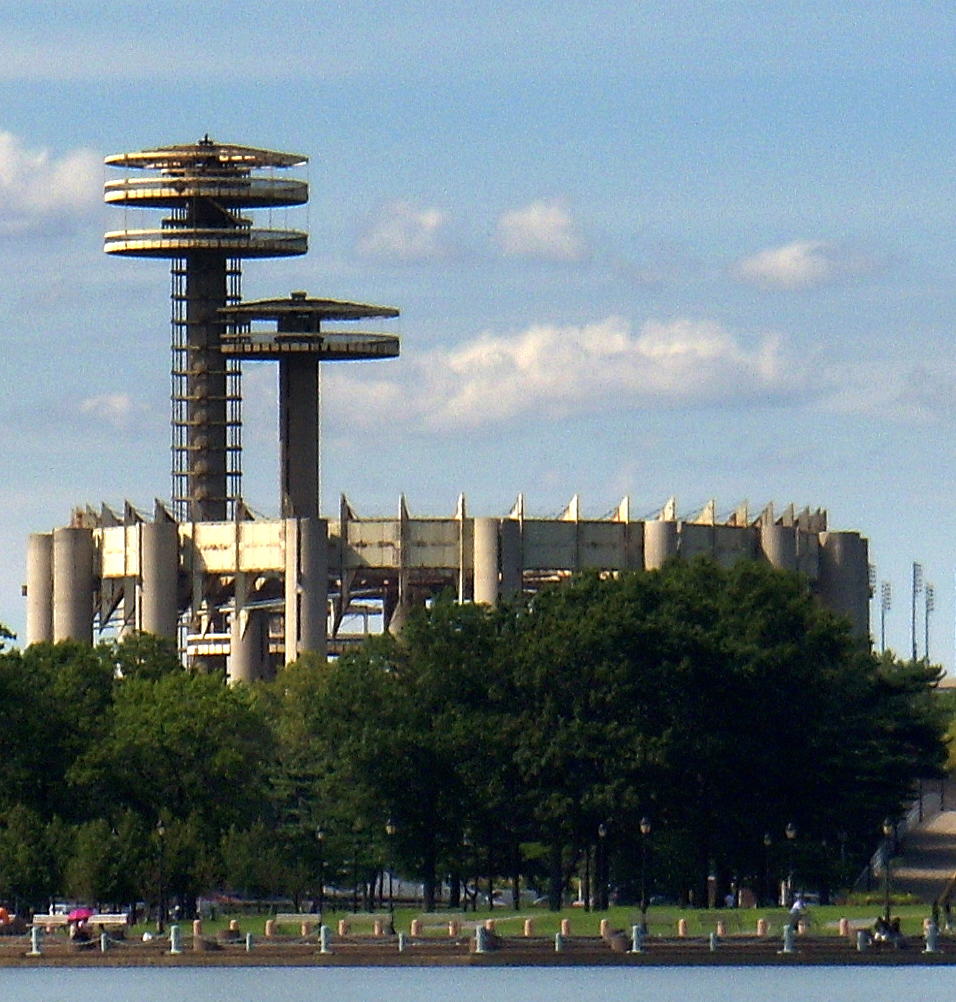
- Seen from Meadow Lake

- Location within New York City Location within New York Location within the United States
- Location: Flushing Meadows–Corona Park, Queens, New York
- Coordinates: 40°44′38.5″N 73°50′39.9″W
- Area: 129,392 square feet (12,020.9 m^{2}; 2.9704 acres; 1.20209 ha)
- Built: 1962–1964
- Architects: Philip Johnson and Richard Foster (architects); Lev Zetlin (structural engineers)
- NRHP reference No.: 09000942
- Added to NRHP: November 20, 2009

The New York State Pavilion is a pavilion at Flushing Meadows–Corona Park in Queens, New York City, New York. Constructed for the 1964 New York World's Fair, it was designed by the architects Philip Johnson and Richard Foster, with Lev Zetlin as the structural engineer. The pavilion consists of three reinforced concrete-and-steel structures: the Tent of Tomorrow, observation towers, and Theaterama. It is owned by the New York City Department of Parks and Recreation (NYC Parks) and listed on the National Register of Historic Places.

The New York State Pavilion was first proposed in January 1960. After the New York state government agreed to host an exhibit at the World's Fair in early 1962, work on the structures began on October 8, 1962. It opened on April 23, 1964, and operated as a World's Fair attraction for two years. NYC Parks took over the structures in 1967 and leased out the Theaterama as a performing-arts theater in 1969. The Tent of Tomorrow briefly served as a concert venue and roller rink in the 1970s, while the observation towers never reopened. After briefly reopening in the 1980s, the Tent of Tomorrow was abandoned into the 21st century. Following years of preservation efforts, the Tent of Tomorrow was repainted in 2014, and the structures underwent rehabilitation starting in 2019.

The Tent of Tomorrow is an elliptical structure measuring 250 by 350 feet (76 by 107 m) across, with a cable suspension roof and a terrazzo highway map of New York state on its floor. There are three observation towers, the tallest of which is 226 feet (69 m) high. The Theaterama, a drum-shaped reinforced concrete structure, has housed the Queens Theatre performing arts center since 1989. The New York State Pavilion was used for TV and movie sets over the years, and it has had generally positive architectural reception.

== Development ==
Flushing Meadows–Corona Park, a former ash dump in the New York City borough of Queens, was used for the 1939/1940 New York World's Fair. At the conclusion of the fair, it was used as a park. The Flushing Meadows site was selected in 1959 for the 1964 New York World's Fair. Gilmore David Clarke and Michael Rapuano, designers of the original World's Fair layout, were retained to tailor the original 1939 park layout for the new fair. New York City parks commissioner Robert Moses was president of the World's Fair Corporation, which leased the park from the city until 1967, after the fair's completion.

=== Planning ===
Moses had proposed a World's Fair pavilion for the government of New York state as early as January 1960, four months before he became the president of the World's Fair Corporation. By late 1960, Moses was drawing up plans for exhibits at the pavilion, including exhibits about tourism, New York state geography, and the New York Power Authority. The corporation's officials discussed the location of the proposed pavilion for over a year, and they ultimately selected a site known as Block 46 in May 1961. The site covered 129,392 square feet (12,021 m^{2}) and was chosen specifically because it was slightly larger than Block 45, which was to be occupied by the government of New Jersey. Negotiations over potential exhibits, including discussions over a potential fashion exhibit, continued through 1961.

New York's lieutenant governor, Malcolm Wilson, signed a contract with the World's Fair Corporation in February 1962, allowing the government of New York state to sponsor an exhibit at the 1964 World's Fair. At the time, the governments of 30 states and Puerto Rico were planning pavilions at the fair, and the New York State Pavilion was to be the largest of these structures. The pavilion was one of two structures that the New York state government would erect for the World's Fair, along with the New York State Theater in Manhattan. (Note: The state government had also proposed a conservation center along Meadow Lake to the south, but the plan was canceled.) During the pavilion's development, New York governor Nelson Rockefeller sought to divert funds from the project to the New York State Theater, since the pavilion was originally supposed to be temporary. It was also one of several exhibit spaces in the World's Fair that focused on New York; there were also pavilions for New York City, the Port of New York Authority, and the Long Island Rail Road.

Five architects participated in an unofficial architectural design competition. Philip Johnson, who also designed the New York State Theater, was hired to design the pavilion in mid-1962. Johnson later stated that Rockefeller had personally selected him for the project. The Thompson–Starrett Company received the general contract for construction. At the time, the World's Fair Corporation had already created preliminary plans for structures on Block 46. Although the structures were initially meant to be temporary, Moses and Johnson had agreed to create a permanent theater for the site by June 1962. Another change to the original plans was the addition of observation towers, since Rockefeller wanted the New York State Pavilion to be the tallest structure in the fair. Initially, the World's Fair Corporation would not allow any structures higher than 80 feet (24 m) in the fair's federal and state section. After Johnson persisted, the corporation agreed in August 1962 to allow the New York State Pavilion to include taller structures.

=== Construction ===
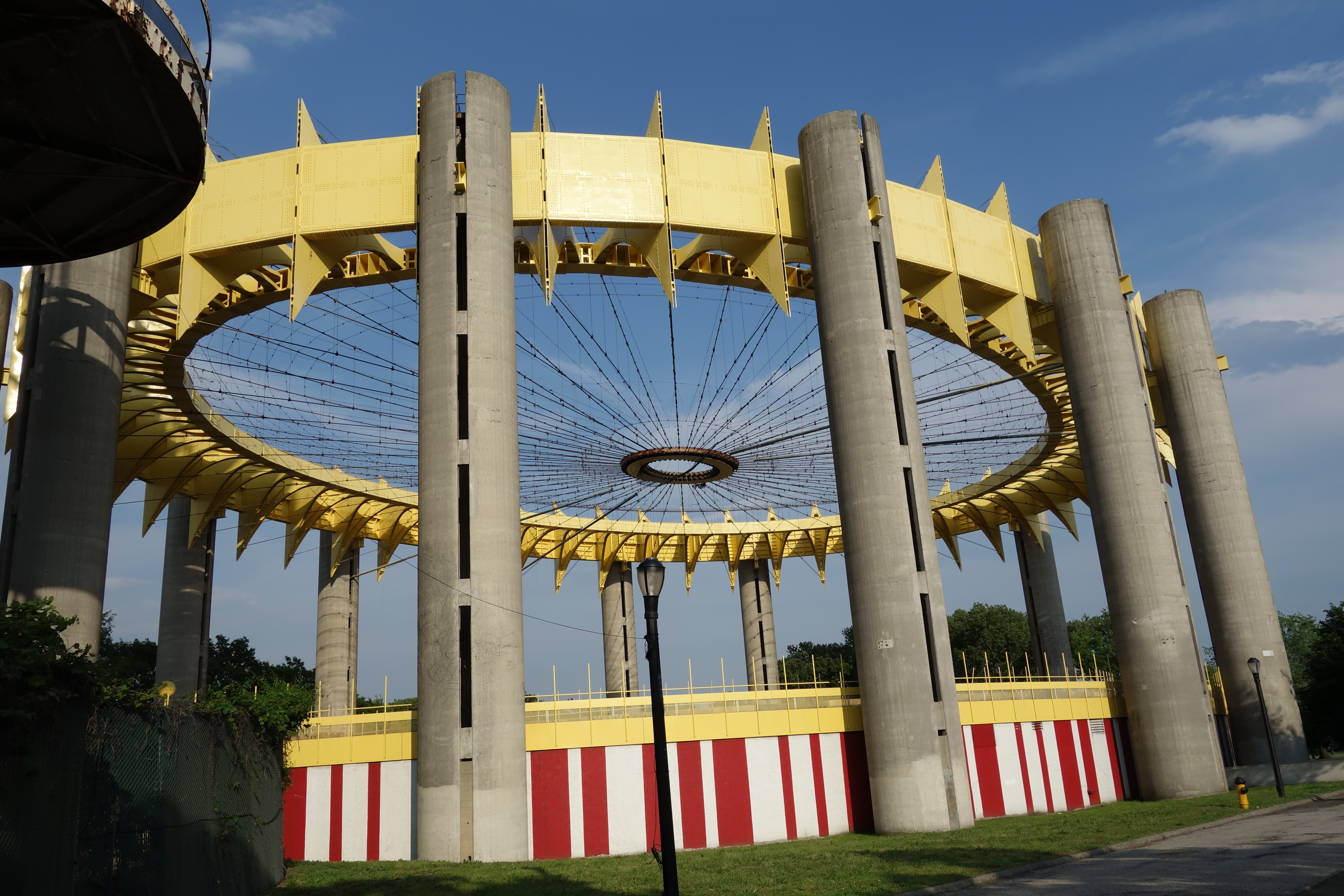
The exterior of the Tent of Tomorrow seen from the northwest

Details of the New York State Pavilion were announced on October 8, 1962, when Rockefeller drove a deep foundation into the ground during a groundbreaking ceremony for the pavilion. The structure was to contain a Tent of Tomorrow (also known as the County Fair of the Future) for exhibits and events, a theater called Theaterama, and three observation towers. The state government allocated $11 million to the World's Fair, expecting to earn revenue by selling tickets to the pavilion's restaurants and observation deck. Officials estimated that the pavilion would have 12 million to 13 million visitors during the World's Fair, which was to last two years. Revisions to the design continued through early 1963, when the foundations were modified to allow the structures to remain standing for a longer period.

In November 1962, fashion firms had asked the state government for permission to stage fashion exhibits in the Tent of Tomorrow, but there was initial uncertainty about whether these companies would use the New York State Pavilion or get their own pavilion. The state government allowed fashion companies from New York to use the pavilion in 1963, after Wilson asked the New York State Commission on the World's Fair to make space for the fashion exhibits. Wilson opposed the addition of some other exhibits (such as those themed to parole and correction), saying that he did not want to create a "Madame Tussaud's Waxworks" for attention. Joseph Love was hired to organize the fashion exhibits in the pavilion. Although Love reached out to 20,000 companies to determine their interest in the pavilion, only 50 companies had responded by the end of 1963.

Workers began pouring concrete for the observation towers' columns in June 1963, and the layout of the Tent of Tomorrow had been finalized by the middle of that year. Each column was built atop 50 deep foundations. Workers constructed the columns by pouring concrete around cylindrical forms that measured 12 feet (3.7 m) across and 3 feet (0.91 m) high. Civil rights groups protested the New York State Pavilion's construction in mid-1963, after a study found that only two of the 68 workers there were African Americans, and they sued in an attempt to halt construction. In October 1963, Johnson hired 10 avant-garde artists to create artwork for the Theaterama; the Hudson Valley Art Association characterized the art as "at best a farce". Simultaneously, the cable suspension roof of the Tent of Tomorrow was constructed at ground level, and workers began installing the roof panels before the roof was raised. The suspension roof was raised to the top of the tent's columns at the end of October, using jacks that lifted the roof 2.5 feet (0.76 m) at a time.

The flags of New York state and the U.S. were hoisted to the top of the highest observation tower at a ceremony in December 1963. The New York State Council on the Arts also announced plans for two art exhibits at the pavilion, one during each of the World's Fair's two operating seasons. By January 1964, the pavilion's predicted final cost had increased to $13.8 million. The New York State Legislature was reluctant to allocate a $4.6 million appropriation to complete the pavilion, but eventually granted the appropriation. The cost increases prompted an investigation from Louis J. Lefkowitz, the state's attorney general, who looked into the records of several hundred subcontractors.

== World's Fair use ==
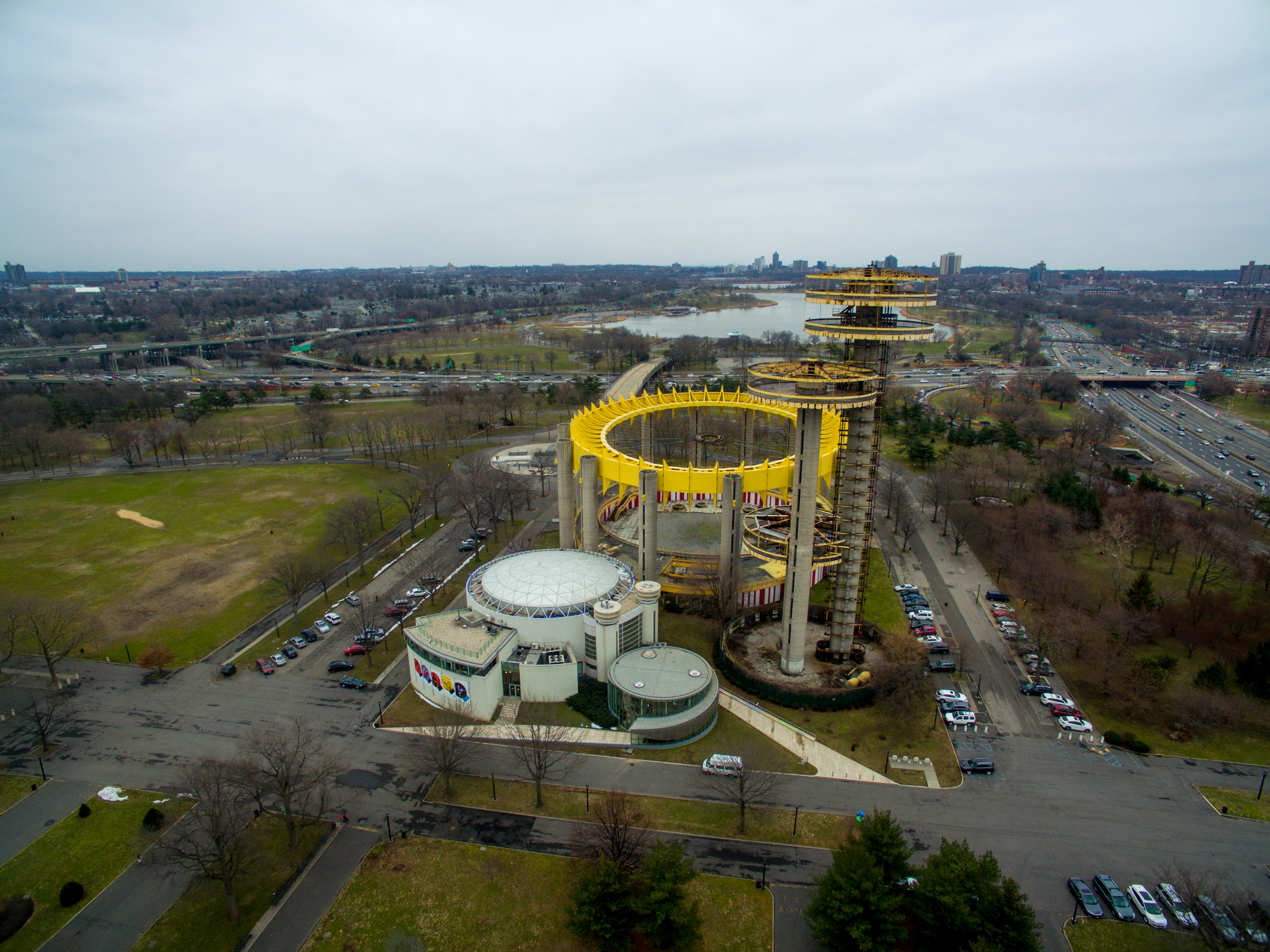
Overhead view of the New York State Pavilion in 2017. The Theaterama is visible in the left foreground, while the observation towers are in the right foreground. Behind them is the Tent of Tomorrow.

The Tent of Tomorrow hosted concerts, and it was one of two locations (along with the Better Living Center) where fashion shows were staged. The main level had a restaurant, a fine arts exhibit, and a New York Power Authority exhibit. The tent's mezzanine showcased local museums' exhibits, a rose garden, exhibits on industries, and other aspects of New York state culture. There was also to be a restaurant themed to a farmers market. The three towers were used as an observation deck, a concession stand, and a dignitaries' lounge. The highest observation tower also had an exhibition by the State Legislature, with a suggestion box for laws; a machine with FAQs about the legislature; and a short film. The Theaterama displayed films that highlighted various visitor attractions in New York state, in addition to exhibits with art relating to the state. Corning Glass, General Electric, American Bridge Company, and Schweizer Aircraft were among the companies that exhibited at the pavilion.

=== 1964 season ===
Moses and Rockefeller formally opened the World's Fair on April 23, 1964. In his dedication speech, Rockefeller indicated that the pavilion might become a permanent fixture of the park; Moses also wanted the New York State and U.S. pavilions to be preserved. During the opening ceremony, hundreds of civil rights activists organized a sit-in at the pavilion and were arrested. During the 1964 season, the New York State Pavilion displayed a visual-art exhibit called The River: People and Places, with 50 works that represented the state's early history or early artists. More than 500 talent show performances were scheduled at the pavilion during the 1964 season. Many of these performances were grouped according to geographic location or cultural background, so that acts with a similar theme were performed on the same day. Thirteen fashion magazines staged shows on the Tent of Tomorrow's ramp.

At the midpoint of the 1964 season that July, The New York Times reported that the New York State Pavilion was one of the fair's most popular exhibits. Admission to the Theaterama cost 25 cents each, while admission to the observation towers cost 50 cents for adults and 25 cents for children. In the Theaterama's first eight weeks of operation, 200,000 people paid to watch the short film there. By that August, nearly 1.4 million people had ridden the observation towers' elevators. The pavilion closed for the season on October 18, 1964. According to a National Park Service report, toward the end of the 1964 season, nearly one-quarter of all visitors to the World's Fair were recorded as having visited the New York State Pavilion, or about 55,000 people daily. The exhibit was reportedly the World's Fair's third-most-popular pavilion, which also made it a frequent location for civil rights protests.

=== 1965 season ===
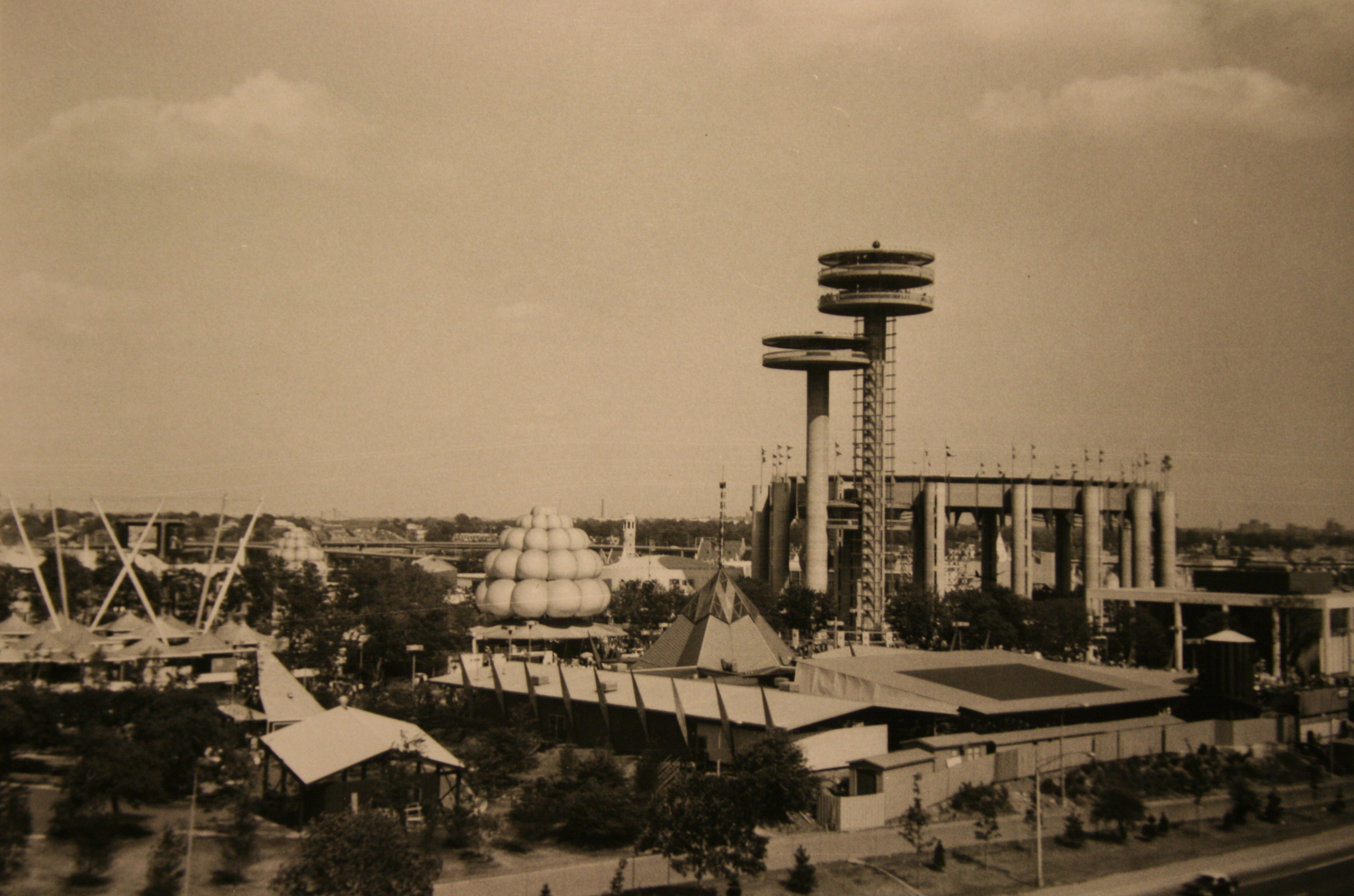
The New York State Pavilion during the 1965 season of the World's Fair

In early 1965, Moses wrote to the Mayor's Committee on the Future of Flushing Meadow, asking them to retain the New York State Pavilion after the World's Fair ended; most of the fair's other structures were to be demolished. Moses proposed converting the pavilion to a concert venue and recreational facility. That March, the New York State Comptroller's office launched an investigation into the construction costs of the pavilion. Comptroller Arthur Levitt ultimately determined that the pavilion had cost $12,292,225 to erect, slightly lower than the predicted final cost of about $12.4 million but much higher than the original budget of $3.825 million.

The pavilion itself reopened at the beginning of the World's Fair's second season on April 21, 1965. As with the preceding season, the New York State Pavilion hosted live entertainment throughout the day. An art exhibit called The City: People and Places was displayed at the New York State Pavilion for the 1965 season; it consisted of 50 pieces created between 1880 and 1958. Absent during the 1965 season were several companies that had hosted fashion shows at the pavilion during the 1964 season. Additionally, though the New York state government had predicted that the pavilion's Wing of Fashion would attract thousands of fashion companies, only 132 firms had signed up for space during the 1965 season.

The mayor's committee recommended in mid-1965 that the New York State Pavilion be demolished after the fair, even though Moses and the state government supported its preservation. Moses proposed restoring the pavilion after the fair as part of a $6.3 million program to renovate the park, and the Queens Federation of Civic Council also launched a fundraiser to preserve the structure. At a presentation to state legislators in July 1965, Moses proposed that the pavilion be retained as an icon of Queens, similar to how the Eiffel Tower had become an icon of Paris after the Exposition Universelle of 1889. The fair's second and final season ended on October 18, 1965. The World's Fair Corporation mandated that most exhibition buildings in Flushing Meadows Park be demolished within 90 days of the fair's closure, but city officials were negotiating to preserve the New York State and U.S. pavilions. As such, the demolition contracts for the pavilions were postponed. In December 1965, the New York City Board of Estimate voted to preserve the New York State Pavilion, and the state government agreed to spend $750,000 upgrading the pavilion to meet New York City building codes. Johnson later recalled that the pavilion was preserved largely because of the high cost of demolition.

== After the fair ==
=== Late 1960s to 1980s ===
Discussions over the future use of the New York State Pavilion and other nearby pavilions continued for months after the World's Fair closed. For example, city officials proposed converting Flushing Meadows into a "sports park" in 1966 and converting the pavilion into a sports venue, but this never happened. In the years immediately after the fair, the Tent of Tomorrow hosted events such as a judo competition. Despite parks commissioner Thomas P. F. Hoving's reluctance to take over ownership of the New York State Pavilion, the New York City Department of Parks and Recreation (NYC Parks) ultimately acquired the pavilion when Flushing Meadows Park was dedicated in June 1967. The pavilion, along with the other remaining World's Fair structures in the park, was rededicated in 1968 as part of a proposed cultural center.

==== Reopening of Theaterama and Tent of Tomorrow ====
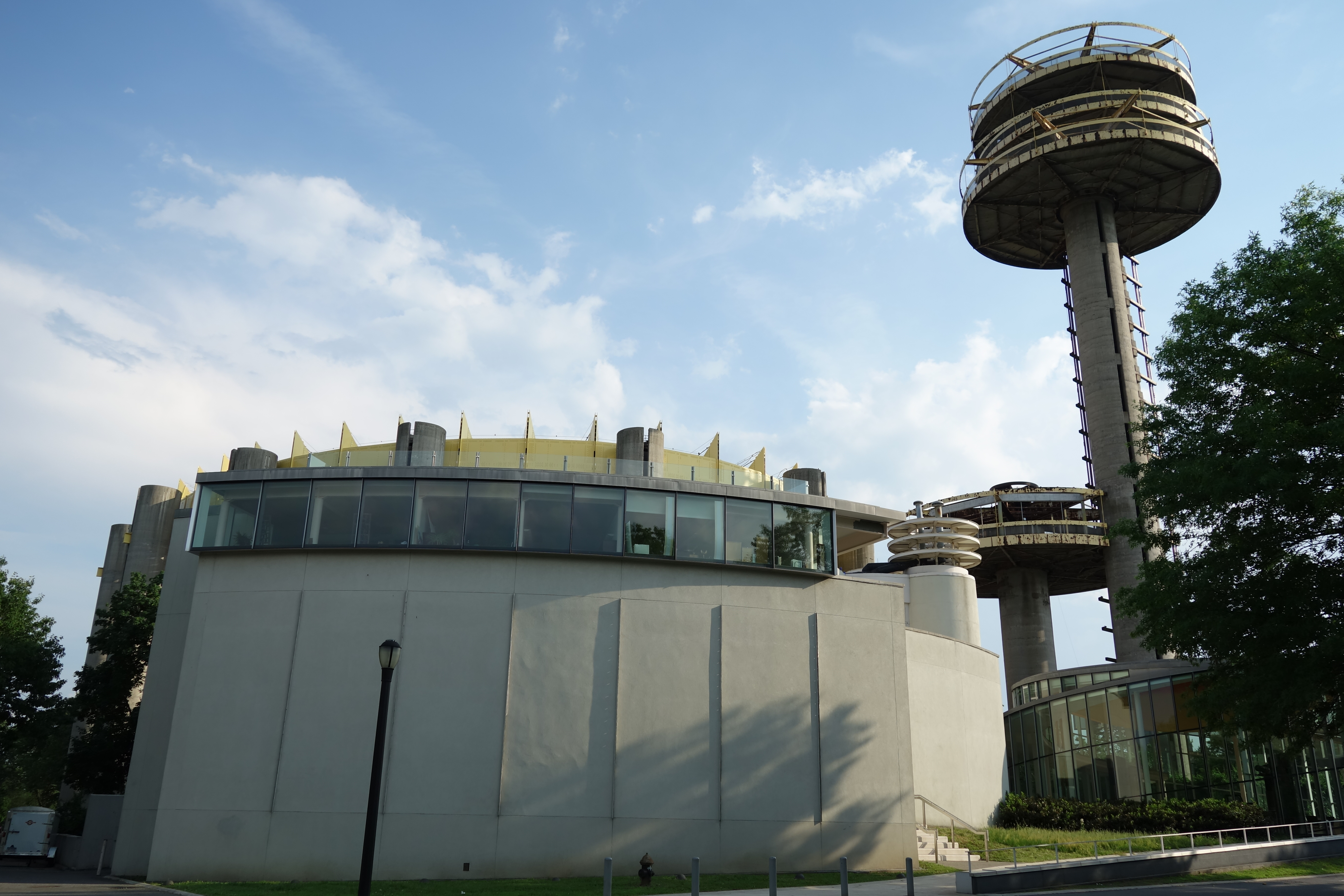
The Theaterama was converted into a theater in 1968.

The Board of Estimate voted to allow Joseph Kutrzeba's theatrical group, Queens Playhouse, to use the Theaterama in December 1967, and NYC Parks leased the Theaterama to Queens Playhouse the next month. NYC Parks also promised to fund up to $200,000 in renovations, and Philip Johnson and theater consultant P. Donald Howard were hired to convert the Theaterama into a 500-seat performing-arts venue. The modifications included new lighting and a semi-thrust stage, as well as removal of some of the original decor. Due to difficulties in raising funds, the Queens Playhouse did not move into the Theaterama until October 1972. During the 1970s, several groups took turns operating the Theaterama.

A Newsday reporter wrote in early 1969 that the observation towers and the Tent of Tomorrow had been locked, though the tent was being used for concerts by the middle of 1969. Led Zeppelin and the Grateful Dead hosted rock concerts in the tent, and the music promoter Bill Graham also booked pop concerts there. The Tent of Tomorrow was temporarily closed in 1970 due to concerns that the plastic roof was decaying. The next year, the Queens Council on the Arts sought to convert the pavilion into a performing-arts center. In early 1972, NYC Parks and the New York City Department of Cultural Affairs announced that they would lease the Tent of Tomorrow to a roller-rink operator, and a local company offered to pay $6 million to renovate the tent into a roller rink. Queens Community Board 4 threatened to request an injunction to prevent the tent from being leased until public hearings were hosted. David Oats and Eric Ierardi, the leaders of the Friends of Flushing Meadows group, also circulated a petition to save the pavilion, obtaining 20,000 signatures by that February.

The Tent of Tomorrow's roller rink opened in March 1972 and was operating at capacity within three months. People skated directly above the tent's terrazzo floor, prompting concerns that it would deteriorate, and parts of the floor were also covered with cement to accommodate roller skaters. To limit damage to the floor, the rink's operators, Robert and Chris Jelin, placed a layer of plastic above the floor, and they only used skates with plastic and wooden wheels. Because the rink was an open-air facility, it had to close during the winters. By August, there were calls to convert the rink into a year-round facility, although the rink's operators estimated that the city would have to spend as much as $50,000 to build a temporary bubble over the rink. Queens Playhouse also stored its equipment and furniture in the pavilion. The observation towers were still unused. In advance of the United States Bicentennial, in 1973, the Queens Bicentennial Commission proposed converting the New York State Pavilion into a venue for exhibits, performances, and events.

==== 1970s and 1980s changes ====
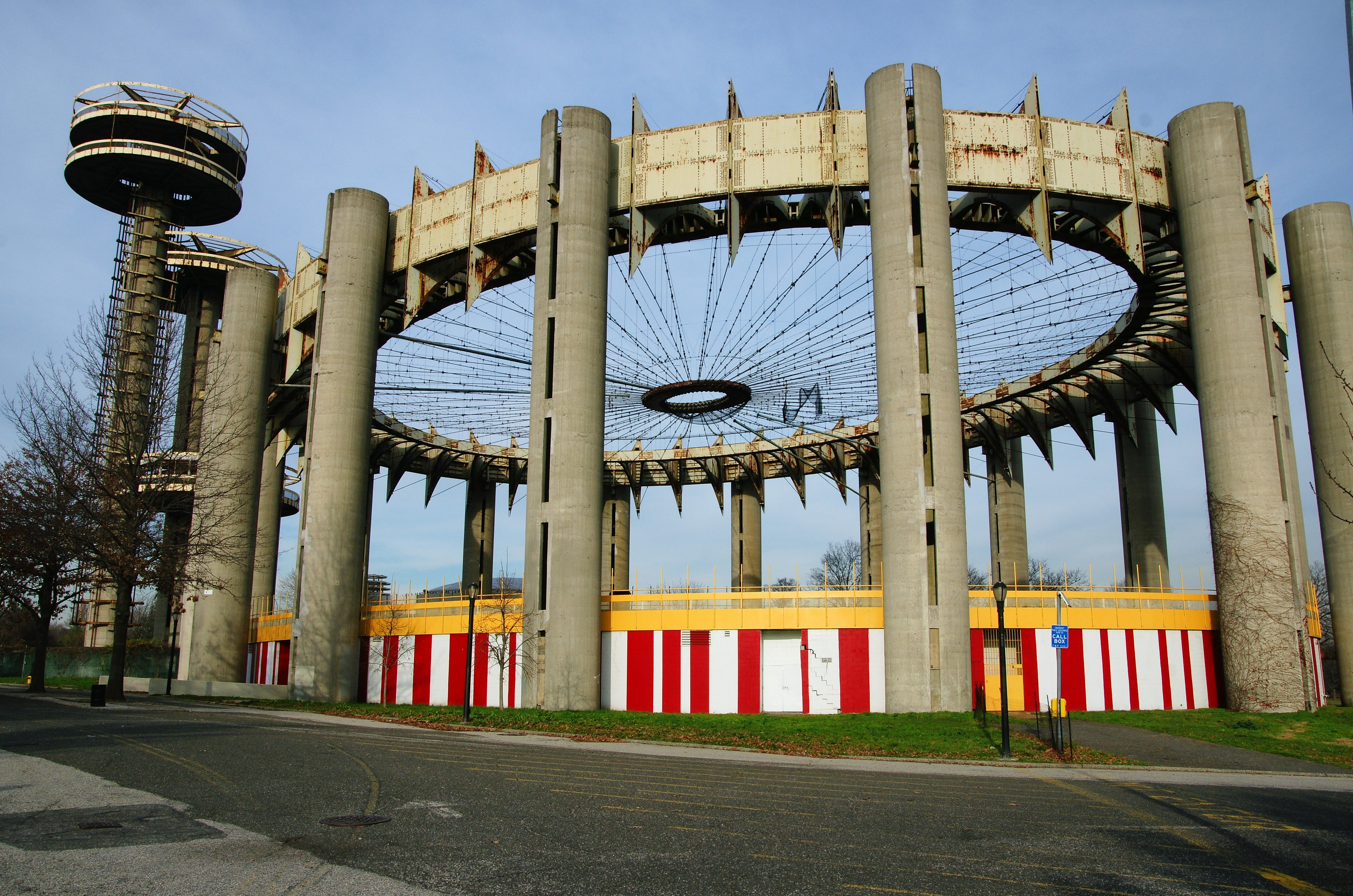
The New York State Pavilion as seen from the southwest

The New York City government abruptly closed the Tent of Tomorrow and canceled Robert Jelin's lease in July 1974 after finding severe damage to the roof. Jelin proposed spending $50,000 to dismantle the roof. The city government approved the rink's reopening on the condition that the roof be removed first, and the Tent of Tomorrow's roof panels were removed in the late 1970s. This left the Queens Playhouse as the pavilion's only occupant. Another rink ultimately opened in 1978 at the World's Fair's former Post Office building. Drums of hazardous waste from the Post Office building were relocated to the New York State Pavilion, where they remained until mid-1979.

By the late 1970s, Oats was petitioning state officials to find a company to restore the terrazzo map on the Tent of Tomorrow's floor, which was decaying. According to Oats, the film director Sidney Lumet had offered to repair the pavilion when he was shooting his 1978 film The Wiz there. The New York City government rejected Lumet's offer, telling him to restore the pavilion as he found it. The Theater in the Park was renovated for $150,000 between 1981 and 1982, and the rest of the pavilion was cleaned and repaired during early 1983. The pavilion reopened as a venue for children's entertainment in mid-1983. The city also asked the state and federal governments for money to further renovate the pavilion. During the 1980s, Hoving wanted to raze the tent and towers. A local architect proposed converting the tent into a theater in the round, while another proposal called for the pavilion to be renovated into a branch of the National Museum of the American Indian.

The Theater in the Park closed in 1985 and stood abandoned for several years. During the same decade, the tent was closed to the public altogether due to safety concerns. The Queens Theatre began performing within the Theaterama in 1989. By then, the theater needed extensive structural repairs; the roof had a hole in it, and the walls were covered in graffiti. The Queens Theatre's director also said at the time that the Theaterama building was used by squatters and that it was missing doors. Although there were various proposals to reopen the towers, they were rejected due to the high cost of restoration. The map in the Tent of Tomorrow was also deteriorating.

=== 1990s and 2000s ===
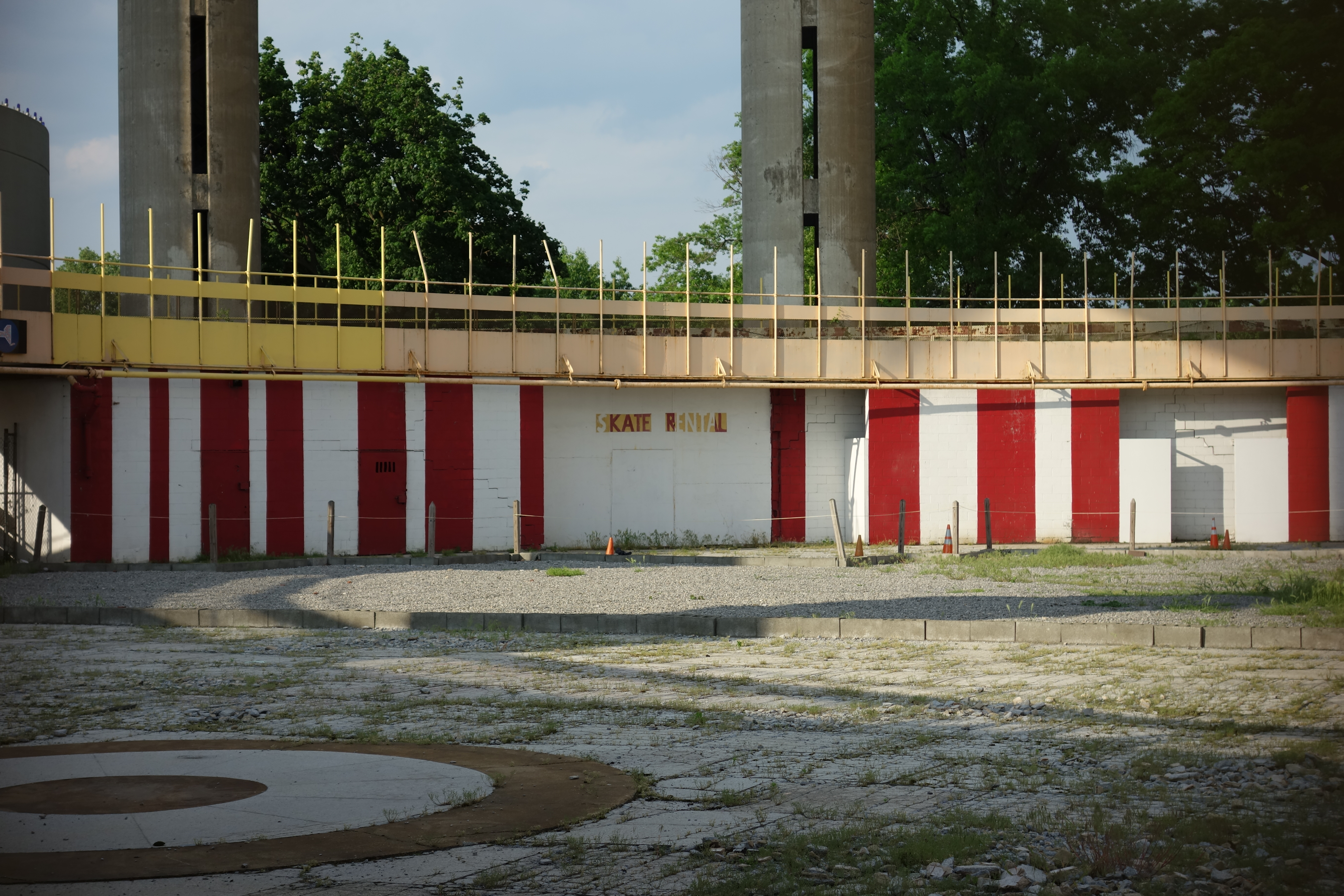
The abandoned interior of the Tent of Tomorrow

By the late 20th century, the tent and towers were completely abandoned, and one of the towers' elevators was stuck in midair. The Theaterama was renovated beginning in 1992, and the project was completed in October 1993 for $4 million. The project was designed by Alfredo De Vido and included a new lobby and entrance, as well as upgrades to the mechanical systems, catwalk, stage, seating, and rehearsal spaces. Part of the Tent of Tomorrow became a rehearsal space as well, and the Queens Theatre also wanted to convert the rest of the pavilion into additional rehearsal and performance spaces. The terrazzo map in the tent would have been restored as well. In 1994, the city government announced that it would spend $208,000 to hire a consultant to prepare a feasibility study for the observation towers and Tent of Tomorrow. The feasibility study was conducted during the late 1990s.

The New York City Department of Design and Construction hired Caples Jefferson Architects in 2000 to renovate the Theaterama, and planning for that project continued for several years. By then, preservationists wanted the New York City Landmarks Preservation Commission (LPC) to designate the structures as a city landmark, though the commission did not hold hearings on the proposed designation for several years. Many parts of the Tent of Tomorrow's terrazzo floor map were covered with cement and vandalized. The observation towers' stairs were also extensively deteriorated. Henry Stern, the city's park commissioner at the time, described it as "too good to tear down, but not good enough to spend $20 million to restore". In late 2001, two Arizona men proposed converting the pavilion into an aviation museum; although Johnson favored the proposal, several officials called it infeasible.

The city announced plans in 2004 to renovate the Theaterama building for $5.2 million, adding a new cabaret and entrance hall. The city also wanted to restore the Tent of Tomorrow but did not have enough money. NYC Parks began soliciting proposals for the tent's renovation that year, and it received two formal proposals, both of which were rejected. Work on the Theaterama began in 2005. The next year, an aviation obstruction light on the tallest observation tower was broken for several months until the city government hired mountain climbers to fix the light. The New York Landmarks Conservancy listed the New York State Pavilion as one of the city's most endangered sites in 2006, and the World Monuments Fund added the pavilion to the 2008 World Monuments Watch, a list of the world's 100 most endangered structures, the following year. The borough president at the time, Helen M. Marshall, wanted to demolish the structures, but NYC Parks' 2008 master plan for Flushing Meadows–Corona Park called for its preservation.

Researchers from the University of Pennsylvania began restoring a small number of the Tent of Tomorrow's terrazzo tiles in 2008. The towers' elevators were removed that year because of concerns that pieces would fall off during high winds, and the elevators were left to rot in Flushing. In late 2008, the city government nominated the pavilion for inclusion on the National Register of Historic Places (NRHP), allowing the pavilion to receive federal preservation funds. The LPC also considered designating the pavilion as a landmark. The pavilion was added to both the New York State Register of Historic Places and the NRHP in 2009. Robert Silman Associates completed an engineering report on the Tent of Tomorrow that year, finding severe damage to wooden beams, walls, concrete, and cables. The firm estimated that it would cost up to $29 million to restore the tent, compared with $9.7 million to raze it. During 2009, volunteers began repainting the tent's base, clearing debris, and covering the terrazzo map with gravel and sand. That year, the Pavilion Paint Project was also established to repaint the pavilion.

=== 2010s to present ===
In late 2013, NYC Parks indicated that it would cost $73 million to restore the site, as opposed to the $14 million cost of demolishing the structure. NYC Parks decided against demolishing the New York State Pavilion due to large amounts of public opposition to demolishing the structures. Other options for the structures included stabilizing the site without public access, which would cost $43 million, and stabilizing and reopening the site to the public, which would cost $52 million. NYC Parks devised plans to update the equipment systems and rebuild the towers' perimeter walls, and the design firm Perkins + Will created a proposal for the adaptive reuse of the structures. Preservationists founded the People for the Pavilion group in the early 2010s to advocate for the pavilion's restoration.

==== 2014–2016: Repainting and further restoration proposals ====
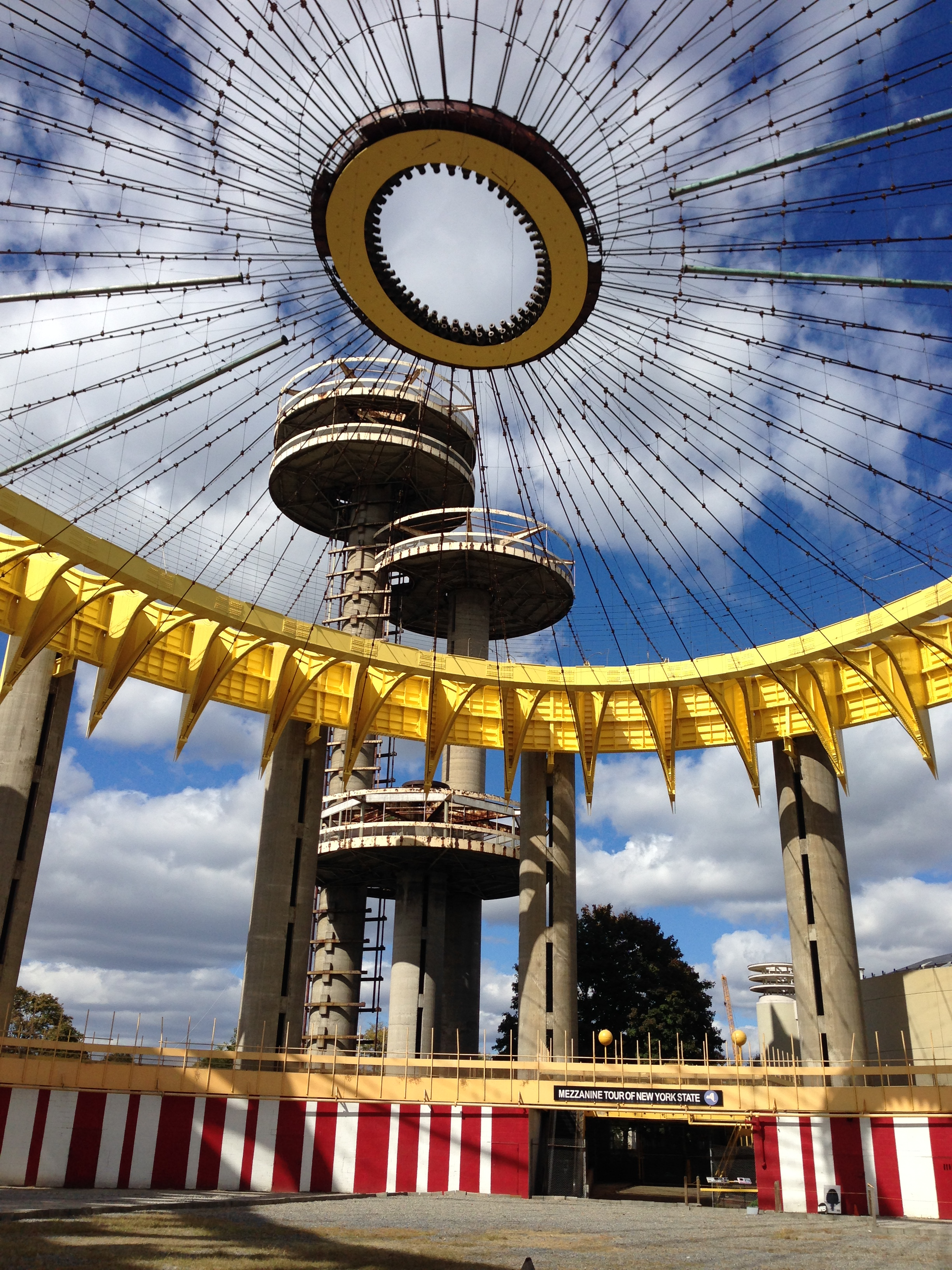
The interior of the main structure in 2015, after repainting

Renewed interest was shown in the pavilion's restoration in early 2014, though there were still proposals to demolish the structures. Melinda Katz, who became Queens's borough president in 2014, promised to preserve the pavilion and allocated some funds to its renovation that year. The manufacturers of the Tent of Tomorrow's terrazzo map asked NYC Parks to restore the map. The Pavilion Paint Project briefly reopened the tent to the public for the 50th anniversary of the World's Fair on April 22, 2014, and the National Trust for Historic Preservation named the pavilion as one of its National Treasures that day. At the time, the Pavilion State Pavilion had raised $4,000 for restoration; other funding came from the city government (which gave $5.8 million) and the New York Mets. The University of Central Florida (UCF) and architectural archive website CyArk began raising $15,000 to fund a 3D laser scan of the pavilion that May. UCF began scanning the pavilion that June. The Tent of Tomorrow's terrazzo map was damaged that July by arsonists.

Local officials announced plans in March 2015 to illuminate the pavilion and began testing out a lighting system that month. In May 2015, several labor unions announced that they would repaint Tent of Tomorrow. The majority of the labor was done by union trainees, and contractors donated $3 million worth of materials to repaint the tent yellow. Workers spent over 8,000 man-hours on the repainting, which required 1,600 US gallons (6,100 L) of paint. All work was completed by August 2015. By that October, the city was awarding a design contract for the pavilion's structural stabilization and electrical upgrades.

People for the Pavilion and the National Trust for Historic Preservation launched an international ideas competition for the pavilion in March 2016. The competition garnered 250 submissions, which ranged from facetious proposals to those submitted by professional architects. The winning design called for the structures to become a hanging garden; this proposal, and three others, were displayed at the nearby Queens Museum. Two proposals from the contest received New York City's 2018 Annual Awards for Excellence in Design.

==== 2017–present: Renovation ====
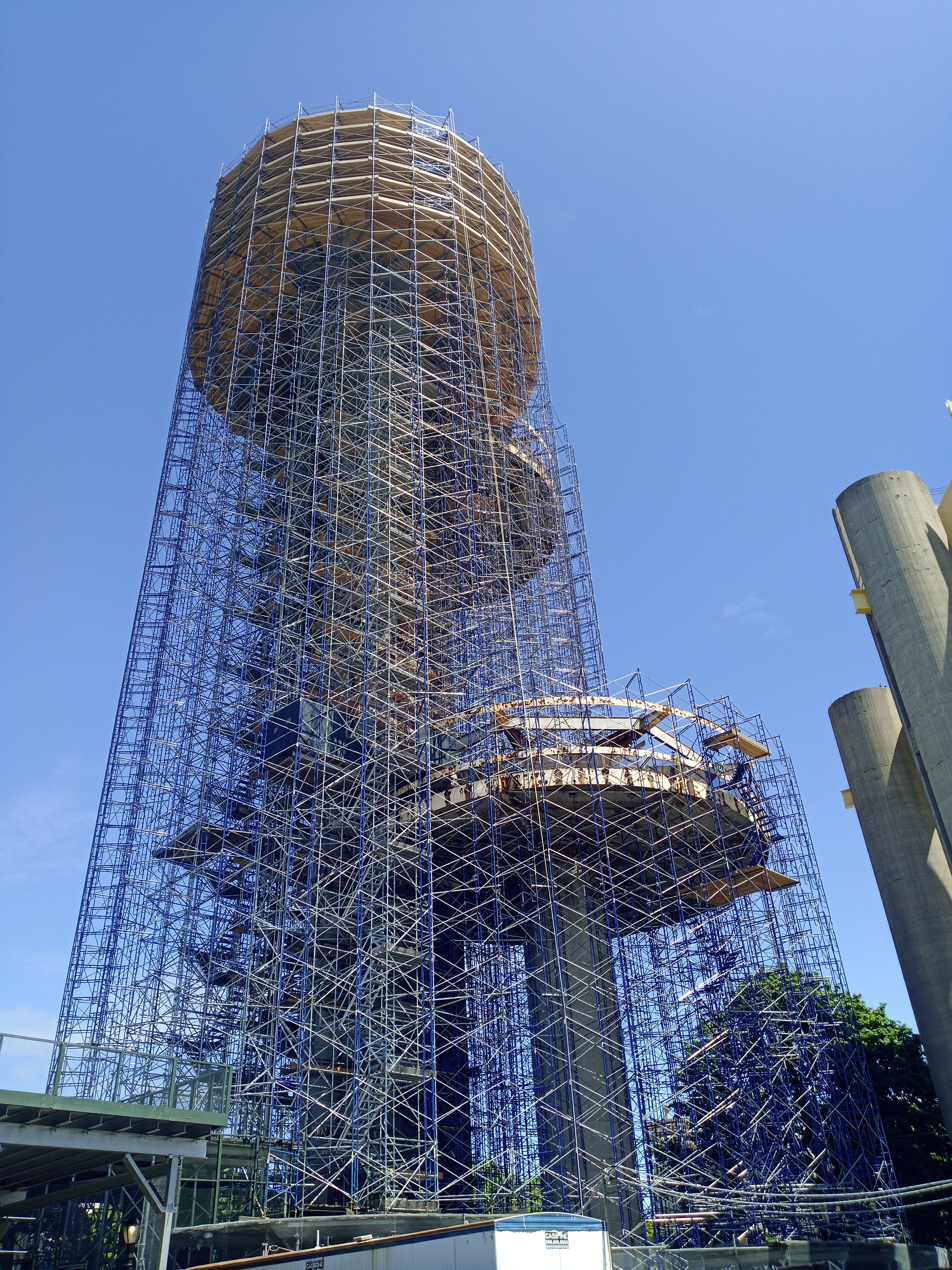
The observation towers being renovated in 2024

The city announced in May 2017 that it would spend $14.25 million on the New York State Pavilion. Katz and Mayor Bill de Blasio each allocated $6.45 million in taxpayer monies, while the other $800,000 was allocated by the New York City Council. The project was to include stabilization, waterproofing, electrical upgrades, and new lighting. In addition, as part of the Cities Project, Heineken organized an Indiegogo fundraiser, seeking to raise $15,000 to restore the Tent of Tomorrow's terrazzo floor. The fundraiser ultimately raised $40,000. Meanwhile, the city government began looking for a contractor to restore the pavilion in early 2018. The city had trouble hiring a contractor; by July, only two companies had submitted bids for the restoration of the pavilion. That December, the Federal Emergency Management Agency provided $16.5 million to fix damage that had been caused in 2012 by Hurricane Sandy.

The city government announced in September 2019 that it would begin renovating the three towers and the Tent of Tomorrow; at the time, the design phase was supposed to be completed in early 2020. Work on the project started in November 2019. Jan Hird Pokorny Associates designed the renovation, while the engineering firm Silman was the main engineer. As part of the project, the original electrical wiring was replaced to accommodate a mobile command center for the New York City Police Department. The suspension cables in the Tent of Tomorrow, the drainage system, and the floor of the pavilion were also replaced. In addition, the lighting was restored, the stairs in the towers were renovated, and the concrete was replaced. Originally, the work was supposed to be finished in early 2021, but the first phase of the project was not completed until April 2023.

The Tent of Tomorrow and the towers were illuminated at night starting in 2023, when the first phase of the restoration was finished. The New York Landmarks Conservancy gave its Lucy G. Moses Preservation Award to the first phase of the restoration. By that October, workers had begun repairing the towers as part of a second phase of the renovation, which was planned to be completed in late 2025. The project completion date was subsequently postponed to October 2026.

== Description ==
Attractions and geographical features of Flushing Meadows–Corona Park
Attractions and geographical features of Flushing Meadows–Corona Park:
1 Citi Field
2 Etihad Park (under construction)
3 Flushing Meadows Carousel and Queens Zoo
4 Flushing Meadows Corona Park Aquatics Center
5 Flushing River and Creek
6 Meadow Lake and Hong Kong Dragon Boat Festival
7 Metropolitan Park (planned) and Shea Stadium (demolished)
8 Mets–Willets Point subway station
9 Mets–Willets Point LIRR station
10 National Tennis Center and United States Pavilion (demolished)
11 New York Hall of Science
12 New York State Pavilion and Queens Theatre
13 Queens Botanical Garden
14 Queens Museum
15 Queens Night Market
16 Terrace on the Park
17 Unisphere
18 Willow Lake
19 World's Fair subway station (demolished)

The New York State Pavilion consists of three reinforced concrete-and-steel sets of structures: the Tent of Tomorrow, observation towers, and Theaterama. The Tent of Tomorrow is at the center of the site, the observation towers are to the northwest, and the Theaterama is to the northeast. The pavilion was primarily designed by the architectural partnership of Philip Johnson and Richard Foster. The structural engineer Lev Zetlin is credited with designing the Tent of Tomorrow's roof.

=== Site ===
The pavilion is in the central section of Flushing Meadows–Corona Park. It is northeast of the interchange between the Long Island Expressway and Grand Central Parkway, about 700 feet (210 m) from the LIE and 400 feet (120 m) from the GCP. The site, known during the World's Fair as Block 46, is surrounded by asphalt paths and lawns. North of the New York State Pavilion are the Unisphere, Queens Museum, Billie Jean King National Tennis Center, and Citi Field. Two World's Fair time capsules are buried near the pavilion, and there is a skatepark nearby as well.

The adjacent section of the park includes paved pathways centered around the Unisphere. During the 1964 fair, the federal and state exhibits were placed south of the Unisphere, while four other exhibition areas surrounded it. Block 46 was one of the largest plots of land in the federal and state section of the 1964 World's Fair. The pavilion is one of several structures from the 1964 fair that remain in Flushing Meadows–Corona Park, (Note: Other structures were relocated; see 1964 New York World's Fair pavilions#Remaining pavilions.) along with the Unisphere, Queens Museum, Terrace on the Park, and the New York Hall of Science.

=== Tent of Tomorrow ===
The Tent of Tomorrow is elliptical and measures either 240 by 320 feet (73 by 98 m), or 250 by 350 feet (76 by 107 m) across. The Tent of Tomorrow is surrounded by sixteen reinforced concrete columns. The columns are variously cited as measuring 98 feet (30 m) or 100 feet (30 m) tall. There are slots for beams within each of the columns. When the 1964 World's Fair was open, the tops of each column contained two flags, each displaying the names of counties in New York. There were also catwalks leading to the flagpoles.

==== Main level and mezzanine ====
The main floor of the tent had a large-scale Texaco highway map of New York state, made of 567 terrazzo panels. Each panel weighed 400 pounds (180 kg). The panels covered a total area of 9,000 square feet (840 m^{2}), and the map had dimensions of 130 by 166 feet (40 by 51 m). The top of the map faced east. Letters denoted various towns and cities, ranging in size from 2 to 12 inches (51 to 305 mm) based on how large the municipality was. There were also motifs of stars, which measured 5 inches (130 mm) across and were made by Texaco. Following severe damage due to neglect and vandalism, the original terrazzo was replaced with a layer of methacrylate starting in 2019. A small number of the original terrazzo tiles have been preserved. Several small planters were originally also placed around the map.

A mezzanine surrounds the main floor. This level has an asphalt floor, blue spherical lamps, steel railings along its inner and outer perimeters. Stairs lead up to the mezzanine from the western and eastern sides of the main floor, and there is a third staircase and an escalator from the northern entrance. There are no stairs leading outside of the Tent of Tomorrow.

The wall around the main floor, below the mezzanine level, was composed of red and white panels made of steel or canvas, although they have since been replaced with concrete blocks. There were originally also exhibit spaces under the mezzanine. At the main level, there are entrances from the north, west, and east; all of these are closed off. In the early 1990s, a 125-seat rehearsal room for the Queens Theatre was added within part of the former exhibit space.

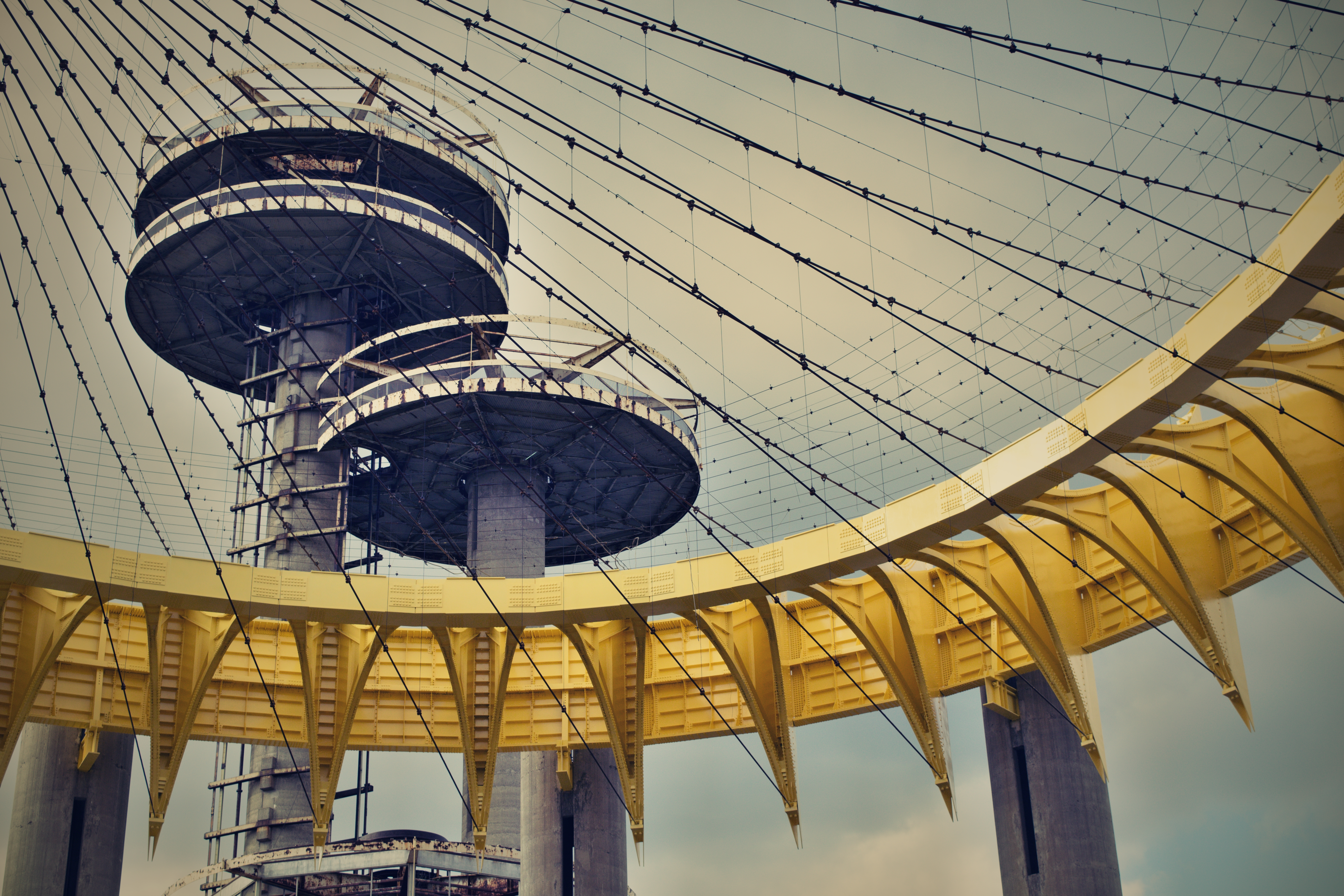
The tent's outer and inner girders; the outer girder contains "battle axe"–shaped plates, to which the cables are mounted. The observation towers are in the background.

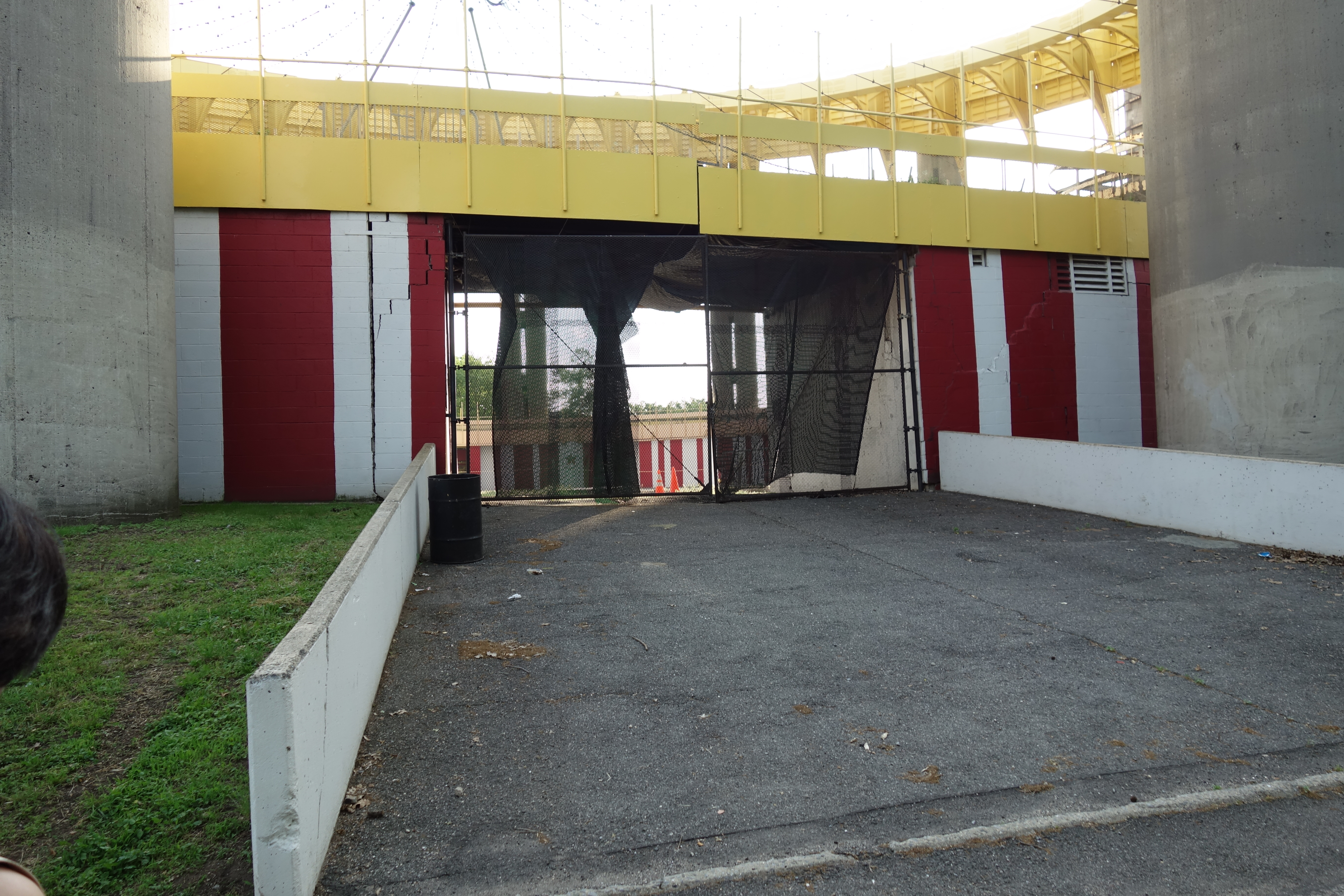
Entrance to the Tent of Tomorrow

==== Cable roof ====
The columns at the tent's exterior support a cable suspension roof weighing 2,000 short tons (1,800 long tons; 1,800 metric tons). Designed by Zetlin, the cable roof was based on a similar roof at the Utica Municipal Auditorium in Utica, New York. The roof was intended to eliminate the need for internal columns while remaining stable in high winds, and it was also much lighter than comparable roofs, at 9 pounds per square foot (44 kg/m^{2}; 0.43 kPa). The roof is 50,000 square feet (4,600 m^{2}) or 55,000 square feet (5,100 m^{2}), and, at the time of construction, was described as the largest cable suspension roof in the world. When the pavilion was erected, cable-suspended roofs could not be built in other parts of New York City, but the World's Fair was exempt from New York City building code. The city's building code was changed in the mid-1960s, allowing the pavilion to retain its roof, as well as new cable-suspended roofs elsewhere in the city.

The cable roof consists of 48 pairs of cables. Each cable measures 2.5 inches (6.4 cm) thick. The cables support a tension ring at the center, which originally had a plastic dome. Near the outer edge of the roof are two elliptical girders; the outer girder is thicker than the inner girder. The outer girder contains web plates shaped like battle axes, onto which the ends of the cables are mounted. A pair of cables is mounted to each web plate, with one cable each connected to the top and bottom, and there are smaller vertical stringers connecting the top and bottom of each pair of cables. The outer girders are connected to the reinforced-concrete columns by steel brackets.

The entire roof was covered by multicolored translucent plastic panels, which were fastened to the cables. The plastic panels were manufactured in one shade of blue and three shades of red. In total, there were 1,400 or 1,500 panels. There were also 800 spotlights mounted above the panels.

=== Observation towers ===
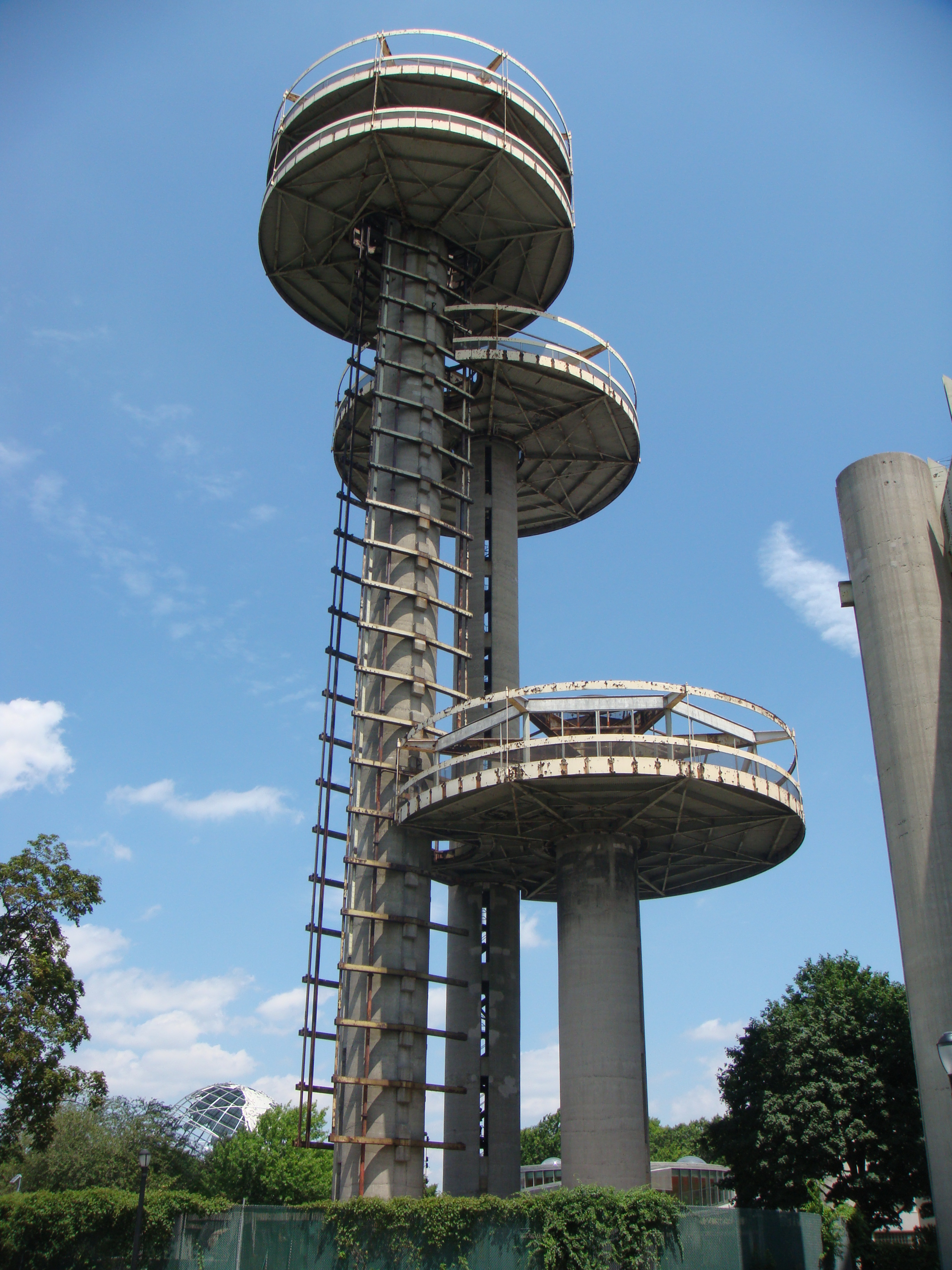
The observation towers in 2009

There are three concrete observation towers. The towers have similar widths and materials, differing primarily in their heights and the number of decks. The south tower measures 60 feet (18 meters), the north tower is 150 feet (46 meters), and the west tower is 226 feet (69 meters) high. The shortest tower was a dignitaries' lounge, and the mid-height tower had concession stands. The tallest tower was also the highest structure at the World's Fair; its height is restricted by the presence of LaGuardia Airport nearby. On clear days, visitors could see large parts of the New York metropolitan area and the Atlantic Ocean from the tallest tower.

The towers rise from a single, circular base made of concrete, surrounded by a concrete enclosure. Originally, there was a railing and lighting along the enclosure; a chain link fence was added around the enclosure after the fair closed. There is also a disused ramp at the western end of the enclosure, which provided access to the bases of each tower.

Each observation tower is supported on a reinforced concrete column with steel stairways inside. Each tower's column measures 12 feet (3.7 m) across at its base. Vertical slits divide each column into two sections of equal size, and horizontal beams connect each half of each column. The tallest tower has observation platforms which were once accessed by two "Sky Streak" capsule elevators attached to the tower. One elevator was a local elevator that served the other two towers, while the other elevator ran nonstop from ground level to the tallest tower. The elevator shafts are located opposite each other: the nonstop elevator was on the western side of the tallest tower, while the local elevator was to the east. The elevator shafts were removed in 2008, but there are steel tracks in each elevator shaft, which remain in place.

Each tower has roof beams, which extend outward from a central pillar; the decks of each tower are suspended from the roof beams. Each tower's deck is made of steel, with a concrete finish. The northern and southern towers have indentations to accommodate the elevator on the tallest (western) tower. The western tower has a double deck with a staircase connecting the two levels, as well as a transparent wainscoting. Originally, each tower had a ceiling composed of roof tiles within an aluminum grid, and there were also metal window and door frames. There was also air-conditioning equipment in the southern tower. The towers' roof beams, along with large portions of the decks themselves, still survive, while other parts of each tower (like interior finishes) have been removed. When the 1964 World's Fair was open, there were blue lights atop the roofs and along the central columns of each tower, as well as under the roof of the northern tower. As of 2023, the towers are illuminated by multicolored lighting at night. Due to Federal Aviation Administration requirements, the tallest tower also has an aviation obstruction light.

=== Theaterama ===
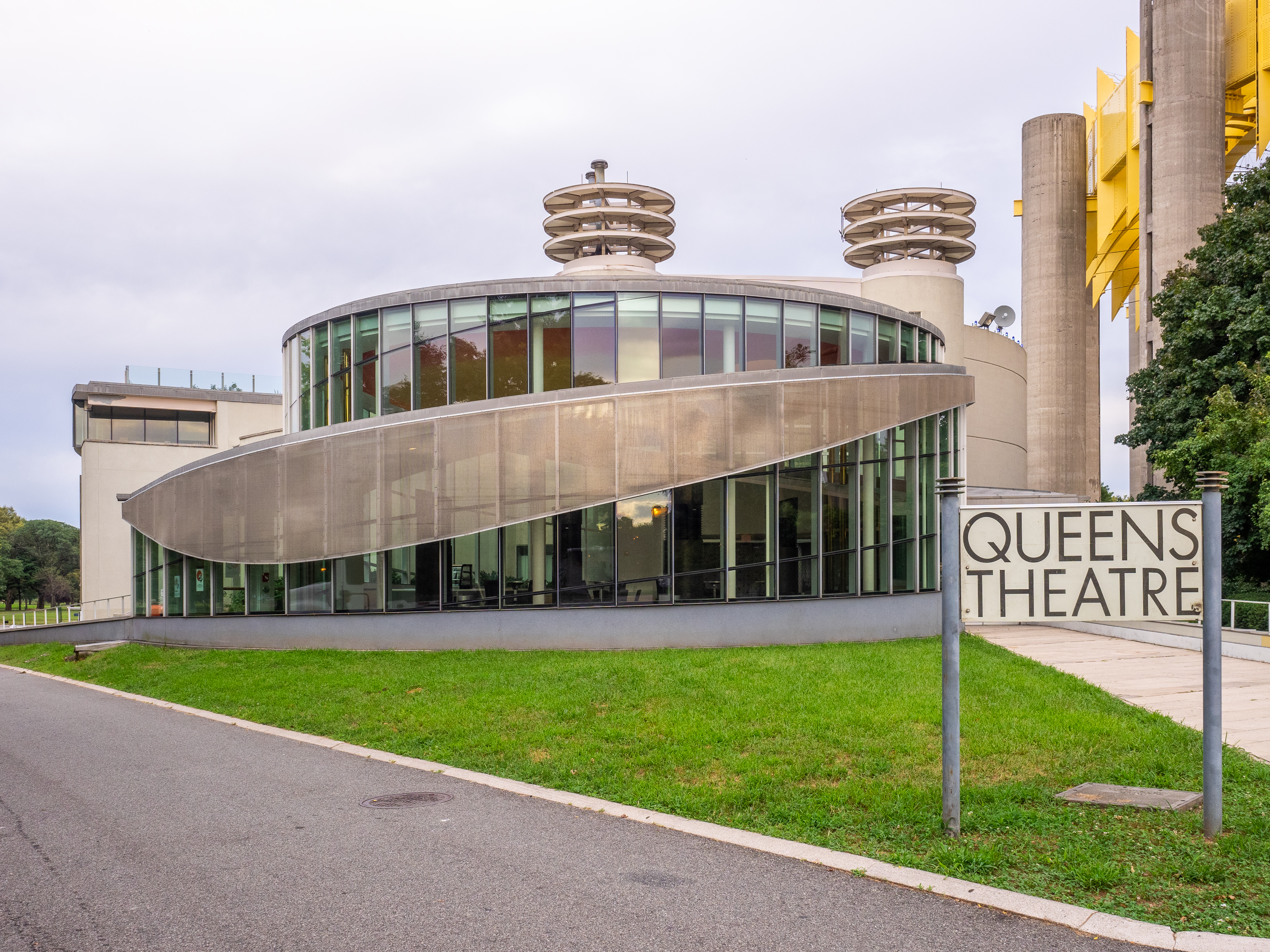
The Queens Theatre, occupying the former Theaterama

The original part of the Theaterama is a reinforced-concrete cylindrical structure, which measures 100 feet (30 m) across and 44 feet (13 m) high. This structure surrounds a reinforced-concrete "inner drum", which holds the main auditorium. Since 1989, the Theaterama has housed the Queens Theatre, a performing arts center that produces theater, dance, and children's and cultural programming.

==== Exterior ====
The theater building's facade originally contained rectangular openings at ground level, which have been variously infilled with masonry or glass bricks. The exterior was originally wainscoted with steel beams. There were three doorways to the building on the western facade. Between the window openings were medallions with an outline of New York state's borders. Above the medallions were yellow-and-white lamps, some of which still exist in the 21st century. To the southeast was a brick-paved terrace, accessed by a concrete stairway that descended to a lower-level gallery.

On the upper stories are setbacks around the perimeter of the structure, which double as service walkways. The Theaterama was originally topped by a wooden dome. Globe-shaped blue lamps were placed around the dome as well. The wooden dome was covered with an aluminum dome in the early 1990s, upon which the blue globe-shaped lamps were removed.

After the Theaterama was converted into a venue for the Queens Theatre, three structures were added to the original cylindrical massing during the early 1990s and late 2000s. A lobby with a glass-brick facade was built in the 1990s renovation. It is accessed by a doorway to the northwest, which is flanked by a pair of concrete pylons. The pylons flank a segmental arch, and there are lamps with metal tiers at the top of each pylon. Another cylindrical annex was built in the 2000s by the firm of Caples Jefferson. This annex, known as the "nebula", is located northwest of the relocated main entrance and contains a flat roof, as well as a glass facade with a diagonal ramp-shaped structure around it. There are also a pair of two-story structures to the north, which have a concrete facade. These structures contain offices and performance spaces. The larger structure is to the east and contains a terrace on its western facade, as well as sash windows.

===== Exterior artwork =====
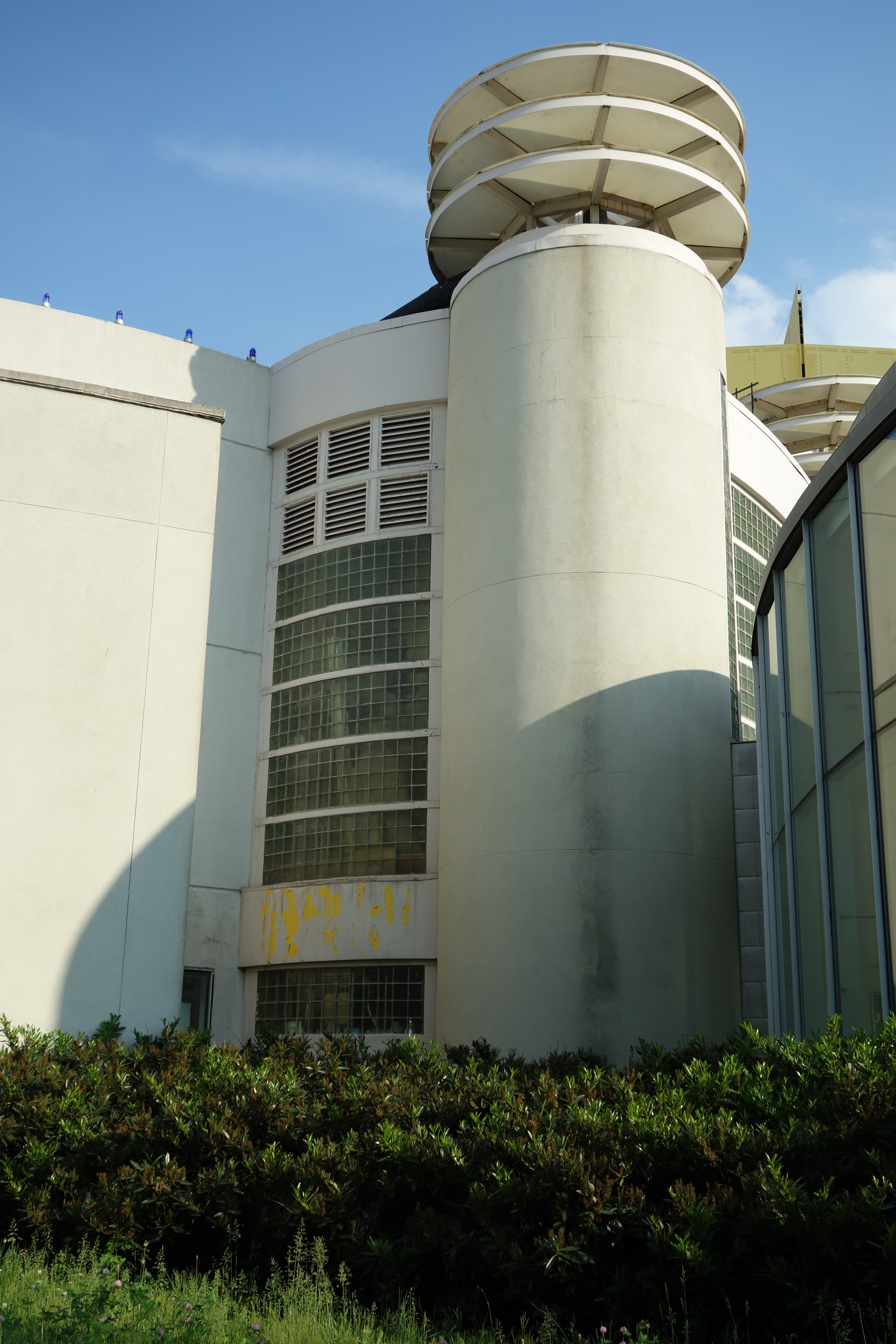
One of the pylons at the Queens Theatre's entrance

Ten artists were hired to design art for the Theaterama, which was mounted outside the building, above the first story. The muralists Robert Indiana, Roy Lichtenstein, James Rosenquist, and Andy Warhol; the sculptors Peter Agostini, John Chamberlain, Ellsworth Kelly, Alexander Lieberman, and Robert Mallary; and the graphic artist Robert Rauschenberg each designed one work of art. Each of the artworks occupied a space 20 by 20 feet (6.1 by 6.1 m). Some of the notable artworks included a car's crushed fender by Chamberlain, a comic strip-style work by Lichtenstein, a combine painting by Rauschenberg, and a mural by Indiana that spelled out the letters "Eat". The lights on Indiana's "Eat" mural were turned off because some visitors mistakenly believed that they could actually eat there.

The most contentious artwork was Warhol's mural Thirteen Most Wanted Men, which featured silkscreened mugshots of gangsters. (Note: The New York Times described Warhol's mural as depicting 13 people on the FBI Most Wanted Fugitives list, and the Pittsburgh Post-Gazette also characterized the murals as depicting FBI fugitives. Robert A. M. Stern and the co-authors of his 1995 book New York 1960 write that the mural depicted 22 people on the New York City Police Department's most wanted list, plus three blank squares, in a 5×5 grid.) Warhol's mural was removed before the fair opened, though there is disagreement on why. A 1964 New York Times article said Warhol requested the removal himself. Later versions of the story cite interference from government officials, including fears that Italians would not vote for Rockefeller in the 1966 New York gubernatorial election, or that state officials were worried about lawsuits. Supposedly as retribution for the removals, Warhol created silkscreened portraits of Robert Moses, to which Johnson objected.

==== Interior ====
The modern theater is accessed through the "nebula" annex. The nebula contains a reception space with a curved ceiling (which is painted yellow with red edges) and a skylight. There are windows around the reception area, which overlook the other pavilion structures. The nebula also includes a 75-seat cabaret room, a catering space, and back of house functions. Within the original structure, a circulation corridor runs between the facade and the "inner drum". The original entrance to the theater's main auditorium, a red oak door, is still extant. There are two mezzanine levels with walls made of concrete masonry units and plain concrete. On the second story is a projection booth for the main auditorium. When the theater was built, steep staircases led from the eastern side of the ground-level corridor to the mezzanines.

The inner drum of the theater contains the main auditorium, officially known as the Claire Shulman Playhouse since 2002. During the 1964 World's Fair, the auditorium was used to display 360-degree films, and there were wooden battens on the wall, which were intended to help with navigation within the auditorium. Following a 1972 renovation by Peter Howard, the main auditorium was converted into a 500-seat venue with a partial thrust stage. The seating area was reconfigured into 14 rows. The existing seats were replaced in 1993 with red velvet seats, salvaged from a former Loews cinema in Manhattan. After Caples Jefferson renovated the theater in 2009, the main auditorium was expanded to 600 seats. The modern main auditorium has a catwalk, acoustic wall panels, and raked seating. Parts of the inner drum wall have been removed to accommodate the stage.

The theater's lower level had exhibition space for visual art, as well as service rooms, during the World's Fair. The exhibit space had a coffered ceiling and wall partitions, parts of which are still extant in the 21st century. Offices, rehearsal space, and offices were built below the auditorium in the 1972 renovation; the office space was located in the southeastern portion of the lower level. Part of the lower-level space became a 100-seat lower auditorium for experimental theater in 1993. The lower auditorium was expanded to 125 seats following the 2009 renovation, and an elevator to the northeast was added around the same time.

== Impact ==
=== Reception ===
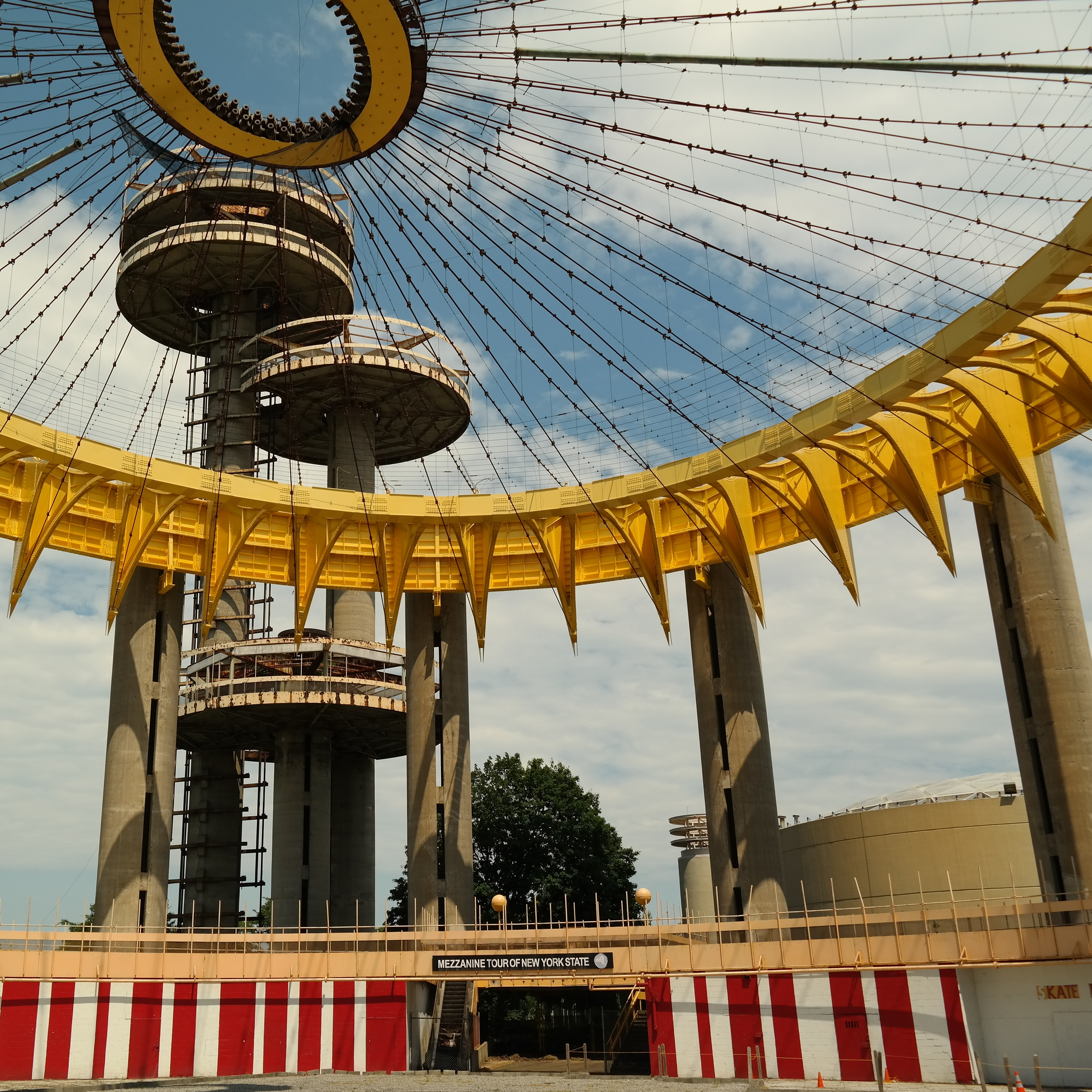
The interior of the Tent of Tomorrow, seen in 2017. The observation towers are in the background.

When the 1964 World's Fair opened, Ada Louise Huxtable of The New York Times wrote: "The runaway success, day or night, is the New York State Pavilion, a sophisticated frivolity by Philip Johnson, seriously and beautifully constructed. This is 'carnival' with class." In a later article, Huxtable praised the pavilion's carnival-like architecture but questioned whether its design fit with that of the fair's other structures, such as the Hall of Science. Max Kozloff, writing for Nation magazine, compared the pavilion favorably with the New York State Theatre despite regarding the towers and Tent of Tomorrow as kitschy. A reviewer for Art News praised the art at the New York State Pavilion, although Craft Horizons wrote that these were among the relative few artworks at the fair. The Prestressed Concrete Institute also gave the structures an award in 1964, describing the towers as creating an "atmosphere of fantasy" while retaining their structural integrity. Conversely, Time said that, although Johnson's Lincoln Center designs had received praise, he "deserves no such cheers for his New York State Tent of Tomorrow and its flanking circular observation towers".

The New York State Pavilion became an unofficial landmark of Queens after the World's Fair, even before it was added to the NRHP. In 1988, the art historian Robert Rosenblum quoted another writer as saying that the pavilion was "both grandly serious and ironic at the same time". Christopher Gray of The New York Times wrote in 1990 that the pavilion, "for all its size, had an appropriately gay, gaudy character", despite the discrete characteristics of the theater, tent, and observation towers. Writing retrospectively in his 1995 book New York 1960, Robert A. M. Stern wrote that "the pavilion was so seductively garish that only hard-core purists could resist its fun-loving spirit." The next year, Stern cited the New York State Pavilion as one of 35 modern-style buildings that he thought should be designated as city landmarks.

David W. Dunlap described the New York State Pavilion in 2001 as "a modern Colosseum, its columns towering over a thick pine grove". That year, Herbert Muschamp described the structure as "a double agent of a building", which combined standard elements of modern architecture with more whimsical elements such as the Tent of Tomorrow's roof, the observation towers' elevators, and the Theaterama's avant-garde art. By the mid-2000s, the pavilion's deterioration led one writer to say: "If this was built to evoke the future, then may the gods have mercy on us all". Another writer described the towers as having "a distinctly apocalyptic aura". Verena Dobnik of the Associated Press wrote in 2014 that the buildings were "sleek, Space-Age visions of the future" when they opened. Paul Goldberger wrote for Vanity Fair magazine the same year that the New York State Pavilion was one of the 1964 World's Fair's more memorable structures, along with the IBM, Spanish, and U.S. Rubber pavilions.

=== Media ===
The New York State Pavilion has been used as a setting for movies and TV shows. For example, the Tent of Tomorrow's interior was used as a filming location for the 1978 film The Wiz and a 2009 episode of the TV series CSI: NY. The pavilion's exterior was used as a setting in the 1997 film Men in Black, in which the towers were presented as disguised flying saucers. The Universal Studios Florida attraction Men in Black: Alien Attack includes replicas of the observation towers. The pavilion was also used as a filming location for the 2010 film Iron Man 2, where the structure was used as an exhibit for Stark Industries. The pavilion was the subject of a documentary by Matthew Silva, Modern Ruin: A World's Fair Pavilion, which premiered in 2015.

Since the early 1990s, the New York State Pavilion's ledges, steps, and fountain grates have been utilized by skateboarders and featured in skateboarding videos. The artist Gary Simmons depicted the abandoned pavilion in his 2009 mural Reflection of a Future Past, where he drew the pavilion with blurred lines to signify the themes of "erasure and memory". Additionally, a picture of the pavilion was used for the cover of a 2002 monograph about Johnson's work, and Christian Kellberg's 2010 book The New York State Pavilion: An Enduring Landmark detailed the pavilion's history. Kellberg wrote another book about the pavilion in advance of the World's Fair's 50th anniversary in 2014.

== See also ==
- 1964 New York World's Fair pavilions
- List of towers
- National Register of Historic Places listings in Queens, New York
