= Lev Zetlin =

- לב זטלין
- Born: July 14, 1918; Namangan, Russia
- Died: December 4, 1992 (aged 74); Milwaukee, Wisconsin, U.S.
- Education: High Technical Institute; Cornell University, M.S. & Ph.D.
- Occupations: Structural engineer; civil engineer; forensic structural investigator; professor
- Notable work: Utica Memorial Auditorium; New York State Pavilion; Roosevelt Island Tramway
- British military service
- Allegiance: United Kingdom
- Branch: British Army
- Service years: 1941–1943
- Conflict: World War II
- Israeli military service
- Allegiance: Israel
- Branch: Israeli Air Force, Haganah
- Service years: 1948–1950
- Rank: Captain
- Conflict: 1948 Arab–Israeli War

Lev Zetlin (Hebrew: לב זטלין; July 14, 1918 – December 4, 1992) was an Israeli-American civil and structural engineer. Founder of the engineering consulting firm Lev Zetlin & Associates, he developed several innovations in structural engineering including the double layer bicycle wheel roof system which he first employed at the Utica Memorial Auditorium and later patented. Zetlin was the structural engineer on 14 pavilions at the 1964–65 New York World's Fair including the New York State Pavilion which utilized his double layer cable suspended roof design.

Born in Russia, Zetlin began his career in Israel and moved in 1950 to New York to earn his master's and doctorate from Cornell University. After starting Lev Zetlin & Associates in 1956, he designed a number of structures that attracted the attention of architects such as Philip Johnson with whom he had a collaborative career. At various times during his career, Zetlin was a professor at Manhattan College, Pratt Institute, and the University of Virginia. Later in his career, he founded Zetlin-Argo Structural Investigations and consulted on several notable structural failure investigations.

== Early life, education and military service ==
Lev Zetlin was born in Namangan, Russia, on July 14, 1918. His family intended to move to Palestine in 1921 due to the Russian Civil War by way of Iran, where Zetlin received his early education at the American College in Tehran, Iran. He attended high school and university in Palestine. In 1939, he graduated with a diploma in civil engineering from the High Technical Institute (now Technion) in Palestine. He matriculated at the City and Guilds College in London, England, before being commissioned in the British Army from 1941 to 1943. Zetlin was later commissioned as a captain in the Israeli Air Force from 1948 to 1950 and fought in the 1948 Arab–Israeli War as a company commander in the Haganah, overseeing the construction of transmission towers and other war-related structures.

In 1950, Zetlin moved to the United States to attend Cornell University and graduated in 1951 with a master's in civil engineering. The university invited him to remain as a research associate and work towards a doctoral thesis. He earned his Ph.D. in structural engineering, applied mechanics and soil mechanics from Cornell in 1953.

== Career ==
=== Early career ===
In 1944, Zetlin started a solo engineering consulting firm in Tel Aviv. Until 1948, he worked for Israel's Department of Agricultural and Industrial Settlements as chief structural engineer while maintaining his independent consulting practice which he continued to operate until 1950.

After earning his doctorate, Zetlin served as assistant professor of civil engineering at Cornell University from 1953 to 1955. He also briefly worked for the Ammann & Whitney firm in New York City where his first project was designing hangar structures at John F. Kennedy International Airport.

=== Lev Zetlin & Associates and academic career ===
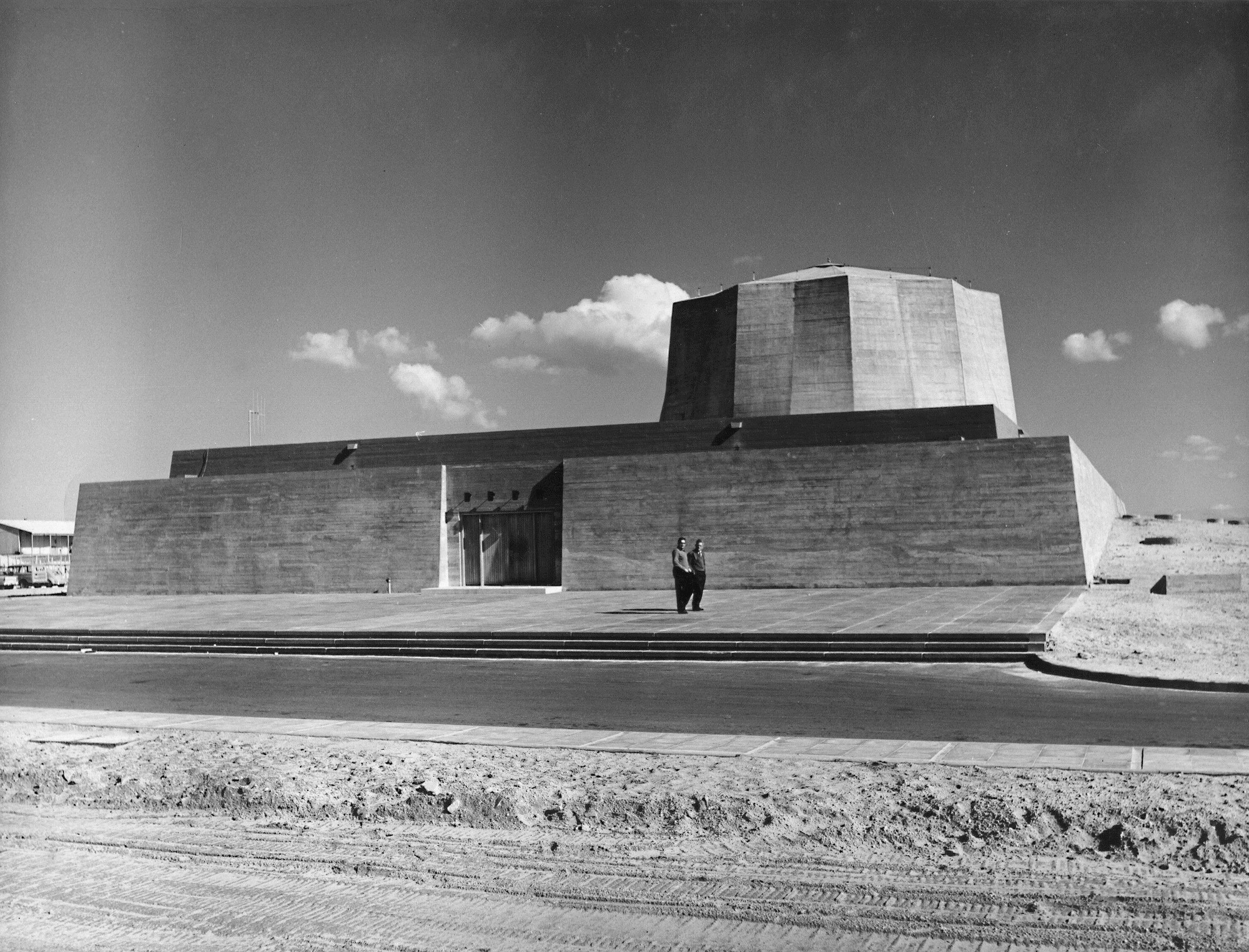
Soreq Nuclear Research Center

In 1956, Zetlin founded Lev Zetlin & Associates (LZA), an engineering consulting firm in New York City, and the same year began teaching advanced structures at the Engineering School of Manhattan College. In 1961, he joined the Pratt Institute in Brooklyn, where he served as professor of civil engineering until 1967. Zetlin served as a consultant on research for Union Carbide beginning in 1964 and was also a member of the board of consultants in civil engineering for Manhattan College in 1965. Further, Zetlin was on the advisory board of the General Services Administration, an independent federal agency, and served on the advisory panel of the National Academy of Sciences. He was later chairman of the board of trustees at Manhattan College and served on the New York State Council on the Arts.

In 1967, he became professor of architecture and civil engineering at the University of Virginia (UVA). He concurrently led the Interdisciplinary Center for Research and Innovation in Building at UVA.

In October 1971, he sold LZA to Gable Industries, owned by J. B. Fuqua, but remained active in the firm. By 1973, the firm was employing around 40 associates and was responsible for the structural design of airport terminals, bridges, high-rise apartments, hospitals, office buildings, offshore facilities, museums, schools and sports arenas. In 1977, the firm was sold to Charles Thornton and Richard Tomasetti, both former students of Zetlin and employees of LZA, who formed the firm Thornton Tomasetti.

=== Later consulting career ===
In the late 1970s, Zetlin started Zetlin-Argo Structural Investigations, a consulting firm which specialized in the forensic investigation of structural failures. The firm, based in West Palm Beach, Florida, was involved in a number of notable investigations. In 1979–80, Zetlin served on the board investigating the cracking in the concrete of the Olympic Stadium, built for the 1976 Summer Olympics in Montreal, Canada. His former firm, Lev Zetlin & Associates, and Zetlin himself were hired to look into the 1978 roof collapse at the Hartford Civic Center.

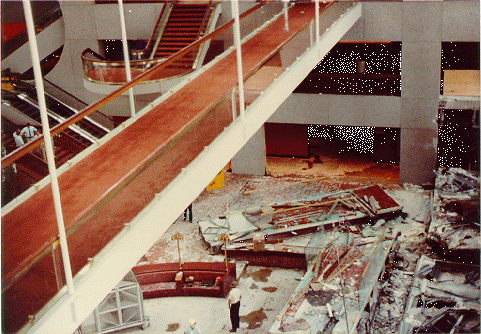
First day of the investigation of the Hyatt Regency walkway collapse

Zetlin later investigated the collapse of a walkway at the Hyatt Regency Hotel (Kansas City, Missouri) in 1981 that killed 113 people. In 1983, he investigated the Mianus River Bridge collapse on Interstate 95 in Connecticut and the roof collapse of the PATH station at Journal Square in Jersey City, New Jersey.

Zetlin was hired by The Detroit News in 1986 to evaluate the Zilwaukee Bridge construction project. Following his report in which he concluded that the bridge was unsafe and should not be opened, Senator Richard D. Fessler, chair of the Senate Transportation Committee of the Michigan Legislature, called for a hearing about the project. Zetlin's firm also investigated the L'Ambiance Plaza collapse in Bridgeport, Connecticut, in 1987.

== Structural designs and innovations ==
On his first project after receiving his Ph.D. in 1953, Zetlin designed a building for the Hadassah Medical Center in Jerusalem while working in the U.S. He developed a technique to allow vertical ducts to run along the columns of a flat-plate building by leaving openings in the concrete slab. While the area around columns is typically considered a weak point in the slab and would be further strained by an opening, Zetlin was able to overcome this issue by further reinforcing the area and utilizing the shear strength of concrete.

In the Utica Memorial Auditorium in Utica, New York, Zetlin faced the challenge of soft soil in the area, and he needed a building that was lighter than conventional structures. To accomplish this, he designed the structure with a roof suspended on two layers of cables. Zetlin's design for the 260-feet-span roof was constructed without any cranes or scaffolding. It was able to withstand aeroelastic fluttering because one set of cables pulls against the other, damping vibrations that could lead to catastrophic failures. This was the second building to employ a cable suspended roof, after the Dorton Arena, but the first to use the double layer bicycle wheel roof system. Zetlin obtained a patent on this self-damping cable system and used it on other buildings such as the Salt Lake County Civic Auditorium.

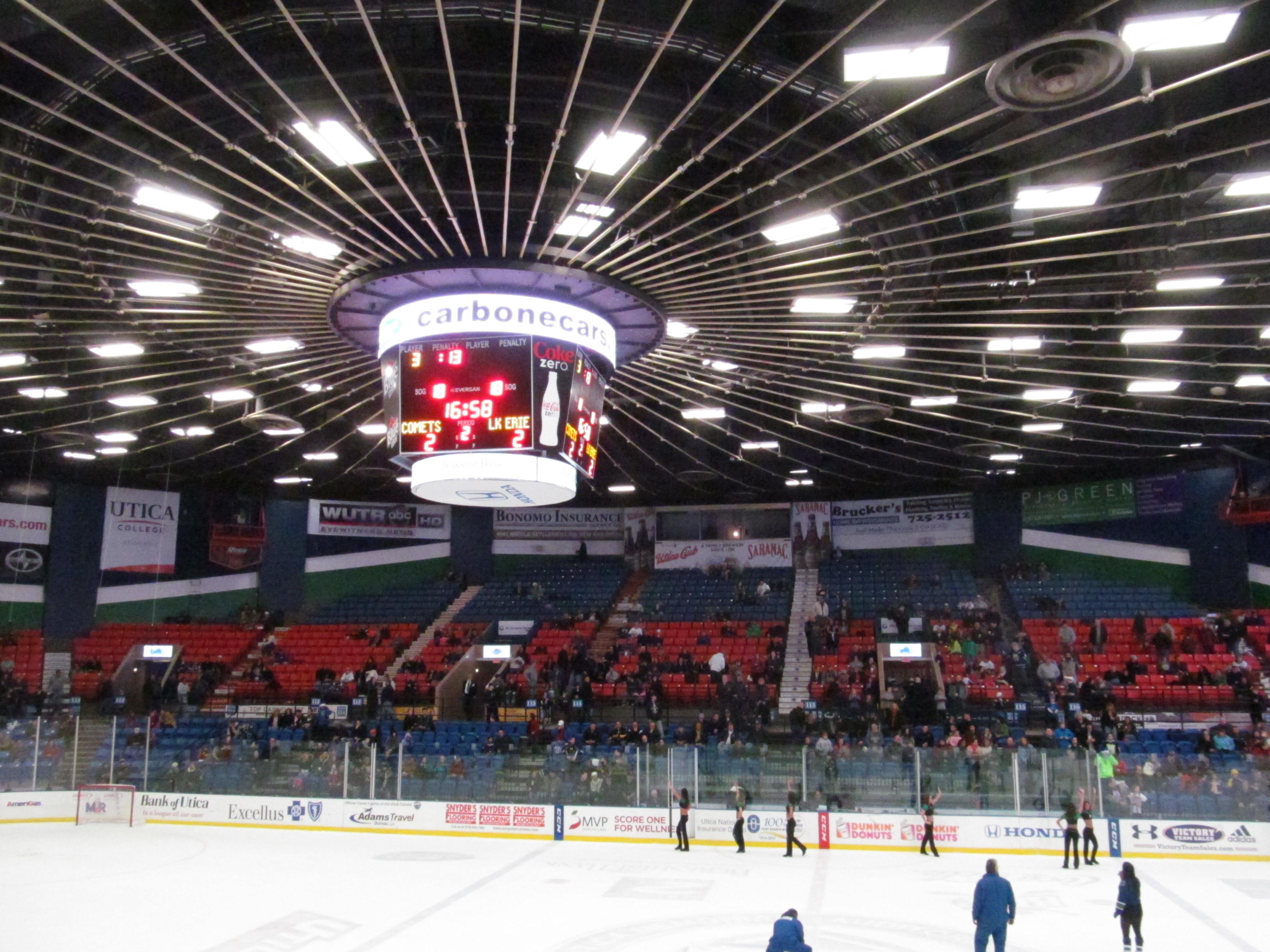
Utica Memorial Auditorium

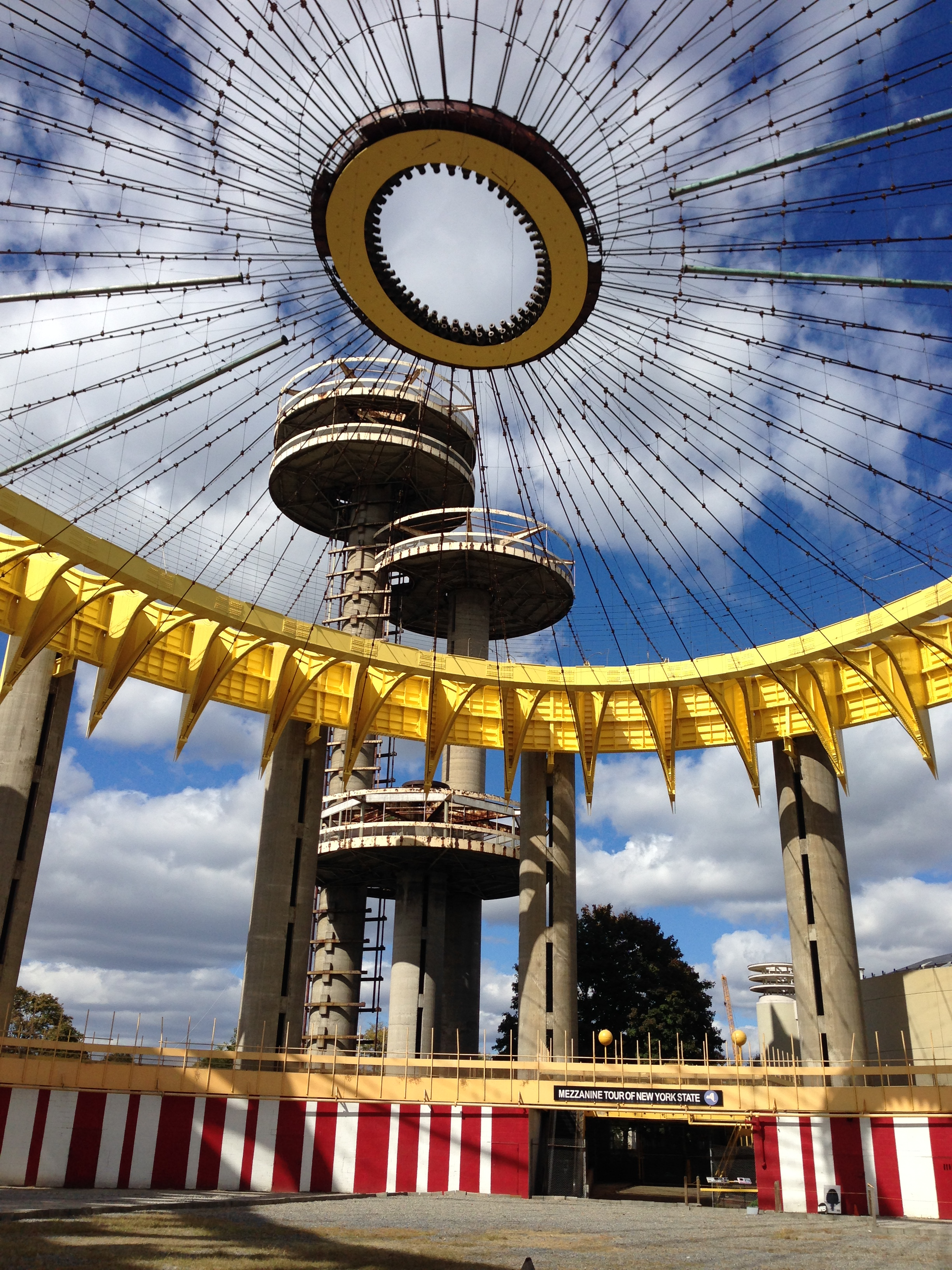
New York State Pavilion

The design of the Utica Memorial Auditorium attracted the attention of architect Philip Johnson. Together, they designed a nuclear reactor in Rehovot, Israel, in which Zetlin created a round building with a slightly curved roof instead of the typical "bosom" design used in nuclear reactors. Zetlin and Johnson also worked on several other projects together including an art museum in Utica, and the 1964–65 New York World's Fair, where Zetlin used the same double layer cable technique for the 350-foot (110 m) span of the New York State Pavilion. Johnson, who was the architect of the pavilion, said that Zetlin was "the best engineer I ever had – exciting, imaginative and reliable, a combination that's hard to get." Zetlin was the structural engineer for 13 other buildings at the fair. Among these was the Travelers Insurance Pavilion in which he used a set of boomerang-shaped frames and a tension belt of cables to create a structure in the form of an umbrella as in the company's logo. Zetlin was also the structural designer on the Kodak Pavilion for which he used a concrete shell of varying thickness to build the columns and cloud-like roof of the pavilion. On top of this roof structure was a walkway that led visitors along sculptured fountains, pools of water, and a tower featuring Kodak photographs.

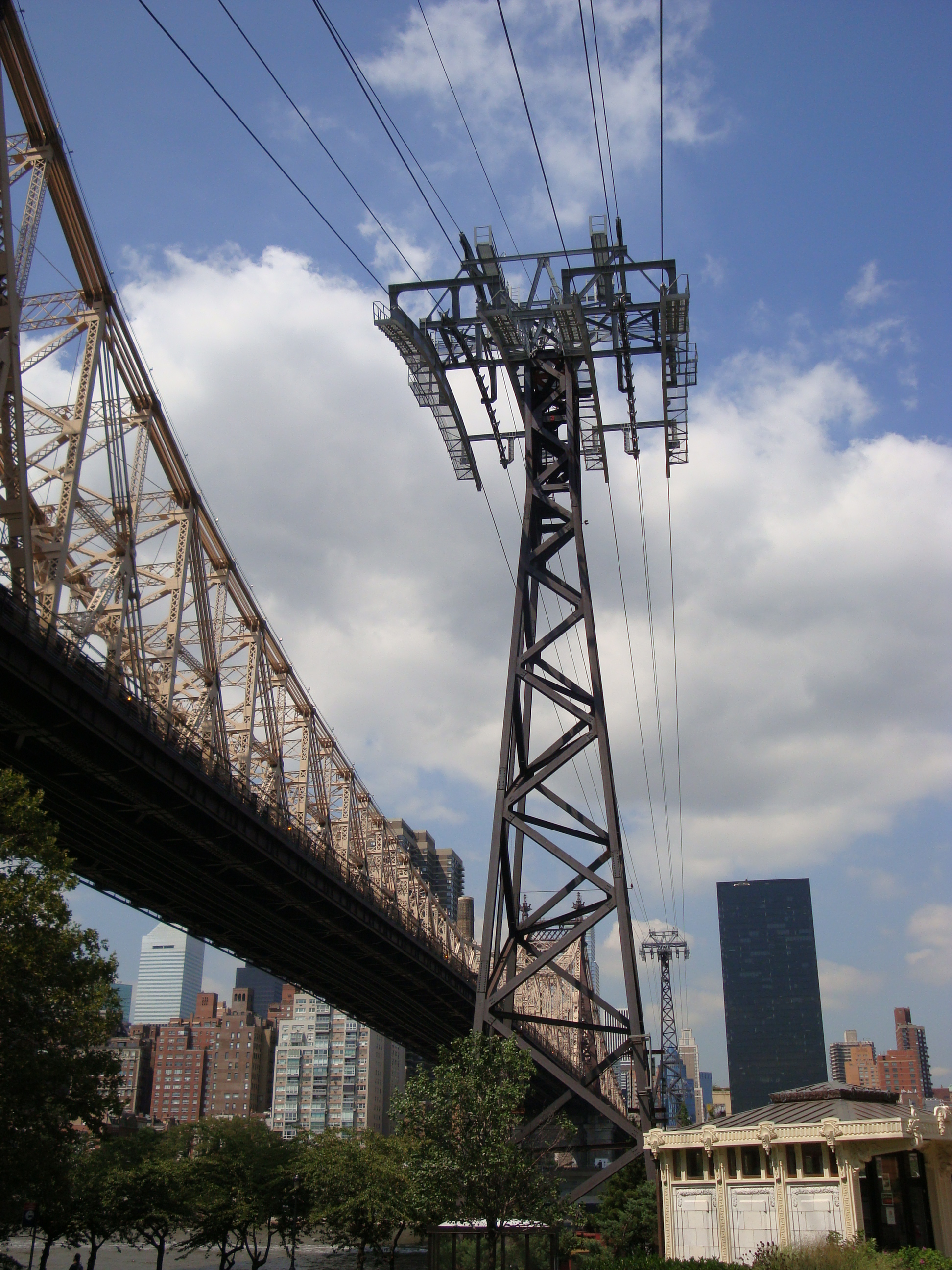
Towers of Roosevelt Island Tramway

Zetlin and Johnson worked together on several other projects including the Niagara Falls Convention Center which used eight steel, space frame trusses to span the 365-foot (111 m) roof. Zetlin collaborated with several other architects throughout his career. With Max Abramovitz, he designed the Krannert Center for the Performing Arts at the University of Illinois Urbana-Champaign. Among Zetlin's other works are the Roosevelt Island Tramway and several projects with architect I.M. Pei. Zetlin was also the structural designer of the Porat Yosef Yeshiva, a religious community in Old Jerusalem, designed by architect Moshe Safdie. Zetlin used precast arch segments of wall and floor structures that can be assembled to create spaces in a variety of shapes.

For the International Paper Company in 1970, he designed the Paper Bridge made out of paper and glue that allowed a 12,000 lb (5,400 kg) truck to drive over the bridge more than 40 times while spanning the 32 ft (9.8 m) over a gorge in the Valley of Fire State Park. The bridge weighing 9,000 lb (4,100 kg) is held by the Smithsonian Institution. Zetlin also designed a superbay hangar for American Airlines that could fit four Boeing 747s. By 1973, two such hangars had been built in San Francisco and Los Angeles. Several of Zetlin's bold designs have yet to be tested, including several creative designs for hangars, portable roof structures for aircraft, structures for underwater deep-sea exploration, and a reimagining of the Panama Canal with a suspension structure that would lift ships in their entirety and transport them over land.

== Awards and honors ==
Zetlin was elected to the Society of American Military Engineers in 1954 and became a fellow of the American Society of Civil Engineers in 1960. He was the recipient of the 1963 Progressive Architecture Award for his work on a medium security prison in Leesburg, New Jersey. He received the same award again in 1964 for his design of the Kline Science Center at Yale University. In 1964, the Concrete Industry Board honored Zetlin with a special award for the Eastman Kodak Pavilion at the New York World's Fair.

In 1969, Zetlin was awarded the Gold Medal from the Société Arts, Sciences, Lettres in France largely because of his work on the 1964–65 New York World's Fair. He has twice won the Honor Award from the U.S. Department of Housing and Urban Development first for his work on the Bluebeard's Hill Apartments in Saint Thomas, U.S. Virgin Islands, in 1968, and the Charles Center in Baltimore, Maryland, in 1970.

In 1972, Zetlin won the Architectural Award of Excellence from the American Institute of Steel Construction for his superbay hangar designs. He was made a Knight of Honor by the Sovereign Military Order of Malta in 1973.

== Personal life ==
Zetlin was married to Eve (née Shmueli) for 46 years. They had three children: Alexandra, Thalia, and Michael. Lev Zetlin died of cardiac arrest on December 4, 1992, at the age of 74, at St. Mary's Hospital in Milwaukee, Wisconsin. His funeral service was held in New York two days later.
