= Utica Memorial Auditorium =

Arena in Utica, New York, U.S.

Coordinates: 43.104982°N 75.233492°W

- The Aud
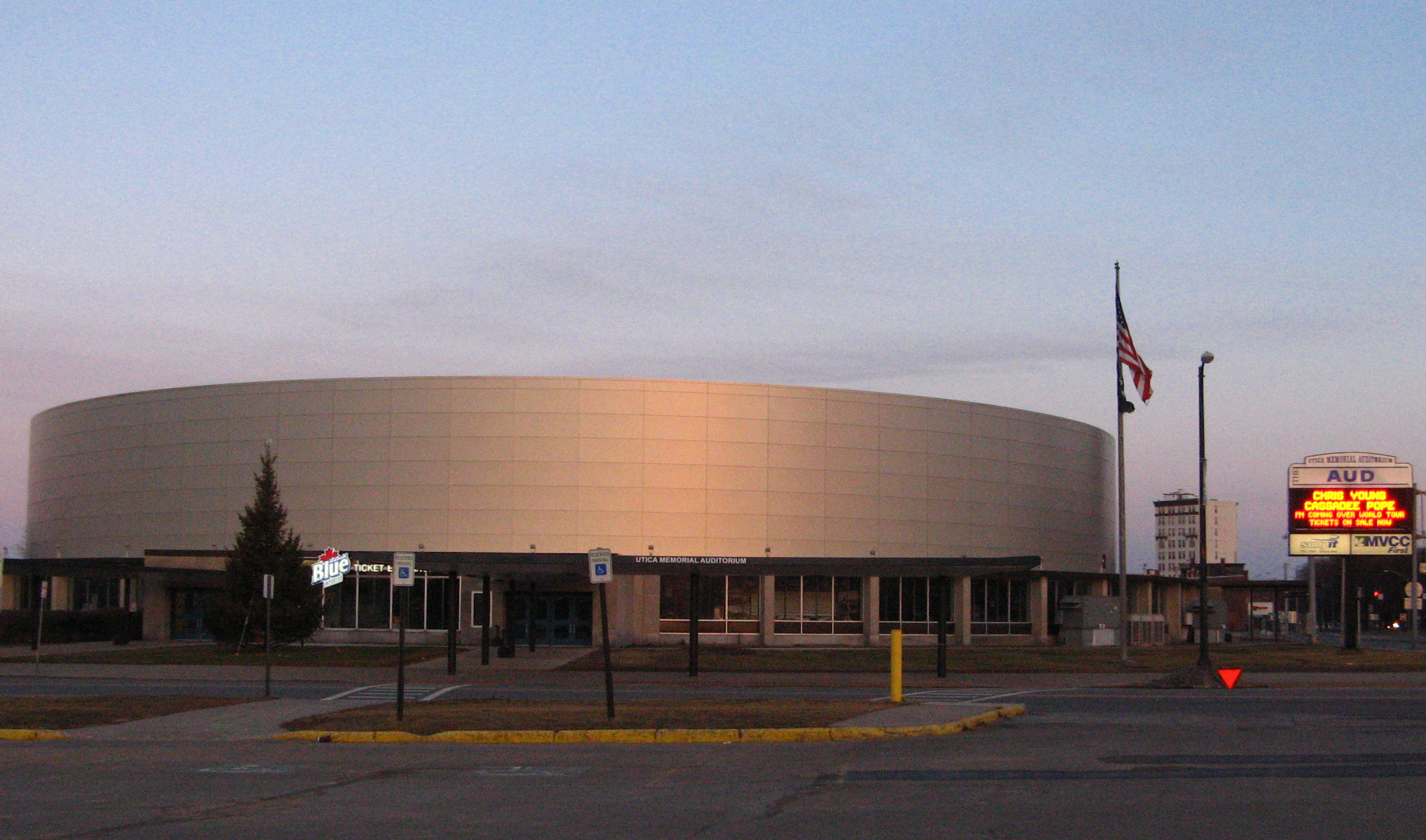
- Utica Memorial Auditorium in 2016 prior exterior renovations

- Location within New York Location within the United States
- Address: 400 Oriskany Street West
- Location: Utica, New York
- Owner: Upper Mohawk Valley Memorial Auditorium Authority
- Operator: Upper Mohawk Valley Memorial Auditorium Authority
- Capacity: 5,700 (floor events); 4,500 (basketball); 3,999 (ice hockey/indoor soccer)

Construction
- Groundbreaking: April 15, 1957
- Opened: March 13, 1960
- Cost: $4.5 million ($49 million in 2025 dollars)
- Architects: Gehron & Seltzer and Frank Delle Cese
- Structural engineer: Lev Zetlin & Associates

Tenants
- Utica Mohawks (EHL) (1978–1980); Utica Olympics (CBA) (1979–1980); Mohawk Valley Stars/Comets (ACHL) (1981–1987); Utica Devils (AHL) (1987–1993); Utica Blizzard (CoHL) (1994–1997); Mohawk Valley Prowlers (UHL) (1998–2001); Utica Comets (AHL) (2013–present); Utica City FC (MASL) (2018–present); Utica Jr. Comets (USPHL) (2019–2024); United Elite Krasjisnik FC (MASL2) (2023–2026)

Website
- Official website

The Utica Memorial Auditorium, known as NBT Bank Arena at the Utica Memorial Auditorium for sponsorship reasons, is a 3,999-seat multi-purpose arena in Utica, New York, with a capacity of 5,700 for concerts. Nicknamed "the Aud", it is the home arena of the Utica Comets, the AHL affiliate of the NHL's New Jersey Devils, Utica City FC of the Major Arena Soccer League, and Utica University's Men's Ice Hockey team. The arena along with the connecting Nexus Center, Utica City FC and Utica Comets are all currently managed by Mohawk Valley Garden.

In 2011, the Utica Memorial Auditorium was designated as a National Historic Civil Engineering Landmark by the American Society of Civil Engineers in recognition of its innovative cable suspended roof.

== History ==
The Utica Memorial Auditorium was conceived by then-Utica mayor John T. McKennan, who believed that the city needed a place for entertainment and sporting events. McKennan and the administration that he hired to plan out the process (led by Frank M. Romano) then hired Gilbert Seltzer, a well-known architect, to draw up plans for the building. A site was found along the old Erie Canal, and groundbreaking took place April 15, 1957. The arena was constructed using the world's first pre-stressed dual cable roof system, designed by Lev Zetlin (who would later partner with architect Philip Johnson to construct both the New York State Pavilion "Tent of Tomorrow" seen at the 1964 World's Fair and the Munson-Williams-Proctor Arts Institute, also located in Utica, NY) with "struts" between the cables. John A. Roebling's Sons Company developed the tensioning method for the project. Zetlin's design became the predecessor to the many modern dome designs seen today, and has since influenced many other tensile structures including Madison Square Garden. Seltzer would take the most pride in constructing "The Aud", saying, "This was the first successful use of cables for a roof structure."

"The Aud" was also one of the first stadiums to have telescopic seats. Telescopic bleachers (the bleachers pulled out from below higher levels) were common in stadiums, but Zetlin requested more comfortable seating for the arena.

Work continued through 1958 and into 1959. When the auditorium was finally completed, it became one of just three arenas built without obstructed views. The arena opened on March 13, 1960, with the Greater Utica Industrial Exposition its first event, running three evenings from March 16–19. 96 exhibitors took part in the presentation which drew an attendance of some 45,000.

In 2011, the Utica Memorial Auditorium was designated as a National Historic Civil Engineering Landmark by the American Society of Civil Engineers in recognition of its innovative cable suspended roof.

Photos and renderings of the Utica Memorial Auditorium are on permanent display at New York's Museum of Modern Art. The museum's collection honors the auditorium as an architectural landmark.

In 2015 two video boards were installed in the arena alongside other upgrades as part of a renovation package for the arena.

On September 27, 2017, the Upper Mohawk Valley Memorial Auditorium Authority announced a 10-year naming rights deal with locally based Adirondack Bank, amending the official name of "The Aud" to Adirondack Bank Center at the Utica Memorial Auditorium.

In November 2017, work was completed on the 26,000-square-foot expansion that added a new entrance, a half-dozen executive suites, a new women's bathroom, a building-wide sprinkler system and other amenities to the facility. The $10.55 million project was fully funded by the state. A restaurant named "72 Tavern & Grill" was constructed on existing foundation on the West side of the facility that supported underground areas of the Aud. The "72" is in honor of the 72 cables that have held up the roof of the Adirondack Bank Center for more than 50 years.

The Nexus Center, a new sports facility adjacent to the Aud and connected to it via an indoor walkway, was completed in 2022. It includes three playing spaces that can used for ice hockey or turf sports such as indoor soccer. The largest of these, having 1,200 seats, a Jumbotron screen, and multiple luxury boxes, is the home venue for the Utica University women's ice hockey team, the Utica Junior Comets, and the Utica Yeti Lacrosse team as of 2024. In 2023, Utica University purchased its naming rights, rebranding it the Utica University Nexus Center.

In December 2024 360 degree LED dasher boards covering the entire rink where installed at the arena, making it the first arena in North America to feature 360 degree LED dasher boards and one of only 7 arenas in the world to feather 360 degree LED dasher boards.

On September 10, 2026, the AUD Authority announced a new ten-year naming rights deal with NBT Bank, renaming the facility to NBT Bank Arena at the Utica Memorial Auditorium.

== Events ==
=== Hockey ===
The Aud was home to the Mohawk Valley Comets of the North American Hockey League, the Mohawk Valley Stars/Comets of the Atlantic Coast Hockey League, the Utica Devils of the American Hockey League, the Utica Blizzard, and Mohawk Valley Prowlers of the United Hockey League, the Mohawk Valley IceCats of the North Eastern Hockey League, the Utica Mohawks (EHL) (1978–1980), the Utica Olympics (CBA) (1979–1980), the Mohawk Valley Stars/Comets (ACHL) (1981–1987), and the Utica Bulldogs (CoHL) (1993–1994).

In 1962, it hosted the NCAA Division I Men's Hockey Championship (AKA the "Frozen Four"). The arena hosted the frozen 4 of the 2025 and 2026 NCAA Division III men's ice hockey tournament as well as 1st and 2nd round games. In 2017, the arena hosted the Division III "Frozen Four".

Scenes from the 1977 hockey film Slap Shot starring Paul Newman were shot at the auditorium. The original center-hung scoreboard, as seen in the movie, was unusual in that the game time was kept by a digital clock, while the penalty time was kept by analog clocks. This was eventually replaced by a center-hung scoreboard designed by Eversan, which includes a one-line messageboard.

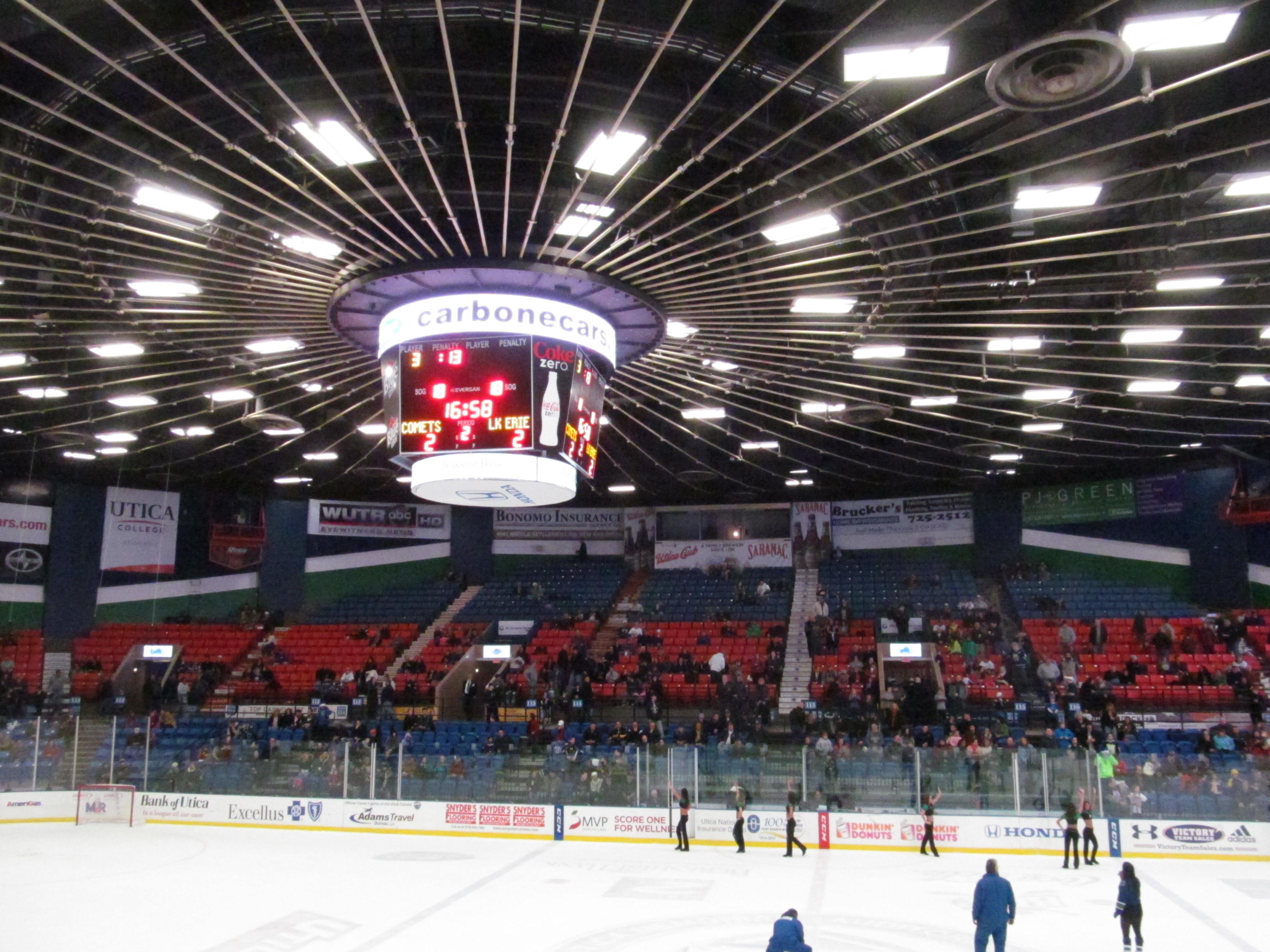
Interior of the arena prior to future renovations

On June 14, 2013, it was announced that the Peoria Rivermen, the AHL farm team of the National Hockey League's Vancouver Canucks would be relocating to the Utica Memorial Auditorium for the 2013–14 season as the Utica Comets. As the AHL has a strong presence in Western and Central New York State, the league agreed to the move, citing the move would further boost the league's strength in the Northeast while further cutting down on travel expenses. On October 23, 2013, the Comets played at "The Aud", losing 4–1 to the Albany Devils in front of a sold out crowd. Frank Corrado scored the first Comet goal on home ice.

In addition to the Comets, the auditorium plays host to the Utica University Pioneers men's and women's ice hockey teams that play in the United Collegiate Hockey Conference of the NCAA Division III, the Skating Club of Utica, the Jr. Comets youth hockey program and several high school varsity ice hockey teams. Both Pioneer hockey teams boast the highest average attendance for a Division III hockey team in the United States, with regular season games frequently selling out. The Utica Memorial Auditorium hosted the NYSPHSAA Ice Hockey semi-finals and finals every year from its inception through the 2015 Championships. In August 2015, NYSPHSAA announced it would be moving the state tournament to Buffalo's HarborCenter.

In recent years, "The Aud" has earned high rankings from hockey circles, earning the #8 spot in "The 10 Coolest Hockey Rinks in the World" list by Complex Magazine, the #8 rank for best AHL arena by Stadium Journey, and #4 in the Pure Hockey Blog's list of the top 6 places to skate for hockey.

The Professional Women's Hockey League (PWHL) held a five day evaluation camp at the Nexus Centre in December 2023 ahead of its inaugural season; all six PWHL teams participated. The 2024 IIHF Women's World Championship was held at the Adirondack Bank Center and Nexus Center from the 4th to 14th of April, with Canada winning the gold.

=== Other sports ===
On March 9–10, 1973, it hosted the 11th NYSPHSAA state wrestling tournament.

On June 1, 2018, the Adirondack Bank Center hosted UFC Fight Night: Rivera vs. Moraes.

On June 13, 2018, Mohawk Valley Garden CEO Rob Esche and Major Arena Soccer League (MASL) commissioner Joshua Schaub, along with other officials, announced that Utica will field a professional indoor soccer team — called Utica City Football Club, or UCFC for short — that will play home games at the Adirondack Bank Center at the Utica Memorial Auditorium beginning with the 2018–19 season. The team had previously been known as the Syracuse Silver Knights.

The 2024 World Lacrosse Box Championships were held at the Adirondack Bank Center and Nexus Center between September 20 and 29 2024. Canada won the Men's Championship, while the United States won the Women's championship.

=== Concerts ===
"The Aud" held a Santana concert on February 22, 1973 during their Caravanserai Tour, their only concert in Utica, and the arena has the distinction of being the location of one of the last scheduled Elvis Presley concerts. The concert was scheduled to be on Friday, August 19, 1977, three days after Presley's death on August 16.

The Grateful Dead played there four times - twice in March 1973, once in January 1979, and finally on March 13, 1981 - almost exactly eight years after their first appearance there.

Phish's performance at the Aud on October 20, 2010 was later released as the "Live in Utica" box set.

Sporting positions
Preceded by University of Denver Arena; Denver, Colorado	Host of the Frozen Four; 1962	Succeeded by McHugh Forum; Chestnut Hill, Massachusetts
Preceded by Herb Brooks Arena	Host of the Division III men's Frozen Four; 2017	Succeeded by Herb Brooks Arena
