= Richard Foster (architect) =

American architect

- Born: March 21, 1919; Pittsburgh
- Died: September 13, 2002 (aged 83); Wilton, Connecticut
- Occupation: Architect

Richard T. Foster (March 21, 1919 – September 13, 2002.) was a modernist architect who worked in the New York City area, and also around Greenwich, Connecticut. Foster is best known for his collaborations with architect Philip Johnson.

== Life ==
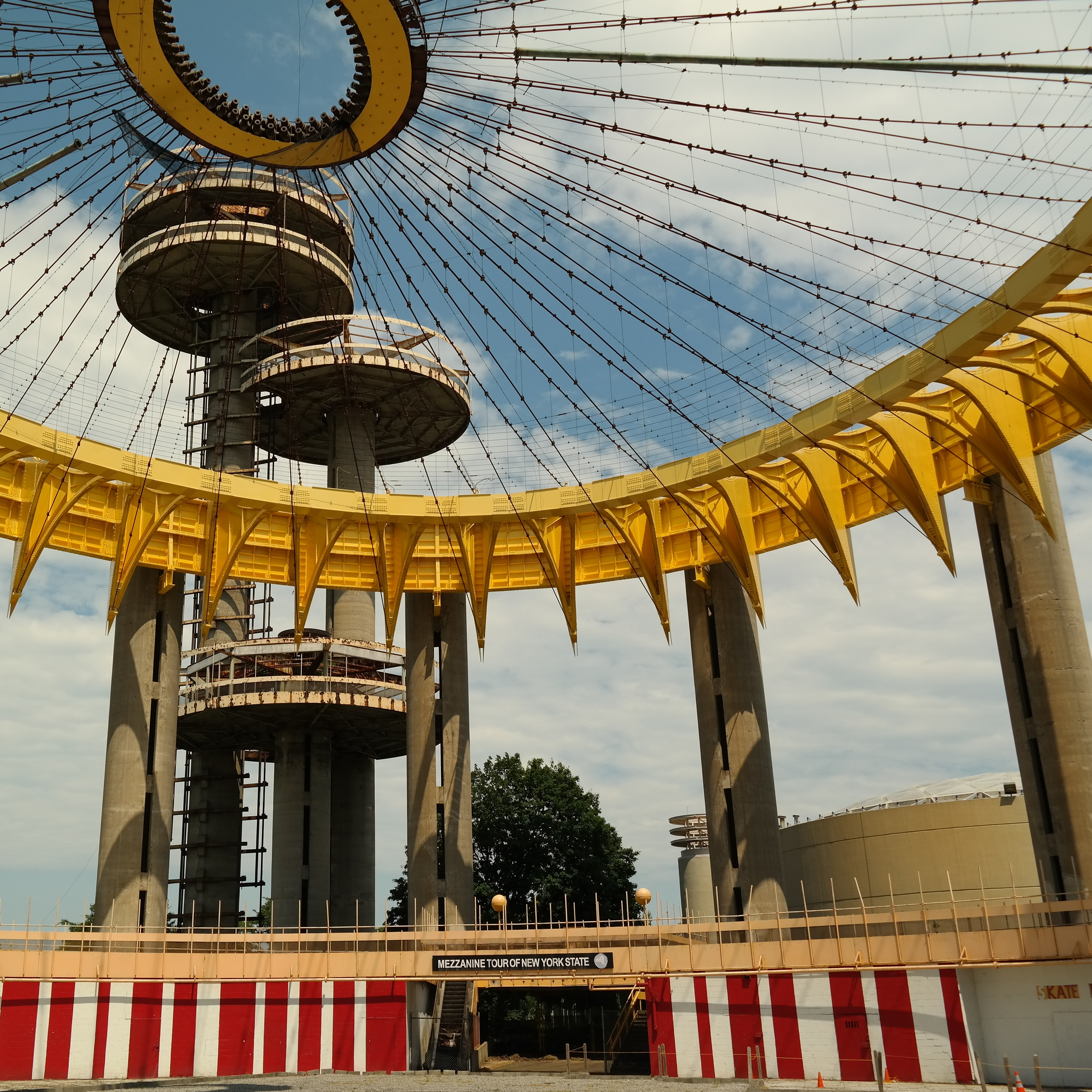
New York State Pavilion, 1964, NYC (seen in 2017)

Foster was born in Pittsburgh and educated at the Pratt Institute School of Architecture, graduated in 1950, and was hired into Philip Johnson's office directly out of school. Foster worked on the designs in Johnson's office of the 1950s, notably the Glass House located in New Canaan, Connecticut.

Foster left in 1962 to form his own firm, Richard Foster Associates, but as an independent architect returned to work on major projects with Johnson into the 1970s. His own designs included the Round House, a circular rotating house in Wilton, Connecticut, published in Popular Mechanics in 1968. Foster continued to work and live in Wilton until his death in 2002.

== Work ==
Foster's work includes:

- New York State Pavilion at the 1964 New York World's Fair, NYC (with Philip Johnson, 1962–64)
- Kline Geology Laboratory, Science Hill, Yale University, New Haven, Connecticut (with Johnson, 1963)
- New York State Theater at Lincoln Center for the Performing Arts, NYC (with Johnson, 1964)
- Kline Biology Tower, Yale University, New Haven, Connecticut (with Johnson, 1966)
- Kreeger Residence, now the Kreeger Museum, Washington D.C. (with Johnson, 1967)
- Circambulant House (or Round House) in Wilton, Connecticut (1968)
- Elmer Holmes Bobst Library at New York University (with Johnson, 1972)
- Tisch Hall at Stern School of Business (with Johnson, 1972)
- Hagop Kevorkian Center for Near Eastern Studies at New York University, NYC (with Johnson, 1973)
- Congregation Shaare Tova synagogue, Kew Gardens, Queens, NYC (1983)
