= Thirteen Most Wanted Men =

1964 mural by Andy Warhol

13 Most Wanted Men
- Artist: Andy Warhol
- Year: 1964
- Movement: Pop Art

Thirteen Most Wanted Men was a 1964 mural by American artist Andy Warhol. It was created for the façade of the New York State Pavilion at the 1964 World's Fair in Queens, New York. Comprising enlarged silkscreened mugshots of thirteen men drawn from a New York City Police Department booklet of criminal suspects, the mural was Warhol's only public work. Installed shortly before the fair's opening, Thirteen Most Wanted Men was abruptly painted over due to official objections, prompting enduring debate about censorship and public art. Warhol subsequently produced a series of 20 Most Wanted Men (1964) silkscreen paintings on smaller canvases with the same images he had used to make the mural.

== Installation ==
In 1962, Warhol and nine (originally ten) other artists were commissioned to create works to decorate 20 feet (6.1 m) square spaces at the New York State Pavilion at Flushing Meadows Park. The nine others were Peter Agostini, John Chamberlain, Robert Indiana, Ellsworth Kelly, Roy Lichtenstein, Alexander Liberman, Robert Mallary, Robert Rauschenberg, James Rosenquist; the tenth was Claes Oldenburg.

Architect Philip Johnson held the position of Arts Commissioner for the New York State Pavilion. He assigned Warhol the space outside of the Theaterama, a circular cinema 100 feet (30 m) in diameter. Intending to depict "something to do with New York", and taking inspiration from Marcel Duchamp's 1923 work Wanted, $2,000 Reward (in which Duchamp put his own photograph in a wanted poster), Warhol decided to print large-scale copies of images from a booklet published on February 1, 1962 by the New York Police Department, titled "The Thirteen Most Wanted," showing 22 head-and-shoulder mug shots of the wanted men. Silkscreens for the panels of the mural were created in early 1964, printed in silkscreen ink on Masonite panels, and the completed 20 feet (6.1 m) 5-by-5 square of front and side views (including three blank frames) was installed at the site by April 13. Warhol stated that the work cost $4,000 to create.

== Controversy ==
Government officials quickly objected to the images, and on April 16, 1964—less than a week before the fair was due to open—Philip Johnson, the pavilion architect, told Warhol that he must remove or replace the work within 24 hours. The stated reason was that the Governor of New York Nelson Rockefeller was concerned that the images—mostly depicting men of Italian descent—would be insulting to an important segment of his electorate. In an attempt to save face, Warhol and Johnson told reporters that Warhol himself had been dissatisfied with the work. The mural was obliterated with aluminum paint before the fair opened to the public. In his book Popism (1980), Warhol stated:

Philip gave me the assignment, but because of some political thing I never understood, the officials had it whitewashed out. A bunch of us went out to Flushing Meadow to have a look at it, but by the time we got there, you could only see the images faintly coming through the paint they'd just put over them. In one way I was glad the mural was gone: now I wouldn't have to feel responsible if one of the criminals ever got turned in to the FBI because someone had recognized him from my pictures. So then I did a picture of Robert Moses instead, who was running the fair—a few dozen four-foot squares of Masonite panels—but that got rejected, too.

Some critics have seen the monochrome silver 20 feet (6.1 m) square painted over the mural as a separate artwork, as a form of ironic comment on images of the "most wanted" men not being desired at the World's Fair. It could also be interpreted as a critique of abstract expressionism, as done by the artist constantly throughout his oeuvre, silencing the painting into abstract monochromy. Later commentators have also suggested that the title "wanted" bears a double meaning, referring to homosexual desire, with the mugshots rearranged so many of the men were looking at each other.

== Aftermath ==
In the summer of 1964, Warhol used the same silkscreens to create Most Wanted Men, a series of 20 smaller 48 by 40 inches (1.2 m × 1.0 m) diptych paintings on canvas. They were exhibited at the Sonnabend Gallery in Paris, and then in Cologne and London, in 1967-68. The work may have partly inspired two compilations made from his Screen Tests series of 16mm films, 13 Most Beautiful Women and 13 Most Beautiful Boys, made in 1964-5.

== Legacy ==
For the 50th anniversary of the World's Fair, the Queens Museum in New York put on an exhibition of related items from April to September 2014. The exhibition was mounted at the Andy Warhol Museum in Pittsburgh from September 2014 to January 2015.
