= Round House (Connecticut) =

Coordinates: 41°13′03″N 73°26′57″W

The Round House (or "Circambulant House") is a house in Wilton, Connecticut, built by architect Richard T. Foster in 1968. The building can rotate 360 degrees, providing every room a view of the landscape. It combines engineering from Germany, local Connecticut steel, and stone from the Dolomites. It was the Foster family’s primary residence for more than 35 years. Foster lived there until his death in 2002.

In 2012, Mack Scogin Merrill Elam Architects was hired to upgrade and adapt the structure to contemporary standards:

Scogin and Elam sought to "soften" the house by breaking up the geometries and by bringing nature into the interior. This begins as soon as one ascends the spiral stair in the house’s "trunk." The architects built a low wall around the floor opening so that—like a stage curtain prepped for a big reveal—a visitor’s first views are out to the undulating landscape, not the terrazzo floor.
