= Philadelphia City Rowing =

American youth rowing nonprofit in Philadelphia

- Abbreviation: PCR
- Formation: November 2009; 16 years ago
- Founder: Libby Peters
- Type: 501(c)(3) nonprofit
- Tax ID no.: 27-1522343
- Headquarters: 4017 Cambridge Street, East Parkside, Philadelphia, Pennsylvania, U.S.
- Location: Boatyard at Lloyd Hall, #1 Boathouse Row
- Region served: School District of Philadelphia
- Executive Director: Caitlin Mance
- Affiliations: Schuylkill Navy (affiliate), USRowing
- Revenue: $990,966 (2024)
- Staff: c. 21–24
- Website: philadelphiacityrowing.org

Philadelphia City Rowing (PCR) is an American nonprofit youth development organization in Philadelphia, Pennsylvania. Founded in late 2009 by the rower Libby Peters, it provides free rowing instruction, competitive crew programs, academic tutoring, college preparation, and wellness education to students attending School District of Philadelphia public and charter schools. The organization operates a boatyard at Lloyd Hall, #1 Boathouse Row, and an indoor training facility in the East Parkside neighborhood of West Philadelphia.

PCR was established to address the near-total absence of rowing opportunities for Philadelphia public school students in a city that has been one of the sport's historic centers in the United States. Rowing has long carried high costs and steep barriers to entry — the Philadelphia Inquirer reported in 2023 that participation could cost as much as $10,000 per student per year — and no School District of Philadelphia high school fields its own crew team.

In 2019, USRowing, the sport's national governing body in the United States, presented the organization with its Anita DeFrantz Award for advancing diversity in rowing. The organization has since received the NBCUniversal Local Impact Grant in 2025 and the Wawa Foundation Hero Award in 2026.

== History ==
=== Founding ===
Philadelphia City Rowing was conceived in 2009 by Libby Peters, then a 27-year-old international-level rower from Utica, New York. Peters rowed on scholarship at Columbia University from 2002 to 2006, serving as a co-captain, and went on to make the United States national team in 2008, finishing second at the Olympic trials and winning a bronze medal at the 2008 World Rowing Championships as stroke of the lightweight quadruple scull. She drafted the business plan for the organization while recovering from a cancer diagnosis.

Reporting by Melissa Dribben in the Philadelphia Inquirer in June 2010 credited Peters with originating the concept and recruiting the program's early collaborators. Columbia University Athletics has likewise described her as having founded the organization and served as its executive director. The organization's own materials, along with other sources, additionally credit two co-founders: Milton S. "Tony" Schneider and Catherine Reddick.

Sources differ on the founding year. PCR states it was founded in 2009 and began programming in the summer of 2010; the University of Pennsylvania athletics department dates the founding to November 2009; and Chalkbeat reported in 2012 that the program launched in 2009. IRS records list the organization as tax-exempt from April 2010, and a 2016 Inquirer article gave the founding year as 2010. These are generally reconciled as incorporation in late 2009 followed by the first season of programming in summer 2010.

The founders were responding to two overlapping conditions: budget reductions that had eliminated many after-school activities and sports teams across the Philadelphia school district, and a high school dropout rate among the worst in the country. Their premise was that Philadelphia's unusually deep rowing infrastructure — the Schuylkill River racing course, Boathouse Row, and the Schuylkill Navy, the oldest amateur athletic governing body in the United States — was almost entirely inaccessible to the city's public school students.

=== Founders ===
Libby Peters served as PCR's executive director and head coach until August 2011, when she returned to Columbia as an assistant women's rowing coach. She later became associate head coach of women's rowing at the University of Pennsylvania and subsequently held positions with the City of Philadelphia's commerce department. She was inducted into the Columbia University Athletics Hall of Fame in 2023.

Milton S. "Tony" Schneider, a Philadelphia real-estate executive and founder of the Glenville Group, serves as chair of PCR's board of directors. His other civic roles have included board chair of Mural Arts Philadelphia, inaugural board member of the Anti-Defamation League's regional operation, and at-large board member of the Jewish Federation of Greater Philadelphia. He was inducted into the Philadelphia Jewish Sports Hall of Fame in 2022, a citation that credits him with founding PCR in 2009.

Catherine Reddick, a finance professional at Mercator Advisors, took up rowing as a freshman at the University of Pennsylvania and won two medals at the 2011 Pan American Games — silver in the double sculls and bronze in the quadruple sculls — competing out of the Penn Athletic Club Rowing Association. She has served as a PCR board member and secretary, appeared on WHYY-FM's Radio Times in 2017 in a program on Boathouse Row, and has been involved in national efforts to broaden participation in the sport, including the Black Coaches and Rowers Association.

=== Early years ===
In its early years the organization was led by executive director Terry Dougherty, who appears in the organization's filings in that role from at least the 2013 fiscal year. Reporting from 2012 described a program operating on donated and borrowed resources: the school district contributed used shells it had originally obtained from Princeton University and stored for over a decade at the Navy Yard, and the Philadelphia Parks and Recreation Department provided the use of a fenced boatyard on Boathouse Row.

From the outset the program paired rowing with an academic eligibility requirement, and provided transportation support and food to remove practical barriers to attendance. By 2017 it combined on-water training with SAT preparation delivered by JEVS Human Services, tutoring from Drexel medical students, college essay workshops, and monthly nutrition instruction.

=== Expansion ===
Caitlin Mance was named executive director in July 2018, overlapping with Dougherty during a transition year. Mance rowed in high school for Narragansett Boat Club, was a varsity oarswoman and team captain at Cornell University, graduating in 2008, and subsequently rowed for Riverside Boat Club in Boston. She holds an advanced certificate from Community Rowing Inc.'s Institute for Rowing Leadership and previously managed foundation and corporate giving at that organization.

Under Mance the organization added an environmental education component built around the Schuylkill watershed, supported in part by the William Penn Foundation. George Rowley, who holds a bachelor's degree in psychology from Morgan State University and a master's in educational leadership from the University of Central Florida, joined as director of programs and community inclusion, having been introduced to the sport as a counselor at the City of Philadelphia's summer rowing camps.

In early 2023 PCR opened an indoor facility at 4017 Cambridge Street in East Parkside, in a building previously occupied by a towing company, giving the organization dedicated year-round space for ergometer training, classrooms, and offices for the first time.

Participation and revenue both grew substantially over the organization's first fifteen years. A 2016 Inquirer feature described roughly 80 members; by the 2023–24 school year the program served about 300 students on an annual budget of approximately $1 million. In 2025, NBC10 reported that the organization had worked with more than 5,000 students since its founding, and by 2026 PCR reported serving more than 400 students annually.

== Programs ==
PCR's programs are free and open to students in grades 7 through 12 attending a Philadelphia public or charter school. Participants come from more than 40 schools across the city.

- High school program. A year-round competitive team practicing five days a week from September through May, combined with tutoring, a college readiness curriculum, swim lessons, financial literacy instruction, and paid summer job placement.
- Middle school program. An introductory program for seventh and eighth graders meeting three days a week, blending on-water and land training with fitness, nutrition, and environmental education.
- Summer learn-to-row camps. Free multi-week sessions introducing the sport to new participants, with SEPTA passes and snacks provided daily. Swimming ability is requested but not required; non-swimmers wear life jackets on the water and are offered swim instruction.
- Enrichment and workforce development. The organization produces Rowing Pieces, a student-led podcast run as a media and communications internship in which participants book guests, write questions, and conduct interviews.

The program maintains an academic eligibility standard under which students whose grades fall below a set threshold do not row until they recover them. PCR reports that all of its graduating seniors finish high school on time and that 98 percent go on to post-secondary education; these figures originate with the organization and have been relayed in local news coverage.

== Facilities ==
PCR operates from two locations: an outdoor boatyard at Lloyd Hall, #1 Boathouse Row on Kelly Drive, and the indoor training facility on Cambridge Street in East Parkside. The boatyard's position on the river leaves the program particularly exposed to silting, a recurring problem that can keep its rowers off the water while better-resourced programs train indoors.

A subsequent adaptive-reuse project has been converting a former municipal parking garage in East Parkside into a larger headquarters combining a rowing gym, classrooms, and offices, alongside tenant space for a metal fabrication shop and a youth theater program operated by the Centennial Parkside Community Development Corporation. The architect, Lo Design, provided its services pro bono.

The organization is an affiliate member of the Schuylkill Navy rather than a full club member, a status shared with several other Philadelphia-area rowing organizations that do not occupy a Boathouse Row clubhouse.

== Competition ==
PCR crews race on the regional scholastic circuit, including the Stotesbury Cup Regatta, the Head of the Schuylkill Regatta, the Philadelphia City Championships, and the Manny Flick series. At the 90th Stotesbury Cup in 2016 the program entered seven boats, with its girls' junior eight finishing fourth in 5:10.60. In 2023 the organization entered 28 School District of Philadelphia students in the 53rd Head of the Schuylkill Regatta, the only district students in the field.

The organization also hosts its own indoor rowing competition, the Philadelphia Indoor Classic, held in 2025 and again on February 21, 2026 at the School of the Future on Parkside Avenue. The event pairs standard 2,000-metre racing with 500-metre sprint, 10,000-metre, half-marathon, and marathon ergometer events, drawing clubs and high schools from the Philadelphia region and the wider mid-Atlantic.

=== Alumni ===
A number of PCR participants have gone on to row collegiately, several returning to the program as coaches. Cypress Kaulbach, a graduate of Central High School, first rowed at PCR at seventeen, reached national championships in her senior year, and walked onto the University of Pennsylvania women's rowing team, competing at the NCAA Championships and earning recognition as a Collegiate Rowing Coaches Association National Scholar-Athlete. Kera McCarthy, who joined PCR as a middle school rower in 2016, coxed Thomas Jefferson University's varsity eight at the 2023 NCAA Division II championships and to a silver medal at the Dad Vail Regatta, later returning to coach at PCR. Sebastian Gonzalez led a PCR novice four to a Philadelphia City Championship title before rowing four years at Temple University, winning gold in the junior varsity four as Temple took the 2023 Dad Vail points trophy. Other alumni, including Myi Harte, Seth Lopez, and Michaela Donnelly, have returned to the organization as coaches and staff.

== Funding ==
The organization is privately funded and raises its full annual budget each year, receiving no operating support from the city, the school district, or the state; contributions have accounted for approximately 99 percent of its revenue. It does receive in-kind support from public partners, including donated equipment from the School District of Philadelphia and the use of the boatyard site from Philadelphia Parks and Recreation.

Reported revenue grew from $209,893 in the 2013 fiscal year to $990,966 in fiscal 2024, with expenses of $959,550 and net assets of $636,444 in the latter year. The organization posted a deficit in fiscal 2023, when revenue of $570,654 was outpaced by $874,009 in expenses.

Foundation and corporate support has included multi-year funding from the William Penn Foundation tied to watershed access and environmental education, proceeds from the Head of the Schuylkill Regatta's 2020 virtual racing, and grants from the Dad Vail Regatta Organizing Committee. PCR is a registered Educational Improvement Organization under Pennsylvania's Educational Improvement Tax Credit program.

== Recognition ==
- 2019 — Anita DeFrantz Award, USRowing, recognising an individual or organization achieving measurable success in expanding diversity in rowing. The award was presented at USRowing's annual convention, held that December in Philadelphia. USRowing renamed the honour the United We Row Award in 2025, reassigning the DeFrantz name to its highest award. Earlier recipients of the diversity award include Row New York in 2011, RowLA in 2012, and the Chicago Training Center in 2013.
- 2025 — NBCUniversal Local Impact Grant, $40,000, as one of six Philadelphia-area recipients.
- 2026 — Wawa Foundation Hero Award, $50,000, awarded July 2, 2026 following a public vote. Three runners-up — Inspiring Minds Philadelphia, Safe-Hub Philadelphia, and the Urban Youth Racing School — each received $10,000.

== See also ==
- Row New York
- Boathouse Row
- Schuylkill Navy
- Rowing (sport)
