= The Illinois Record =

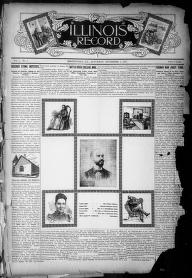
- The Illinois Record on November 6, 1897
- Type: Weekly newspaper
- Founder: A.V. Broady
- Founded: October 31, 1897
- Ceased publication: April 15, 1899
- Headquarters: 226 ½ South Fifth Street
- City: Springfield, Illinois
- Country: United States
- OCLC number: 10601352

The Illinois Record was an African American newspaper published in Springfield, Illinois. Its first publication was on October 31, 1897, although the digital record begins with the second issue, dated November 6, 1897. The last publication was on April 15, 1899. The newspaper was published weekly on Saturdays and operated from 226 ½ South Fifth Street. A. V. Broady was the founder and the first editor of the newspaper. Government official and statistician Charles E. Hall served as editor for most of the paper’s existence from December 11, 1897, through April 15, 1899, when the newspaper ended. The newspaper calls for collective action among its readers in Sangamon County, arguing that "If our people would unite their forces for the good of their race instead of wrangling over leaderships, some good might be accomplished." The paper describes itself as politically aligned, stating, "We are Republicans, and expect to do our fighting in the party and not out."
