= Charles E. Hall =

American government statitician

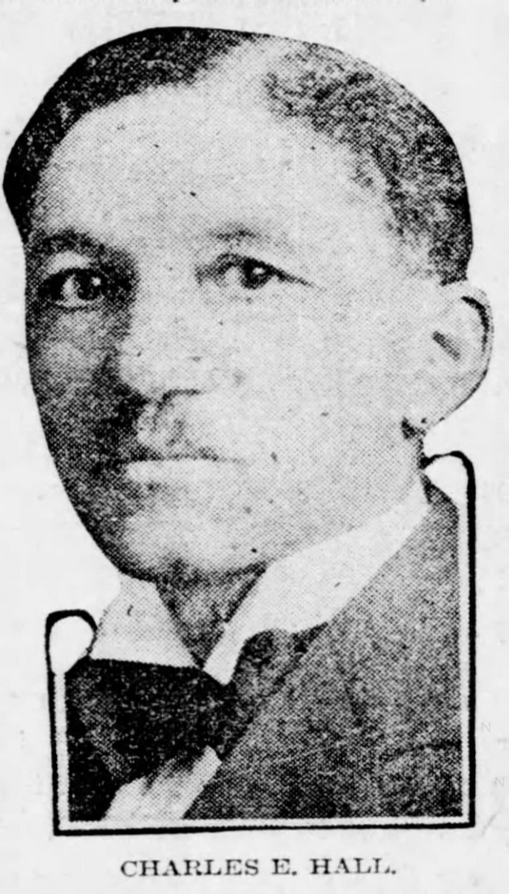

Charles Edward Hall (May 22, 1868 – September 29, 1952) was a government official in the United States and an expert statistician.

He was born in Batavia, Illinois the son of Reverend Abraham Thompson Hall, the first licensed African to preach in Chicago, and Joanna Huss Hall, a community activist. He had 11 siblings. He attended public schools and then business college in Spokane, Ohio and at Wilberforce University in Ohio.

Hall was the first non white to be appointed to be a senate committee clerk in the Illinois Senate. He worked as the managing editor of the Illinois Record from 1897 to 1898, and in 1900 was appointed as a clerk in the United States Census Bureau. He worked in the United States Department of Commerce and Labor for the census bureau for a period and was known as an expert statistician. In 1935 he was promoted to a new position of Specialist in Negro Statistics that was created for him. By 1938 he had worked for 38 years in the bureau and was described as an essential part of Franklin D. Roosevelts New Deal.

Hall authored The Negro In the United States in 1930, and Negroes in the United States, 1920-1932 published in 1969. He also wrote a 165 page pamphlet in 1905 called "Pottery and the Clay Products of the United States".

He died September 29, 1952 at the home of Dr. Lloyd A. Hall, his nephew, in Chicago.
