= Lloyd Hall =

American chemist (1894–1971)

- Born: Lloyd Augustus Hall; June 20, 1894; Elgin, Illinois
- Died: 2 January 1971 (aged 76); Pasadena, California
- Education: Northwestern University, University of Chicago
- Spouse: Myrrhene Newsome
- Parent(s): Augustus Hall; Isabel Hall
- Scientific career
- Fields: Food preservation

Lloyd Augustus Hall (June 20, 1894 – January 2, 1971) was an American chemist, who contributed to the science of food preservation. By the end of his career, Hall had amassed 59 United States patents, and a number of his inventions were also patented in other countries.

== Biography ==
Lloyd Hall was born in Elgin, Illinois on June 20, 1894. Hall's grandmother came to Illinois using the "Underground Railroad" at the age of sixteen. His grandfather came to Chicago in 1837 and was one of the founders of the Quinn Chapel A.M.E. Church. He became the church's first pastor in 1841. Hall's parents, Augustus and Isabel, both graduated high school. Although Lloyd was born in Elgin, his family moved to Aurora, Illinois. He graduated in 1912 from East Aurora High School in Aurora. After graduating school, he studied pharmaceutical chemistry at Northwestern University, earning a Bachelor of Science and a [Master's degree]at the University of Chicago. At Northwestern, Hall met Carroll L. Griffith, who with his father, Enoch L. Griffith, founded Griffith Laboratories. The Griffiths later hired Hall as their chief chemist.

After leaving university, Hall was hired by the Western Electric Company after a phone interview. The company refused to hire Hall after they discovered he was black. Hall then went to work as a chemist for the Department of Health in Chicago followed by a job as chief chemist with the John Morrell Company.

During World War I, Hall served with the United States Ordnance Department where he was promoted to Chief Inspector of Powder and Explosives. In 2004, he was inducted into the National Inventors Hall of Fame for his work.

Following the war, Hall married Myrrhene Newsome and they moved to Chicago so he could work for the Boyer Chemical Laboratory, again as a chief chemist. Following this, Hall became president and chemical director for Chemical Products Corporation's consulting laboratory. In 1925, Hall took a position with Griffith Laboratories where he remained for 34 years.

== Major contributions ==
Lloyd Hall devoted much of his life and efforts to food science curing meat, particularly to improving a [curing salt] marketed by Griffith Laboratories known as flash-drying. This product originated with German chemist Karl Max Seifert, developer of a process whereby solutions of sodium chloride and one or more secondary salts were sprayed onto hot metal and rapidly dried, producing crystals of the secondary salts encased inside a shell of sodium chloride. Seifert patented the process in 1934 and sold the rights to Griffith Laboratories. The adaptation of Seifert's process specifically for meat curing was then patented by company owner Enoch L. Griffith, who proposed nitrates and nitrites, well-known curing agents, as the secondary butt salts.

Lloyd Hall is often falsely credited with the original invention of Seifert's process. However, Hall took a leading role in developing the patent after it was sold to Griffith Laboratories, adding hygroscopic agents such as corn sugar and glycerine to inhibit caking of the powder. Most of his patents in meat curing dealt with either preventing caking of the curing composition, or remedying undesired effects caused by the anticaking agents.

Hall also investigated the role of spices in food preservation. It was common knowledge that certain seasonings had antimicrobial properties, but Hall and co-worker Carroll L. Griffith found that some spices carried many bacteria, as well as yeast and mold spores. To counter these problems, they patented in 1938 a means to sterilize spices through exposure to ethylene oxide gas, a fumigant. Hall and Griffith later promoted the use of ethylene oxide for the sterilization of medical equipment, helping to advance an idea that had been around for several years.

Hall also invented new uses of antioxidants to prevent food spoilage, especially the onset of rancidity in fats and oils. Aware that unprocessed vegetable oils frequently contained natural antioxidants such as lecithin that slowed their spoilage, he developed means of combining these compounds with salts and other materials so that they could be readily introduced to other foods.

After retiring from Griffith in 1959, Hall consulted for the Food and Agriculture Organization of the United Nations. From 1962 to 1964, he sat on the American Food for Peace Council. He died in 1971 in Pasadena, California. He was awarded several honors during his lifetime, including honorary degrees from Virginia State University, Howard University, and the Tuskegee Institute and in 2004 he was inducted into the National Inventors Hall of Fame for his work.,

== Personal life ==
Charles E. Hall was his uncle.

== Patents ==
1. 1,882,834, 10/18/1932, Asphalt emulsion and manufacture thereof
2. 1,914,351, 6/13/1933, Protective coating, Enoch L.Griffith (co-inventor)
3. 2,022,464, 11/26/1935, Vitamin concentrate,
4. 2,097,405, 10/26/1937, Manufacture of bleached pepper products
5. 2,107,697, 2/8/1938, Sterilizing foodstuffs, Carroll L. Griffith (co-inventor)
6. 2,155,045, 4/18/1939, Inhibited detergent composition
7. 2,189,949, 2/13/1940, Sterilizing colloid materials
8. 2,251,334, 8/5/1941, Protein composition of matter
9. 2,321,673, 6/15/1944, Yeast food
10. 2,357,650, 9/5/1944, Puncture sealing composition and manufacture thereof
11. 2,363,730, 11/28/1944, Manufacture of nitrogen-fortified whey concentrate
12. 2,385,412, 9/25/1945, Capsicum-containing seasoning composition
13. 2,414,299, 1/14/1947, Production of protein hydrolysate flavoring material
14. 2,464,200, 3/15/1949, Manufacture of stable dry papain composition
15. 2,464,927, 3/22/1949, Antioxidant
16. 2,477,742, 8/2/1949, Gelatin-base coating for food and the like
17. 2,493,288, 1/3/1950, Synergistic antioxidants and the methods of preparing the same
18. 2,500,543, 3/14/1950, Antioxidant
19. 2,511,802, 6/13/1950, Synergistic antioxidant
20. 2,511,803, 7/13/1950, Antioxidant flakes
21. 2,511,804, 7/13/1950, Antioxidant salt
22. 2,518,233, 8/8/1950, Synergistic antioxidant containing amino acids
23. 2,536,171, 1/2/1951, Production of protein hydrolysate
24. 2,758,931, 8/14/1956, Antioxidant composition
25. 2,770,551, 11/27/1956, Meat-curing salt composition
26. 2,772,169, 11/13/1956, Antioxidant material and use of said material in treating meat
27. 2,845,358, 7/29/1958, Method of preserving frozen pork
