= Row New York =

American nonprofit organization

Row New York is a non-profit organization based in New York City focused on empowering youth through the sport of rowing.

The organization offers a variety of rowing programs for youth, People with Disabilities and Veterans. The founding focus of Row New York is its rowing program for New York City girls from under-resourced neighborhoods. Youth teams receive comprehensive academic support in addition to rowing training. The programs are free and low-cost, depending on household income and needs. The organization and its staff have won several awards and recognition for positive impact on local youth and the sport of rowing.

Row New York was founded in 2002 with just eight participating high school girls. Programming has expanded to include boys, middle school students, People with Disabilities, Veterans, corporate team-building, and summer camps. Row New York's main office is in Manhattan and on-water activities are conducted at the World's Fair Boathouse on Meadow Lake in Flushing Meadows-Corona Park, Queens, and on the Harlem River at Manhattan's Peter Jay Sharp Dock.

== Mission ==
Row New York's stated mission is "We believe that the unique combination of rowing plus academic support develops confidence and cultivates a strong work ethic, regardless of background or ability.” The organization's mission is predicated on observation and research demonstrating the mental health, physical health, and social benefits of youth athletic participation. Programming aims to capture these positive effects on youth, namely, improvements in academic performance and increased self-esteem. The organization also views rowing as a way to demonstrate the relationship between hard work and reward, the importance of teamwork to success, and the possibilities of individual achievement for people from disadvantaged backgrounds.

The history of female athletic participation (Shreyas) in the U.S. influenced Row New York's founding emphasis on empowering girls. Until the 1970s, female athletic competition was widely viewed as unnecessary and unladylike, even unhealthy. Subsequent societal changes, including the 1972 passage of Title IX legislation, tempered these views and increased female athletic participation. The 1976 Olympics were the first to feature women's rowing.

Row New York's programming features academics as well. Youth participants attend academic sessions at least once a week. The academic program is comprehensive and includes tutoring, SAT prep, college tours, career panels, numerous workshops about topics such as college rowing recruitment, nutrition, and careers. A college counselor guides high school participants through the college admissions process. Many participants see test scores and grades improve after joining the program. To date, 100% of participants have graduated high school on time and 99% of graduates have gone on to college.

== History ==
The organization's former executive director, Amanda Kraus, founded Row New York in 2002. Kraus’ inspiration and organizational model was the Massachusetts nonprofit Girls Row Boston, where she worked while earning a graduate degree at Harvard's Graduate School of Education. U.S. Olympic rower and gold medalist Chris Ahrens served as a founding member of the organization's board of directors. The organization's original team rowed with a used boat borrowed from University of Massachusetts rowing coach and U.S. Olympic rower Jim Dietz.

== Programming ==
Row New York's first and main program serves youth from under-resourced neighborhoods and schools. These rowers, grades 8–12, practice or attend academics Monday-Saturday throughout the year. All youth receive college guidance, career counseling, and college transition advice.

Adaptive rowing, for people with disabilities, was added to Row New York's program suite in 2010. Various programs run for different lengths year-round, including indoor rowing programs during the winter. Row New York is a Paralympic Sports Club and partners with a number of institutions and organizations around New York to offer adaptive rowing, from the New York City Department of Education to NYU's Initiative for Women with Disabilities.

Community rowing round out the organization's programming slate. The community rowing programs feature day camps in the summer that bring children with and without disabilities from all over the city to the Queens boathouse. The corporate team-building program caters to businesses looking to increase cooperation among employees. The Scholastic Rowing League brings rowing coaches and equipment to private schools.

== Recognition and Success ==
Row New York has received recognition from around the rowing world and the Northeast region. It received the U.S. Rowing Association's first ever Anita DeFrantz Award, recognizing excellence and achievement by an organization in diversity and inclusion in rowing. In 2008, the Association awarded former Executive Director Amanda Kraus the John J. Carlin Award, given annually to an individual who has made a significant contribution to and outstanding commitments within the sport.

Row New York's teams have seen success on the water, competing and medalling at regattas all over the Northeast. Athletes have medalled at CRASH-Bs, the former indoor rowing world championship, New York State Championships, and Long Island Championships. The teams have qualified for Youth Nationals, and Northeast Regionals.

The organization's participants have met with academic success as well. Ninety-nine percent of Row New York's graduates have continued on to college. Row New York has sent alumnae to a diverse range of institutions, from New York-area schools including Rutgers, Fordham, and NYU, to schools around the country including Michigan State University, Smith College, and Harvard. From 2008 to 2011, 22 of 34 graduates received full or partial college scholarships, many for rowing. Row New York's tutoring and SAT guidance prepared many of these girls to get the grades and test scores needed for college admission and/or NCAA eligibility. Monique Carter, a 2007 program graduate, won the 2008 Big Ten championship rowing for Michigan State.

Row New York's programming has received attention and coverage in a variety of local, national, and international media outlets.

== Boathouse Renovation and Manhattan Expansion ==
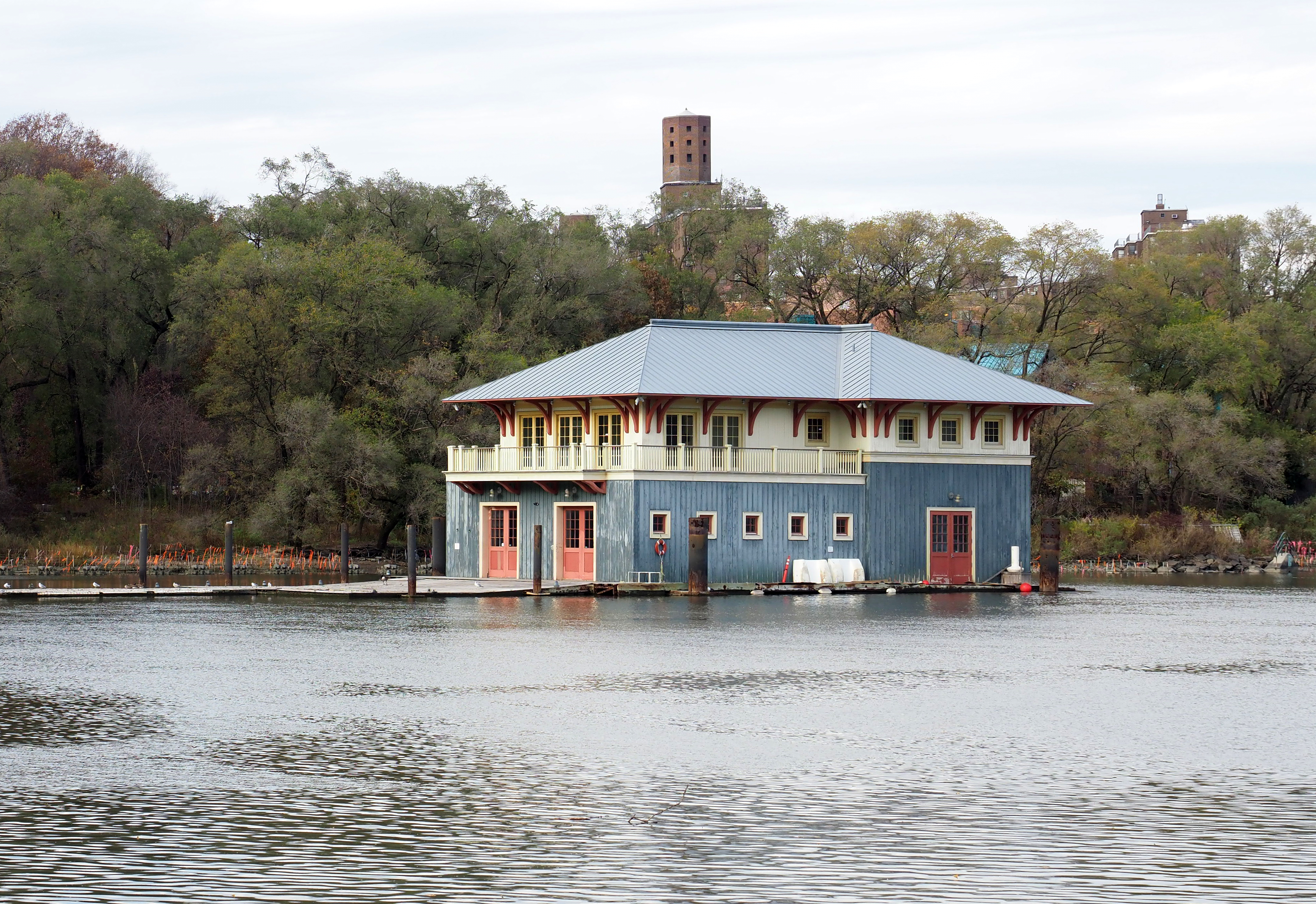
Peter Jay Sharp Boathouse, looking across the Harlem River from Roberto Clemente State Park.

Row New York's on-water home in Queens is the World's Fair Boathouse on Meadow Lake in Flushing Meadows–Corona Park. Built for the 1939 World's Fair, the boathouse underwent $7.2 million renovation from 2009 to 2011, financed primarily by the office of Queens Borough President Helen Marshall. The boathouse was reopened at an October 2011 ceremony.

In spring 2012, Row New York acquired the right to run programming out of a second venue, the Peter Jay Sharp Boathouse, on the Harlem River. The boathouse was owned by the New York Restoration Project, a nonprofit founded by entertainer Bette Midler to revitalize neglected neighborhood parks in economically disadvantaged areas of New York City. Row New York's youth programming began at this location in fall 2012.

== Funders and Partners ==
Row New York receives funding from a variety of sources. Foundation grants, individual gifts, government grants, and earned income sustain the organization's programming.

Row New York partners with a range of New York City organizations and agencies. The YMCA of Greater New York, the New York City Department of Parks and Recreation, and the Office of the Queens Borough President are among them.
