= John O'Rourke =

John O'Rourke may refer to:

- John O'Rourke (baseball) (1849–1911), baseball player
- John O'Rourke (priest) (1809–1887), author, priest
- John O'Rourke (footballer, born 1945) (1945–2016), English footballer
- John O'Rourke (politician, born 1834) (1834–1882), American politician in Wisconsin and Nebraska
- John O'Rourke (New York politician) (fl. 1930–1942), American politician and judge from Queens, New York
- John O'Rourke (Gaelic footballer) (born 1992), Irish Gaelic footballer
- John H. O'Rourke (1856–1929), Jesuit priest
- John O'Rourke, producer of the 1996 film The Pompatus of Love
- Jack O'Rourke (footballer, born 1928) (1928–2008), Australian rules footballer
- Jack O'Rourke (footballer, born 1899) (1899–1969), Australian rules footballer
