= Queens Zoo =

Zoo in Queens, New York

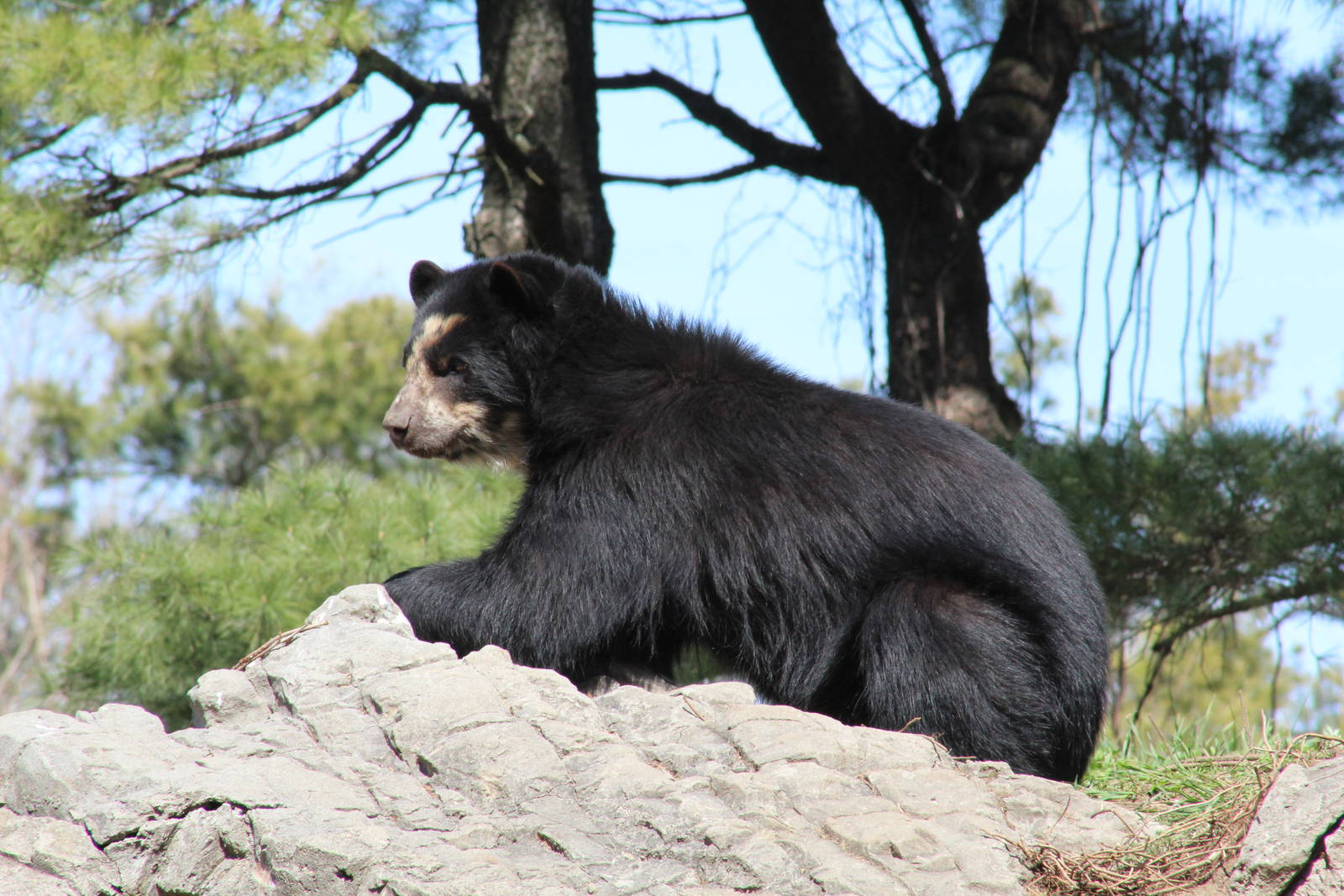
- Andean bear female at the zoo
- Interactive map of Queens Zoo
- 40°44′42″N 73°50′54″W
- Date opened: February 28, 1968 (children's farm); October 26, 1968 (rest of zoo)
- Location: Queens, New York, United States
- Land area: 11 acres (4.5 ha)
- No. of species: 112 (as of 2013)
- Memberships: AZA
- Management: Wildlife Conservation Society
- Public transit: Subway: at 111th Street or Mets–Willets Point; Bus: Q23, Q58; LIRR: Port Washington Branch at Mets–Willets Point
- Website: www.queenszoo.com

The Queens Zoo (formerly the Flushing Meadows Zoo and Queens Wildlife Center) is an 11-acre (4.5 ha) zoo at Flushing Meadows–Corona Park in Queens, New York City, between Grand Central Parkway and 111th Street. The zoo is managed by the Wildlife Conservation Society and is accredited by the Association of Zoos and Aquariums (AZA). Built along with the Queens Zoo is a children's zoo, which was originally called the Heckscher Children's Farm.

New York City parks commissioner Robert Moses had wanted to add a zoo to Flushing Meadows–Corona Park after the 1964 New York World's Fair. Plans for the zoo were first announced in 1964 as part of the Queens Botanical Garden, but construction for the zoo did not begin until August 20, 1966. The Heckscher Children's Farm, the first part of the new zoo, opened on February 28, 1968, and the rest of the Flushing Meadows Zoo opened on October 26, 1968. The New York City Department of Parks and Recreation contracted Wildlife Conservation Society to operate the zoo in 1988. The zoo was closed for renovations for four years, reopening in 1992; it added numerous animals and exhibits after it reopened. The Queens Zoo was nearly shuttered in 2003 due to budget cuts.

The zoo is home to more than 75 species that are native to the Americas. Unlike contemporary zoos, the Queens Zoo did not put animals in cages except when necessary; since the zoo's habitats are open-air, it focuses mostly on animals native to the Americas. The main zoo (now the zoo's wild side), on the eastern portion of the site, contains landscape features such as a marsh and artificially warmed rocks. The domestic side of the zoo, originally the Heckscher Children's Farm, includes domesticated animals. The zoo's aviary is a geodesic dome designed by Thomas C. Howard of Synergetics, Inc. and used during the 1964 fair.

== History ==
The zoo is part of Flushing Meadows–Corona Park in the New York City borough of Queens. The park's site was part of the 1939–1940 New York World's Fair grounds, and the land saw little development during the next quarter-century. The site of the zoo was part of the Transportation Zone during the 1964–1965 New York World's Fair, when the Chrysler Pavilion and Lowenbrau beer garden occupied the zoo's site. By the 1960s, Queens was the only New York City borough without a zoo. Even before the 1964 World's Fair opened, New York City parks commissioner Robert Moses had wanted to add a zoo to Flushing Meadows–Corona Park. The zoo was part of Moses's plans for a system of parks in Queens.

=== Planning ===
Moses announced plans for the Queens Zoo in February 1964, when he indicated that it would be built as part of an expansion of the Queens Botanical Garden, on the eastern side of Flushing Meadows. In contrast to existing zoos where animals were kept in cages, the zoo was to have an open-air layout where animals could roam. The zoo would have covered either 11 acres (4.5 ha) or 35.5 acres (14.4 ha). That March, Mayor Robert F. Wagner Jr. requested that the New York City Council revise the City Administrative Code to permit the zoo's construction, and New York state legislators introduced bills to allow the Queens Botanical Garden Society to operate the zoo. The City Council signaled its support for the state legislation, but plans for the zoo were stymied because of opposition to Moses's plans for Flushing Meadows. The zoo was supposed to have been funded using profits from the 1964 fair, but the exposition proved highly unprofitable.

Before the fair closed, there was talk of converting the fair's geodesic dome into an aviary for the proposed zoo. Moses's successor, Newbold Morris, announced plans in October 1965 to spend $1.5 million on the Queens Zoo. Morris recommended that the Triborough Bridge and Tunnel Authority (TBTA) fund the restoration of the nearby New York City Pavilion, allowing the city government to divert funds for the City Pavilion's restoration to the zoo's construction. Ultimately, the TBTA agreed to provide $1.2 million for the zoo in February 1966, which was later increased to $1.92 million. This funding was made possible by a provision that allowed the TBTA to spend money on parks along certain highways. (Note: Specifically, the TBTA could upgrade parks and recreational facilities next to highways that led to its bridges and tunnels. Flushing Meadows Park is along the Grand Central Parkway, which leads to the Triborough Bridge.) The zoo was planned to cover 18 acres (7.3 ha), and the Heckscher Foundation for Children agreed to donate $120,000 for a 3.6-acre (1.5 ha) children's zoo within the Queens Zoo. Preliminary plans were being drawn up by early 1966. By that July, the city government was planning to construct the zoo on the site of the fair's former transportation area, west of the Grand Central Parkway, rather than next to the Queens Botanical Garden.

Moses attended the zoo's groundbreaking ceremony on August 20, 1966, and the children's zoo partially opened that September. Later that year, the TBTA announced more detailed plans for the zoo, which included a concession building and an aviary within the fair's geodesic dome. The agency also planned to award a $2 million contract for the zoo's operation. The TBTA awarded $2.82 million in construction contracts for the final sections of the zoo in June 1967, and the New York City Department of Parks and Recreation (NYC Parks) took over the land the same month. At that point, the children's zoo was planned to be completed in late 1967, followed by the rest of the zoo early the next year. Ultimately, the zoo cost $3.5 million to construct.

=== City operation ===
==== Opening and early years ====
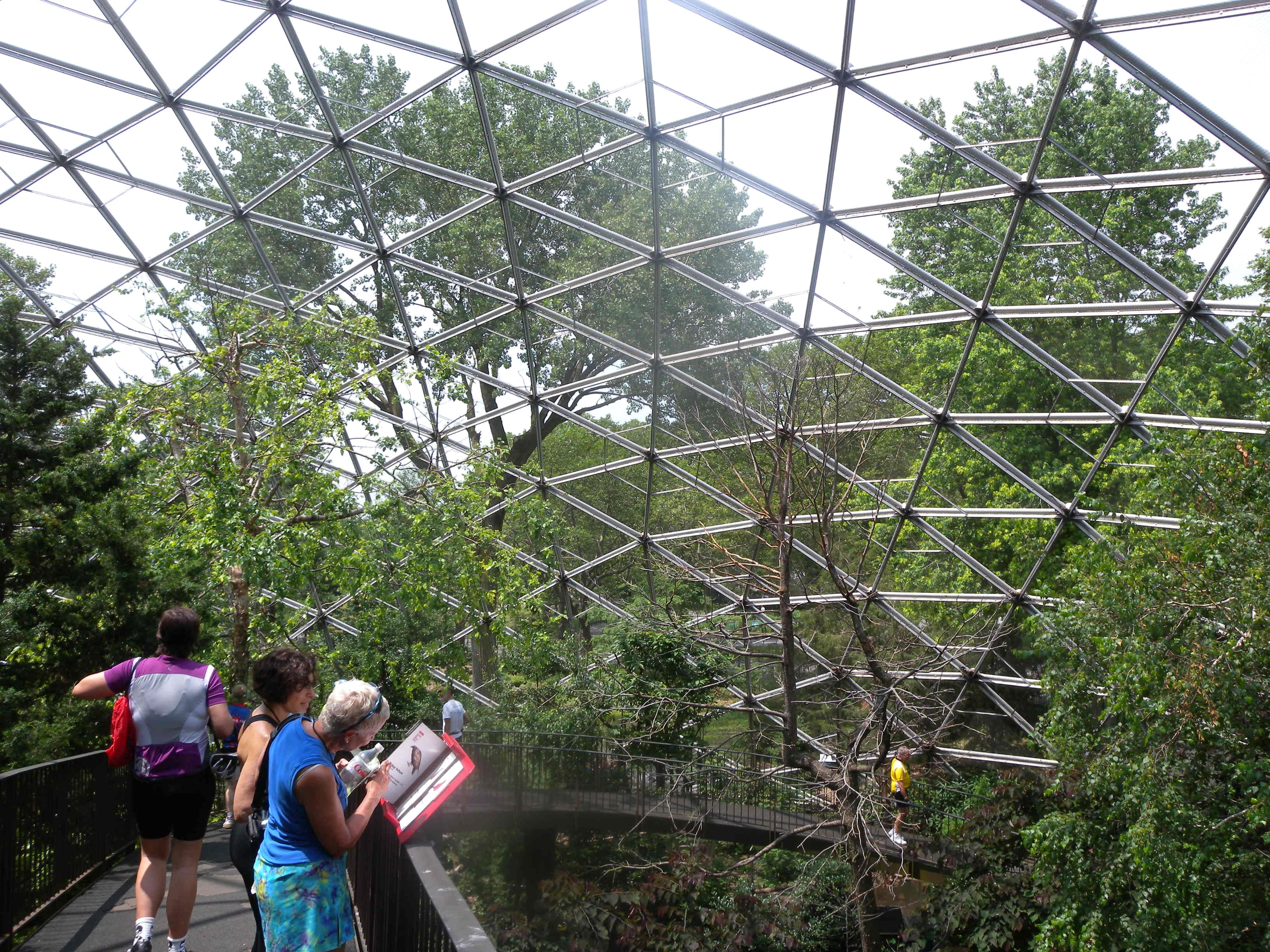
Inside the aviary

The first animals began moving into the Heckscher Children's Farm in February 1968, and Moses dedicated the children's farm on February 28 of that year. Moses opened the rest of the Flushing Meadows Zoo on October 26, 1968. The children's farm was initially free to enter, as was the rest of the zoo. The zoo also had pony rides and a carousel, for which an additional fee was charged. Tatiana Gillette-Infante, a former debutante, was hired as the Flushing Meadows Zoo's first supervisor. Soon after the zoo opened, there were reports of people cutting fences, abusing the zoo's birds, and stealing animals from the children's farm for joyrides. In addition, the zoo frequently experienced blackouts, as the park's underground electrical ducts ran through marshland. The zoo recorded 100 blackouts in its first three years, some of which had lasted as long as five days. These issues prompted Gillette-Infante to request that the city hire more zookeepers.

By the early 1970s, Gillette-Infante alleged that the city government was neglecting the zoo. She temporarily closed the aviary in October 1970 due to staffing shortages, and she closed the entire zoo the following June for similar reasons. Gillette-Infante also wanted the city government to upgrade the zoo's electrical system, and NYC Parks added a secondary power supply to the zoo in 1970. The aviary temporarily closed in May 1971 because visitors frequently attacked the birds and because the aviary's paths kept collapsing. Due to a lack of city funding, City Council member Thomas Manton warned in 1971 that the zoo might have to scale back its activities or even close altogether. The city government began regularly checking up on the zoo's animals in 1972, and Gillette-Infante wanted the city to add an animal clinic and a quarantine facility for newly arrived animals. As part of a planned United States Bicentennial celebration at Flushing Meadows–Corona Park, there were proposals to renovate the zoo.

==== Mid- and late 1970s ====
The Flushing Meadows Zoo continued to experience maintenance, funding, and staffing issues during the mid-1970s, and electricity was still inconsistent. The lack of money and staff forced the zoo to postpone a planned renovation of the aviary in early 1973. There were discussions about reopening the zoo's aviary in mid-1973, though the aviary remained closed over the following months. The zoo's insect house was also shuttered. Security at the zoo was increased in 1974 following several incidents at the Prospect Park and Central Park zoos. Additional policemen were stationed in the surrounding area, and the zoo began employing curatorial staff 24 hours a day. Shirley Weinstein of the Mid-Queens Community Council alleged that the zoo was being neglected; at the time, the zoo had over 100 animals. Gillette-Infante recalled that local residents often left unwanted pets there in the 1970s.

NYC Parks commissioned the naturalist Roger A. Caras in 1974 to study conditions in the city's three municipal zoos at Flushing Meadows, Central Park, and Prospect Park. Though Caras found fewer problems at the Flushing Meadows Zoo than the two other zoos, he recommended that all three zoos be taken over by the New York Zoological Society. City parks commissioner Edwin L. Weisl also supported the takeover, and he preferred that the zoos be closed if the Zoological Society could not take over operations. By the beginning of 1975, the city was negotiating to transfer operation of the zoos to the Zoological Society. Protestors wanted the zoos to be closed entirely, and the Society for Animal Rights sued in April 1975 to compel the city to close the three municipal zoos. The city government also sold off some of the zoos' animals, citing overcrowding. A state-government report questioned whether the city government, which was in the midst of a major fiscal crisis, should be using its limited funds to maintain the Flushing Meadows Zoo and the city's other small zoos. The aviary remained closed during the late 1970s, and the zoo's last seals died in 1976.

The zoo's opponents continued to advocate for its closure. Tony Carding of the World Federation for the Protection of Animals wrote that, while the zoo was "a more humane and potentially educational attempt at exposing captive wild animals to public view", the site had high amounts of noise pollution. A groundhog pen was added to the zoo in 1978. The same year, U.S. Congressman Benjamin Rosenthal proposed adding the surrounding park to the Gateway National Recreation Area, allowing the National Park Service to take over the zoo's operation, but this legislation was not successful. By the following year, the zoo had only five exhibits, and it suffered from a lack of funds and staff. The seal pool was completely empty, and the zoo as a whole did not have many North American animals. Further contributing to its unpopularity, the Flushing Meadows Zoo closed at 4 p.m. each day, and the city government was not planning any major renovations.

=== WCS operation ===
==== 1980s takeover agreement ====
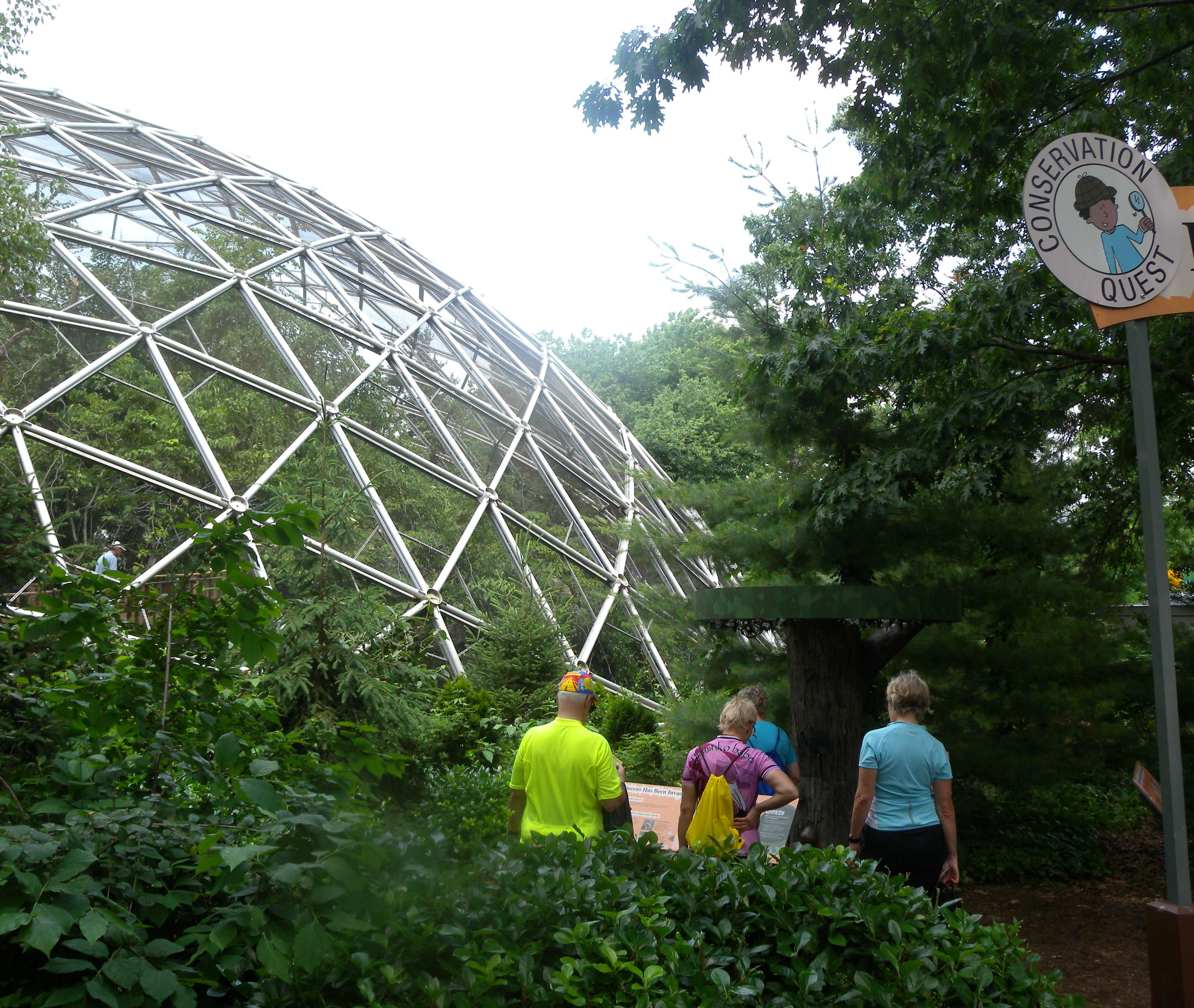
The aviary's exterior

By 1980, the city government was again negotiating to hand over control of the three municipal zoos to the New York Zoological Society. The society had wanted to take over only the Central Park Zoo, but the city government insisted that the group also take control of the two other zoos. Mayor Ed Koch and the New York Zoological Society signed a fifty-year agreement in April 1980, wherein the Central Park, Prospect Park, and Flushing Meadows zoos would be administered by the Society. As part of the takeover, the Society planned to implement an admission fee, and it would spend $4.5 million renovating the zoo and adding animals. Queens borough president Donald Manes requested that the city provide $2 million for the zoo's renovation in its budget for fiscal year 1981. Negotiations continued for another year and a half, and the New York City Council and Board of Estimate had to approve the admission fees as well. The zoo received four sea lions in 1981, and it also received a lion cub despite having no lion enclosure. (Note: The lion was later moved to California.)

The Zoological Society signed an agreement in October 1981 to manage and renovate the zoos. Although the Board of Estimate approved the agreement that month, the society was not scheduled to take over the zoo immediately. As part of the agreement, the three municipal zoos were to be renovated. The Flushing Meadows Zoo was originally planned to be renovated between 1984 and 1985 for $5 million, though designs for the renovation were incomplete at the end of 1981. The zoo launched a program the next year, in which it showed exotic animals to children across Queens. NYC Parks began promoting the zoo in 1985 after finding that many Queens residents did not know about its existence. The same year, NYC Parks formed the Friends of the Queens Zoo group to oversee improvements at the zoo. By then, the zoo had 200 animals. Following a mauling at the Prospect Park Zoo, signs and fences were installed around the bear enclosure, and security at the zoo was increased. In addition, the zoo still experienced power shortages, and a U.S. federal inspector raised concerns that the zoo's clinic lacked consistent electricity. The aviary also reopened c. 1987.

==== Renovation and 1990s ====
The Zoological Society began drawing up plans for the zoo in 1986; the renovation was part of a larger project to refurbish Flushing Meadows–Corona Park. The Flushing Meadows Zoo was in better condition compared with the Central Park and Prospect Park zoos, so it needed fewer renovations. The Board of Estimate gave NYC Parks permission to hire a construction contractor for the zoo in April 1987, and Lehrer, McGovern & Bovis were hired to rebuild the zoo. The city government announced in July 1987 that the zoo would close for renovations, and it began moving animals out of the zoo. At the time, the zoo's renovation was scheduled to take two or three years. The Zoological Society sought to continue hosting North American species there. The Flushing Meadows Zoo was supposed to have closed in late 1987, but its closure was delayed while the animals were relocated. The zoo's 30 employees were reassigned to other parks in New York City. The animals were sent to various sites in the northeast U.S. Some chickens remained behind, and the operator of the neighboring Flushing Meadows Carousel fed the chickens for the next several years.

The Flushing Meadows Zoo was temporarily closed for renovations on August 8, 1988, and workers began razing the existing structures. The project included new exhibits, a refurbished petting zoo, and rebuilt pathways, in addition to landscaping changes. The old walls and fences were replaced or concealed, and greenery and rocks were added. At the end of 1989, city officials allocated $550,000 for new equipment at the zoo. The renovation ultimately was finished in 1991, but the zoo remained closed because of a lack of funding from the city government. Weeds started to grow in the zoo due to a lack of maintenance, and the Zoological Society hired security guards to patrol the site. Additionally, because all of the animals had been sold off, the Zoological Society had to get new animals. Mayor David Dinkins ultimately agreed to provide funding for the zoo after Queens borough president Claire Shulman threatened to prevent the nearby USTA National Tennis Center from being expanded. The zoo's annual operating costs at the time were about $1–2 million. In total, the project had cost $16 million or $17 million.

The zoo reopened on June 25, 1992; it was renamed the Queens Zoo, and it began charging an admission fee. The city planned to expand a parking area near the zoo as well, and new entrances to Flushing Meadows–Corona Park from 111th Street were built to provide more direct access to the zoo. Even after the renovation and renaming, the Queens Zoo struggled to attract guests. The Zoological Society was renamed the Wildlife Conservation Society (WCS) in 1993, and the zoo was rebranded as the Queens Wildlife Center, though it continued to be known as the Queens Zoo. People frequently dumped unwanted animals at the zoo after it reopened, particularly during Easter, prompting objections from WCS officials. The zoo had 400 animals by the mid-1990s, and it recorded around 180,000 annual visitors during that decade. A Chinese alligator exhibit was added in 1997. Even after the renovation, few people knew about the Queens Zoo, especially because visitors tended to frequent the better-known Bronx and Central Park zoos.

==== 2000s to present ====
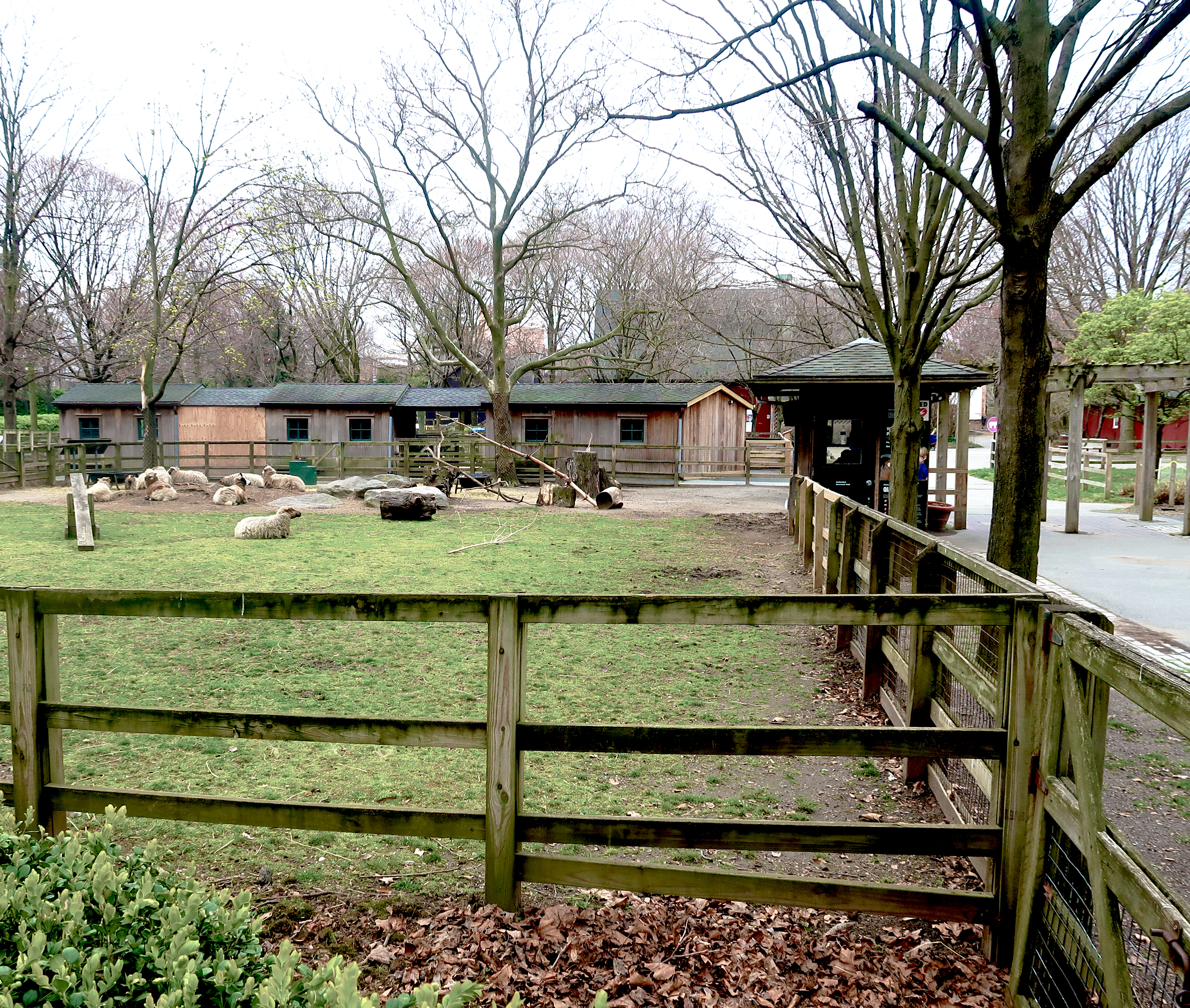
The zoo's petting farm

The WCS requested $950,000 from the city government for a parrot habitat in 2000, and it requested $4.2 million from Queens borough president Claire Shulman the next year for a jaguar exhibit. Shulman ultimately provided $4.3 million from both projects. By then, the WCS had added several species to the zoo and was adding more birds to the aviary. The zoo saw 200,000 annual visitors, and the WCS was hiring multilingual volunteers and printing brochures in multiple languages to attract more visitors. The zoo was officially renamed the Queens Zoo in May 2001 after the WCS found that visitors were confused about the "Wildlife Center" name. The same year, the barn on the domestic side was expanded. Following the September 11 attacks later that year, the zoo recorded increased attendance, in part because local residents were no longer traveling far. When the zoo celebrated the tenth anniversary of its reopening in 2002, the WCS was about to begin constructing the parrot and jaguar habitats.

In 2003, Mayor Michael Bloomberg proposed eliminating funding for the Prospect Park and Queens zoos to fill a citywide budget gap, effectively forcing the WCS to close the zoos. The changes would have resulted in a total savings of around $5.6 million or $5.8 million. At the time, the Queens Zoo received $3.5 million per year, and closing the zoo would have cost $4 million; only about 10% of the zoo's operating costs were funded by the WCS itself. The WCS would have needed to relocate 400 animals from the zoo if it were closed. In response to the announcement, local residents signed petitions opposing the budget cuts; one such petition garnered more than 100,000 signatures. There were discussions about restoring the funds in exchange for raising admission fees and introducing private sponsorships at the zoos, and the WCS also contemplated renting out the zoos for private events. That June, the city government ultimately agreed to restore $4.8 million for the Prospect Park and Queens zoos, though the WCS had to fire staff, discontinue programs, and double admission fees. Funding for the zoo was accidentally removed from the city's budget in 2004, though it was quickly restored.

A parrot exhibit opened at the zoo in July 2004, and the prairie dog habitat was replaced two years later with a habitat for southern pudu. The WCS also renovated the zoo's aviary in 2006 with $640,000 from the office of borough president Helen M. Marshall. Though the Queens Zoo had initially focused on keeping North American animals, the zoo also included many South American animals as well by the late 2000s. This helped attract more visitors, particularly South American immigrants who lived nearby. Robin Dalton, who had served as the zoo's director since it reopened, retired in 2006. The zoo's logtime curator, Scott Silver, became its director following a two-year search. After Silver was promoted, he sought to increase visitation by completing the jaguar habitat and adding a children's playground. At the time, the zoo attracted about 200,000 annual visitors, most of who came from the surrounding neighborhood. In addition, three interactive exhibits were added to the Queens Zoo in 2008.

The zoo had still not constructed the jaguar habitat in 2010 due to a lack of funds. A Wi-Fi network was added to the zoo in 2012 as part of a program to improve Wi-Fi access across New York City parks. In addition, borough president Melinda Katz provided $480,000 for renovations to the aviary and the overpass over the zoo's marsh. In March 2020, the Queens Zoo and the WCS's other facilities were shuttered indefinitely due to the COVID-19 pandemic in New York City. The zoo reopened that July; visitors were initially required to reserve timed tickets, and the zoo's paths were temporarily converted to one-way paths to allow social distancing.

== Description ==
Attractions and geographical features of Flushing Meadows–Corona Park
Attractions and geographical features of Flushing Meadows–Corona Park:
1 Citi Field
2 Etihad Park (under construction)
3 Flushing Meadows Carousel and Queens Zoo
4 Flushing Meadows Corona Park Aquatics Center
5 Flushing River and Creek
6 Meadow Lake and Hong Kong Dragon Boat Festival
7 Metropolitan Park (planned) and Shea Stadium (demolished)
8 Mets–Willets Point subway station
9 Mets–Willets Point LIRR station
10 National Tennis Center and United States Pavilion (demolished)
11 New York Hall of Science
12 New York State Pavilion and Queens Theatre
13 Queens Botanical Garden
14 Queens Museum
15 Queens Night Market
16 Terrace on the Park
17 Unisphere
18 Willow Lake
19 World's Fair subway station (demolished)

The Queens Zoo is located at 53-51 111th Street within Flushing Meadows–Corona Park in Queens, New York City, near 53rd Avenue and west of Grand Central Parkway. It operates year-round. The Queens Zoo has been operated by the Wildlife Conservation Society since its reopening in 1992, and it is accredited by the Association of Zoos and Aquariums.

The zoo is divided into a wild side, where animals roam around in landscaped exhibits, and a domestic side, where visitors could interact with domesticated animals. One of Flushing Meadows–Corona Park's paths separates the two sides. There is a walk-through aviary within the wild side of the zoo. To the north of the zoo is the New York Hall of Science museum, while to the west is the Terrace on the Park banquet hall. Near the zoo's entrance are two fountains, known as the Fountain of the Planet of the Apes and the Fountain of the Grapes of Wrath. The Flushing Meadows Carousel is next to the domestic side of the zoo (originally the children's farm).

=== Wild side ===
The main zoo (now the zoo's wild side) is located on the eastern portion of the site. The wild side originally covered 18 acres (7.3 ha); following the 1990s renovation, the wild side covered an oval-shaped plot of about 11 acres (4.5 ha). There were originally pools and ponds throughout the zoo, including a seal pool measuring 110 by 30 feet (33.5 by 9.1 m). In contrast to other zoos, the Queens Zoo did not put animals in cages except when necessary. Animals stayed outdoors, and dry moats and low fences surrounded each animal's enclosure. Most animals' enclosures were designed to resemble their natural habitats. High chain-link fences were used for the former wolf enclosure, which also had a moat surrounding it. Another fence surrounded the entirety of the zoo. The main entrance has a decorative gate by Albino Manca and Clarke & Rapuano, known as Gates of Life.

Following the 1990s renovation, the main pond was enlarged, and a marsh was added. The wolves were removed, and new exhibits were added for bears, bison, bobcats, coyotes, mountain lions, prairie dogs, Roosevelt elk, sandhill cranes, and water birds. The habitats include hidden landscape features, such as artificially warmed rocks in the mountain-lion exhibit, as well as tree stumps with sprinklers in the bison range. Vegetation was placed over the fences to hide them, and hills were added to several habitats to allow visitors to more easily see the animals. To mimic the conditions found in the wild, zookeepers hide food in landscape features such as tree trunks and logs. A sea lion pool and a sea lion store occupy the center of the wild side's eastern end, and there is an administration building at the southern end.

Informational signs are placed throughout the zoo. The modern zoo also includes a winding pathway around the perimeter of the oval path. Observation platforms lead off the pathway into several habitats. In addition, there is a "graveyard" with information about extinct species.

==== Aviary ====
The zoo's aviary is at the northeast corner of the wild side. It consists of a geodesic dome designed by Thomas C. Howard for the 1964 fair, based on a concept by Buckminster Fuller. The dome was originally located on what is now the site of the Buzz Vollmer Playground in the northern section of Flushing Meadows–Corona Park. The dome is 175 feet (53 m) wide and was one of the largest single-layer structures of its time. For the fair's 1964 season, it was used as a multipurpose event facility with 2,100 seats. The following year, the dome became a memorial to former British prime minister Winston Churchill, with numerous artifacts from Churchill's life. The memorial was sponsored by the nonprofit organization People to People. The dome was dismantled and stored after the fair; it was later reassembled in the zoo with a mesh netting instead of a solid tent.

Prior to the fair's 1965 season, there had been discussions about using the dome as an aviary after the fair. When the dome was reinstalled in the zoo, landscape architects Gilmore David Clarke and Michael Rapuano redesigned its interior as an aviary, while Andrews & Clark were hired as the engineers. Rocks, bushes, and trees were added inside. The aviary also had an asphalt walkway, as well as a 30-foot-tall (9.1 m), 162-foot-long (49 m) spiral bridge. Birds were allowed to fly throughout the aviary, as there were no cages. In the 1970s, the aviary's birds were recorded as including guinea hens, mynas, peacocks, Chinese pheasants, and quail. After the zoo reopened in 1992, the aviary included a walkway winding upward to the height of the trees. The modern interior includes native plantings such as white pine trees, and the trees are constantly pruned so visitors could see the birds there. The dome is covered with netting to prevent the birds from escaping. By 2006, the aviary had 90 birds from 20 species.

=== Domestic side ===
The western side of the zoo is dedicated to domestic animals. Built as a children's zoo called the Heckscher Children's Farm, it was designed in the style of an American homestead. When the Queens Zoo was being developed, the children's farm was supposed to contain amusement rides. At the time of its opening, the children's zoo included pigs, cows, sheep, donkeys, ponies, rabbits, and ducks, most of whom had been raised at the Central Park Zoo. There was a one-story structure that exhibited live insects; at the time of its completion, the insect house was the only one in the New York City area. The children's farm included a concession stand shaped like a farmhouse, and a dairy house was added in the 1990s. By the 2000s, the domestic side of the zoo had a barn with educational programs.

=== Events and activities ===
The zoo has hosted various events over the years. For example, it has hosted the annual Bison Bonanza, with bison-themed children's activities such as face painting and storytelling. The zoo has also presented children's activities during events such as the Fall Fun festival, International Migratory Bird Day, Winter Breakout, Natural History Happening, and the International Harvest Festival. There have been other events such as annual sheep-shearing weekends and winter camps for children. During the 1990s, the Queens Zoo also hosted Groundhog Day ceremonies, in which people looked at the shadows of the zoo's prairie dogs to forecast an early spring; the practice ended in 2006 when the prairie dogs were relocated. In addition, the zoo hosts classes, and high-school students help operate the zoo's education and animal-care programs. These programs are provided in several languages.

== Animals ==
The zoo is home to as many as 112 species as of 2013, which are native to both North and South America. Initially, the zoo only housed animals that were native to North America. According to park commissioner August Heckscher, the zoo could keep only North American animals because it operated throughout the year and because all the exhibits were outdoors. The animals at the zoo also do not migrate south during the winter. The zoo's menagerie still focused on North American species after its 1990s renovation, but it has since expanded to include other species such as South American spectacled bears and American alligators. There is a small clinic for injured and sick animals; the clinic at the Bronx Zoo handles more serious injuries or illnesses. As part of a WCS program, almost all of the zoo's animals undergo animal enrichment training.

Originally, the zoo's animals included bears, wolves, bison, raccoons, otters, and waterfowl. After the zoo's 1990s renovation, it had 250 animals from 40 species, and species such as cougars, Roosevelt elk, and prairie dogs were added for the first time. The zoo's menagerie had grown to 400 animals by 2001. The zoo is home to Andean bears, pumas, California sea lions, coyotes, burrowing owls, Canadian lynxes, Southern pudus, thick-billed parrots, American alligators, American bison, trumpeter swans, bald eagles, barred owls, great horned owls, snowy owls, and Chacoan peccaries.

The zoo breeds Andean bears as part of a program to preserve the species; the first Andean bear was born at the zoo in 2017, and eight Andean bears have been born there as of 2024. The zoo has had breeding programs for Southern pudu since 2005, pronghorn antelopes since 2008, and New England cottontail rabbits since 2015. There is also a breeding program for Puerto Rican crested toads. Several animals have been rescued and resettled at the zoo, including a coyote caught in Central Park, two lion cubs rescued from Montana, and five coyote pups rescued from Massachusetts.

== Reception ==
When the zoo opened, a reviewer for the New York Daily News said that "the city's latest animal farm is small...and beautiful". The same writer said in 1969 that "we vote it as one of the most beautiful" attractions in Flushing Meadows–Corona Park, particularly praising the aviary and the seal pool. Newsday wrote in 1977 that "the Queens Zoo may strike visitors as a sylvan paradise", especially as compared with the cages in the Central Park Zoo, because animals at the Queens Zoo were allowed to roam around. By the late 1970s, the zoo's decline led one local politician to describe the Flushing Meadows Zoo as a "poor man's zoo", while Newsday remarked that the zoo "scarcely attracts Flushing citizens out for a walk", let alone tourists. Just before the zoo's renovation in 1987, Newsday wrote that the zoo was "a quiet, well-kept and surprisingly natural haven", despite the presence of the nearby Grand Central Parkway.

After the zoo reopened in 1992, Sarah Lyall of The New York Times said: "The Queens Zoo isn't the old Noah's Ark hodgepodge [...] but is rather a modest but carefully chosen collection of 40 species from North America." Another Times writer, Dulcie Leimbach, described the zoo as "a comfortable yet exotic visit" and likened the landscape to a wooded backyard. A Newsday writer described the zoo's new design as evoking "a natural rather than a zoo setting". A New York Daily News reporter wrote in 1996 that "you're sure to feel at home on this range" because of the zoo's activities and animals. A writer for the Poughkeepsie Journal likened the zoo to a national park in 2007, and one writer for The Wall Street Journal described the zoo in 2013 as "a romantic paradise of tall trees, flowering shrubs and rocky outcroppings disturbed only by the roar of the Grand Central Parkway." A New York Times writer characterized the aviary as the "most charming (and definitely the chirpiest) oasis in the park".

== See also ==
- List of zoos in the United States
- List of museums and cultural institutions in New York City
