= Queens Theatre (New York City) =

Professional theatre in Queens, New York

- Theaterama, Queens Playhouse

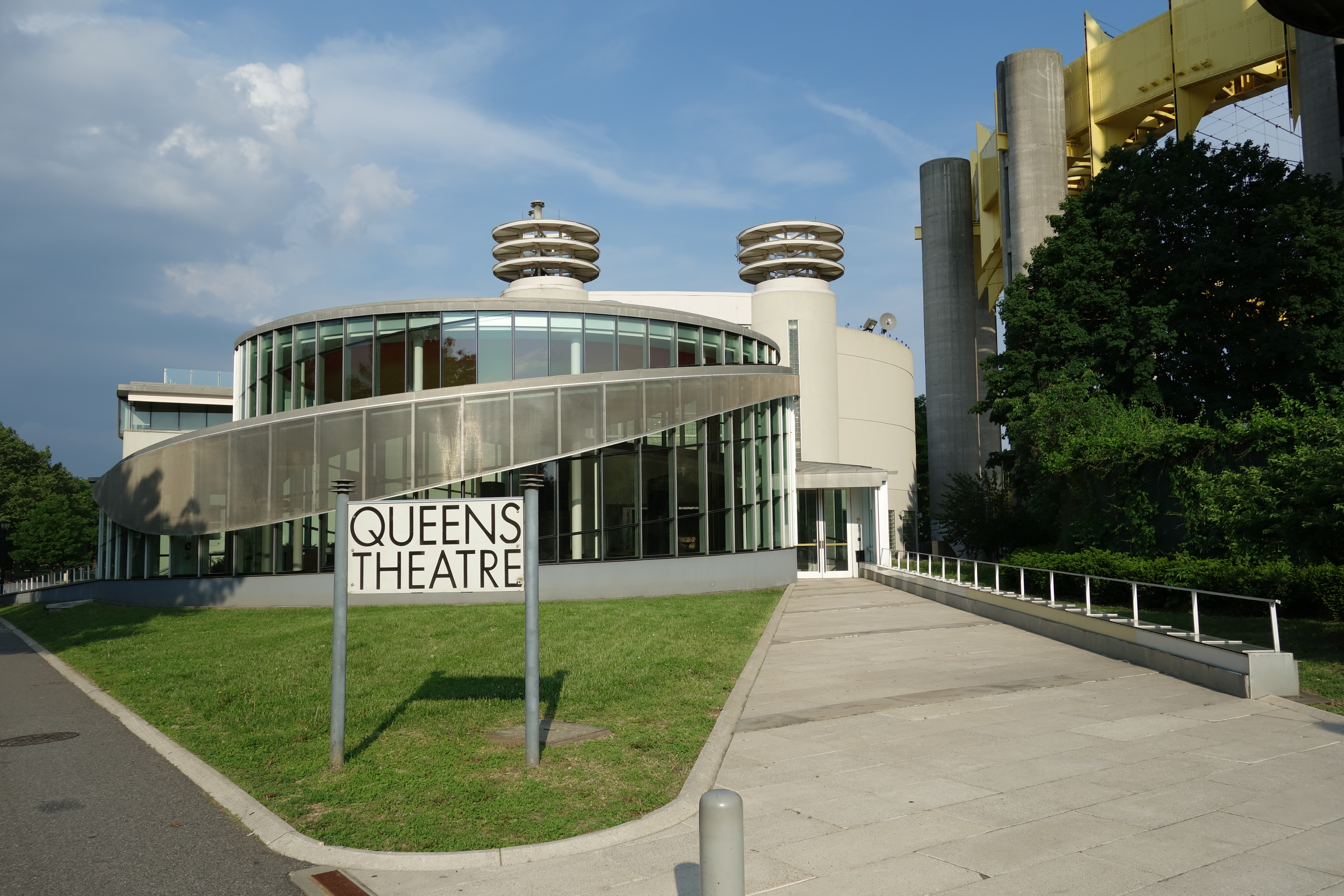
- Queens Theatre in 2018
- Interactive map of Queens Theatre
- Address: Flushing Meadows–Corona Park; Flushing, Queens, New York; United States
- Coordinates: 40°44′38.98″N 73°50′39.92″W
- Type: Regional theater

Construction
- Opened: 1964
- Architects: Philip Johnson and Richard Foster

Website
- queenstheatre.org

Queens Theatre, formerly Queens Theatre in the Park and before that Queens Playhouse, is an American professional theatre at Flushing Meadows–Corona Park in Queens, New York City, United States. Artistic and Executive Directors have included Joseph S. Kutrzeba, founder and producer; Robert Moss, Sue Lawless, Jeffrey Rosenstock and Ray Cullom, formerly Managing Director of Long Wharf Theatre in New Haven, Connecticut, and since 2011, Taryn Sacramone, former Executive Director of Astoria Performing Arts Center.

== History ==
Attractions and geographical features of Flushing Meadows–Corona Park
Attractions and geographical features of Flushing Meadows–Corona Park:
1 Citi Field
2 Etihad Park (under construction)
3 Flushing Meadows Carousel and Queens Zoo
4 Flushing Meadows Corona Park Aquatics Center
5 Flushing River and Creek
6 Meadow Lake and Hong Kong Dragon Boat Festival
7 Metropolitan Park (planned) and Shea Stadium (demolished)
8 Mets–Willets Point subway station
9 Mets–Willets Point LIRR station
10 National Tennis Center and United States Pavilion (demolished)
11 New York Hall of Science
12 New York State Pavilion and Queens Theatre
13 Queens Botanical Garden
14 Queens Museum
15 Queens Night Market
16 Terrace on the Park
17 Unisphere
18 Willow Lake
19 World's Fair subway station (demolished)

Adapted from the former Theaterama at the 1964 New York World's Fair, the theater was part of Philip Johnson's then $6 million construction project that also included observation towers and an open-air pavilion called the "Tent of Tomorrow." The theater was originally decorated with the artwork of Andy Warhol and Robert Indiana. The theater is next to the Unisphere at Flushing Meadows–Corona Park, an area that also includes Citi Field, the Queens Museum of Art, and the USTA Billie Jean King National Tennis Center.

Johnson and Richard Foster designed the original theater. The audience stood and viewed a travelog of New York State projected on screens lining the inside of the circular room. The showing of a cycloramic (360 degrees) film about New York State was a tribute to the world fair's host city. The surround cinema was converted into a multipurpose "legitimate" theater in the 1970s, requiring the addition of a stage, public restrooms, lobby, dressing rooms, and stage house.

=== 1972–1975 ===
The Queens Playhouse, as it was called upon opening in 1972, was founded by Joseph S. Kutrzeba. In 1965, it was originally in a lumberyard in Bayside, Queens, and was the first nonprofit professional resident theater in Queens. In 1972, the theatre became live entertainment from previously being a movie theatre. Their first production in the new theater was George Bernard Shaw's Pygmalion. The theatre suffered financial setbacks in 1974, Kutrzeba blaming a lack of support by the New York State Council on the Arts and the Queens Cultural Association. In November 1974, Kutrzeba left Queens Theatre to pursue a career as a Broadway producer with The Lieutenant, a musical based on the trials resulting from the Mỹ Lai Massacre. The production had started at the Queens Playhouse before it moved to Broadway where it was nominated for a Tony Award for Best Musical but closed after a short run.

=== 1985–93 conversion ===
The circular theater closed in 1985. A $4 million project converted it into a 476-seat community theater, designed by architect Alfredo De Vido, opened in 1993. The conversion was a "wonderful success" according to Queens Borough President Claire Shulman, who said she was an attendee at the 1939 World's Fair (held at the same site) as a little girl.

It became known as the Queens Theatre in the Park. The theater is now used for cabaret, concerts, Broadway revivals, new productions, and film festivals. The playhouse hosts various drama, dance, music, performance art, troupe, and comedy performances as well as children’s events. The theater has been a venue for the Independent Film Showcase and is intended to meet the various interests of the diverse population of Queens. The work completed in 1993 improved acoustics and added a public elevator, additional lighting and rigging, "front-of-house catwalks", and reworked the facades. The original dome was strengthened and a second roof added, abating noise from nearby LaGuardia Airport. A 100-seat "flexible studio theater" was also added in the downstairs "for more experimental fare".

In 1993 the famed Kitty Carlisle Hart was hostess at a Queens Theatre in the Park gala held at Terrace on the Park. The operators of the theater have been listed as a nonprofit since 1997. A member of the Cultural Institutions Group, it is funded in part from the New York City Department of Cultural Affairs.

During the 1996–97 season it had attendance of 90,000 people at more than 300 performances of theater, music, dance, children's shows and workshops, films and festivals. In an effort to reach Latinos, a Latin American festival was hosted. The 1964–1965 New York World's Fair New York State Pavilion was listed on the National Register of Historic Places in 2009.

=== 2008–09 addition ===
A 2008–09 addition, designed by Caples Jefferson Architects with Lee/Timchula Architects, added a reception hall. A transparent circular pavilion, it is said to be "especially dramatic at twilight, when the sunset-colored, invert dome appears to hover and flow in the dark."

A 600-person "nebula" reception space was part of the restoration. This renovation was awarded the 2011 Architectural Lighting Light & Architecture Design Award.

In 2009, the theater was added to the National Register of Historic Places as one of the three qualifying structures that make up the New York State Pavilion from the 1964 New York World's Fair.

=== 2021 film project ===
On April 22, 2021, the experimental film project "I See You And You See Me" premiered at the Queens Theatre. Based on "testimonies of borough residents as they contended with the early days of the pandemic," curated by the Queens Memory Project, "I See You And You See Me" was directed by Harris Doran and starred Deirdre Lovejoy, Deborah S. Craig, Pooya Mohseni, Khalid Rivera, James Seol, and others. Contributing writers included Harris Doran, Douglas Lyons, Kaffy Abdul, Seo-Young Chu, Sto Len, and Sheena Pachon.

== Building ==
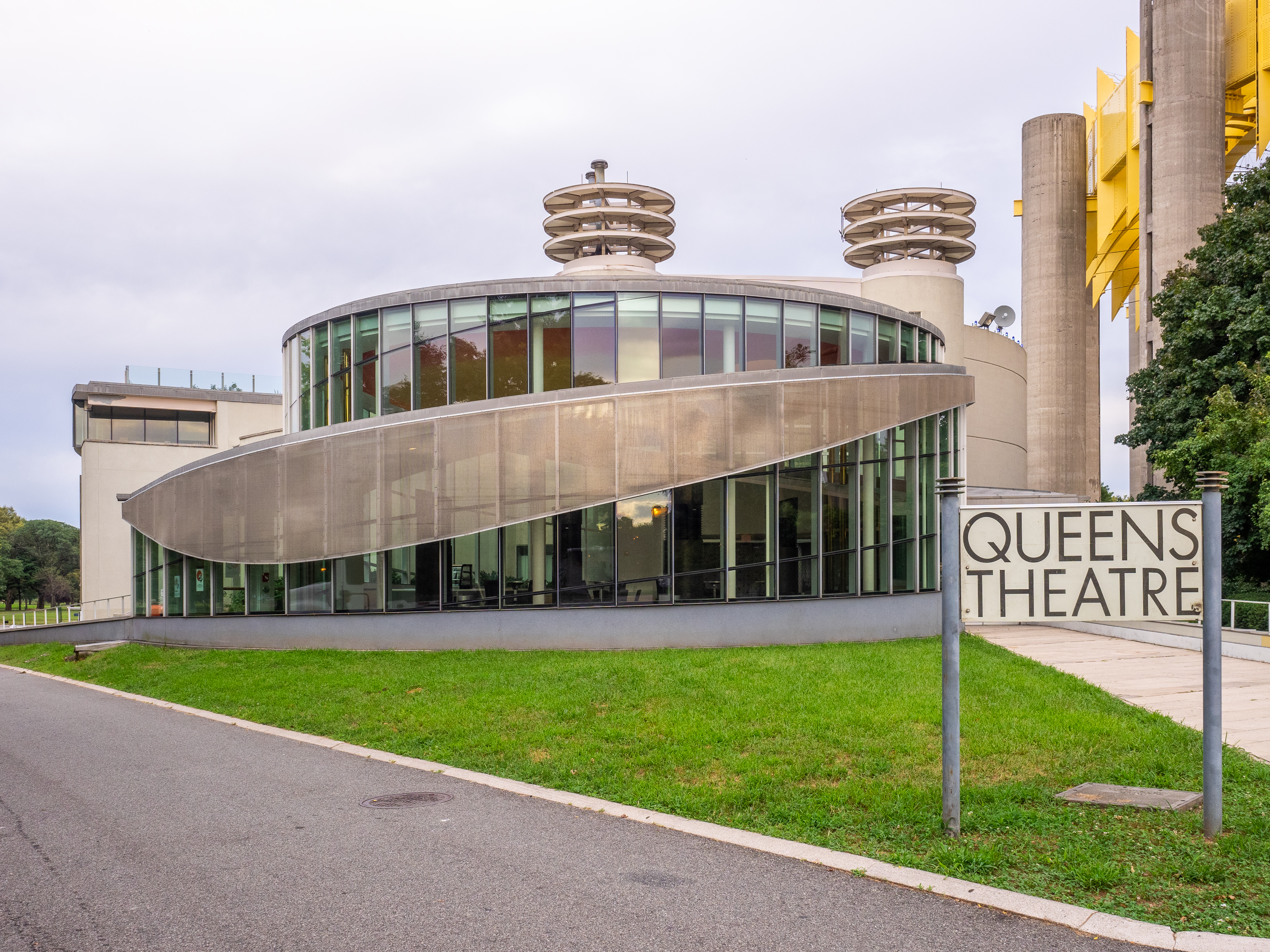
The Queens Theatre, occupying the former Theaterama

The original part of the Theaterama is a reinforced-concrete cylindrical structure, which measures 100 feet (30 m) across and 44 feet (13 m) high. This structure surrounds a reinforced-concrete "inner drum", which holds the main auditorium. Since 1989, the Theaterama has housed the Queens Theatre, a performing arts center that produces theater, dance, and children's and cultural programming.

=== Exterior ===
The theater building's facade originally contained rectangular openings at ground level, which have been variously infilled with masonry or glass bricks. The exterior was originally wainscoted with steel beams. There were three doorways to the building on the western facade. Between the window openings were medallions with an outline of New York state's borders. Above the medallions were yellow-and-white lamps, some of which still exist in the 21st century. To the southeast was a brick-paved terrace, accessed by a concrete stairway that descended to a lower-level gallery.

On the upper stories are setbacks around the perimeter of the structure, which double as service walkways. The Theaterama was originally topped by a wooden dome. Globe-shaped blue lamps were placed around the dome as well. The wooden dome was covered with an aluminum dome in the early 1990s, upon which the blue globe-shaped lamps were removed.

After the Theaterama was converted into a venue for the Queens Theatre, three structures were added to the original cylindrical massing during the early 1990s and late 2000s. A lobby with a glass-brick facade was built in the 1990s renovation. It is accessed by a doorway to the northwest, which is flanked by a pair of concrete pylons. The pylons flank a segmental arch, and there are lamps with metal tiers at the top of each pylon. Another cylindrical annex was built in the 2000s by the firm of Caples Jefferson. This annex, known as the "nebula", is located northwest of the relocated main entrance and contains a flat roof, as well as a glass facade with a diagonal ramp-shaped structure around it. There are also a pair of two-story structures to the north, which have a concrete facade. These structures contain offices and performance spaces. The larger structure is to the east and contains a terrace on its western facade, as well as sash windows.

=== Interior ===
The modern theater is accessed through the "nebula" annex. The nebula contains a reception space with a curved ceiling (which is painted yellow with red edges) and a skylight. There are windows around the reception area, which overlook the other pavilion structures. The nebula also includes a 75-seat cabaret room, a catering space, and back of house functions. Within the original structure, a circulation corridor runs between the facade and the "inner drum". The original entrance to the theater's main auditorium, a red oak door, is still extant. There are two mezzanine levels with walls made of concrete masonry units and plain concrete. On the second story is a projection booth for the main auditorium. When the theater was built, steep staircases led from the eastern side of the ground-level corridor to the mezzanines.

The inner drum of the theater contains the main auditorium, officially known as the Claire Shulman Playhouse since 2002. During the 1964 World's Fair, the auditorium was used to display 360-degree films, and there were wooden battens on the wall, which were intended to help with navigation within the auditorium. Following a 1972 renovation by Peter Howard, the main auditorium was converted into a 500-seat venue with a partial thrust stage. The seating area was reconfigured into 14 rows. The existing seats were replaced in 1993 with red velvet seats, salvaged from a former Loews cinema in Manhattan. After Caples Jefferson renovated the theater in 2009, the main auditorium was expanded to 600 seats. The modern main auditorium has a catwalk, acoustic wall panels, and raked seating. Parts of the inner drum wall have been removed to accommodate the stage.

The theater's lower level had exhibition space for visual art, as well as service rooms, during the World's Fair. The exhibit space had a coffered ceiling and wall partitions, parts of which are still extant in the 21st century. Offices, rehearsal space, and offices were built below the auditorium in the 1972 renovation; the office space was located in the southeastern portion of the lower level. Part of the lower-level space became a 100-seat lower auditorium for experimental theater in 1993. The lower auditorium was expanded to 125 seats following the 2009 renovation, and an elevator to the northeast was added around the same time.

== In popular culture ==
The exterior of the pavilion was used in the musical film The Wiz (1978), directed by Sidney Lumet; and the final scene of the science-fiction, action comedy film Men in Black (1997), directed by Barry Sonnenfeld.

== See also ==
- List of buildings, sites, and monuments in New York City
