= Joseph S. Kutrzeba =

Polish-American theater producer and director

- Born: Arie Fajwiszys; October 11, 1927; Łódź, Poland
- Died: January 24, 2013 (aged 85); New York, United States
- Education: Yale Drama School
- Occupations: theater producer and director
- Spouse(s): Valerie M. Hageman (1955–1959); Michaela Lacher (from 1979)
- Children: Karen Janina
- Parents: Israel (father); Malka (mother)

Joseph S. Kutrzeba (born Arie Fajwiszys; October 11, 1927 – January 24, 2013) was a Polish-American theater producer and director.

== Family background: Israel Fajwiszys and Kutrzeba's early life ==
Kutrzeba was born on October 11, 1927, in Łódź, Poland. He was the son of Israel Fajwiszys, a composer, and Malka (Hakman) Fajwiszys, both of whom perished in the Holocaust, along with their daughter, Kutrzeba's sister. Israel Fajwiszys was born in 1887 in Yampil, Ukraine. Having graduated from a music conservatoire, he led the choirs of the progressive synagogues in Brody and Tarnów. After studying in Vienna, he was also the leader of the Kraków Tempel Synagogue choir. He came to Łódź from Lviv in 1922 and he became a teacher in both girls' and boys' schools of the Jewish Secondary Schools Society. He was the co-organiser of a singing society "Szir". After the outbreak of World War II he moved to Warsaw, where he volunteered to help an underground military organisation. In the ghetto, with Kutrzeba, he organised a children's choir. Kutzreba's father Israel wrote the music to the poem M'khol Masada by Yitskhok Lamden. In 1937 Israel's girls' chorus won first prize in an all-Poland choral competition. Later in the Warsaw Ghetto, he would lead the children's choir in performances of the song recounting the Jewish resistance and sacrifice under Roman rule.

During the ghetto uprising he was caught and transported together with his daughter to the extermination camp in Poniatowa in the Lublin area, where he was murdered.

== War and post-war life in Europe ==
Kutrzeba was a member of a teenage resistance group in the Warsaw Ghetto Uprising. He escaped and met a priest, Reverend Stanisław Falkowski, who gave him the patriotic Polish name of Joseph Kutrzeba. He found him work as a cowherd with neighboring farmers and helped him get Catholic ID papers. In 1977 Falkowski was honored by Yad Vashem, the international Holocaust heroism remembrance authority.

Kutrzeba wrote in his memoir in May 1994: "During the first days of September 1942, at the age of 14, I jumped out of a moving train destined for Treblinka, through an opening (window) of a cattle car loaded to capacity with Jews from the Warsaw Ghetto. Wandering over fields, forests and villages, at first in the vicinity of Wołomin, and later of Zambrów, I found myself, in late November, in the area of Hodyszewo (near Łomża). Throughout my wandering, the peasants for the most part were amenable to put me up for the night and to feed me—some either suspecting my origins or pressing me to admit it."

He attended L.M. University in Munich, Germany (B.A. equivalent) and at age 19 was the winner of the top literary prize for a World War II short story sponsored by the Polish Combatant Association in London.

== Emigration to the USA and later life ==
Kutrzeba came to the United States in 1950 and served with the U.S. Army in the Korean War (5 decorations; 2 battle stars) and graduated from Yale Drama School in 1956 on 3 scholarships (M.F.A) and N.Y.U (Ph.D.) in 1974.

He was the founder and producer of Queens Playhouse at Flushing Meadow and produced 10 plays.

He was nominated for a Tony Award and a Drama Desk Award for best producer of the rock opera The Lieutenant. Kutrzeba remarked that the reason he decided to produce The Lieujtenant was "The show meant a lot to me on human values. I think the theme is one of cardinal importance to our times: The concept of obedience versus exercising one's own conscience." He won the Bronze Award in the International Film and TV Festival in New York for the documentary film "Children in the Holocaust" with Liv Ullmann, 1980 (English and Polish versions). He produced Helena: the Emigrant Queen, 1996 at La Mama and Kosciuszko Foundation. He is the author of the book The Contract: A Life for a Life.

Kutrzeba was married twice, the first time to Valerie M. Hageman, from September 1955 to 1959, with one child, Karen Janina. He was married again on January 14, 1979, to Michaela Lacher.

He recorded his oral history on May 18, 1995, for the United States Holocaust Memorial Museum

Kutrzeba died on January 24, 2013, in New York, at the age of 85.
