= Mario J. Cariello =

American lawyer, politician, and judge (1907–1985)

Justice of the New York Supreme Court
- In office 1968–1977

14th Borough President of Queens
- In office January 2, 1963 – January 1, 1969
- Preceded by: John T. Clancy
- Succeeded by: Sidney Leviss

Member of the New York State Assembly from Queens County's 1st district
- In office 1936–1941
- Preceded by: Harold J. Crawford
- Succeeded by: Charles J. Dalzell

Personal details
- Born: Mario Joseph Cariello; January 23, 1907 Manhattan, New York City, U.S.
- Died: August 9, 1985 (aged 78) Manhattan, New York City, U.S.
- Resting place: Calvary Cemetery, Woodside, Queens
- Party: Democratic
- Spouse: Lee Pallante
- Education: New York Law School (LL.B.)
- Occupation: Lawyer, politician, judge

Mario Joseph Cariello (January 23, 1907 – August 9, 1985) was an American lawyer, Democratic politician, and judge from Queens, New York City. He served in the New York State Assembly, as Borough President of Queens, and as a justice of the New York Supreme Court.

== Early life and education ==
Cariello was born on January 23, 1907, in Manhattan, New York City, to Italian immigrant parents who had arrived from Sorrento, Italy, in 1904. In 1911, the family moved to Queens, where he attended public schools. He was a 1924 graduate of Newtown High School in Elmhurst.

He attended Fordham University and then graduated from New York Law School in 1930. He was admitted to the bar in 1931 and practiced law in New York City.

== Political career ==
Cariello was a member of the New York State Assembly (Queens County, 1st District) from 1936 to 1941, serving in the 159th, 160th, 161st, 162nd, and 163rd legislatures. He resigned his seat on September 25, 1941.

== Judicial career ==
In 1941, Cariello was elected as a judge of the Municipal Court in Queens, a position he held until 1962. He was re-elected in 1951 and 1961.

== Borough President of Queens ==
On January 2, 1963, Mayor Robert F. Wagner swore Cariello in as Borough President of Queens, after the City Council selected him to fill the vacancy caused by the resignation of John T. Clancy. He won a special election later that year to serve the remainder of the term and was re-elected in 1965.

During his tenure, Cariello helped the borough prepare for the 1964–65 World's Fair in Flushing Meadows. He was an advocate for improved transportation and other public projects to benefit Queens, and frequently disagreed with City Hall over what he saw as attempts to consolidate powers to the detriment of the borough presidents. He unsuccessfully sought weighted voting on the Board of Estimate to give populous Queens additional influence over the city budget.

In 1964, Cariello protested to his colleagues on the Board of Estimate that Queens was being mistreated on zoning matters, leading to the unanimous rejection of three zoning proposals that he argued would bring deterioration to the neighborhoods involved.

In 1966, Cariello organized a "familiarization tour" by bus through Queens to acquaint city officials with his "burgeoning borough."

== New York Supreme Court ==
Cariello stepped down as Borough President when he successfully ran for a seat on the New York Supreme Court in 1968. He was succeeded by his deputy Borough President, Sidney Leviss.

Cariello served on the Supreme Court until his term expired in December 1977.

== Personal life and death ==
Cariello was married to Lee Pallante. He had a brother, William, of Bayside, Queens.

He died from cancer on August 9, 1985, at Memorial Sloan–Kettering Cancer Center in Manhattan, at the age of 78. He is entombed at Calvary Cemetery in Woodside, Queens.

New York State Assembly
Preceded by Harold J. Crawford	New York State Assembly; 1936–1941	Succeeded by Charles J. Dalzell
Political offices
Preceded by John T. Clancy	Borough President of Queens; 1963–1968	Succeeded by Sidney Leviss
