= Carl Deutschmann =

American politician from New York

Member of the New York State Assembly from Queens County's 1st District
- In office 1927–1929
- Preceded by: Henry M. Dietz
- Succeeded by: John O'Rourke

Personal details
- Born: 1888
- Party: Democratic
- Occupation: Swimming pool proprietor

Military service
- Allegiance: United States
- Branch/service: U.S. Army
- Battles/wars: World War I

Carl Deutschmann (born 1888 – date of death unknown) was an American politician, businessman, and military veteran from Queens, New York. He served as a member of the New York State Assembly from 1927 to 1929, representing Queens County's 1st District.

== Early life and military service ==
Carl Deutschmann was born in 1888. He served in the United States Army during World War I.

== Political career ==
Deutschmann, a Democrat, was elected to represent Queens County's 1st District in the New York State Assembly in 1926.

A survey of the 1927 legislature published by The New York Times noted that Deutschmann was one of the few members whose occupation was not law, farming, or real estate, listing him as a "swimming pool proprietor" from Queens. He was the proprietor of the North Beach swimming pool.

He ran for re-election in 1928, facing Republican Julius Branschweig and Socialist Edward Levinson.

== Later career and affiliations ==
After his service in the Assembly, Deutschmann remained active in Democratic politics. In 1945, he served as a member of the New York Democratic State Committee.

He was a member of several fraternal and veterans' organizations, including the Moose, the Eagles, the Freemasons, and the American Legion. His burial location is unknown.
