= Queens Botanical Garden =

Botanical garden in New York City

Coordinates: 40.7504°N 73.8288°W

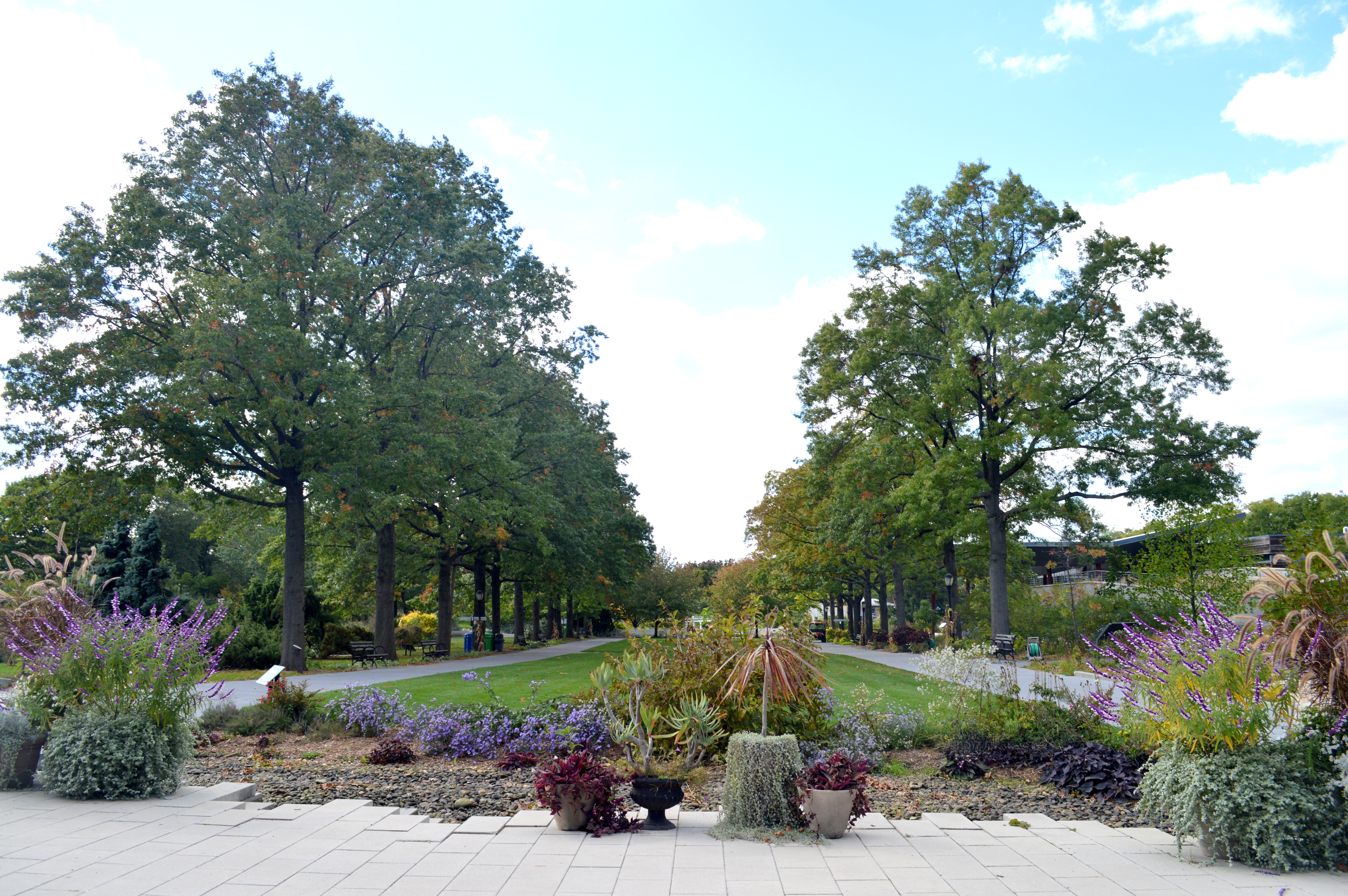
- Entrance Plaza
- Established: 1939
- Location: Queens, New York, United States
- Public transit access: Long Island Rail Road: Port Washington Branch Flushing–Main Street; New York City Subway: Flushing–Main Street; New York City Bus: Q20, Q44 SBS, Q58, Q98
- Website: queensbotanical.org

Queens Botanical Garden is a botanical garden located at 43-50 Main Street in the Flushing neighborhood of Queens in New York City, United States. The 39-acre (16 ha) site features rose, bee, herb, wedding, and perennial gardens; an arboretum; an art gallery; and a LEED-certified Visitor & Administration Building. Queens Botanical Garden is located on property owned by the City of New York, and is funded from several public and private sources. It is operated by Queens Botanical Garden Society, Inc.

Queens Botanical Garden was created as part of the 1939 New York World's Fair and was originally located in nearby Flushing Meadows–Corona Park. It moved to its current location, a landfilled area east of Flushing Meadows Park, in 1963 in preparation for the 1964 New York World's Fair. Since then, the Queens Botanical Garden has continued to expand, with programming targeted at residents of surrounding community. In 2001 the Queens Botanical Garden Society published a master plan for a renovation of the garden, centered around the garden's location above the underground Kissena Creek. Several improvements were made over the following years, including the construction of a new environmentally friendly parking lot and administration building.

== History ==
Attractions and geographical features of Flushing Meadows–Corona Park
Attractions and geographical features of Flushing Meadows–Corona Park:
1 Citi Field
2 Etihad Park (under construction)
3 Flushing Meadows Carousel and Queens Zoo
4 Flushing Meadows Corona Park Aquatics Center
5 Flushing River and Creek
6 Meadow Lake and Hong Kong Dragon Boat Festival
7 Metropolitan Park (planned) and Shea Stadium (demolished)
8 Mets–Willets Point subway station
9 Mets–Willets Point LIRR station
10 National Tennis Center and United States Pavilion (demolished)
11 New York Hall of Science
12 New York State Pavilion and Queens Theatre
13 Queens Botanical Garden
14 Queens Museum
15 Queens Night Market
16 Terrace on the Park
17 Unisphere
18 Willow Lake
19 World's Fair subway station (demolished)

=== Creation and site ===
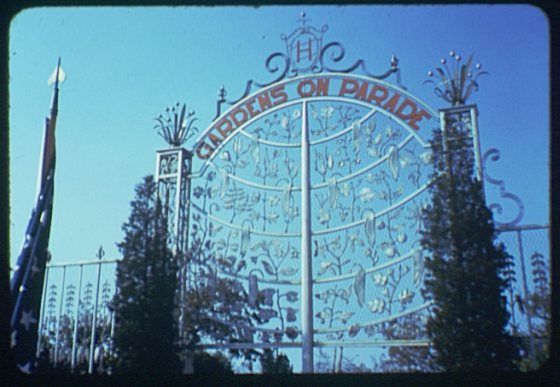
The gate leading into the Gardens on Parade during the 1939 New York World's Fair

During the 1939 New York World's Fair, held in adjacent Flushing Meadows–Corona Park, the future site of the Queens Botanical Garden was a horticultural exhibit of the fair called "Gardens on Parade" operated by Hortus, Incorporated. The original gardens were located just west of the modern site at the northeast corner of the fair grounds, at 131st Street between Lawrence Street and the Flushing River in the path of the future Van Wyck Expressway.

A New York City Department of Sanitation garage at Dahlia Avenue was located west of Main Street, in the modern Queens Botanical Garden. By the 1950s it had been abandoned, and there were calls to demolish it.

A playground located at Elder Avenue and 135th Street in what is now the Queens Botanical Garden, was originally set to be complete by March 1957. However, by March 11 only a comfort station and lights were constructed, while the site required significant filling before development could occur. According to the Parks Department, the project was delayed due to bad weather. The playground site was used as dumping ground, and it was filled with dirt after community petition. After a three-month delay, the playground was completed in June 1957.

=== Relocation ===
Prior to the 1964–1965 New York World's Fair, the western portion of Kissena Corridor Park between Lawrence Street / College Point Boulevard and Main Street adjacent to Flushing Meadows Park was leased to the World's Fair Corporation, along with most of Flushing Meadows. In 1961, as part of a $3 million development for the World's Fair, the Queens Botanical Garden was planned to be relocated from the fair grounds in Flushing Meadows to a site across College Point Boulevard to the east, within the current Kissena Corridor Park and adjacent to the World's Fair grounds. This tract was described as "35 acres (14 ha) of bogs and dump land". The project included a new administration building, to cost $150,000, and a pedestrian overpass over Lawrence Street leading to Flushing Meadows. The existing garden in Flushing Meadows would be demolished to make way for new fair exhibits, and the extension of the Van Wyck Expressway north through the park to the Whitestone Expressway. This site was originally planned to be used as parking space for the fair.

Grading work for the project began on March 22, 1961. The Board of Estimate approved the Botanical Garden project and other World's Fair projects on September 23, 1961. At the time, the work for the gardens was estimated to cost $341,700. Construction on the administration building began in 1962. The building was designed by the Brodsky, Hopf & Adler firm, which also designed terminals at Dallas/Fort Worth International Airport in Texas. Landscaping work was done by Gilmore David Clarke and Michael Rapuano, who also designed the original 1939 World's Fair grounds and the 1964 layout for the fair. The section of Elder Avenue that ran southwest across the Corridor Park site between Main Street and Peck Avenue was de-mapped to integrate the land into the Botanical Gardens. Three Blue Atlas Cedar trees were transplanted from the original garden site to the new main entrance on Main Street. The new Queens Botanical Garden was dedicated on October 19, 1963.

Following Queens Botanical Garden's completion, New York City Parks commissioner Robert Moses unveiled an expanded plan for Kissena Corridor. The plan also included the Queens Zoo, to be built adjacent to the Queens Botanical Garden and operated by the Queens Botanical Garden Society. The zoo was expected to be complete by spring 1967, but ultimately opened in October 1968.

=== Late 20th century ===
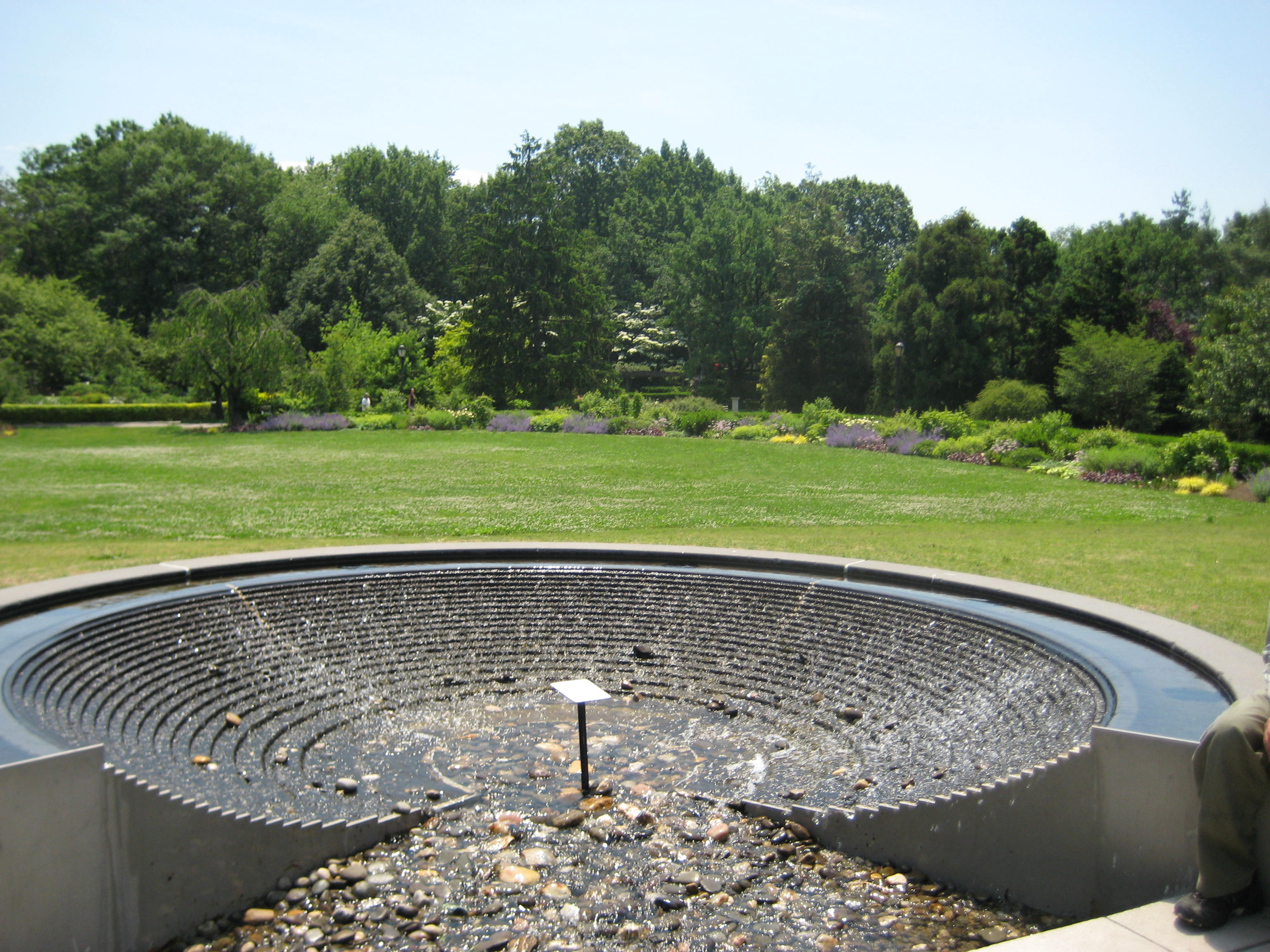
A fountain at Queens Botanical Garden

By 1972, the garden was averaging 300,000 visitors per year. The count included 50,000 students who had gone to the garden over the previous two years as part of various partnerships with Queens schools, or an average of 25,000 students annually. In the subsequent decades, the Queens Botanical Garden had various programs intended for members of the surrounding communities. In 1977, the garden hired a few dozen teenagers from schools in Queens to help plant trees, build a path, and restore part of an adjoining city park that had been vandalized. During the 1980s, the Queens Botanical Garden had several volunteers who would work with disabled teenagers. A sample of events from a 1979 newspaper article included an annual Environment Day and Senior Day; gardening classes; and a spring luncheon benefit. The Queens Botanical Garden had a senior garden, a children's garden, and community corn patches by 1982, as well as herb, bee, and bird gardens.

The city took control of Queens Botanical Garden in 1992 after the previous director and twenty board members were ousted due to a dereliction of duties. The Queens Botanical Garden Society regained control in 1993, and Susan Lacerte was appointed as the garden's executive director. Shortly afterward, the Queens Botanical Garden Society began offering programs to the substantial Chinese, Korean, and Latin American populations of Flushing. In 1997, it was announced that a formal Korean garden would be planted in recognition of the Korean population in Flushing, which numbered more than 60,000 at the time.

=== 21st-century additions ===
In 1998 Queens Botanical Garden Society began devising a master plan for the garden. Details of the plan were released in 2001. The project would convert much of the garden into a landscaped green space surrounding a watercourse, as well as add sustainable energy features that would allow the garden to retain all of the rainwater that it collected. The master plan was designed by BKSK Architects, Conservation Design Forum, and Atelier Dreiseitl. The $70 million cost would be paid for by the city and state governments, though at the time, funding from both governments was limited due to budget cuts. The following year, a fence was erected around the garden at a cost of $3.9 million. The arboretum at the west end of Queens Botanical Garden, which was formerly accessible after the rest of the garden had closed, was now within the limits of the fence. A renovation of the rest of the garden was also undertaken at a cost of $68 million. The additions included a green roof above one building, solar panels, geothermal power generation systems, stormwater collection systems, and new wetlands and water features.

On September 27, 2007, Queens Botanical Garden's new Visitor & Administration Building was opened. The center, designed by BKSK Architects, was the first building in New York City to achieve the "Platinum" LEED rating, the highest energy-efficiency rating possible. The new building was the first phase of the renovated garden to open. The renovation also included the construction of an environmentally friendly parking lot on the garden's north side, which was shaped around the surrounding land contours and contains a meadow that was designed to accommodate additional parking. In addition, an artificial wetland and "cleansing biotope" were constructed to collect stormwater in the garden.

The Bluestone Foundation donated $8 million to Queens Botanical Garden in January 2023, marking the largest donation in the garden's history. The funding was to be used for educational programs; following the donation, garden officials planned to erect a building for these programs. In March 2024, the office of U.S. Representative Grace Meng allocated $500,000 in federal funds for two new greenhouses at Queens Botanical Garden. The Queens Botanical Garden began constructing a new education center the next year for $34 million; this was partly funded by the Bluestone Foundation's 2023 grant.

== Description ==
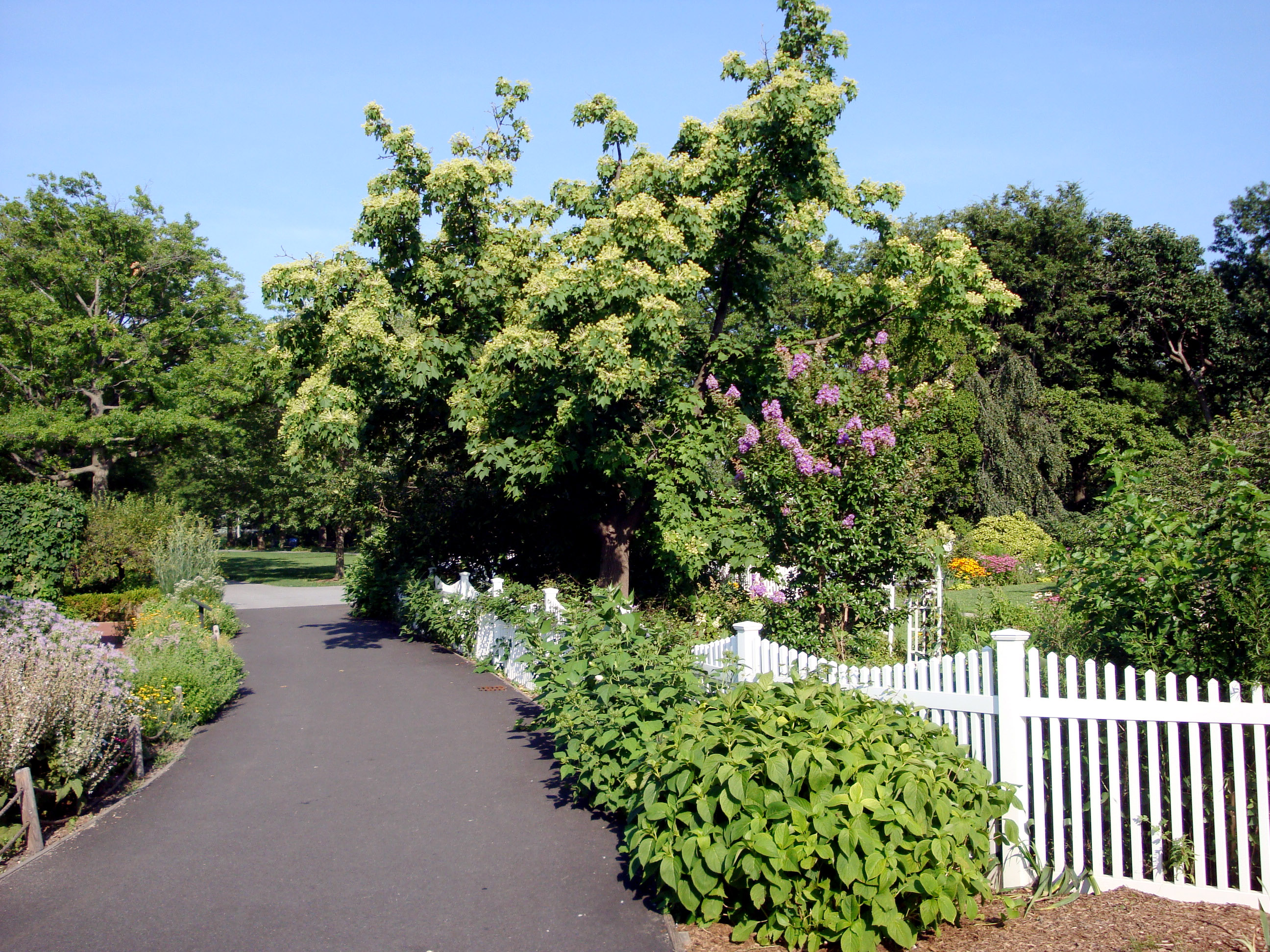
A pathway in Queens Botanical Garden

Queens Botanical Garden is situated on an irregularly shaped plot in southern Flushing, in the central section of the borough of Queens in New York City, United States. It comprises 39 acres (16 ha) of land bounded by Blossom Avenue, Cromellin Street, and Dahlia Avenue to the north; Main Street to the east; Peck, Elder, Booth Memorial Avenues and 133rd Street to the south; and College Point Boulevard to the west. Roughly 18 acres (7.3 ha) are dedicated to outdoor exhibits. The garden charges no admission fee from November to March; for the rest of the year, various admission rates are charged.

Queens Botanical Garden has a pedestrian entrance on Main Street, on its east side, and an entrance and parking lot at Cromellin Street, on its north side. The parking lot takes up much of the northwestern corner of Queens Botanical Garden. The visitor building and the gift shop and gallery are located on the north side of the Queens Botanical Garden. The majority of the public exhibits are located on the east side of the garden, where paths subdivide the land into smaller flower gardens. Various educational buildings, non-public structures, and the Compost Project Demonstration Site are located on the garden's north side. The Arboretum/Crabapple Grove and Meadow take up much of the southwest corner.

Queens Botanical Garden is located in a dip that is lower than the surrounding streets. Most of the garden is atop landfill, which in turn covers the former Kissena Creek. As a result, water tends to flow downward from nearby areas toward the garden, and sinkholes previously tended to form inside the Queens Botanical Garden. Because of these qualities, The New York Times called the site, "hydrologically speaking ... a drainage ditch". The 2001 master plan called for redesigning the garden around the dip, and included five "systems" with a total of 27 water features. As part of the master plan, a "cleansing biotope" was built across the northern side of the Queens Botanical Garden.

The site is often associated with the adjacent Flushing Meadows–Corona Park, to the west. Main Street separates the garden from Kissena Corridor Park to the east.

=== Administration building ===
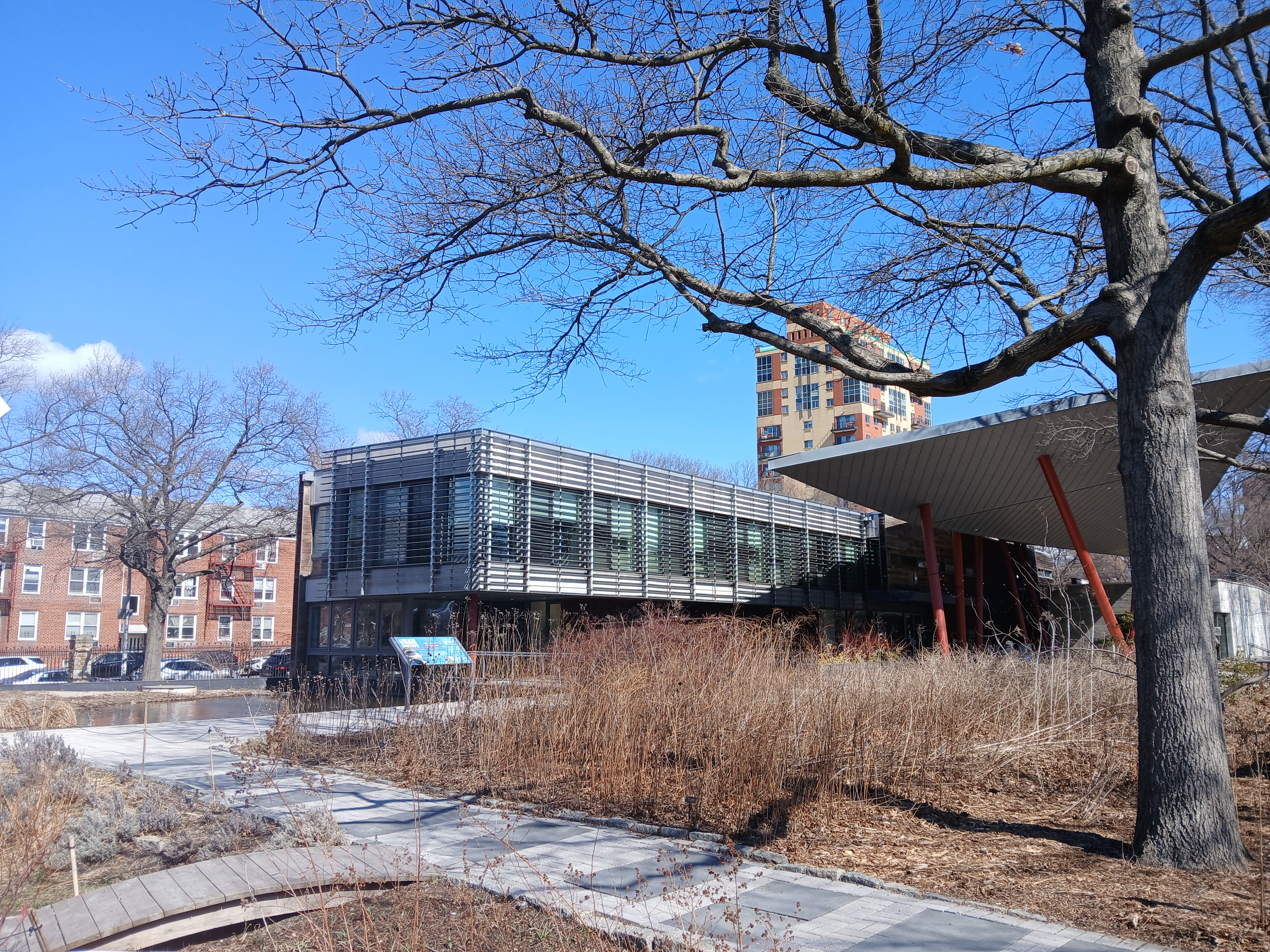
The Administration Building seen in 2025

The Visitor & Administration Building opened in 2007. The two-story, 15,800-square-foot (1,470 m^{2}) structure contains administrative offices and an auditorium. The center, designed by BKSK Architects, was the first public building in New York City to achieve the "Platinum" LEED rating, the highest energy-efficiency rating possible. It contained features such as geothermal heating, urinals that do not use water, and composting toilets. The Visitor and Administration Building also included a roof with three environmentally sustainable sections; one section contains solar panels; a second includes a rainwater collection system; and the last uses plants as insulation. These features were planned to reduce energy use by 40% compared to other buildings of similar size. The building was constructed by main contractor Stonewall Contracting Corporation at a cost of $12 million.

=== Farm & Compost Site ===
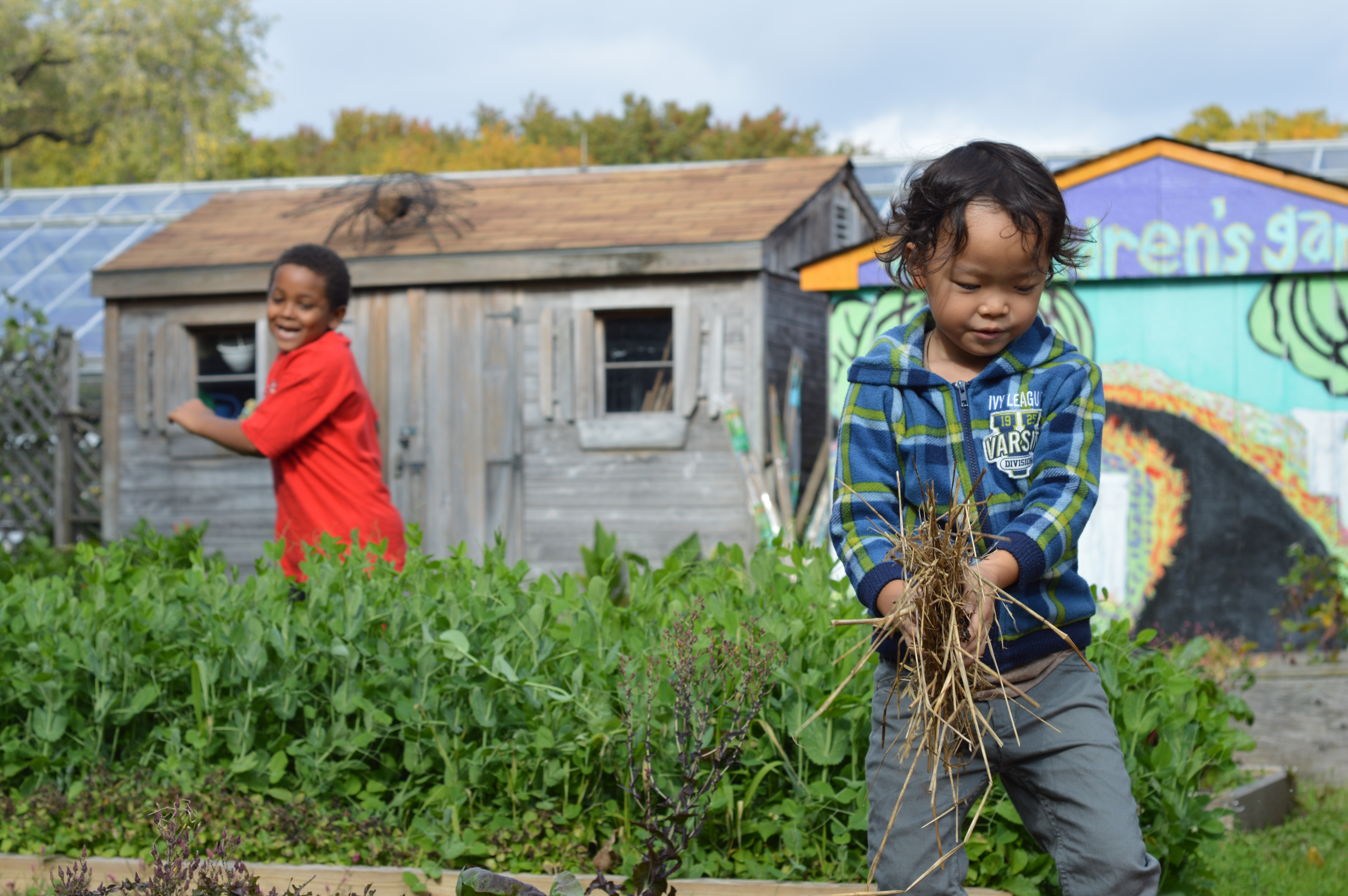
Children's garden

The Farm & Compost Site, respectively located at the southwestern and northwestern corners of the garden, showcases how to make and use compost to create healthy soil. It includes a compost bin display, one-acre farm, and pollinator habitat, that demonstrate how people can divert organic waste and improve urban soils. Vegetables grown on the farm are shared with intern and volunteers, and donated to emergency food relief programs. Crops include heirloom tomatoes, beans, turnips, and a variety of kale, lettuces, peppers, and radishes.

=== Other attractions ===
Queens Botanical Garden includes the Fragrance Walk, an outdoor walkway lined with flowers that is located near the Main Street entrance. There is also a Bee Garden near the center south portion of the garden.

=== Kissena Creek ===
Kissena Creek initially ran under the present-day sites of Kissena Park, Kissena Corridor Park, and Queens Botanical Garden before meeting Flushing Creek at what is now the Fountain of Planets / Pool of Industry in Flushing Meadows. In 1934, Kissena Creek was placed in a culvert at its crossing with Main Street (then called Jagger Avenue), as part of a widening project for the street. The rest of the creek was buried underground in the mid-20th century during Queens Botanical Garden's construction.

Today the remnants of Kissena Creek flow in a sewer underneath Kissena and Kissena Corridor parks and the Queens Botanical Garden. It merges with an outflow sewer under Kissena Corridor. The sewers flow west into the Flushing Bay Combined Sewer Outfall (CSO) Retention Facility, located in Flushing Meadows underneath the Al Oerter Recreation Center across to the west of the Queens Botanical Garden. The facility can hold up to 43.4 million US gallons (164 Ml) of water from overflows during storms, before pumping the water to the Tallman Island Waste Water Treatment Plant in College Point. Otherwise, the water empties into the Flushing River which flows north into Flushing Bay.

== Programs and events ==
Queens Botanical Garden hosts four seasons of public programming, including cultural celebrations and seasonal festivals such as Harvest Fest & Pumpkin Patch, Arbor Fest, and Taiwan: A World of Orchids. Previous events in the 2000s and 2010s included tours of the administration building conducted shortly after it opened, as well as various children's events during the falls and winters. In 2014 and 2015, to celebrate the 50th anniversary of the 1964 World's Fair, a model-train show was hosted at Queens Botanical Garden. In addition, during winters in the 2020s, Queens Botanical Garden hosted Luminosa: A Festival of Lights, a light show with more than a hundred illuminated sculptures.

Queens Botanical Garden's educational workshops and tours offer education to children, adults, and teachers through gardens. The Garden also hosts wedding ceremonies, receptions, and other private and corporate events. Queens Botanical Garden has a Victorian-style Wedding Garden designed specifically for weddings. However, registration is required to use the wedding garden and education building.

== Funding ==
The Queens Botanical Garden receives funding from several sources. In 2023 it had revenue of $13.7 million and expenses of $5.3 million. Most of the revenue came from governmental sources and capital campaigns; the rest was raised through fundraising events, memberships, and donations. The largest non-governmental donation was from HSBC Bank, which sponsored the Children's Garden. During the 1970s and 1980s, the city provided funding for about half of the garden's budget, and paid for all of the gardeners and maintenance workers. However, the city's allocation to Queens Botanical Garden decreased in the wake of the late-1970s New York City fiscal crisis, and funding was only restored in 1980 after significant outcry.

In 2005 Queens Botanical Garden was among 406 New York City arts and social service institutions to receive part of a $20 million grant from the Carnegie Corporation. This, in turn, was made possible through a donation by then-New York City mayor Michael Bloomberg.

== Transportation ==
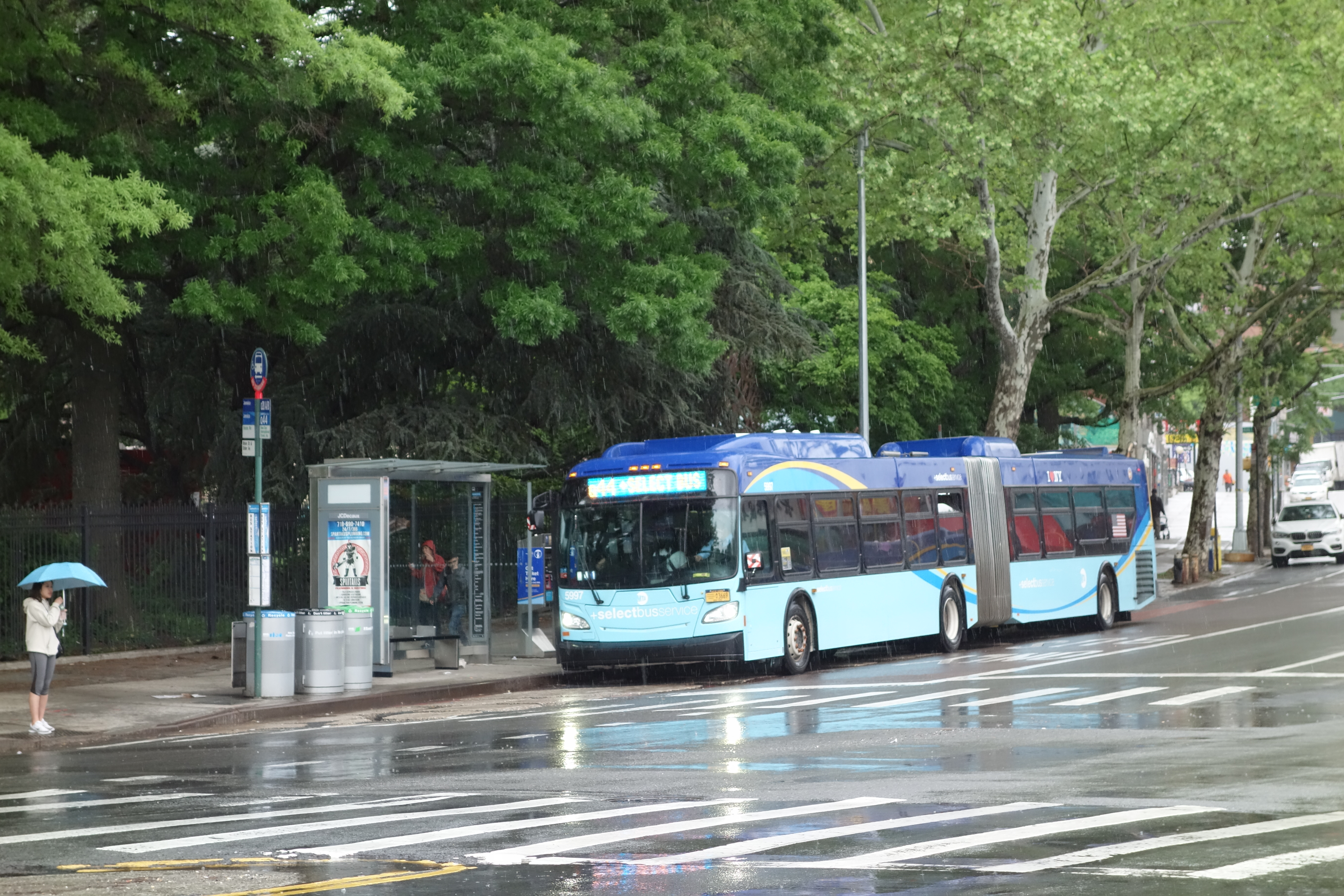
A Jamaica-bound Q44 SBS bus stopped in front of the Queens Botanical Garden

Several bus routes of MTA Regional Bus Operations operate in the vicinity of Queens Botanical Garden. The Q58 and Q98 bus routes operate at the far west end of the garden on College Point Boulevard. The Q20 and Q44 Select Bus Service routes run on Main Street at the east end of the Queens Botanical Garden.

The closest New York City Subway station to the park is Flushing–Main Street on Main Street and Roosevelt Avenue in Downtown Flushing, served by the 7 and <7> trains. Long Island Rail Road service on the Port Washington Branch is available at the LIRR station of the same name farther south on Main Street at Kissena Boulevard and 41st Avenue.

The Brooklyn–Queens Greenway formerly passed through the Queens Botanical Garden site via an overpass across College Point Boulevard, but that path has been closed off by the garden. As of 2025, plans are in development for improved pedestrian/cyclist access from both the west (from Flushing Meadows–Corona Park) and the east (from Kissena Park), with a path going around the south side of the garden.

== See also ==
- List of botanical gardens in the United States
