= Sidney Leviss =

New York Supreme Court Justice
- In office 1971–1993

15th Borough President of Queens
- In office January 3, 1969 – September 17, 1971
- Preceded by: Mario J. Cariello
- Succeeded by: Donald Manes

Personal details
- Born: July 21, 1917 Flushing, New York
- Died: September 7, 2007 (aged 90)
- Party: Democratic
- Spouse: Marion (died 2006)
- Children: 2
- Education: New York University School of Law (1941)

Sidney Leviss (July 21, 1917 - September 7, 2007) was a Democratic politician and judge from Queens, New York City.

== Biography ==
Leviss was born in Flushing, New York. He attended New York University and received a degree from the New York University School of Law in June 1941. Leviss was admitted to the New York State Bar in January 1942. The next day he joined the U.S. Army Air Corps to fight in World War II.

After the war he served as an assistant district attorney under T. Vincent Quinn, and later as deputy Queens borough president under Mario J. Cariello. He succeeded his boss and was elected Queens borough president in 1969. Leviss left the office mid-term on September 17, 1971 to take a seat on the New York Supreme Court. He retired from the bench at the age of 76, but was subsequently named a judicial hearing officer, a position he held until his death.

Leviss' wife Marion died in 2006. He was survived by two daughters, Jeanne and Nancy.

Political offices
Preceded by Mario J. Cariello	Borough President of Queens; 1969–1971	Succeeded by Donald Manes
