= Alexander Del Giorno =

American politician and judge (1900–1983)

Member of the New York State Assembly from Queens's 1st district
- In office January 1, 1945 – 1951
- Preceded by: Charles J. Dalzell
- Succeeded by: Thomas V. LaFauci

Judge of the New York Court of Claims
- In office 1957–1974 (Note: He retired in 1971 but was chosen to serve three and a half years longer by a special act of the Legislature.)

Personal details
- Born: February 28, 1900 Italy
- Died: November 19, 1983 (aged 83) Manhattan, New York City, U.S.
- Party: Democratic
- Children: 2
- Education: Columbia University; Fordham University School of Law (LL.B.)

Alexander Del Giorno (February 28, 1900 – November 19, 1983) was an American politician and judge from New York. A Democrat, he served in the New York State Assembly from 1945 to 1951, as a New York City magistrate from 1952 to 1957, and as a judge of the New York Court of Claims from 1957 to 1974.

== Early life and education ==
Del Giorno was born on February 28, 1900, in Italy. He immigrated to the United States in 1913. He graduated from Columbia University and received a law degree from Fordham University School of Law in 1924.

== Political career ==
Del Giorno, a Democrat, was elected to the New York State Assembly from Queens's 1st district in 1944 and took office on January 1, 1945. He succeeded Charles J. Dalzell and served until 1951, when he was appointed a city magistrate.

=== 1949 housing bill ===
In January 1949, Del Giorno and State Senator Seymour Halpern, both Queens Republicans (Note: The New York Times article describes them as "Queens Republicans," although Del Giorno was a Democrat. This may have been an error by the newspaper or a reference to their joint sponsorship of the bill.), sponsored a bill that would have given the State Housing Commissioner broad authority over federal and municipal housing projects. The proposal, which became known as the Halpern–Del Giorno bill, drew vigorous opposition from the New York City Housing Authority and civic groups. The sponsors ultimately killed the measure themselves by moving to strike out the enacting clause.

== Judicial career ==
=== City magistrate (1952–1957) ===
In January 1952, Mayor Vincent R. Impellitteri appointed Del Giorno as a city magistrate. His departure from the Assembly created a vacancy that was filled by Thomas V. LaFauci in a special election.

On January 12, 1952, Del Giorno was formally sworn in as a City Magistrate in Queens. After the ceremony, his automobile was crippled in an accidental collision caused by one of his well-wishers.

In May 1953, Mayor Impellitteri reappointed Del Giorno for a ten-year term as city magistrate.

In October 1954, Del Giorno presided over the case of a 24-year-old Queens secretary accused of twice trying to run down a detective. He dismissed the felonious assault charge, ruling that she had acted out of fear and misunderstanding, but found her guilty of dangerous driving.

In January 1954, when the Mid-Manhattan Magistrate's Court was closed after 90 years, Del Giorno delivered remarks on the function of the law, describing it as representing "the highest attribute of men's moral and spiritual development."

=== Court of Claims (1957–1974) ===
In March 1957, Governor Thomas E. Dewey appointed Del Giorno to the New York Court of Claims. He was reappointed in 1966.

He retired in 1971 but was chosen to serve three and a half years longer by a special act of the Legislature, finally leaving the bench in 1974.

== Later life and death ==
In 1974 and 1975, Del Giorno served as a consultant to the Legislative Commission on Eminent Domain in its recodification of the state's property laws affecting condemnation.

In 1977, he served on a commission appointed by the New York City Council to redraw councilmanic district lines.

Del Giorno died on November 19, 1983, at the Memorial Sloan–Kettering Cancer Center in Manhattan at the age of 83. He was survived by a daughter, Ida Canales, a son, Robert, and eight grandchildren.
