= Harold J. Crawford =

American politician, lawyer, and judge (1900–1973)

Justice of the New York Supreme Court
- In office 1960–1973

Member of the New York State Assembly from Queens County's 1st district
- In office 1933–1935
- Preceded by: John O'Rourke
- Succeeded by: Mario J. Cariello

Personal details
- Born: February 28, 1900 Manhattan, New York City, U.S.
- Died: June 16, 1973 (aged 73) Astoria, Queens, New York City, U.S.
- Party: Democratic
- Other political affiliations: Liberal
- Children: 2 daughters
- Education: Fordham Preparatory School; Fordham University; Fordham University School of Law (LL.B.)
- Occupation: Lawyer, politician, judge

Harold J. Crawford (February 28, 1900 – June 16, 1973) was an American politician, lawyer, and judge from New York City.

== Early life and education ==
Crawford was born on February 28, 1900, in Manhattan, New York City. He lived in Jamaica Estates, Queens, for much of his later life.

He graduated from Fordham Preparatory School, Fordham University, and Fordham University School of Law. He was admitted to the bar in 1923 and practiced law from 1923 to 1935.

== Political career ==
Crawford was elected to the New York State Assembly in 1933 as a Democrat-Liberal, representing Queens County's 1st District. He served from 1933 to 1935.

During his time in the Assembly, he co-sponsored the bills that created the Triborough Bridge and Tunnel Authority, the Queens-Midtown Tunnel Authority, and the Feld-Crawford Fair Trade Act. The Feld-Crawford Fair Trade Act, which became law in May 1935, permitted manufacturers of trademarked or branded goods to set minimum resale prices for retailers.

== Judicial career ==
In February 1935, Crawford was elected as a municipal court judge in Queens. He was re-elected in 1945 with bipartisan support. He subsequently served in both the Domestic Relations Court and the City Court.

In February 1958, Governor W. Averell Harriman appointed Crawford to fill a vacancy on the City Court in Queens. That same year, he was appointed an acting justice of the New York Supreme Court by the Appellate Division.

In 1960, Crawford was elected to the New York Supreme Court, where he served until his death in 1973.

== Civic and fraternal activities ==
Crawford was active in numerous civic and fraternal organizations in Queens. He was a past president and director of the Emerald Association of Long Island, an incorporator of the Queens Boys' Club, and a member of the Elks Club and the Ancient Order of Hibernians. He also served on the executive board of the Queens County Boy Scout organization, the Kiwanis Club, and the Queens Chamber of Commerce.

== Personal life and death ==
Crawford had two daughters: Mrs. John H. McCooey and Ann Crawford. He had three grandchildren.

He died on June 16, 1973, at Boulevard Hospital in Astoria, Queens, at the age of 72. He was buried at an unknown location.
