= Charles J. Dalzell =

American politician (1886–1948)

Member of the New York State Assembly from the Queens's 1st district
- In office 1942–1944
- Preceded by: Mario J. Cariello
- Succeeded by: Alexander Del Giorno

Member of the New York State Assembly from the Queens's 4th district
- In office 1945–1946
- Preceded by: William F. Bowe
- Succeeded by: George T. Clark

Personal details
- Born: October 7, 1886 Astoria, Queens, New York City, U.S.
- Died: January 24, 1948 (aged 61) Staten Island, New York City, U.S.
- Party: Democratic
- Spouse: Wilhelmina L. Clark (m. 1924)
- Children: 1
- Occupation: Politician, attorney

Military service
- Allegiance: United States
- Branch/service: United States Army
- Rank: Lieutenant
- Unit: Medical Corps
- Battles/wars: World War I

Charles J. Dalzell (October 7, 1886 – January 24, 1948) was an American politician from Queens, New York. A Democrat, he served in the New York State Assembly from 1942 to 1946.

== Early life and education ==
Dalzell was born on October 7, 1886, in Astoria, Queens, New York City, and lived there all his life.

== Military service ==
Dalzell served in the United States Army during World War I, attaining the rank of lieutenant in the Medical Corps.

== Career ==
For seventeen years, Dalzell served as an attaché in the office of the Queens District Attorney. He was also an executive member of the Santee Democratic Club of Forest Hills and Kew Gardens.

== Political career ==
Dalzell was first elected to the New York State Assembly in 1941 from Queens's Fourth District and took office in January 1942. His candidacy was briefly challenged by his Republican opponent, George T. Clark, who obtained a court order seeking to have Dalzell's name removed from the ballot, arguing that he had been nominated by the district's Democratic executive committee rather than the county committee. The challenge was ultimately unsuccessful.

He was re-elected in 1943 and served in the Assembly through 1946, representing the First District (1942–1944) and the Fourth District (1944–1946).

In January 1946, Dalzell co-sponsored with State Senator Frederic R. Coudert Jr., a Manhattan Republican, a bill proposed by the O'Dwyer administration to merge the Triborough Bridge Authority and the New York City Tunnel Authority into a single consolidated authority.

== Personal life ==
Dalzell married Wilhelmina L. Clark on November 26, 1924, in Queens. They had a daughter, Dorothea. He was a member of the American Legion.

== Death ==
Dalzell died on January 24, 1948, at Halloran Veterans Hospital on Staten Island after an eighteen-day illness. He was 61 years old.
