= John O'Rourke (New York politician) =

American politician and judge from New York

Member of the New York State Assembly from Queens County's 1st District
- In office 1930–1932
- Preceded by: Carl Deutschmann
- Succeeded by: Harold J. Crawford

Justice of the Municipal Court of New York City, Queens Borough, First District
- In office November 1932 – after 1941
- Preceded by: Henry G. Wengel

Personal details
- Party: Democratic

John O'Rourke was an American politician and judge from Queens, New York. He served as a member of the New York State Assembly from 1930 to 1932 and later as a Municipal Court Justice in Queens.

== Political career ==
O'Rourke, a Democrat, was elected to represent Queens County's 1st District in the New York State Assembly and served from 1930 to 1932.

In January 1932, O'Rourke refused to take the oath of office for the new legislative session to make himself available for appointment as a municipal court justice in Queens, a move believed to be the first of its kind in the state's history. Under the Constitution, legislators had fifteen days in which to take the oath, and a provision prohibited them from accepting a salaried appointment during the legislative term for which they were elected. O'Rourke had been mentioned as a possible successor to Henry G. Wengel, who had been elevated to the New York Supreme Court.

He was succeeded in the Assembly by Harold J. Crawford in 1933.

== Judicial career ==
After leaving the Assembly, O'Rourke was elected to the office of justice of the Municipal Court of the City of New York, Borough of Queens, First District, at the general election held in November 1932. He filled a vacancy created by the resignation of his predecessor, Henry G. Wengel.

In May 1938, O'Rourke faced possible disciplinary action by the Appellate Division for altering a court record. O'Rourke had changed the name of a defendant, Simon W. Gerson, a confidential adviser to Manhattan borough president Stanley M. Isaacs, to "Samuel W. Gilson" in a written opinion to shield Gerson from adverse publicity in a rent lawsuit. O'Rourke made the change at the request of another justice, Arthur P. McNulty.

The Appellate Division ultimately decided to withhold disciplinary action against O'Rourke, finding that "no harm was done" and describing his conduct as "heedless" but not corrupt.

In 1941, O'Rourke sought re-election but was defeated in the Democratic primary. He subsequently filed a lawsuit, O'Rourke v. Cohen, arguing that his term did not expire until December 1942, but the court ruled against him.
