= John O'Rourke (priest) =

Irish priest and historian

- Occupations: Priest; historian

John O'Rourke (1809–1887), was an Irish Roman Catholic priest and historian.

== Biography and works ==
O'Rourke was born in Ireland in 1809. He entered Maynooth College, a pontifical university near Dublin, in 1845. He was ordained a priest in 1849 and served in the Diocese of Dublin. During his time in the seminary he attended Repeal Association meetings and was present at Conciliation Hall when the Young Irelanders seceded from the larger association.

O'Rourke's first book was Holly and ivy for the Christmas holidays, published in 1853 under a pseudonym, Anthony Evergreen. The novel depicts the impoverishment of a Wicklow farming family by famine and a dishonest land agent; they are saved by a son's return from the California goldmines.

O'Rourke's best-known work is The history of the great Irish famine of 1847, with notices of earlier Irish famines (1875). It is partially based on eyewitness evidence. He is as critical of Sir Robert Peel as of Lord John Russell, since he believes the repeal of the corn laws was not merely irrelevant but positively harmful. He praises the protectionist Lord George Bentinck for advocating subsidies for railway building. O'Rourke's fiercest hostility, however, is reserved for the landlords. He states that the government was in a difficult situation and at least tried to help, while landlords ‘as a class’ did little or nothing.

O'Rourke died on 17 July 1887 at the presbytery in Maynooth.
