= Claire Shulman =

American politician and nurse (1926–2020)

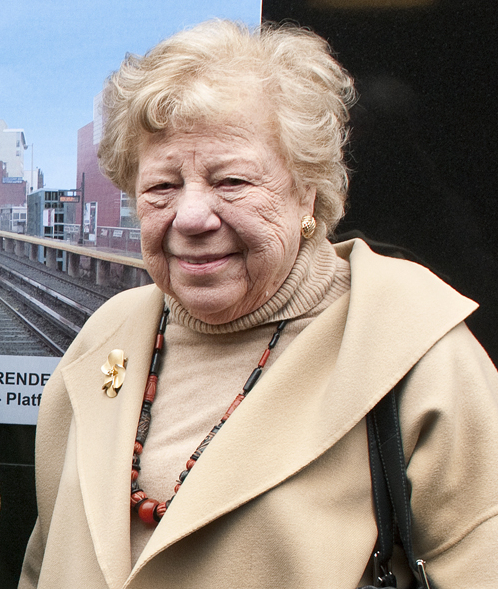
- Shulman in 2012

17th Borough President of Queens
- In office February 11, 1986 – January 1, 2002
- Preceded by: Donald Manes
- Succeeded by: Helen M. Marshall

Personal details
- Born: Claire Kantoff; February 23, 1926 Brooklyn, New York, U.S.
- Died: August 16, 2020 (aged 94) Queens, New York, U.S.
- Party: Democratic
- Spouse: Melvin Shulman
- Children: 3; including Ellen S. Baker
- Education: Adelphi University
- Occupation: Nurse, politician

Claire Shulman (née Kantoff; February 23, 1926 – August 16, 2020) was an American politician and registered nurse from New York City. She served as director of community boards and deputy president of Queens Borough, before becoming interim borough president in 1986 when her predecessor resigned due to scandal. Shulman proceeded to serve in the role full-time and won four elections between 1986 and 2002. She was the first woman to hold the position.

== Early life ==
Shulman was born in Brooklyn on February 23, 1926. She graduated from Adelphi University and was a registered nurse before getting into politics. She met her future husband, Mel Shulman, a doctor, while both were working at Queens Hospital Center.

== Career ==
Shulman first became involved in community life when she joined the Bayside Mother's Club in 1955. She was active in Queens community affairs and was appointed to a community board in 1966, eventually going on to become its chairwomen. She subsequently became Queens borough president Donald Manes' director of community boards in 1972 and his deputy in 1980. She took office initially as acting Borough President on February 11, 1986, after the scandal-tarred Manes, who later committed suicide, resigned. She was elected Borough President by a unanimous vote of the nine New York City Council members from Queens on March 12. She was then elected by popular vote to the remaining three years of Manes' term later that year and to four-year terms again in 1989, 1993, and 1997. She was unable to run for re-election in 2001 because of term limits, and was succeeded by Helen Marshall on January 3, 2002.

Shulman was noted for her passionate advocacy on issues including economic development, airport disputes, and the environment. For instance, she secured funding for the construction of Queens Hospital Center, as well as for 30,000 more school places for students. She also mediated a compromise with the board in 1987, when it voted in favor of a key city rezoning proposal that would spur the construction of middle-income apartment blocks. Neighborhoods made up of mostly single-family detached homes were against the proposal, and Shulman obtained an exemption for twelve such areas in Queens.

== Affiliations ==
Shulman served as a member of the boards of directors of New York Hospital Queens and St. Mary's Healthcare System for Children. She also assisted the Queens Zoo in obtaining its first bald eagle. The zoo's current bald eagles, Mel and Claire II, are named after Shulman and her husband.

== Later life ==
Shulman established Flushing Willets Point Corona Local Development Corporation, and served as its president and CEO when it aggressively lobbied the New York City Council in 2007 and 2008 to approve controversial legislation that would remove all of the existing private property owners and 250 industrial businesses from the neighborhood of Willets Point, Queens, for redevelopment. She was found to have conducted the lobbying for more than one year without filing any of the required public disclosures. An investigation by the City Clerk's Lobbying Bureau led to it imposing a fine of $59,090 against Shulman's LDC, which was a then-record penalty on a New York City lobbyist. However, Mayor Michael Bloomberg came to her defense, characterizing this as a "cheap shot" against her and adding that "these groups are designed to lobby. I don’t know if they technically broke the law". On a state level, then-Attorney General Andrew Cuomo and his successor, Eric Schneiderman investigated Shulman's lobbying campaign over a three-year period. Schneiderman eventually found that Shulman's LDC indeed “flouted the law by lobbying elected officials, both directly and through third parties, to win approval of … favored projects”.

== Personal life ==
During the last years of her life, she and her husband, Melvin Shulman, lived in Beechhurst, Queens, New York. They had one daughter, Ellen S. Baker, an astronaut and a veteran of three Space Shuttle voyages, including one that docked with the Russian space station Mir. Their son, Lawrence Shulman, a medical oncologist, is chief medical officer at the Dana–Farber Cancer Institute in Boston, Massachusetts. Their adopted son, Kim Shulman, who worked as an assistant director on television series including Party of Five and films including Honey, We Shrunk Ourselves, died from a cerebral hemorrhage on June 2, 2001.

=== Health and death ===
Shulman survived breast cancer and lost both her breasts in separate mastectomies. She died on August 16, 2020, at her home in Beechhurst, Queens. She was 94 and suffered from lung cancer and pancreatic cancer in the time leading up to her death. Before her death, she endorsed Donovan Richards for the 2020 Queens Borough presidency.

Political offices
Preceded by Donald Manes	Borough President of Queens; 1986–2002	Succeeded by Helen Marshall
