= Donald Manes =

American politician (1934–1986)

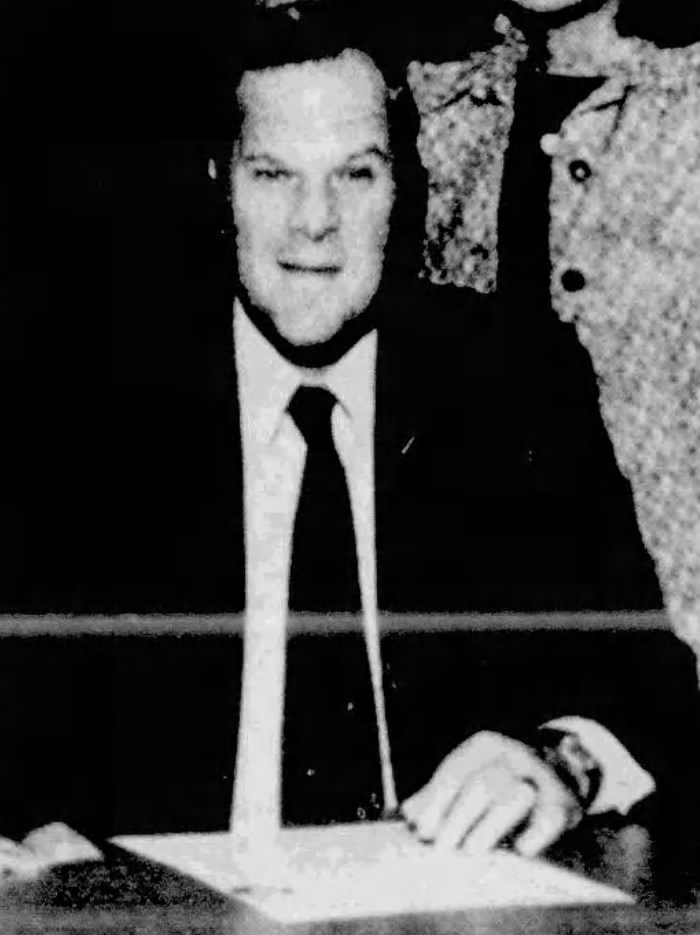
- Manes in 1977

16th Borough President of Queens
- In office September 17, 1971 – February 11, 1986
- Preceded by: Sidney Leviss
- Succeeded by: Claire Shulman

Member of the New York City Council from the 15th district
- In office 1966–1971
- Preceded by: Julius Moskowitz
- Succeeded by: Morton Povman

Personal details
- Born: January 18, 1934 Brooklyn, New York, U.S.
- Died: March 13, 1986 (aged 52) New York City, U.S.
- Party: Democratic
- Spouse: Marlene Manes
- Children: 3
- Education: Hofstra University (BBA); Brooklyn Law School (LLB)

Donald R. Manes (/ˈmænɪs/, /-əs/; January 18, 1934 – March 13, 1986) was a Democratic Party politician from New York City. He served as borough president of the New York City borough of Queens from 1971 until just before his suicide while under suspicion of corruption in 1986.

== Career ==
Manes was born in Brooklyn. He moved to Queens with his family as a teenager. He graduated from Erasmus Hall High School in Brooklyn. He briefly attended New York University before earning a degree in business administration from Hofstra University. In 1957, he received his LL.B. from Brooklyn Law School.

Following his admission to the New York bar, Manes was employed as a Queens County assistant district attorney under the aegis of Frank D. O'Connor, later serving as an associate counsel to New York State Assembly member Moses M. Weinstein during his successful battle to become the legislative body's majority leader in 1965. That same year, he was elected to the New York City Council, becoming the youngest member of its Queens delegation from a Jamaica Estates-based district. He ultimately ascended to the chair of the Council's Housing Committee and emerged as a protégé of influential Councilman Matthew Troy, a strident opponent of then-Mayor John Lindsay who became chair of the Queens Democratic Party in 1971.

Elected to his final role at the behest of Troy when he was 37, Manes was the youngest borough president in Queens history. During his tenure, Manes transformed his position from a mid-level policymaking role (although the borough presidents held influential seats on the now-defunct New York City Board of Estimate, incumbents generally served as proxies for county party leaders) into a more proactive political job, capitalizing on Queens's historic lack of a robust Democratic political machine in the mold of Manhattan's Tammany Hall or the storied clubhouse scenes in Brooklyn and the Bronx. In 1974, Mayor Abe Beame worked with Manes to arrange Troy’s ouster as Queens Democratic leader, with Manes assuming the role for the remainder of his life. Troy had angered Manes when he supported Howard J. Samuels against eventual incumbent Hugh Carey in the 1974 Democratic gubernatorial primary. Manes was re-elected four more times through the turn of the decade, also serving as a delegate to the 1980 Democratic National Convention during this period.

His popularity plummeted in late 1985, when he was criticized over two of his pet projects. He wanted to build a Grand Prix auto racetrack in Queens's largest public park, Flushing Meadows-Corona Park, where the 1939 New York World's Fair and the 1964 New York World's Fair had been held. Community leaders denigrated the idea, and it became the first major project of his that was opposed. Also that year, Manes worked to build a domed football-baseball stadium in the park, but it was opposed by local businessmen in the Flushing area. When Queens couldn't secure a football franchise, the plan died.

One of his biggest controversies came in late 1985, when Manes wanted to wire the borough for cable television. Manes rejected a proposal by the Queens-based Orth-O-Vision company to place cable lines in the borough, and instead awarded contracts to mega-companies Warner Communications and Time-Life, as well as a cable firm owned by former Manhattan borough president Percy Sutton. Local residents were upset that he passed over a local firm for large national companies.

== Downfall and suicide ==
Shortly after his inauguration for a fifth term, Manes attended a dinner party for the new Israel consul at Borough Hall in Kew Gardens on January 9, 1986. He left in his own car and was followed by his chauffeur up Queens Boulevard. He was later found in his car in the early morning hours of January 10; his wrists were slit and he was bleeding profusely. He initially claimed that two men had carjacked and attacked him, but later recanted the statement, saying he had attempted suicide.

In the following weeks, it was alleged that Manes had used political appointments and favors as the source of large kickback schemes involving personal bureaucratic fiefdoms, most notably the New York City Parking Violations Bureau. In 1978, Manes installed a friend, Geoffrey Lindenauer, who later cooperated with prosecutors, as the deputy head of the Parking Violations Bureau. With Manes’ help, Lindenauer steered collections of parking fines to a company that paid the two bribes of up to $2,500 per month by 1982. Later in 1982, Manes, Lindenauer and Bronx Democratic Party leader Stanley M. Friedman each received shares in a company called Citisource, which won a city contract to develop a handheld parking ticket computer. Manes also accepted bribes from SRS, a company also involved in parking ticket collections, whose owner also cooperated with authorities. Columnist Jimmy Breslin published a story on January 23, 1986 in which the head of a third parking collections company confessed to paying $36,000 in bribes to Manes.

Zoning and cable TV franchises were being investigated, and some of Manes' appointees and associates were indicted or forced to resign. Manes' deputy Claire Shulman was installed as acting Borough President on January 28 and he formally resigned on February 11.

The scandal became nationwide news and a continuing top story in New York City. Manes, now facing the prospect of indictment on corruption charges, stayed in seclusion until March. On the night of March 13, he took a phone call from his psychiatrist, who discussed additional care with Manes (and his wife on an extension phone upstairs). Shortly before 10 p.m. the psychiatrist was called away from the phone and, while on hold, Manes reached into a kitchen drawer, pulled out a large kitchen knife and plunged the eight-inch blade into his heart. His daughter screamed for her mother, who came down to find Manes on the floor in a pool of blood. Marlene Manes pulled the knife from his heart as their daughter frantically called 911. Donald Manes was pronounced dead at the scene.

Less than three years later, on November 17, 1988, Morton Manes, Donald Manes' twin brother, attempted suicide in the same manner. He died of a heart attack at the age of 70 in May 2004.

Manes was buried at Mt. Ararat Cemetery in Farmingdale, New York. Manes' successor, Claire Shulman, served as Borough President until 2002.

== Popular culture ==
- A loosely fictionalized version of the scandal served as the basis for the film City Hall (1996).
- The original pilot episode of the television series Law & Order, "Everybody's Favorite Bagman", was based on the scandal.
- Manes' suicide and dealings with attorney Michael Dowd are both referenced on a news broadcast in the opening of the 2023 film Bones and All.

New York City Council
Preceded by Julius Moskowitz	New York City Council; 15th district 1966–1971	Succeeded by Morton Povman
Political offices
Preceded by Sidney Leviss	Borough President of Queens; 1971–1986	Succeeded by Claire Shulman
