= Jr. Food Stores =

American convenience store chain

- Type: Subsidiary
- Industry: Energy, Retail (Convenience stores)
- Founded: January 1969; 57 years ago
- Founder: The Reeves Family
- Headquarters: Bowling Green, Kentucky, United States
- Services: Fuel; Convenience store
- Parent: Houchens Industries

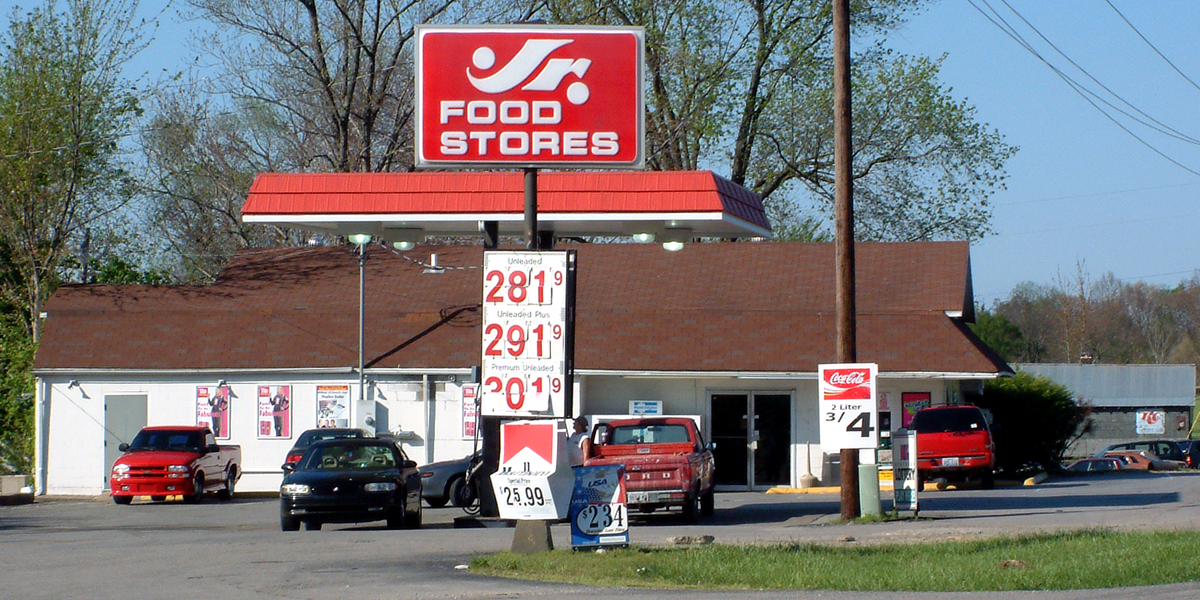
A Jr. Food Stores location near Sweeden, Kentucky

Jr. Food Stores is a chain of convenience stores operating in south central Kentucky and northern Middle Tennessee, with approximately 41 retail locations. It is owned by Houchens Industries.

The chain is not related to Jr. Food Mart (founded 1960), which is an outgrowth of the now-defunct Jitney Jungle supermarket chain and continues to operate convenience stores in Alabama, Mississippi, and Louisiana, or the now-defunct Jr. Food Stores chain based in Panama City, Florida (founded 1961), which had locations in five Gulf Coast states and was sold in 1995.

== History ==
Jr. Food Stores was founded in 1969 by Lester D. Reeves and the Reeves family of Bowling Green, Kentucky, who operated up to 9 larger supermarkets called Reeves Food Centers in and around their hometown. On June 2, 1984, after 30 years operation, the supermarkets were sold. Six were purchased by Reeves Food Centers, Inc. employees, Steve Riley, who was a vice president with the company, and David Huffman, a supervisor. The other 3 stores, located in Cave City, Greensburg and Munfordville, Kentucky, were sold to out-of-town investors.

The first Jr. Food Store opened in January 1969 in the 1400 block of Adams Street in Bowling Green, KY. Lester Reeves founded the company and eventually 2 of his sons worked directly in the business. The oldest son, Alan Reeves, joined the company in 1973, was appointed to director of marketing in 1976 and was promoted to vice president, director of operations in August 1981. Alan Reeves was appointed to the position of president in July 1988, a position he held until the company was sold. The youngest son of Lester Reeves, Robin Reeves, also joined the company in 1982, and after serving as director of gasoline marketing, was appointed to director of marketing in October 1992, and then vice president of marketing in February 1994.

The chain grew both by opening new stores and through strategic acquisitions of existing stores. In the early 1970s, Jr. Food Stores purchased Witty's Super Sak in Edmonton, Kentucky. In April 1982, Jr. Food Stores acquired 3 Tucker's Minit Marts located in Bowling Green, KY, bringing the total operations to 39 stores. Six locations were purchased in October 1983 in Radcliff and Elizabethtown, Kentucky from Blue Bird Food Marts. In March 1986, Jr. Food Stores purchased Dixon's 21st Street Market, which was owned by Seldon and Ann Dixon, adding to the 45 other stores owned at that time.

In May 1998, the Reeves family sold the convenience stores to their former cross-town competitor Houchens Industries, who operate smaller supermarkets in towns and cities surrounding Bowling Green.
