= America the Beautiful silver bullion coins =

Silver bullion coins of the United States

- United States
- Value: 0.25 US dollar
- Mass: 155.5 g (5.00 troy oz)
- Diameter: 76.2 mm (3 in)
- Thickness: 3.25 mm (0.128 in)
- Edge: Plain with incuse inscriptions
- Composition: 99.9% Ag
- Years of minting: 2010–2021

Obverse
- Design: George Washington
- Designer: John Flanagan (1932 version) from a 1786 bust by Houdon / William Cousins (modification to Flanagan's design)
- Design date: 2010

Reverse
- Design: Various; Five designs per year (one in 2021)
- Designer: Various

The America the Beautiful silver bullion coins comprise a series of silver bullion coins with a face value of a quarter dollar. The coins contain five troy ounces of silver, making them the largest silver bullion coins ever issued by the United States Mint. The design of the coins duplicates exactly—though enlarged—each of the America the Beautiful quarters. They were issued from 2010 to 2021. The coins were available for sale during the year in which their corresponding circulating coin is issued. The coins are distributed by the United States Mint's network of authorized bullion dealers, and may be resold at the discretion of the Director of the National Park Service.

== Design ==
A normal-sized quarter (left) sitting next to a bullion coin in a plastic holder (right)

All coins in the series feature a common obverse depicting George Washington in a restored version of the portrait created by John Flanagan for the 1932 Washington quarter, while the reverse feature five individual designs for each year of the program (one in 2021), each depicting a national park or national site (one from each state, federal district, and territory). Unlike the reeded edge of the normal quarter, the silver coins have a smooth edge inscribed with the coin specifications: .999 FINE SILVER 5.0 OUNCE.

=== Differences between uncirculated and bullion versions ===
There are three main differences between the uncirculated and bullion versions of the coin:

- Each uncirculated coin comes with a certificate of authenticity from the Mint and is placed inside a plastic capsule and then in a presentation box; the bullion version is shipped in tubes of 10 coins. The tubes are shipped by the mint in "monster boxes", ten tubes to a box, and the contents are sold at the retailer's discretion.
- The uncirculated coins are vapor blasted ("burnished") after minting, giving them a matte finish, while bullion coins have a shinier finish.
- Under the "In God We Trust" inscription, the uncirculated coins feature a "P" mint mark representing the Philadelphia mint, whereas the bullion coins do not have a mint mark.

== Legislative history ==
The program is authorized by Title II of the America’s Beautiful National Parks Quarter Dollar Coin Act of 2008.

== Minting history ==
A new coining press from Germany, the Grabener 1000 press, was installed on March 1, 2010, at the Philadelphia Mint for use in producing the America the Beautiful Silver Bullion Coins. The press provides up to 1,000 metric tons (1,100 short tons) of pressure for each strike and can produce in excess of 1 million coins per year. Silver planchets for the series will be supplied by Sunshine Minting.

In conjunction with the April 27, 2010, meeting of the Citizens Coinage Advisory Committee in Philadelphia, committee members were shown examples of the America the Beautiful silver bullion coins.

== Coins released to date ==
Year	No.	State/territory	Site	US Mint item#	Release date	Bullion mintage	Uncirculated mintage
2010	1	Arkansas	Hot Springs National Park	NP1	4/19/2010	33,000 ea.	27,000 ea.
2010	2	Wyoming	Yellowstone National Park	NP2	6/1/2010	33,000 ea.	27,000 ea.
2010	3	California	Yosemite National Park	NP3	7/26/2010	33,000 ea.	27,000 ea.
2010	4	Arizona	Grand Canyon National Park	NP4	9/20/2010	33,000 ea.	26,019
2010	5	Oregon	Mount Hood National Forest	NP5	11/15/2010	33,000 ea.	26,928
2011	6	Pennsylvania	Gettysburg National Military Park	NP6	1/24/2011	126,700 ea.	24,625
2011	7	Montana	Glacier National Park	NP7	4/4/2011	126,700 ea.	20,856
2011	8	Washington	Olympic National Park	NP8	6/13/2011	104,900	18,398
2011	9	Mississippi	Vicksburg National Military Park	NP9	8/29/2011	58,100	18,594
2011	10	Oklahoma	Chickasaw National Recreation Area	NP10	11/14/2011	48,700	16,827
2012	11	Puerto Rico	El Yunque National Forest	NQ0	1/23/2012	24,000	17,314
2012	12	New Mexico	Chaco Culture National Historical Park	NQ1	4/2/2012	24,400	17,146
2012	13	Maine	Acadia National Park	NQ2	6/11/2012	25,400	14,978
2012	14	Hawai'i	Hawai'i Volcanoes National Park	NQ3	8/27/2012	20,000 ea.	14,863
2012	15	Alaska	Denali National Park	NQ4	11/5/2012	20,000 ea.	15,225
2013	16	New Hampshire	White Mountain National Forest	NQ5	1/28/2013	35,000	20,530
2013	17	Ohio	Perry's Victory and International Peace Memorial	NQ6	4/1/2013	30,000 ea.	17,707
2013	18	Nevada	Great Basin National Park	NQ7	6/10/2013	30,000 ea.	17,792
2013	19	Maryland	Fort McHenry National Monument and Historic Shrine	NQ8	8/27/2013	30,000 ea.	19,802
2013	20	South Dakota	Mount Rushmore National Memorial	NQ9	11/4/2013	35,000	23,547
2014	21	Tennessee	Great Smoky Mountains National Park	NR1	1/27/2014	33,000	24,710
2014	22	Virginia	Shenandoah National Park	NR2	3/31/2014	25,000	28,451
2014	23	Utah	Arches National Park	NR3	6/9/2014	22,000 ea.	28,434
2014	24	Colorado	Great Sand Dunes National Park	NR4	8/25/2014	22,000 ea.	24,103
2014	25	Florida	Everglades National Park	NR5	11/3/2014	34,000	22,732
2015	26	Nebraska	Homestead National Monument of America	SN1	2/9/2015	35,000	21,286
2015	27	Louisiana	Kisatchie National Forest	SN2	4/13/2015	42,000	19,449
2015	28	North Carolina	Blue Ridge Parkway	SN3	6/22/2015	45,000 ea.	17,461
2015	29	Delaware	Bombay Hook National Wildlife Refuge	SN4	9/14/2015	45,000 ea.	17,309
2015	30	New York	Saratoga National Historical Park	SN5	11/16/2015	45,000 ea.	17,563
2016	31	Illinois	Shawnee National Forest	16AJ	2/1/2016	105,000	18,781
2016	32	Kentucky	Cumberland Gap National Historical Park	16AK	4/4/2016	75,000	18,713
2016	33	West Virginia	Harpers Ferry National Historical Park	16AL	6/6/2016	55,300	18,896
2016	34	North Dakota	Theodore Roosevelt National Park	16AM	8/29/2016	40,000	18,917
2016	35	South Carolina	Fort Moultrie (Fort Sumter National Monument)	16AN	11/14/2016	35,000 ea.	17,882
2017	36	Iowa	Effigy Mounds National Monument	17AJ	2/6/2017	35,000 ea.	17,251
2017	37	District of Columbia	Frederick Douglass National Historic Site	17AK	4/3/2017	20,000 ea.	17,678
2017	38	Missouri	Ozark National Scenic Riverways	17AL	6/5/2017	20,000 ea.	17,694
2017	39	New Jersey	Ellis Island (Statue of Liberty National Monument)	17AM	8/28/2017	40,000	17,670
2017	40	Indiana	George Rogers Clark National Historical Park	17AN	11/13/2017	35,000	14,731
2018	41	Michigan	Pictured Rocks National Lakeshore	18AJ	02/19/2018	30,000 ea.	17,773
2018	42	Wisconsin	Apostle Islands National Lakeshore	18AK	04/13/2018	30,000 ea.	16,802
2018	43	Minnesota	Voyageurs National Park	18AL	06/14/2018	30,000 ea.	16,839
2018	44	Georgia	Cumberland Island National Seashore	18AM	09/12/2018	52,500	16,376
2018	45	Rhode Island	Block Island National Wildlife Refuge	18AN	11/26/2018	80,000 ea.	15,912
2019	46	Massachusetts	Lowell National Historical Park	19AJ	02/07/2019	80,000 ea.	16,644
2019	47	Northern Mariana Islands	American Memorial Park	19AK	04/04/2019	80,000 ea.	16,287
2019	48	Guam	War in the Pacific National Historical Park	19AL	06/06/2019	72,500	16,277
2019	49	Texas	San Antonio Missions National Historical Park	19AM	08/29/2019	55,200	16,211
2019	50	Idaho	Frank Church River of No Return Wilderness	19AN	11/14/2019	25,000	16,310
2020	51	American Samoa	National Park of American Samoa	20AJ	02/06/2020	45,000 ea.	15,781
2020	52	Connecticut	Weir Farm National Historic Site	20AK	05/18/2020	45,000 ea.	15,399
2020	53	U.S. Virgin Islands	Salt River Bay National Historical Park and Ecological Preserve	20AL	09/18/2020	45,000 ea.	13,566
2020	54	Vermont	Marsh-Billings-Rockefeller National Historical Park	20AM	11/23/2020	45,000 ea.	13,601
2020	55	Kansas	Tallgrass Prairie National Preserve	20AN	12/7/2020	45,000 ea.	13,617
2021	56	Alabama	Tuskegee Airman National Historic Site	21AJ	4/8/2021	52,900	19,819

== See also ==
- America the Beautiful quarters
- America the Beautiful quarter mintage figures
- American Silver Eagle
- Bullion
- Bullion coin
- Inflation hedge
- Silver as an investment
