= Delchamps =

Defunct supermarket chain

- Company type: Public
- Traded as: Nasdaq: DLCH
- Industry: Supermarket
- Founded: 1921; 105 years ago
- Founder: Alfred Frederick Delchamps
- Defunct: 2001; 25 years ago
- Fate: Acquired by Jitney Jungle
- Successor: Jitney Jungle
- Headquarters: Mobile, Alabama, U.S.
- Number of locations: 118 (at time of acquisition)
- Area served: Alabama, Louisiana, Mississippi, Florida

Delchamps was a chain of supermarkets along the central Gulf Coast of the United States, headquartered in Mobile, Alabama. At the time of its acquisition in 1997, the company had 118 supermarkets in Alabama, Louisiana, Mississippi, and Florida and its stock was public traded on NASDAQ under DLCH.

== History ==
The chain was founded by Alfred Frederick Delchamps in November 1921 at the corner of Lawrence and Canal streets in Mobile, which he operated along with his brother, Oliver.

In 1927, Delchamps opened its first warehouse at the intersection of Commerce and St. Anthony Streets in order for the company to carry higher quality merchandise and a larger variety of foods. The warehouse was moved to a larger facility at the foot of Dauphin Street four years later, and a larger, more modern warehouse was built at the intersection of Water and Adams Streets. Additional warehouse space was utilized in the Happy Hill neighborhood north of Downtown Mobile and at the Alabama State Docks.

Delchamps opened its first supermarket at the intersection of St. Louis Street and Washington Avenue in 1928. This was the largest grocery store in Mobile and, moreover, the largest food store in Alabama. Three years later, in 1931, Delchamps opened its first out of state location in Pensacola, Florida. A rival grocery chain, the Coleman Grocery Company, was acquired in 1937, making Delchamps the largest grocery chain in the city, with ten stores. In 1941, Delchamps opened its first store in Montgomery. In order to make future expansions possible, Delchamps incorporated in 1946. This incorporation allowed employees to own stock in the company as well. In 1964, Delchamps joined Topco, a national, cooperatively owned purchasing association that wielded as much purchasing power as the largest supermarket chains. The move made it possible for Delchamps to purchase grade-A foodstuffs and related merchandise at competitive prices.

On the occasion of Delchamps' 50th anniversary in November 1971, brand strategy firm Lippincot & Marguiles designed a new logotype and corporate identity program for the chain. A "warm" and "friendly" typeface influenced by the Bauhaus GeoSet font was selected after corporate executives previewed a handful of candidate designs. Store Number Six, located at the intersection of Old Shell Road and Upham Street in midtown Mobile, was the first unit to receive the updated logo and graphics package. This logo, with slight modifications, was used by Delchamps until its eventual closure in the early 2000s.

In 1985, Delchamps unveiled its 42,057-square-foot (3,907.2 m^{2}) Super Store supermarket concept. This format featured a bakery, delicatessen and salad bar in addition to conventional grocery store amenities. The Delchamps Super Stores operated on a 24-hour basis. The first Delchamps Super Store opened at the North Gate Shopping Center, now known as Dauphin Square, on Dauphin Street in west Mobile. Over the next decade, Delchamps Super Store supermarkets were constructed, replacing outmoded Delchamps grocery stores in markets along the Gulf Coast.

In 1997, the chain was purchased by Jackson, Mississippi-based Jitney Jungle, itself a well-known brand name in its home state and neighboring Louisiana, for $213.6 million (~$387 million in 2024) in cash. At the time of the acquisition, Delchamps had 118 supermarkets and 10 liquor stores in Louisiana, Mississippi, Alabama and Florida. A total of 114 Delchamps stores were purchased, with a handful being closed and another small group being re-branded as Jitney Jungle. However, the purchase and Jitney's takeover by an investment firm proved to be ill-advised, and by 1999 the combined chains went into bankruptcy. The next year some stores were sold off to competitor Winn-Dixie; most of those locations have since closed in the wake of that chain's own troubles and retrenchment toward its northern Florida base. Nineteen other locations were sold to Bruno's Supermarkets and converted to their brands. At least one location in Hoover, Alabama reopened as a Publix Super Markets. This was after the location sat vacant for several years. Among the last known to close was the Delchamps in Milton, Florida, whose liquidation lasted into January 2001.
