= Jitney Jungle =

Chain of supermarkets

- Final logo, used from 1977
- Predecessor: Delchamps
- Founded: 1919; 107 years ago
- Defunct: 2001; 25 years ago
- Fate: Acquired by Winn-Dixie; nameplate eliminated
- Headquarters: Jackson, Mississippi, U.S.

Jitney Jungle was a chain of supermarkets that began in Jackson, Mississippi, in 1919. It was a private Forbes 500 company and one of the largest privately held grocery store chains in the United States. It was acquired by Winn-Dixie in 2000.

== Origins ==
Originally, brothers Judson McCarty Holman and William Henry Holman and their cousin William Bonner McCarty founded a grocery store in Jackson, Mississippi, in 1912. Over the next few years, they opened additional stores, but in 1916, one of their stores found itself unable to collect the amounts owed by some of its customers, and the idea of changing over to a cash-and-carry business model began to take root. While W. H. Holman was away serving in World War I, his brother and cousin decided to change over to cash-and-carry, and after he returned from the war, they opened the first Jitney Jungle on East Capitol Street in Jackson on 19 April 1919.

The three patented the Jitney Jungle concept in 1920, but were soon hit with a patent infringement lawsuit brought by Piggly Wiggly. To disprove the infringement allegations, Will McCarty made a trip west and found cash-and-carry stores there, which contradicted Piggly Wiggly's assertion that it had originated the idea. The Supreme Court found in Jitney Jungle's favor.

The chain gradually expanded across Mississippi and into neighboring states, eventually ending up with stores as far away as Florida. In 1973, the chain had 38 grocery stores, six gasoline stations, and five drugstores, and by 1992, Jitney Jungle had over 100 stores.

In 1960, the company entered the convenience store industry with the creation of Jitney Jr., later to be known as Jr. Food Mart. All Jr. Food Mart stores offered gasoline and groceries, with many featuring fast service restaurants, notably Creole Fried Chicken. Jr. Food Mart operates convenience stores in Alabama, Mississippi and Louisiana. In 1965, Jitney would join Topco, a national, cooperatively-owned purchasing association that wielded as much purchasing power as the largest supermarket chains. The move made it possible for Jitney to purchase grade-A foodstuffs and related merchandise at competitive prices.

In 1985, parent company Jitney Jungle Inc. spun off Jitney-Jungle Stores of America, its grocery operating division, to focus on operating its Jr. Food Mart subsidiary. JJSA would be given full rights to the Jitney Jungle name, with JJI changing its name to JFM Incorporated on October 1, 1986. JFM would move its headquarters from Jackson to Flowood, Mississippi in 2003, and continues to operate.

== Decline and bankruptcy ==
In the mid-1990s, Jitney Jungle Stores of America would be sold to the New York-based investment firm Bruckmann, Rosser, Sherrill & Co. for $400 million. By the end of 90’s, the chain had become debt-ridden from mismanagement, and its ill-advised 1997 acquisition of Delchamps. In 2000, Winn-Dixie acquired Jitney Jungle and Delchamps. The company would close or convert all Delchamps locations by the end of January 2001, but only began to convert Jitney Jungle stores to their own nameplate beginning September 5.

In 2005, Winn-Dixie closed many stores, including most of its stores in Mississippi that had previously been Jitney Jungle stores. Some of these stores remain closed, with no particular prospects of being acquired and reopened. Others have taken on new lives.

== Name ==
There has been much local speculation about where the odd-sounding name "Jitney Jungle" came from. One legend has it that when the first store placed its first advertisement in a local newspaper, the store called itself the "Jitney Jingle" -- "jitney" was a slang word for a nickel, and the idea was that when you came out of the store, the nickels would still be jingling in your pocket because you'd saved so much money. But the newspaper, the story goes, fumbled the name of the store into "Jitney Jungle," and it stuck. However, this explanation was rejected by W. H. Holman, Jr., a member of the family who started Jitney Jungle. In his 1973 address to the Mississippi Committee of the Newcomen Society of the United States in Jackson, Holman said:

How did they get the name, Jitney-Jungle? The naming process began during a Sunday dinner at the home of Judge V. J. Stricker, a close friend of the families. The "Jitney" in the title was a popular name for the cut-rate five-cent taxis of that day, many of which were operated by returning veterans. It would be jitneys that would carry many of the cash customers to the store and back. Jitney was also a slang term for a nickel. That fitted in with the "nickel on a quarter" that the customer would save by patronizing the self-service store. Also, a popular expression of that time had to do with "jingling your jitneys in your pockets." Thus, Judge Stricker ventured the name Jitney-Jingle. There is a legend that "Jingle" got to be "Jungle" by virtue of a printer's error in the first advertisement. Rather it was a play on words by Mr. Will McCarty. Every Jitney would be a jungle of bargains that could save the customer a "jitney" on a quarter.

Jitney Fresh Markets, a grocery chain in Southern California is not related to the former Jitney Jungle Stores of America.

== Other sources ==
- History of Jitney Jungle from before the company's demise
