= Jr. Food Mart =

American convenience store chain

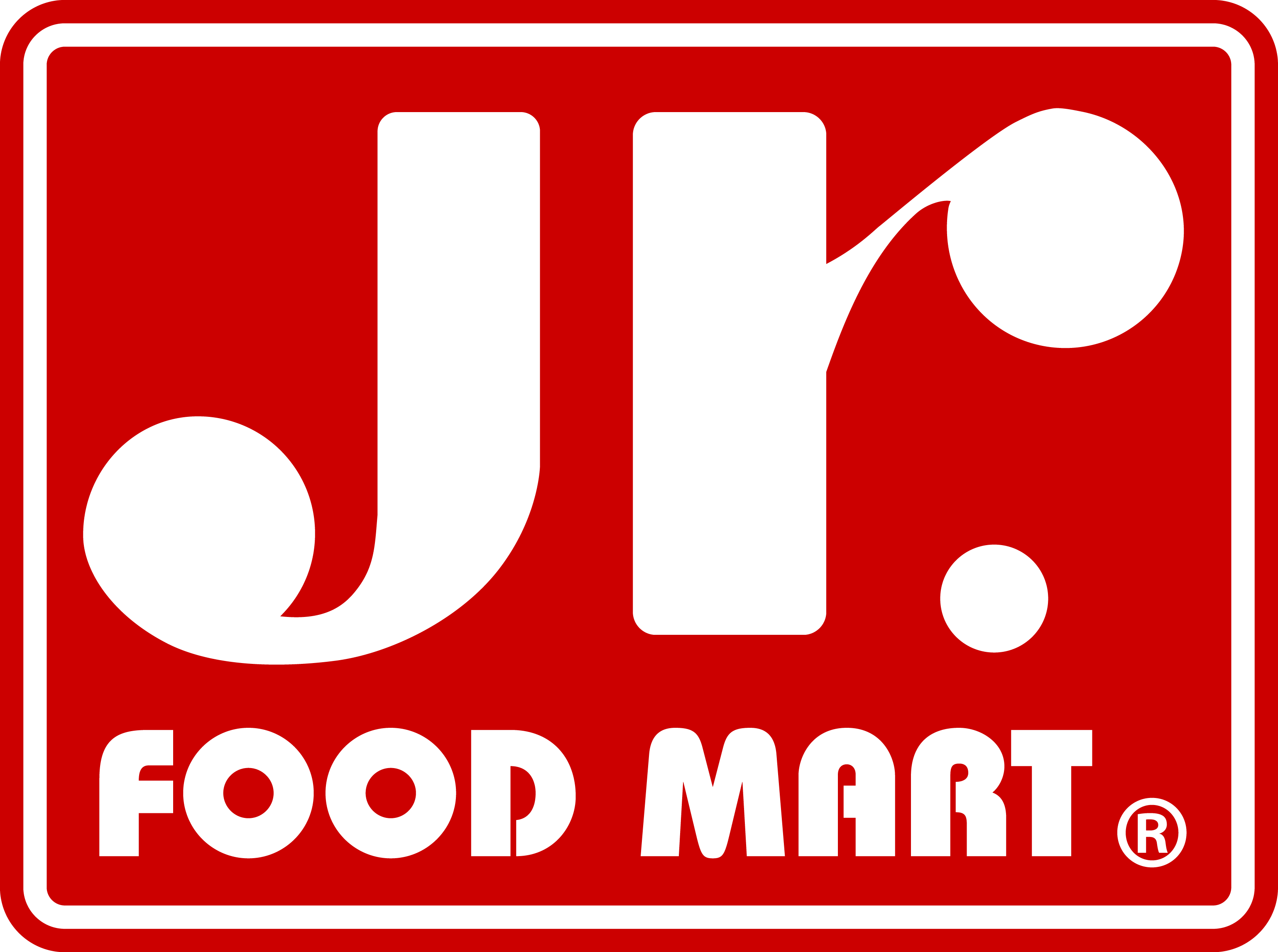
- Type: Private
- Industry: Retail
- Founded: November 17, 1960; 65 years ago
- Headquarters: Flowood, Mississippi, United States
- Number of locations: 14
- Website: jrfoodmart.com

Jr. Food Mart is an American chain of convenience stores found throughout the southern United States, operating throughout Alabama, Mississippi and Louisiana. At one time, the chain included franchise locations spanning from Texas to Florida, and as far north as Ohio.

== History ==
Jr. Food Mart was founded as Jitney Jr., a convenience store subsidiary of Mississippi-based supermarket chain Jitney Jungle. Its first location opened on November 17, 1960 in Tallahassee, Florida. The chain would assume its current name in July 1968.

In the late 1970s and early 1980s, most of their locations were in small towns at or near the primary intersections of the communities (commonly referred to as "Main and Main"). At that time, the company was led by Howard Blair, its president, and Russell Stutzman, executive vice president. Other notable members of the management team were Lee Crook, director of convenience store operations, and Shane Mitchell, director of food service operations. The company experienced rapid growth during this period, due to Blair's talent in locating and securing exceptional properties and favorable lease terms for its franchisees. This, combined with modernized store designs and one of the most successful fast-food concepts of its time, made Jr. Food Mart one of the innovators of the convenience store industry during that time period.

All Jr. Food Mart stores sell gasoline and groceries. Many of them have fast service restaurants featuring, among others, Creole Fried Chicken, developed by former franchisee Sonny Adams. The Creole Fried Chicken concept was developed by Brian T. Reynolds and Shane Mitchell, whose experience in this concept came from that company.

In 1985, parent company Jitney Jungle Inc. spun off Jitney-Jungle Stores of America, its grocery operating division, to focus on the convenience store industry. JJSA would be given full rights to the Jitney Jungle name, with JJI changing its name to JFM Incorporated on October 1, 1986. JFM would move its headquarters from Jackson to Flowood, Mississippi in 2003.

This chain is not related to the Kentucky-based Jr. Food Stores chain operating in south central Kentucky and northern middle Tennessee, or the former Florida-based Jr. Food Stores chain which operated across the southeast which had early ties to the Jitney Jungle chain.
