= William Bonner McCarty =

William Bonner McCarty, Sr. of Jackson, Mississippi was a founder of the now defunct Jitney Jungle (also known as the Jitney-Jungle Stores of America).

== About Will ==
¹"It was (Will) who conceived the idea, and helped coin the name of Jitney Jungle, and who then made plans to install Jitney Jungle stores all over the country." Will along with his two cousins Judson and Henry Holman opened the first Jitney Jungle on April 19, 1919. His son William Bonner McCarty, Jr. served as Chairman of the Board and CEO of Jitney Jungle, Incorporated.

== How It Began ==
¹"Will's father, William Henry McCarty, was a groceryman, who operated a plantation store at Rising Sun, on the banks of the Yazoo River." He later opened a store in Jackson, Mississippi known as Jackson Mercantile Co. The original store on McTyere Street in Jackson was a converted barn. William Henry McCarty died in 1910 and two cousins of his, Judson McCarty Holman and William Henry Holman purchased the grocery from the estate. Will soon joined the partnership in 1912 after finishing law school at the University of Mississippi.

== Jitney Jungle ==
Jitney Jungle was a chain of supermarkets that got its start in Jackson, Mississippi, in 1919. By 1992, Jitney Jungle had over 200 stores under several names. By the mid-1990s, the New York investment firm Bruckmann, Rosser, Sherrill & Co., acquired the chain. The chain quickly became debt-ridden, and its ill-advised 1997 acquisition of Delchamps didn't help the situation. In 2000, Winn-Dixie acquired Jitney Jungle and Delchamps, and rebranded the stores to Winn-Dixie.

== Lawsuit by Piggly Wiggly ==
Clarence Saunders filed a lawsuit against Jitney Jungle over the use of "self-service" store setup. Saunders had a patent granted in 1917 for "Self-serving store" and was suing anyone using those processes. In court, William Bonner McCarty showed that the self servicing process was preexisting by pointing to a similar store in California by the name of "Alpha-Beta". McCarty won the lawsuit leading to widespread adoption of the self-servicing method.

== Footnotes ==
¹ Holman, William Henry, Jr.. Save a Nickel on a Quarter. New York: The Newcomen Society in North America, 1974. LCCN 73-89287.
