= Washington quarter =

US 25-cent coin minted since 1932

- United States
- Value: 25 cents (0.25 US dollars)
- Mass: 5.67 g
- Diameter: 24.3 mm
- Edge: reeded
- Orientation: coin (180°)
- Composition: Current—cupronickel clad to copper. Prior to 1965—6.25 grams, 90% silver, 10% copper. Silver versions for collectors since 1976 also exist
- Years of minting: 1932, 1934–present
- Mint marks: D, S, P, W. Mintmark location & history on 1932–2021 coins discussed in #Clad composition.

Obverse
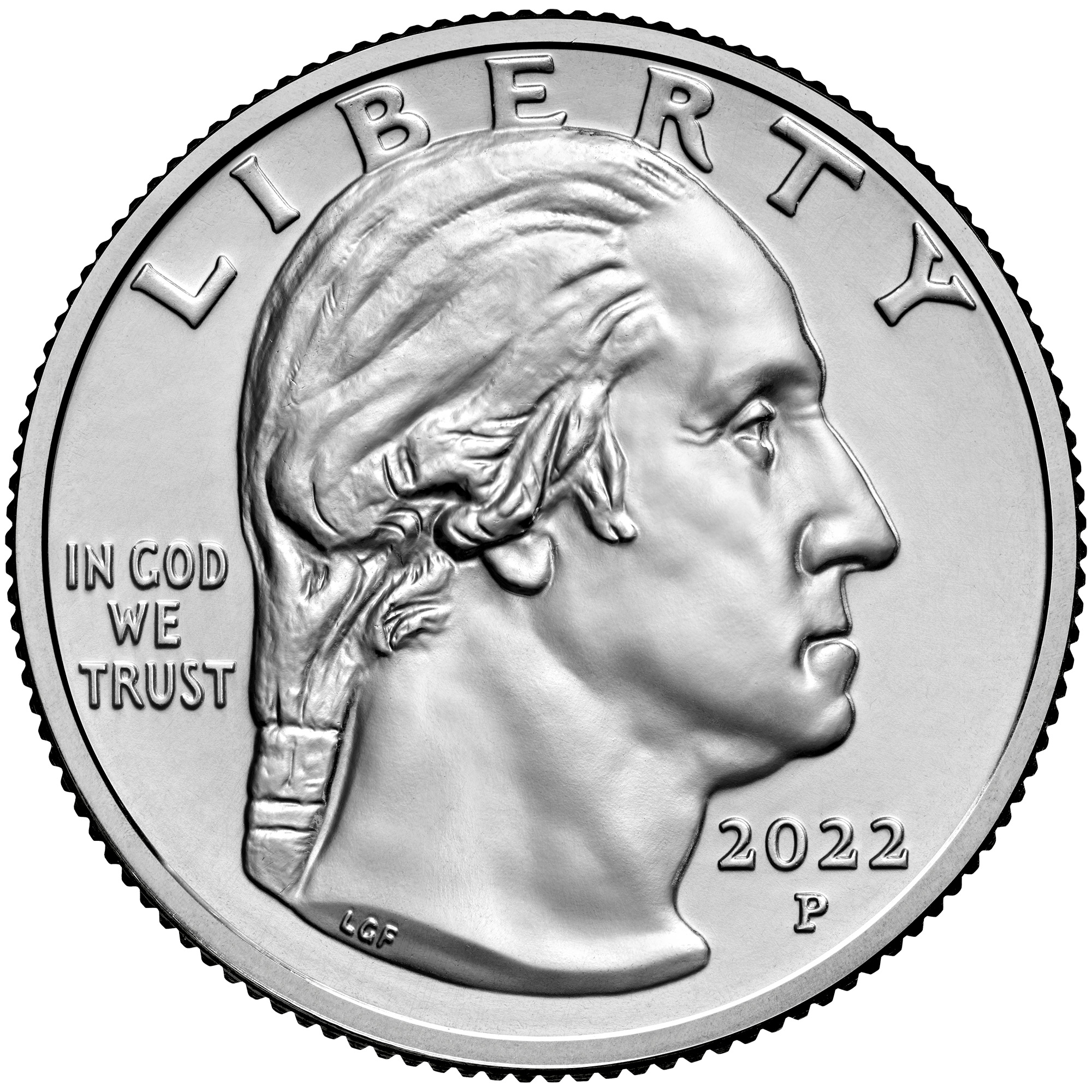
- Design: Bust of George Washington. Variants of previous obverse shown in #Silver quarter production.
- Designer: Laura Gardin Fraser
- Design date: 1931
- Design used: 2022

Reverse
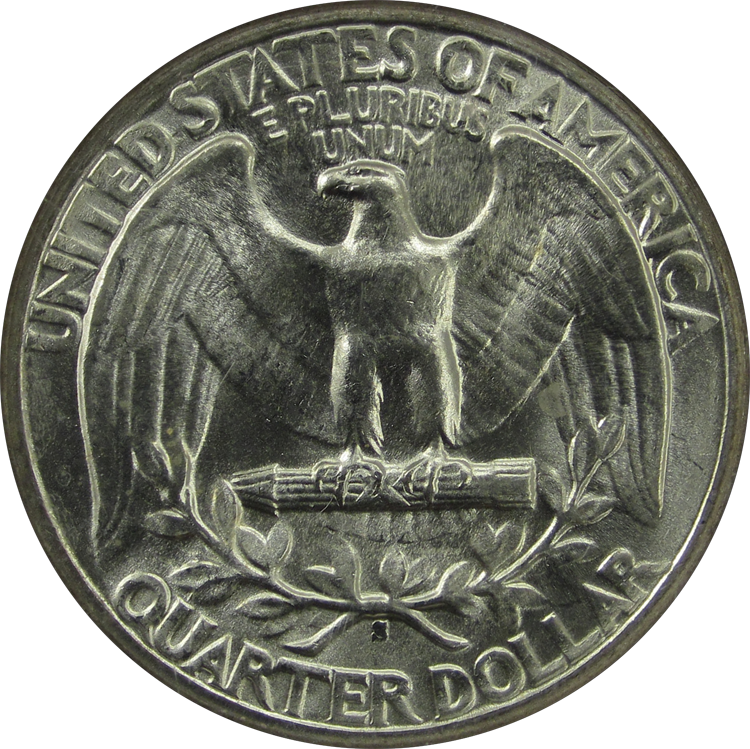
- Design: Eagle
- Designer: John Flanagan
- Design date: 1931
- Design used: 1932, 1934–1974, 1977–1998
- Design: Washington crossing the Delaware River in 1776
- Designer: Benjamin Sowards, sculpted by Michael Gaudioso
- Design date: 2020
- Design used: 2021
- Design: Various commemorative designs
- Designer: Various
- Design used: 1975–1976, 1999–2021

The Washington quarter is the present quarter dollar or 25-cent piece issued by the United States Mint. The coin was first struck in 1932; the original version was designed by sculptor John Flanagan.

As the United States prepared to celebrate the 1932 bicentennial of the birth of its first president, George Washington, members of the bicentennial committee established by Congress sought a Washington half dollar. They wanted to displace for that year only the regular issue Walking Liberty half dollar; instead Congress permanently replaced the Standing Liberty quarter, requiring that a depiction of Washington appear on the obverse of the new coin. The committee had engaged sculptor Laura Gardin Fraser to design a commemorative medal, and wanted her to adapt her design for the quarter. Although Fraser's work was supported by the Commission of Fine Arts (CFA) and its chairman, Charles W. Moore, Treasury Secretary Andrew W. Mellon chose a design by Flanagan, and Mellon's successor, Ogden L. Mills, refused to disturb the decision.

The new silver quarters entered circulation on August 1, 1932, and continued to be struck in silver until the Mint transitioned to copper-nickel clad coinage in 1965. A special reverse commemorating the United States Bicentennial was used in 1975 and 1976, with all pieces bearing the double date 1776–1976; there are no 1975-dated quarters. Since 1999, the original eagle reverse has not been used; instead that side of the quarter has commemorated the 50 states, the nation's other jurisdictions, and historic and natural sites—the last as part of the America the Beautiful Quarters series, which continued until 2021. The bust of Washington was modified and made smaller beginning in 1999; in 2010 the original bust was restored (though still small) to bring out greater detail. In 2021, Flanagan's original design resumed its place on the obverse, with a design showing Washington crossing the Delaware River in 1776 for the reverse, while in 2022 a new commemorative series depicting women commences.

== Flanagan reverse (1932–1998) ==
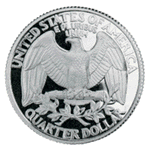
The reverse prior to the State Quarter Program

The original Washington quarter design struck until 1998 depicted a head of George Washington facing left, with "Liberty" above the head, the date below, and "In God We Trust" in the left field. The reverse depicted an eagle with wings outspread perches on a bundle of arrows framed below by two olive branches.

It initially contained 6.25 grams of 90% silver until 1964 when it switched to a base-metal composition of cupronickel (75% copper, 25% nickel) clad to a pure copper core. Non-circulating versions of the quarter containing silver have also been produced for collectors since 1976.

=== Inception ===
On December 2, 1924, Congress created the United States George Washington Bicentennial Commission. The 200th anniversary of the birth of Washington, the first president of the United States, would occur in 1932, and Congress wished to plan for the event well in advance. President Calvin Coolidge was ex officio chairman of the commission, which included government officials as well as prominent private citizens such as automobile manufacturer Henry Ford. In 1929, the Secretary of Commerce, Herbert Hoover, succeeded Coolidge both as president and in his commission role. By that time, however, the commission had become inactive, doing little after sending out an initial flurry of press releases. A new group, the George Washington Bicentennial Committee was established by Act of Congress in February 1930.

Hoover was concerned about the large numbers of designs used for commemorative coins in the 1920s; he feared that confusion would aid counterfeiters. When a commemorative coin bill was sent to him by Congress, Hoover vetoed it on April 21, 1930. In a lengthy veto message delivered to Congress with the returned bill, Hoover noted his counterfeiting concerns, and stated that the coins were selling badly anyway—large quantities of Oregon Trail Memorial half dollars remained unsold.

The Bicentennial Committee wanted a commemorative Washington half dollar, and sought to assuage Hoover's concerns by proposing that all 1932 half dollars depict Washington instead of bearing the usual Walking Liberty design. The Depression had decreased demand for coin in commerce; no half dollars had been struck in 1930, and none would be until 1933. Most commemorative coins at the time were struck in a quantity of a few thousand. The half dollar was seen as the largest and most prominent design—the Peace dollar was not then being struck and did not circulate in much of the country. Other commemoratives had been sold at a premium; the Washington half dollar would, for one year, be the normal Mint issue. Although it had not yet received congressional approval, the committee went ahead and began a competition. The committee anticipated that the same artist would first design the committee's medal and then the coin. The obverse of both medal and coin were to be based on the well-known sculpture of Washington (1786) by French sculptor Jean-Antoine Houdon; the artist was not restricted as to the reverse design. By law, coinage designs were approved by the Secretary of the Treasury, at that time Andrew W. Mellon, a noted art collector and connoisseur; it was anticipated he would interpose no objection to the plan.

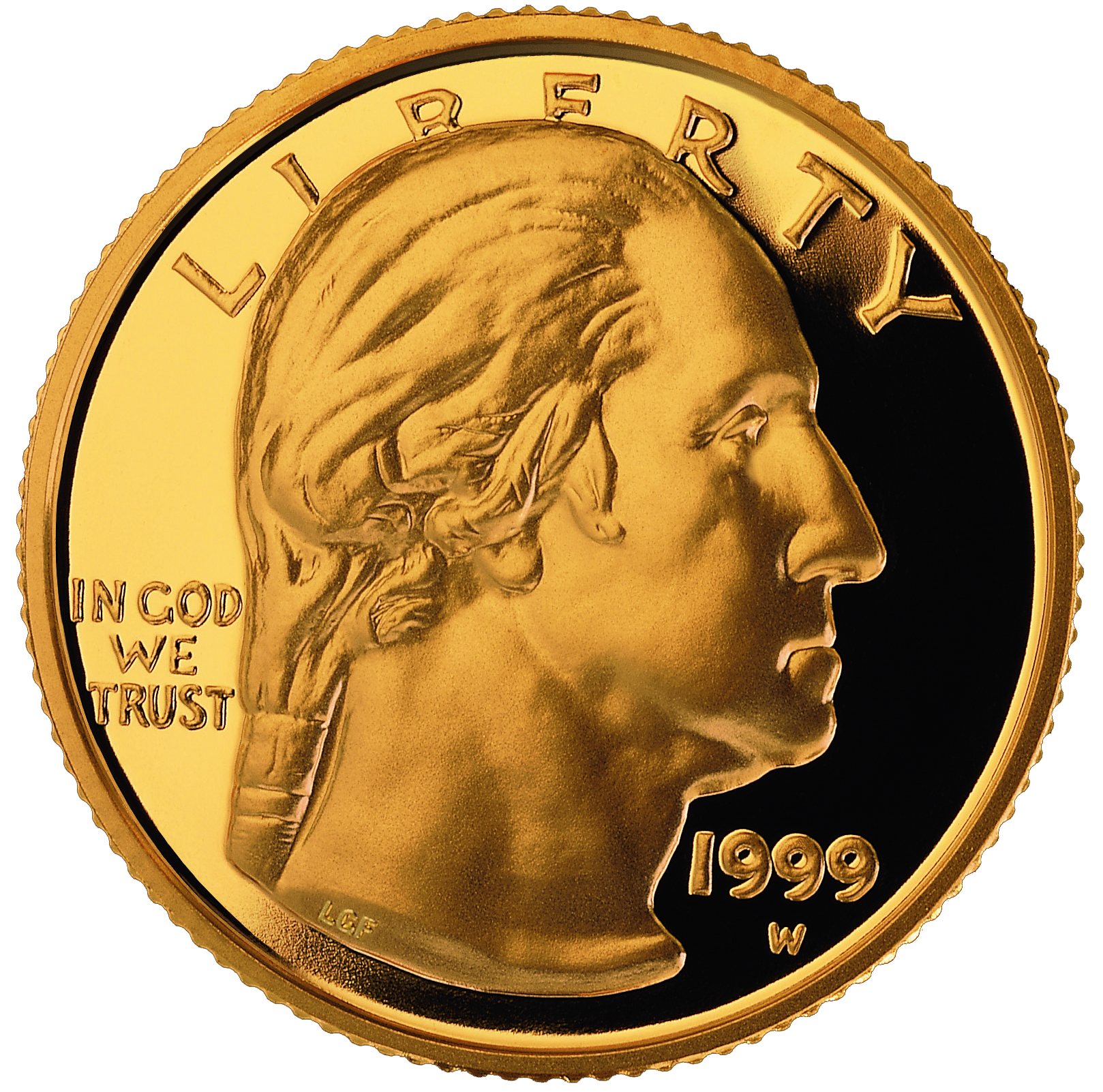
Laura Gardin Fraser's design for the quarter was used on a 1999 commemorative half eagle.

After reviewing the entries, both the Bicentennial Committee and the Commission of Fine Arts (CFA) agreed on designs by Laura Gardin Fraser. The wife of James Earle Fraser, designer of the Buffalo nickel, Laura Fraser was a notable coin designer in her own right, having designed several commemorative coins, including the Oregon Trail Memorial pieces. With a right-facing Washington, Fraser's designs were to be used for the medal, and, as those involved expected, the half dollar as well.

On February 9, 1931, New Jersey Representative Randolph Perkins introduced legislation for a Washington quarter, to the dismay of the Bicentennial Committee and Fine Arts Commission. The House of Representatives Committee on Coinage, Weights and Measures issued a memorandum stating that the design of the existing Standing Liberty quarter had been found to be unsatisfactory, and that the new piece would not only be struck for 1932, it would permanently replace the older design. Thus, a new quarter would both be a tribute to Washington on his bicentennial, and relieve the Mint of the burden of having to coin a difficult-to-strike piece. On February 12, Fine Arts Commission Chairman Charles W. Moore wrote to the House Committee, objecting to the change of denomination, and proposing that they mandate that Laura Fraser's design for the medal also appear on the coin. Moore was ignored, and Congress passed authorizing legislation for a Washington quarter on March 4, 1931. The act provided that Washington's image, to appear on the obverse, was to be based on the "celebrated bust" of the former president by Jean-Antoine Houdon; Fraser had based her design on Houdon's work.

=== Competitions ===
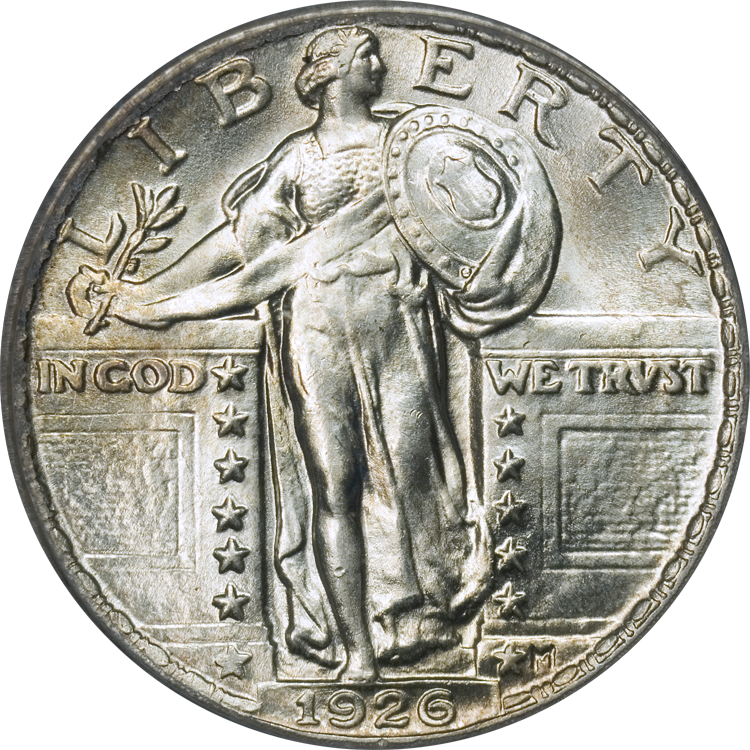
The Standing Liberty quarter had long presented production difficulties; in 1931, Congress required it to be replaced.

On July 14, 1931, Assistant Mint Director Mary Margaret O'Reilly wrote to Moore, asking the commission's advice on a design competition for the new quarter. Moore replied, stating that as Fraser had won the competition for the medal, she should adapt her design for the quarter. Secretary Mellon responded to Moore, stating that as the Treasury had been no party to the earlier design agreement, it was not bound by it, and would not follow it. The Treasury proceeded to hold a design competition, and when the Fine Arts Commission met to consider the submitted designs in an advisory role, it selected those submitted by Fraser. The designs were submitted to Mellon in November 1931; he selected Flanagan's design and notified Moore of the decision. Moore and commission member Adolph Weinman (who had designed the Mercury dime and Walking Liberty half dollar) attempted to get Mellon to change his mind, but only got him to agree to allow the various sculptors more time to improve their entries—they had asked for more time just for Fraser. On January 20, 1932, following resubmissions, the commission affirmed its support of the Fraser designs.

Mellon left office on February 12, 1932; he was succeeded by Ogden L. Mills. With a new Secretary of the Treasury in office, Moore renewed his protest, sending Mills a letter on March 31 deprecating Flanagan's design and urging the new secretary to accede to the commission's recommendation. Mills had already been briefed by O'Reilly on the quarter matter, and responded to Moore on April 11. Secretary Mills informed Moore that the chairman's letter had caused him to request changes from the sculptor, but that he would not override Mellon's decision. On April 16, the selection of Flanagan's designs was publicly announced.

Mellon was aware of which artists had submitted which designs, and has been accused of discriminating against Fraser as a woman. Numismatic historian Walter Breen stated, "it has been learned that Mellon knew all along who had submitted the winning models, and his male chauvinism partly or wholly motivated his unwillingness to let a woman win." Bowers, however, noted that Mellon had approved Fraser's designs for commemorative coins several times, as well as those by other women, and that no contemporary source speaks to any bias on Mellon's part. Bowers called the belief "modern numismatic fiction". Fraser's design was used in 1999 as a commemorative half eagle issued 200 years after Washington's death, and has been recommended as the obverse beginning in 2022.

=== Obverse design ===
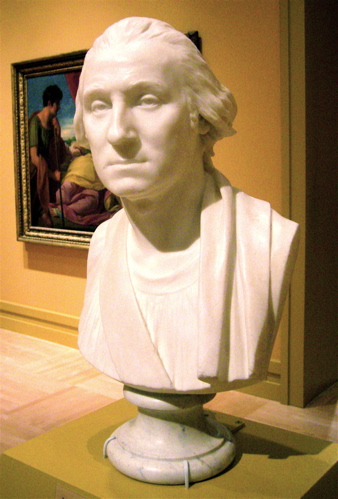
Plaster copy of bust of Washington by Houdon (1786); Houdon's work was adapted for Flanagan's profile image.

In 1785, the French sculptor Jean-Antoine Houdon was commissioned by the Virginia General Assembly to sculpt a bust of Washington, who had led the nascent United States to victory in the American Revolutionary War. Houdon had been recommended by the recently returned United States Minister to France, Benjamin Franklin. The retired general sat for Houdon at Mount Vernon, the Washington family home in Fairfax County, Virginia between October 6 and 12, 1785. The sculptor took a life mask of the general's face—Washington's adopted granddaughter Nelly Custis, aged six at the time, later recalled her shock in seeing Washington lying on a table while being covered by a sheet and the plaster for the mask, as she thought Washington was dead. She was told that two quills extended into his nostrils, providing him with air. A bust at Mount Vernon today testifies to that visit. On his return to Paris, Houdon used his visage of General Washington in a number of sculptural settings, including the commissioned statue for the General Assembly, which still stands in marble in the Virginia State Capitol.

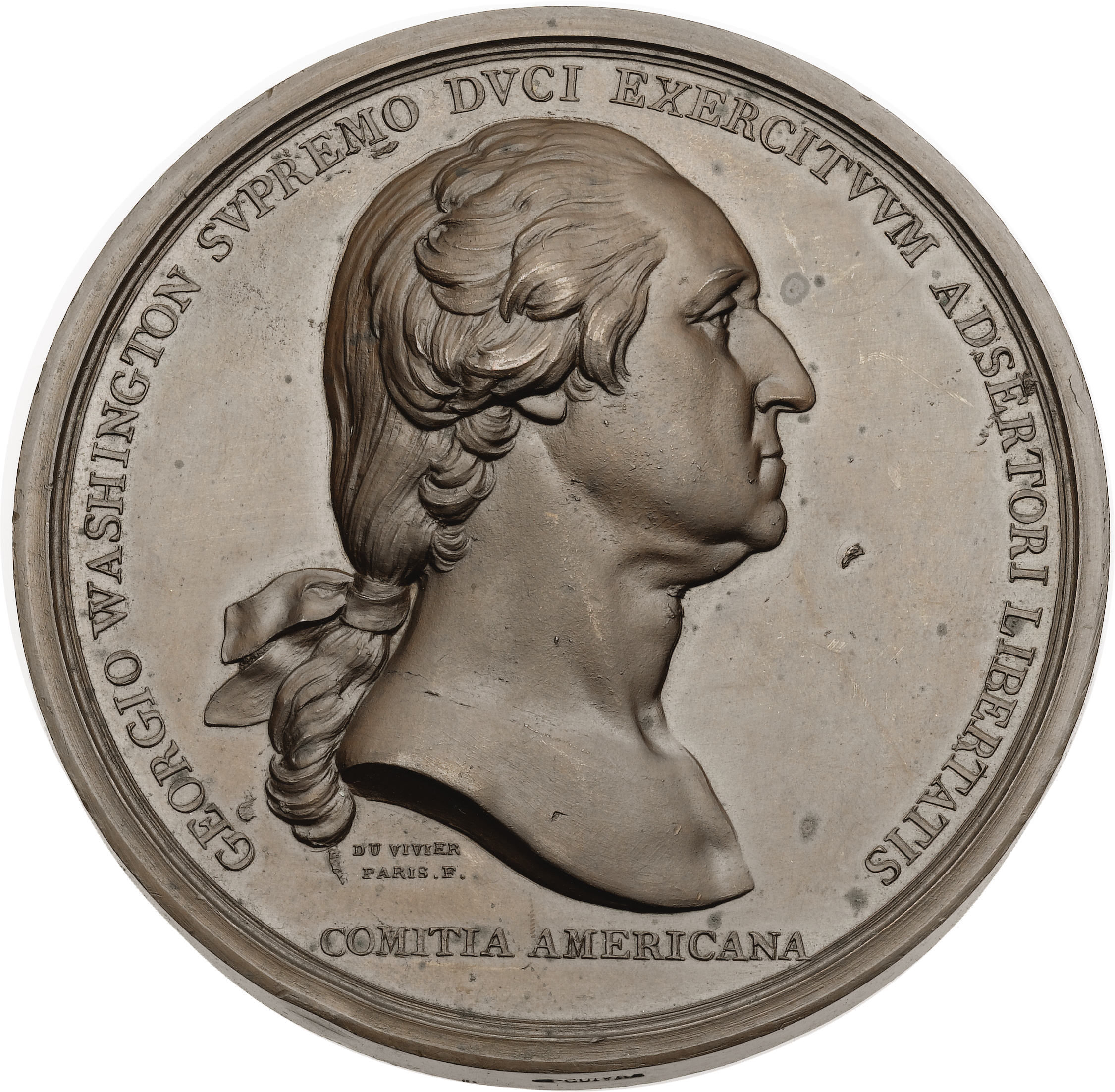
The obverse of the "Washington Before Boston" medal was the first medallic use of Houdon's bust.

Portraits of Washington on medals and in other media subsequent to the sculptor's visit were most often based on Houdon's work, beginning with the 1786 "Washington Before Boston" medal engraved by Pierre Simon DuViviers. Although only one American, Abraham Lincoln, had appeared on a circulating US coin by the 1920s, the Houdon bust had been used as the basis of the portrait of Washington on the commemorative Lafayette dollar dated 1900 and on the Sesquicentennial half dollar of 1926. According to coin dealer and numismatic historian Q. David Bowers, the Houdon bust, even then, was the most common representation of Washington on coins and medals. Little is known of Flanagan's creative process, although models of Flanagan's quarter with a different portrayal of Washington, facing right, and with a different eagle, have come on the market. Flanagan's adaptation differs from the Houdon bust in some particulars: for example, the shape of the head is different, and there is a roll of hair on the quarter not found on the bust.

Art historian Cornelius Vermeule said of Flanagan's quarter, "a die designer could do little wrong in having Houdon's Neoclassic image as his prototype ... Still, it might be asked whether or not it was fair to force an ideal[ized] portrait of Washington made in 1785 on an artist working in 1932. There is something cold and lifeless about the results." Vermeule suggests that the quarter started a trend of similar portrait coins issued by the United States, notably the Jefferson nickel and Franklin half dollar. The historian preferred Laura Fraser's version, and termed Flanagan's reverse "a stiff bit of heraldry amid too large a wreath and too much or too large lettering".

=== Silver quarter production ===
In early July 1932, newspapers announced that the Washington quarter was being struck and would be issued at the end of the month, once there were sufficient pieces for a nationwide distribution. They stressed that the new quarter was not a commemorative.

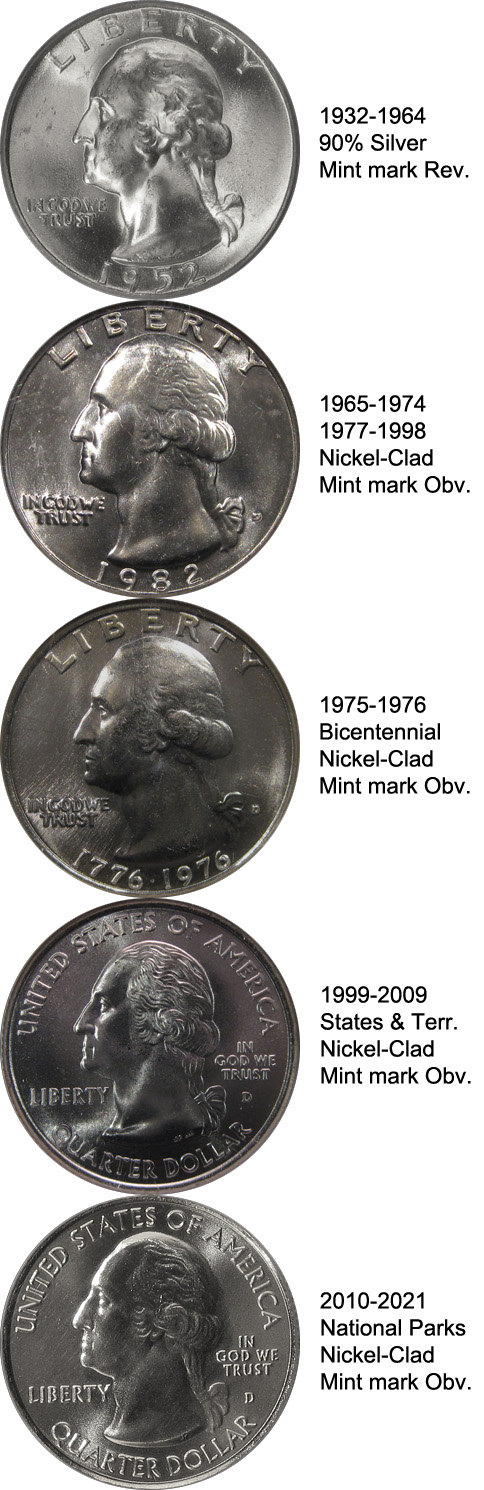
The five Washington quarter obverses: as a silver version, a clad version, the Bicentennial version, the version struck from 1999 to 2009, and the 2010 version struck until 2021.

The quarter was released into circulation on August 1, 1932. There was no great need for the coins in commerce; despite that, it was announced that six million pieces would be struck in honor of the Washington bicentennial. The coins were generally well received, though the reverse prompted discussion as to whether a bald eagle was depicted, or some other sort of eagle. An eagle expert consulted by The New York Times concluded it was a bald eagle.

About 6.2 million quarters were struck in 1932, of which 5.4 million were coined at the Philadelphia mint. Production runs of just over 400,000 each occurred at the Denver and San Francisco mints; these are still the low mintages of the series. The small mintage of the 1932 Denver piece meant that few were available to be hoarded by coin dealers, leading to present-day scarcity in mint state or uncirculated condition; the mint marks on the 1932-D and 1932-S have been counterfeited. No quarters were struck at any mint in 1933, as there was an oversupply caused by the 1932 issue.

Unlike many earlier coins, the Washington quarter struck exceptionally well, bringing out its full details. This sharpness is possible because the designs of both sides were spread out, with no points of high relief. Nevertheless, the Mint repeatedly adjusted the design. In the first three years of striking (1932, 1934 and 1935), three different varieties of the obverse are known. They are generally called after the appearance of "In God We Trust", to the left of Washington's head: the Light Motto, Medium Motto, and Heavy Motto.

For unknown reasons, the original reverse hub was used only in 1932; a new hub was used when coining resumed in 1934. The original style had a high rim around the reverse design, protecting it from wear so well that 1932 quarters in lower grade generally are about equally worn on either side. In later years, with a lowered rim, circulated silver pieces tend to be more worn on the reverse.

The fine-tuning of the design continued through the end of silver production with pieces dated 1964. During that time, the obverse was modified six times. One revision, in 1944, left Flanagan's initials, on the cutoff of the bust, distorted; this was adjusted the following year. Beginning in 1937, and continuing until the end of silver circulation production with pieces dated 1964, a very slightly different reverse was used for proof coins, as opposed to circulation pieces. This is most evident in examining the letters "es" in "States" which almost touch on circulation strikes, and display a separation on proofs.

The piece was struck in numbers exceeding 100 million in some years through 1964. The San Francisco Mint ceased striking coins after 1955; it struck no quarters that year or in 1949.

=== Clad composition ===
In 1964, there was a severe shortage of coins. Silver prices were rising, and the public responded by hoarding not only the wildly popular new coin, the Kennedy half dollar, but the other denominations, including the non-silver cent and nickel. Hopeful that issuing more 1964-dated coins would counter the speculation in them, the Treasury obtained Congressional authorization to continue striking 1964-dated coins into 1965.

The Mint's production of coins rapidly depleted the Treasury's stock of silver. Prices for the metal were rising to such an extent that, by early June 1965, a dollar in silver coin contained 93.3 cents' worth of it at market prices. On June 3, 1965, President Lyndon Johnson announced plans to eliminate silver from the dime and quarter in favor of a clad composition, with layers of copper-nickel on each side of a layer of pure copper. The half dollar was changed from 90% silver to 40%. Congress passed the Coinage Act of 1965 in July, under which the Mint transitioned from striking 1964-dated silver quarters to striking 1965-dated clad quarters. Beginning on August 1, 1966, the Mint began to strike 1966-dated pieces, and thereafter it resumed the normal practice of striking the current year's date on each piece.

The new clad quarters were struck without mint mark in 1965–1967, regardless of the mint of origin. Beginning in 1968, mint marks were used again, except that Philadelphia continued to issue coins without them. The San Francisco Mint had reopened, but from 1968, it struck quarters only for collectors, for the most part proof coins. The Mint adjusted both sides of the coin for the initiation of clad coinage, lowering the relief (the modified reverse design exists on some 1964-dated silver quarters). The obverse was slightly changed in 1974, with some details sharpened. Mint marks on post-1967 pieces are found on the lower right of the obverse, to the right of Washington's neck.

Beginning in 1976, and continuing over the following twenty years, Mint engravers modified the design a number of times. Quarters were struck at the West Point Mint between 1977 and 1979, but they bore no mint mark. The Philadelphia Mint's mint mark "P" was used on coins struck at that facility beginning in 1980. Coins dated 1982 and 1983, both from Philadelphia and Denver, command a large premium over face value when found in near-pristine condition.

Beginning in 1992, the Mint began selling silver proof sets, including a quarter struck in .900 silver; this has continued to the present day. Although President George H. W. Bush signed authorizing legislation for these pieces in 1990, coinage did not begin until 1992 due to difficulty in obtaining sufficient coinage blanks in .900 silver.

=== Bicentennial commemorative quarters ===
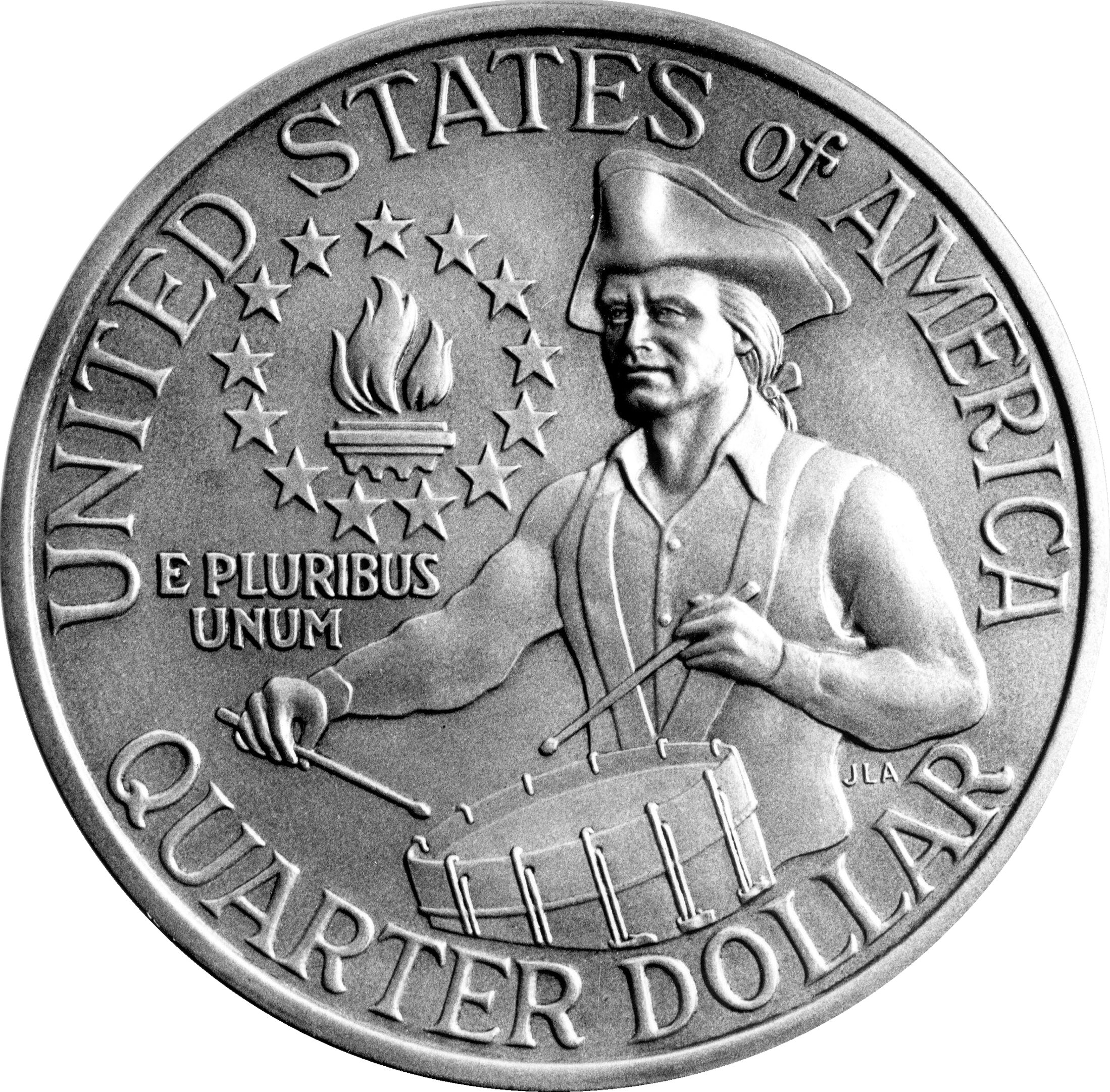
Jack L. Ahr's drummer design was struck for the United States Bicentennial.

In January 1973, Representative Richard C. White introduced legislation for commemorative dollars and half dollars for the 1976 United States Bicentennial. On June 6, Mint Director Mary Brooks testified before a congressional committee, and responding to concerns that only the two least-popular denominations would be changed, agreed to support the temporary redesign of the quarter as well. On October 18, 1973, President Richard Nixon signed legislation mandating a temporary redesign of the three denominations for all coins issued after July 4, 1975, and struck before January 1, 1977. These pieces bore the double date 1776–1976. In addition to circulation pieces, Congress mandated that 45 million Bicentennial coins be struck in 40% silver. Fearful of creating low-mintage pieces which might be hoarded as the cent recently had been, thus creating a shortage of quarters, in December 1974 the Mint obtained congressional approval to continue striking 1974-dated quarters, half dollars and dollars until Bicentennial coinage began. Accordingly, there are no 1975-dated quarters. Almost two billion Bicentennial quarters were struck, as the Mint sought to assure that there would be plenty of souvenirs of the anniversary. The Mint sold the silver sets, in both uncirculated and proof, for more than a decade before ending sales at the end of 1986. Jack L. Ahr's colonial drummer, which had appeared on the Bicentennial quarter, was replaced after 1976 by Flanagan's original reverse.

== Washington quarters since 1999 ==
=== 50 State quarters ===
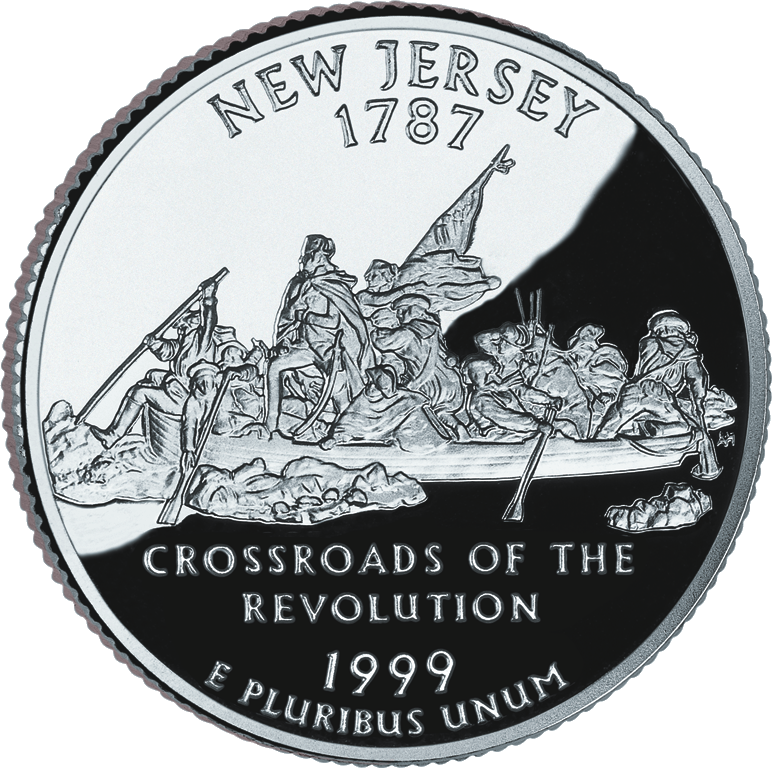
New Jersey's 1999 entry in the State Quarters series

At a congressional hearing in June 1995, Mint Director Philip N. Diehl and prominent numismatists urged Congress to pass legislation allowing a series of circulating commemorative coins similar to the quarters Canada had recently struck for its provinces. In response, Congress passed the United States Commemorative Coins Act of 1996, which was signed by President Bill Clinton on October 20, 1996. The act directed the Mint to study whether a series of commemorative quarters would be successful. The Mint duly studied the matter and reported favorably. Although the act had given Treasury Secretary Robert Rubin the authority to carry out the report by selecting new coin designs, Secretary Rubin preferred to await congressional action. The resulting 50 States Commemorative Coin Program Act was signed by President Clinton on December 1, 1997. Under the act, each of the fifty states would be honored with a new quarter, to be issued five a year beginning in 1999, with the sequence of issuance determined by the order the states had entered the Union. The act allowed the Secretary to determine the position of the required legends, such as "in god we trust" on the coin: To accommodate a large design on the reverse, "united states of america" and "quarter dollar" were moved to the obverse, and the bust of Washington shrunken slightly. A state's design would be selected by the Treasury Secretary on the recommendation of the state's governor.

As part of the series, the Mint sold collector's versions in proof, including pieces struck in .900 silver. The Mint also sold a large number of numismatic items, including rolls and bags of coins, collector's maps, and other items designed to encourage coin collecting among the general public. The Mint estimated that the government profited by $3 billion through seignorage on coins saved by the public and through other revenues, over what it would otherwise have earned.

=== District of Columbia and United States Territories quarters ===
Legislation to extend the program to the District of Columbia and the territories had been four times passed by the House of Representatives, but the Senate had failed to consider it each time. Provisions authorizing such a program were inserted into an urgent appropriations bill and passed in December 2007. The resultant 2009 District of Columbia and U.S. Territories Quarters Program maintained the Washington obverse but on the reverse displayed designs in honor of the District of Columbia, Puerto Rico, Guam, American Samoa, Virgin Islands, and the Northern Mariana Islands, all minted in 2009.

=== America the Beautiful quarters ===
In 2008, Congress passed the America's Beautiful National Parks Quarter Dollar Coin Act. This legislation called for 56 coins, one for each state or other jurisdiction, to be issued five per year beginning in 2010 and concluding in 2021. Each coin features a National Park Service site or national forest, one per jurisdiction. Flanagan's head of Washington was restored to bring out detail. In addition to the circulating pieces and collector's versions, bullion pieces with 5 troy ounces (160 g) of silver are being struck with the quarter's design.

In May 2012, the Mint announced plans to strike the first circulation-quality quarters at the San Francisco Mint since 1954, to be sold only at a premium in bags and rolls. All five 2012 designs were struck, the first circulation-quality coins struck at San Francisco since 1983 (when Lincoln cents were struck without mint mark), and the first with the S mint mark since the Anthony dollar in 1981 (struck for mint sets only). In 2019, the silver version of the quarter was struck in .999 silver, marking a permanent change from the previous .900. In 2019, the Mint struck 2,000,000 of each circulating quarter design at the West Point Mint bearing its mint mark W. These were released into circulation mixed in with new coins from Philadelphia or Denver. This continued in 2020 with the 2020-W quarters bearing a privy mark V75 inside a small cartouche on the obverse.

=== 2020s redesign ===
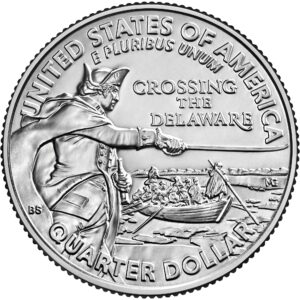
The reverse of 2021 issue of Washington quarter

Following the conclusion of the National Parks quarter series in 2021, Treasury Secretary Steven Mnuchin had the option of ordering a second round of 56 national parks quarters, but did not do so by the end of 2018 as required in the 2008 legislation. The quarter's design for 2021 therefore reverted to Flanagan's original obverse design, paired with a new reverse rendition of George Washington's crossing of the Delaware River on the night of December 25, 1776. In October 2019, the Citizens Coinage Advisory Committee (CCAC) met to consider designs, with the final choice made by Mnuchin. On December 25, 2020, the Mint announced the successful design, by Benjamin Sowards as sculpted by Michael Gaudioso. This quarter was released into circulation on April 5, 2021, and was minted until the end of 2021.

The Circulating Collectible Coin Redesign Act of 2020 (Pub. L. 116–330 (text) (PDF)) established three new series of quarters for the next decade. From 2022 to 2025, the Mint may produce up to five coins each year featuring prominent American women, with a new obverse design of Washington. In 2026, there will be up to five designs representing the United States Semiquincentennial. From 2027 to 2030, the Mint may produce up to five coins each year featuring youth sports. The obverse will also be redesigned in 2027, and even after 2030 is still to depict Washington.

The American Women quarters program issued five new reverse designs each year from 2022 to 2025 featuring the accomplishments and contributions made in various fields by women to American history and development. The obverse design features Fraser's portrait of Washington originally intended for the first Washington quarter in 1932.

On December 11, 2025, the Mint announced the five 1776~2026 designs. The CFA and CCAC had recommended designs with themes of the Declaration of Independence, U.S. Constitution, Abolition, Suffrage, and Civil Rights. The Mint accepted only the Declaration and Constitution themes, choosing five new designs. The other themes are the Mayflower Compact, the Revolutionary War and the Gettysburg Address.

== See also ==
- Washington quarter mintage figures
- Cultural depictions of George Washington

Preceded by Standing Liberty quarter	Washington quarter (1932–1974)	Succeeded by United States Bicentennial quarter
Preceded by United States Bicentennial quarter	Washington quarter (1977–1998)	Succeeded by 50 State quarters
Preceded by America the Beautiful quarters	Washington quarter (2021)	Succeeded by American Women quarters
