= Quarter (United States coin) =

Denomination of United States currency

Quarter dollar
- United States
- Value: 0.25 U.S. dollar
- Mass: 0.2 oz. (5.67 g)
- Diameter: 0.955 in. (24.257 mm)
- Thickness: 0.069 in. (1.7526 mm)
- Edge: 119 reeds
- Composition: From 1965: cupro-nickel (91.67% Cu, 8.33% Ni); 1932–1964: 0.2204 oz. (6.25 g), 90% silver, 10% copper
- Years of minting: 1796–present
- Catalog number: 1985

Obverse
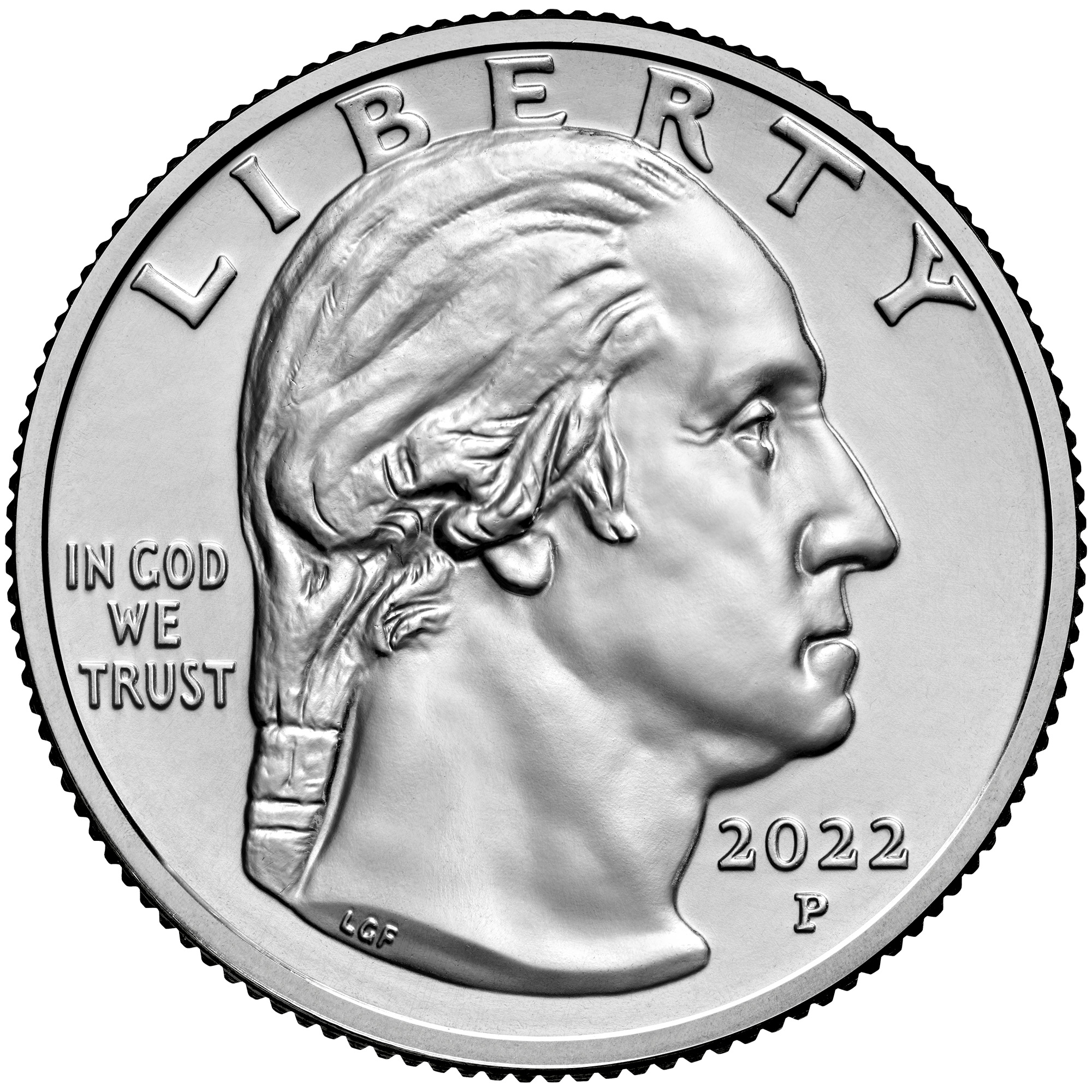
- Design: George Washington bust
- Designer: Laura Gardin Fraser
- Design date: 1931; 95 years ago
- Design used: 2022–2025

Reverse
- Design: Various

The quarter dollar, commonly called the quarter, is a United States coin valued at 25 cents, equal to 1/4 of a dollar ($0.25). Adorning its obverse in modern designs is the profile of George Washington, while its reverse design has undergone frequent changes since 1998. Since its initial production in 1796, the quarter dollar has held a significant place in American numismatics, with consistent production since 1831.

It has a diameter of 0.955 inch (24.26 mm) and a thickness of 0.069 inch (1.75 mm). Its current version is composed of two layers of cupronickel (75% copper, 25% nickel) clad on a core of pure copper. With the cupronickel layers comprising 1/3 of total weight, the coin's overall composition is therefore 8.33% nickel, 91.67% copper. Its weight is 0.1823 troy oz. or 0.2000 avoirdupois oz. (5.670 grams). Quarters minted before 1965 contain 90% silver and 10% copper.

== Designs before 1932 ==
The choice of a quarter-dollar as a denomination, as opposed to the 1/5 or the 20-cent piece that is more common elsewhere, originated with the practice of dividing Spanish milled dollars into eight wedge-shaped segments, which gave rise to the name "piece of eight" for that coin. "Two bits" (that is, two eighths of a piece of eight) is a common nickname for a quarter.

From 1796 the quarter was minted at 0.2377 oz. (6.739 g) composed 89.24% of silver (0.2121 oz. [6.014 g] fine silver), revised to 90% silver and 10% copper from 1838 to 1964. It weighed 0.2357 oz. (6.682 g) from 1838, 0.2194 oz. (6.22 g) from 1853, and 0.2204 oz. (6.25 g) from 1873 to 1964. Six designs, five regular and one commemorative, have been issued until 1930:

- Draped Bust 1796–1807
  - Draped Bust, Small Eagle 1796
  - Draped Bust, Heraldic Eagle 1804–1807
- Capped Bust 1815–1838
  - Capped Bust (Large Size), With Motto 1815–1828
  - Capped Bust (Small Size), No Motto 1831–1838
- Seated Liberty 1838–1891
  - Seated Liberty, No Motto 1838–1865
  - Seated Liberty, With Motto 1866–1891
- Barber 1892–1916
- Isabella quarter commemorative 1893
- Standing Liberty 1916–1930
  - Standing Liberty (Type 1) 1916–1917 (featured an image of Liberty with one of her breasts exposed)
  - Standing Liberty (Type 2 or Type 2a) 1917–1924
  - Standing Liberty (Type 3 or Type 2b) 1925–1930
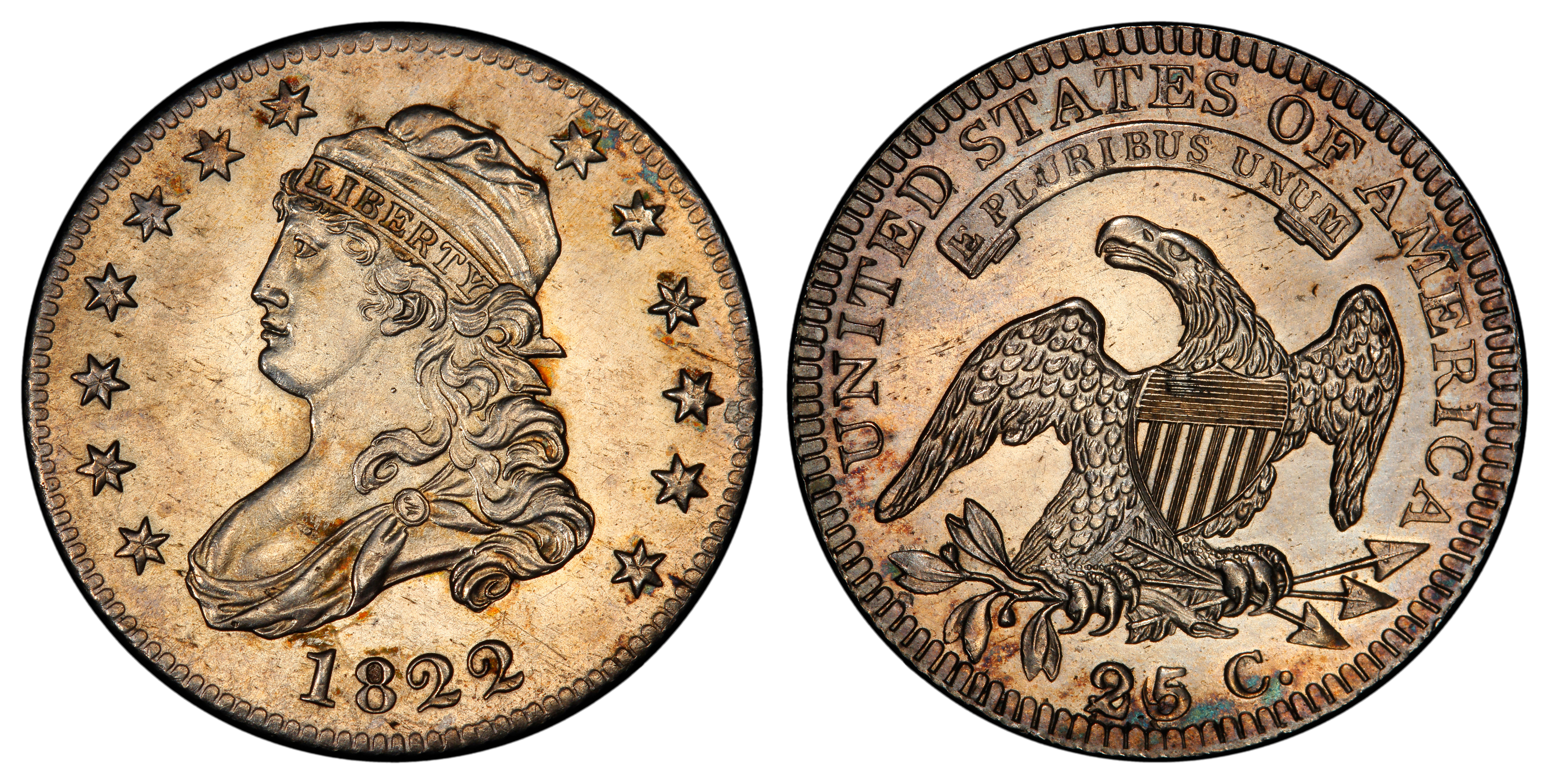
Capped Bust quarter, 1822

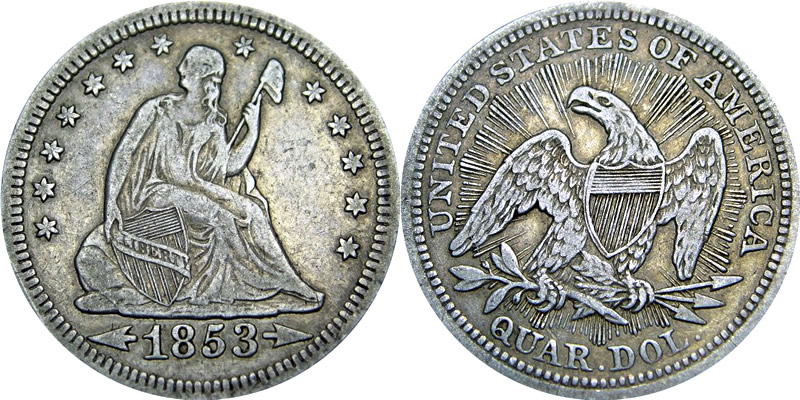
Liberty Seated quarter with arrows and rays, 1853

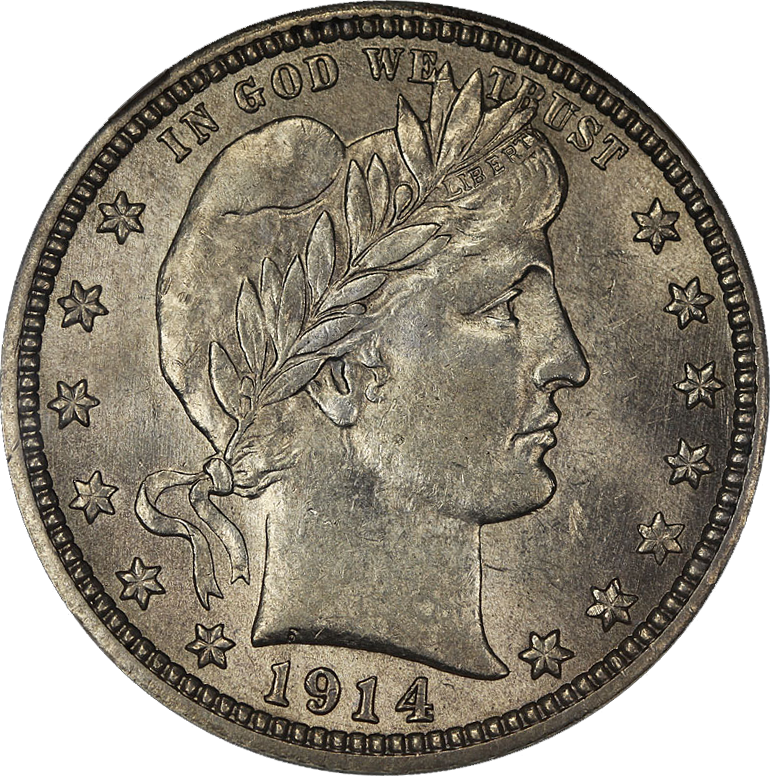
Barber quarter, 1914

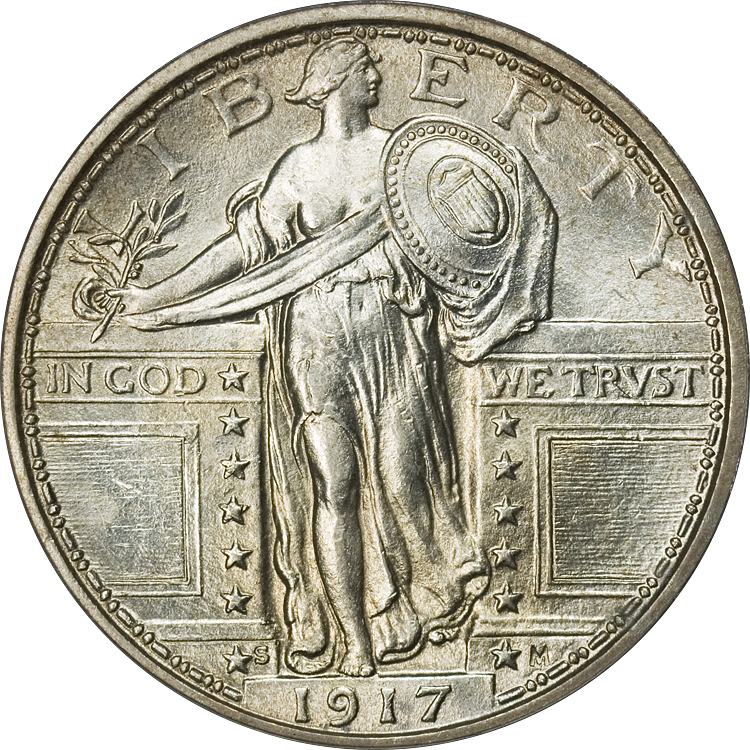
Type 1 Standing Liberty Quarter with bare breast, 1917

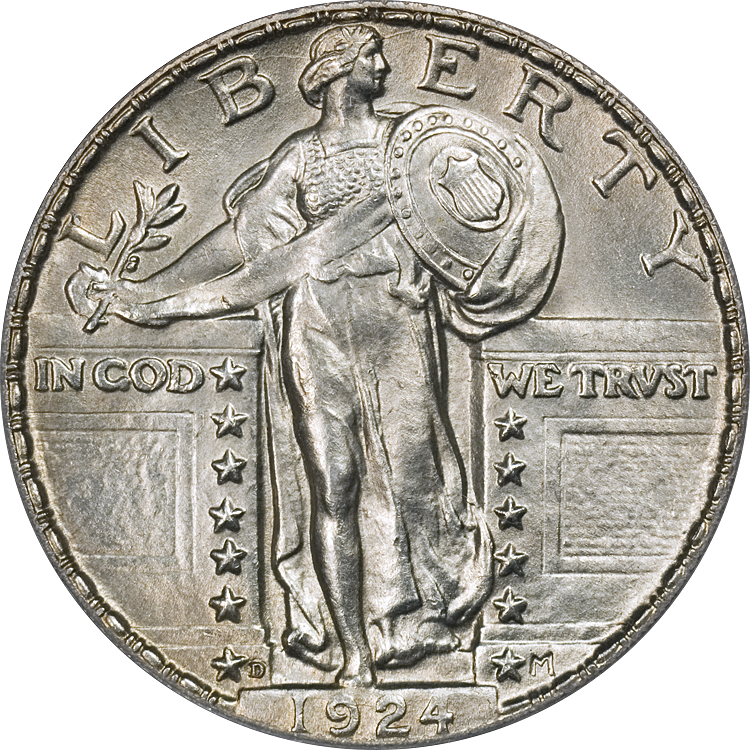
Standing Liberty quarter, 1924

== Washington quarter designs ==
The original version of the Washington quarter was issued from 1932 to 1998 and was briefly stopped in 1933, but continued in 1934. The coin was designed by sculptor John Flanagan. The obverse depicted George Washington facing left, with "Liberty" above the head, the date below, and "In God We Trust" in the left field. The reverse depicts an eagle with wings outspread, perched on a bundle of arrows, framed below by two olive branches.

It was minted at 0.2204 oz. (6.25 g) in 90% silver and 10% copper until 1964, when rising silver prices forced the change into the present-day cupronickel-clad-copper composition. As of 2011, it cost 11.14 cents to produce each coin.

Regular issue Washington quarters:

- Silver quarters, 1932 & 1934–1964
- Clad composition quarter, 1965–1998
- 50 State quarters, 1999–2008
- District of Columbia and United States Territories quarters, 2009
- America the Beautiful quarters, 2010–2021
- Washington Crossing the Delaware, 2021
- American Women quarters, 2022–2025
- Semiquincentennial quarters, 2026
- Youth Sports quarters, 2027–2030

Commemorative and bullion issue Washington quarters:

- United States Bicentennial coinage quarter in clad & 40% silver, 1975–1976 (all were dated 1776–1976)
- Silver proof set quarter, 1992–1998
- America the Beautiful silver bullion coins in 5-ounce silver, 2010–2021
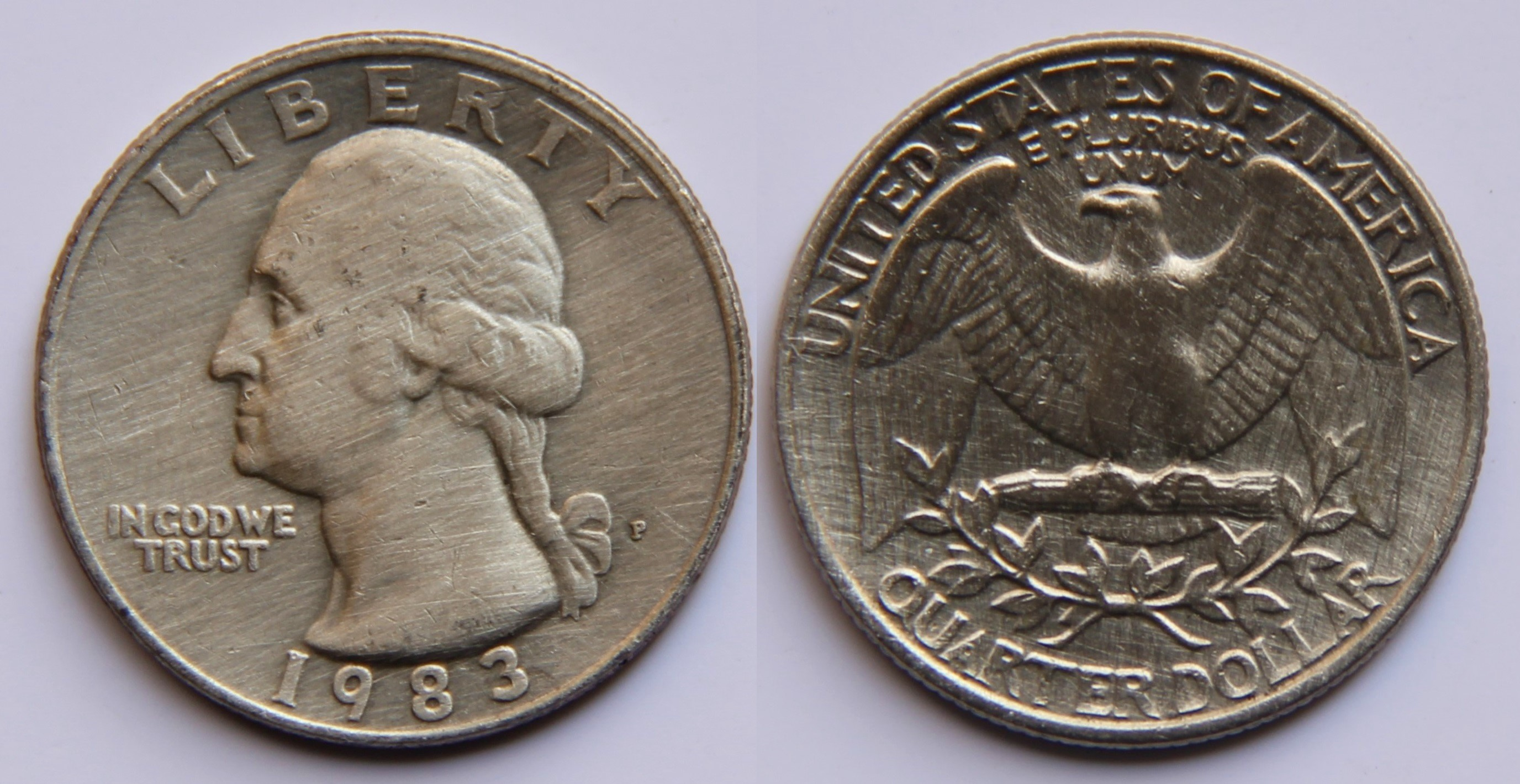
Obverse and reverse of Washington quarter, 1983 (clad composition)

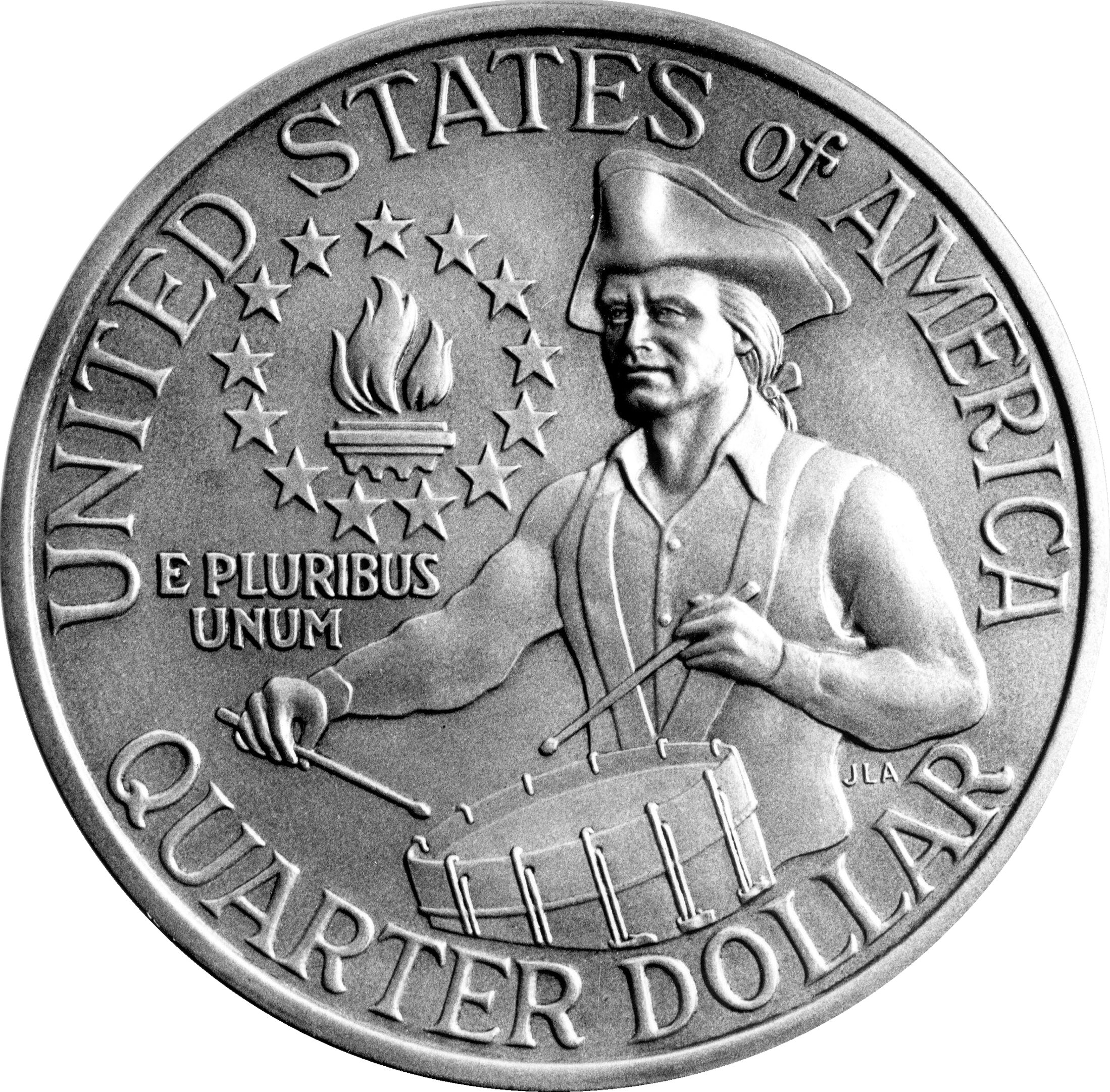
Reverse of bicentennial quarter, 1976

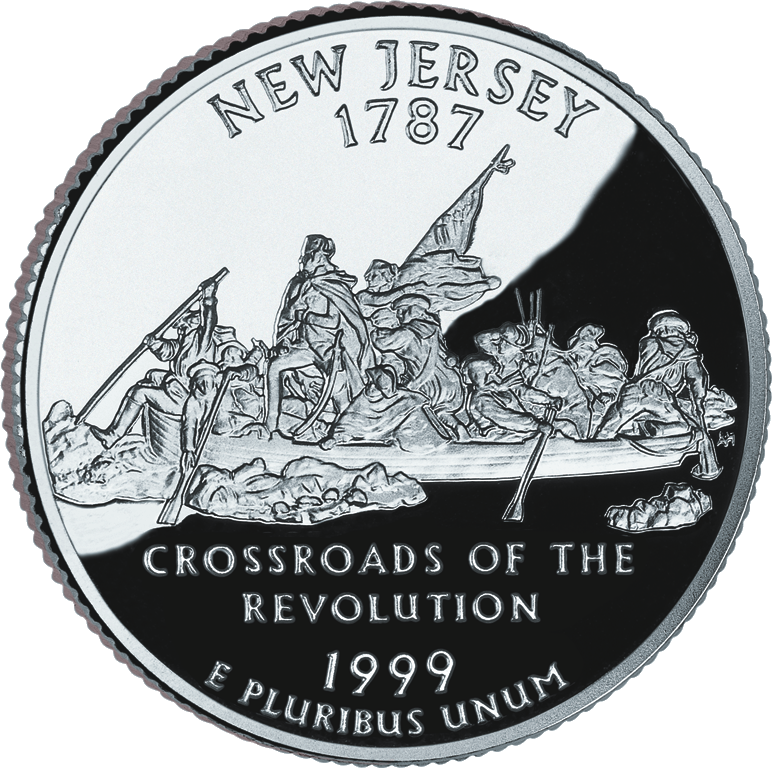
New Jersey-designed State Quarter, 1999

=== US states and territories (1999–2009) ===
In 1999, the 50 State quarters program of circulating commemorative quarters began. These have a modified Washington obverse and a different reverse for each state, ending the former Washington quarter's production completely. On January 23, 2007, the House of Representatives passed H.R. 392 extending the state quarter program one year to 2009, to include the District of Columbia and the five inhabited U.S. territories: Puerto Rico, Guam, American Samoa, the United States Virgin Islands, and the Commonwealth of the Northern Mariana Islands. The bill passed through the Senate, and was signed into legislation by President George W. Bush as part of Pub. L. 110–161: the Consolidated Appropriations Act (text) (PDF), on December 27, 2007. The typeface used in the state quarter series varies a bit from one state to another, but is generally derived from Albertus.

=== America the Beautiful and Washington Crossing the Delaware (2010–2021) ===
In June 2008, the America's Beautiful National Parks Quarter Dollar Coin Act of 2008, H.R. 6184, was introduced to the House of Representatives. On December 23, 2008, President Bush signed the bill into law as Pub. L. 110–456 (text) (PDF). The America the Beautiful quarters program began in 2010 and ended in 2021, lasting 11 years and depicting a natural or historic site for each state and territory.

Following the conclusion of the America the Beautiful quarter series in 2021, Treasury Secretary Steven Mnuchin had the option of ordering a second round of 56 quarters, but did not do so by the end of 2018 as required in the 2008 legislation. The quarter's design for 2021 therefore reverted to Flanagan's original obverse design, paired with a new reverse rendition of Washington crossing the Delaware River on the night of December 25, 1776.

In October 2019, the Citizens Coinage Advisory Committee (CCAC) met to consider designs, with the final choice made by Mnuchin. On December 25, 2020, the Mint announced the successful design, by Benjamin Sowards as sculpted by Michael Gaudioso. This quarter was released into circulation on April 5, 2021, and was minted until the end of 2021.

=== American Women (2022–2025) ===
The Circulating Collectible Coin Redesign Act of 2020 (Pub. L. 116–330 (text) (PDF)) established three new series of quarters for the next decade featuring prominent American women, designs celebrating the United States Semiquincentennial, and featuring youth sports. The obverse will be redesigned in 2027, and after 2030 will continue to depict Washington.

The American Women Quarters program featured five reverse designs each year, from 2022 to 2025, celebrating the accomplishments and contributions made in various fields by women to American history. The program commemorated the centennial of the Nineteenth Amendment to the United States Constitution. The obverse features Laura Gardin Fraser's portrait of George Washington originally intended for the first Washington quarter in 1932.

=== Semiquincentennial (2026) ===
As part of the United States Semiquincentennial, the country's 250th anniversary, five new quarter designs are being issued only in 2026. These celebrate the Mayflower Compact, the American Revolutionary War, the United States Declaration of Independence, the Constitution of the United States, and the Gettysburg Address.

=== Collecting silver Washington quarters ===
The "silver series" of Washington quarters spans from 1932 to 1964. Certain mints did not mint Washington quarters in some years. No known examples of quarters were made in 1933. San Francisco abstained in 1934 and 1949, and stopped after 1955, until it resumed in 1968 by way of making proofs. Denver did not make quarters in 1938.

Proof examples from 1936 to 1942 and 1950 to 1967 were struck at the Philadelphia Mint. In 1968, proof production was shifted to the San Francisco Mint. The current rarities for the Washington quarter "silver series" are:

Branch mintmarks are D = Denver, S = San Francisco. Coins without mintmarks were all made at the main Mint in Philadelphia. This listing is for business strikes, not proofs:

- 1932-D
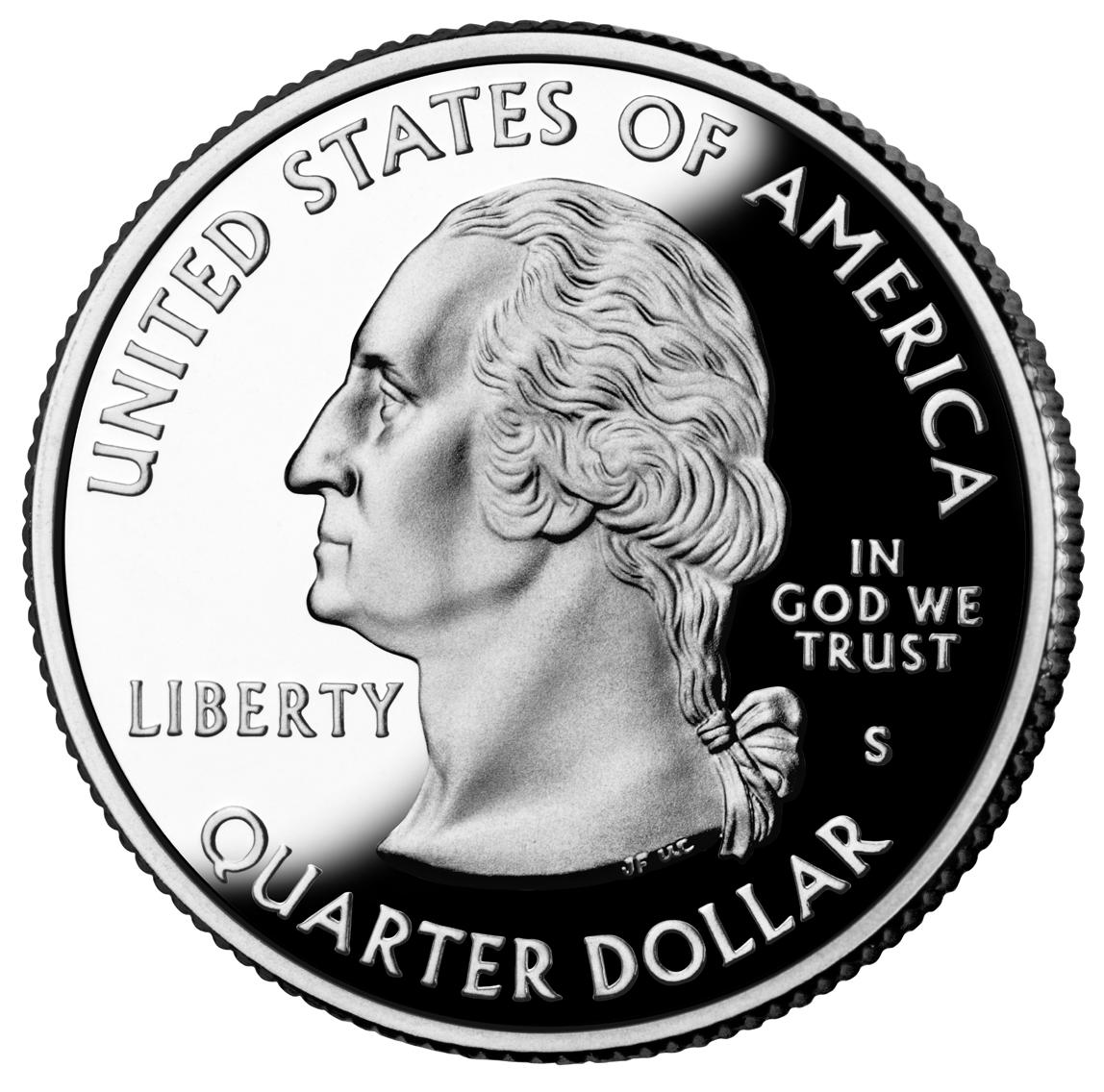
- This quarter shows the "S" for San Francisco
  1932-S
- 1934 – with Doubled Die Obverse (DDO)
- 1935-D
- 1936-D
- 1937 – with Doubled Die Obverse (DDO)
- 1937-S
- 1938-S
- 1939-S
- 1940-D
- 1942-D – with Doubled Die Obverse (DDO)
- 1943 – with Doubled Die Obverse (DDO)
- 1943-S – with Doubled Die Obverse (DDO)
- 1950-D/S Over mintmark (coin is a 1950-D, with underlying S mintmark)
- 1950-S/D Over mintmark (coin is a 1950-S, with underlying D mintmark)

The 1940-D, 1936-D and the 1935-D coins, and many others in the series, are considerably more valuable than other quarters. This is not due to their mintages, but because they are harder to find in high grades, a situation referred to as "condition rarity". Many of these coins are worth only melt value in low grades. Other coins in the above list are expensive because of their extremely low mintages, such as the 1932 Denver and San Francisco issues. The overstruck mintmark issues are also scarce and expensive, especially in the higher grades. Even so, they may not have the same popularity as overdates found in pre-Washington quarter series.

The 1934 Philadelphia strike appears in two versions: one with a light motto [for "In God We Trust"], which is the same as that used on the 1932 strikings, and the other a heavy motto seen after the dies were reworked. Except in the highest grades, the difference in value between the two is minor.

The mint mark on the coin is located on the reverse, beneath the wreath on which the eagle is perched. It will either carry the mint mark "D" for the Denver Mint, "S" for the San Francisco Mint, or be blank if minted at the Philadelphia Mint.

=== Collecting clad Washington quarters ===
in 1965, the copper-nickel clad Washington quarter was first issued. As part of the switch, the Denver mintmark was added in 1968, which did not reappear on any US coin denomination until 1968. For the first three years of clad production, in lieu of proof sets, specimen sets were specially sold as "Special Mint Sets" minted at the San Francisco mint in 1965, 1966, and 1967. Deep Cameo versions of these coins are highly valued because of their rarity.

Currently, there are few examples in the clad series that are valued as highly as the silver series, but there are certain extraordinary dates or variations. The deep cameo versions of proofs from 1965 to 1971 and 1981 Type 2 are highly valued because of their scarcity. High grade examples of quarters from certain years of the 1980s, such as 1981–1987 are valued, because of scarcity in high grades due to high circulation. In 1982 and 1983, no mint sets were produced, making it harder to find mint state examples. Any coin from 1981 to 1994 graded in MS67 is worth upwards of $1,000.

The mint mark on the coin is currently located on the obverse at the bottom right hemisphere under the supposed date. In 1965–1967, cupro-nickel coins bore no mint mark. Quarters minted in 1968–1979 were stamped with a "D" for the Denver mint, an "S" for the San Francisco mint (proof coins only), or blank for Philadelphia. Starting in 1980, the Philadelphia mint was allowed to add its mint mark to all coins, except the one-cent piece. Twenty-five-cent pieces minted from 1980 onwards are stamped with "P" for the Philadelphia mint, "D" for the Denver mint, or "S" for San Francisco mint.

Until 2012, the "S" mint mark was used only on proof coins. Beginning with the El Yunque (Puerto Rico) design in the America the Beautiful quarters program, the US Mint began selling, at a premium, uncirculated 40-coin rolls and 100-coin bags of quarters with the San Francisco mint mark. These coins were not included in the 2012 or later uncirculated sets or the three-coin ATB quarter sets, which consisted of an uncirculated "P" and "D" and proof "S" specimen. No "S" mint-marked quarters are being released into circulation, so that mintages will be determined solely by direct demand for the "S" mint-marked coins.

In 2019, the West Point Mint released two million of each of the five designs that year, with a "W" mint mark for general circulation, in a move intended to spur coin collecting. This was continued in 2020, which was the final year of the "W" mint marked quarters, as no quarters with the mint mark have been produced since.

== See also ==
- 50 State quarters (1999–2008)
- America the Beautiful quarters (2010–2021)
- America the Beautiful silver bullion coins, 5 troy ounce silver bullion coins based on America the Beautiful quarters
- DC and US Territories quarters (2009)
- Quarter (Canadian coin)
- United States Mint coin production
- United States Bicentennial coinage (1975–1976)
- United States quarter mintage figures
- Washington quarter
