= John Flanagan (sculptor) =

American sculptor

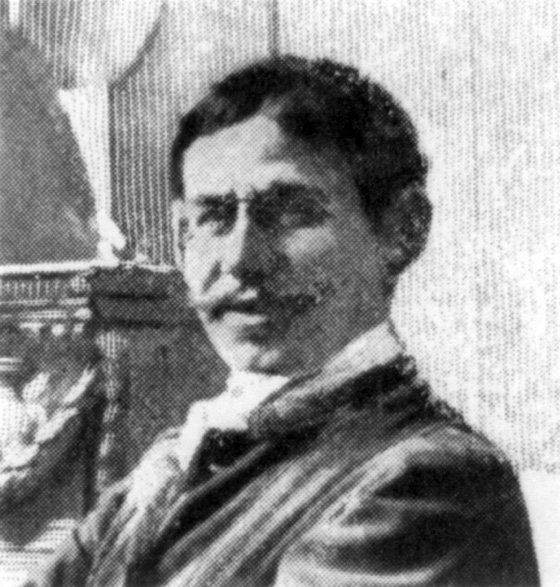
- Flanagan, 1900
- Born: April 4, 1865; Newark, New Jersey, USA
- Died: March 28, 1952 (aged 86); Manhattan, New York, USA
- Resting place: Ferncliff Cemetery and Mausoleum; Hartsdale, New York, USA
- Education: Cooper Union; Manhattan, New York
- Known for: Sculpture

John F. Flanagan (also cited John Flannigan in early records; April 4, 1865–March 28, 1952) was a sculptor who was widely known for his statuary and plaquettes but recognized foremost for his designs of coinage and commemorative medals. Among his best known designs are the obverse (front) and reverse of the United States quarter dollar featuring the profile of George Washington, a coin that has been in continuous circulation with some modifications since 1932.

== Washington quarter ==
Flanagan designed the Washington U.S. quarter dollar coin, which was issued in 1932. Flanagan's initials can be found at the base of Washington's neck. He designed both sides of the quarter, adapting the obverse profile of the United States's first president from a bust of Washington initially produced by French neoclassical sculptor Jean-Antoine Houdon in 1786. His original design for the quarter continued through 1998, after which the new "State Quarter" series resulted in the modification of Flanagan's portrait of Washington and the removal altogether of the reverse design. In 2021, after the "America the Beautiful" coin series ended, Flanagan's design for the obverse of the quarter returned for one year, with the reverse changed to Benjamin Sowards' engraving of Washington crossing the Delaware.

US Quarter engraved by Flanagan.
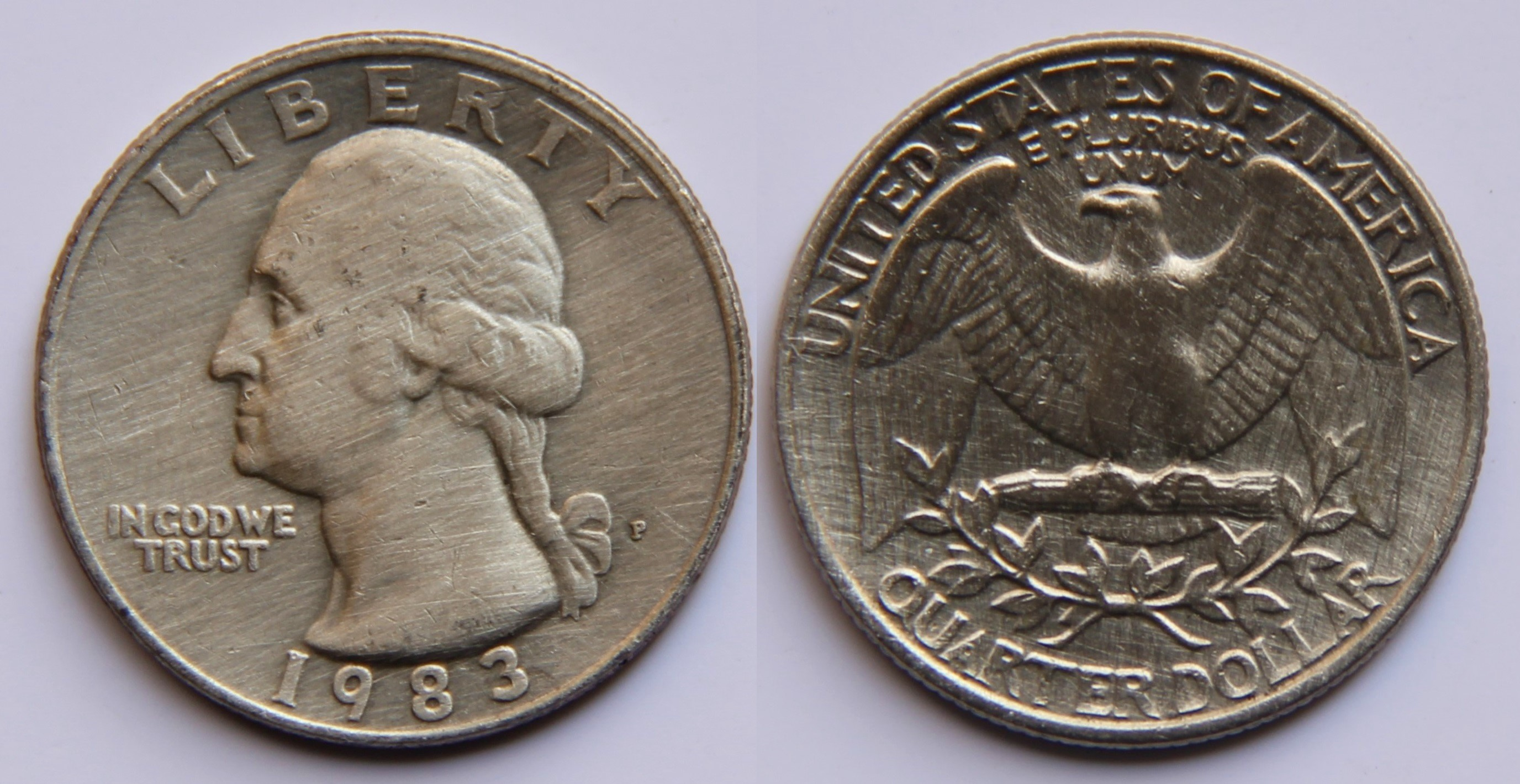
First side of the image: Obverse: Portrait of George Washington, year and United States national motto (In God We Trust).
Second side of the image: Reverse: Bald eagle with wings spread and standing on a shaft of arrows with two olive sprays. Face-value, the motto "E PLURIBUS UNUM" (Out of many, one) and country name.
35,924,089,384 coins minted from 1965 to 1998.

== Medallic work ==
Flanagan was a prolific medallic artist. Among his more important works, he designed the official medal of the Panama-Pacific International Exposition of 1915. He later sculpted the Verdun Medal, a gift of the United States to France commemorating the World War I Battle of Verdun. The inscription on it reads, 'They Shall Not Pass', and the medal is found in the Lafayette Database of American Art in French National collections. Flanagan also created the first issue of the influential Circle of Friends of the Medallion series, 1909's Hudson-Fulton Celebration, and contributed to the successor Society of Medalists series with his Aphrodite-Swift Runners medal of 1932.

== Other work ==
From 1885 to 1890, Flanagan was a studio assistant to Augustus St. Gaudens and worked on several large projects. A bronze portrait bust of St. Gaudens by Flanagan of 1924 exists in several copies, in the Metropolitan Museum of Art, National Gallery of Art, New York University and elsewhere.

In 1911, he was elected into the National Academy of Design as an Associate member, and became a full Academician in 1928.

== Gallery ==
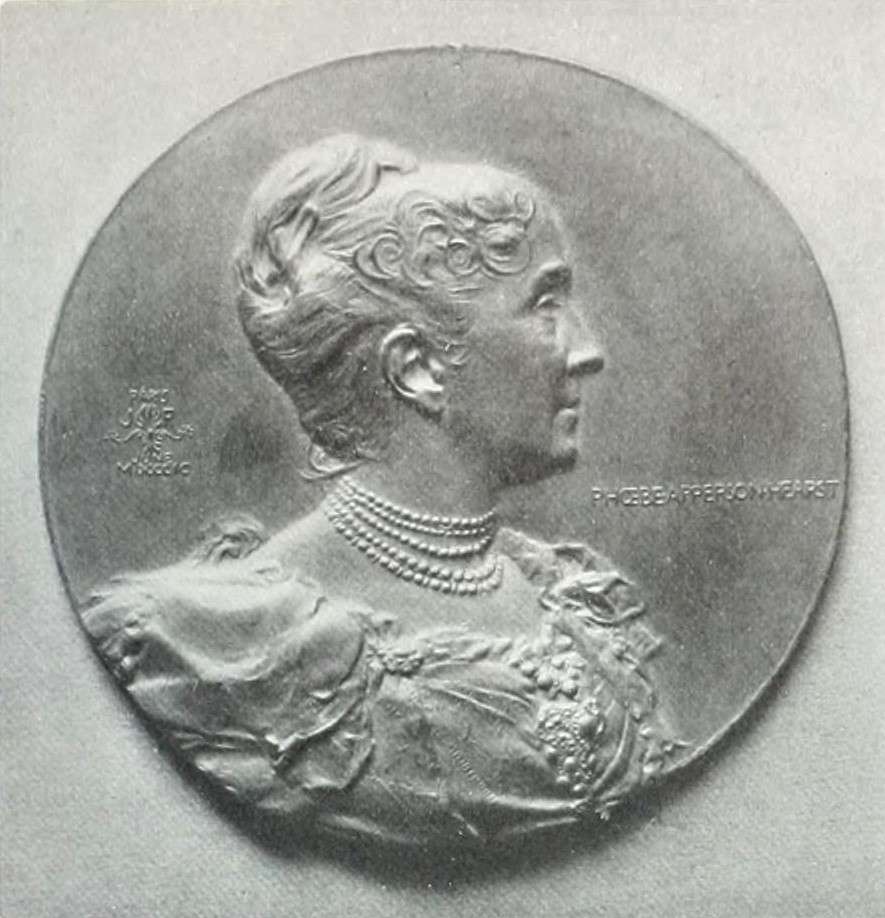
Portrait medal of Phoebe Apperson Hearst by John Flanagan, 1890.

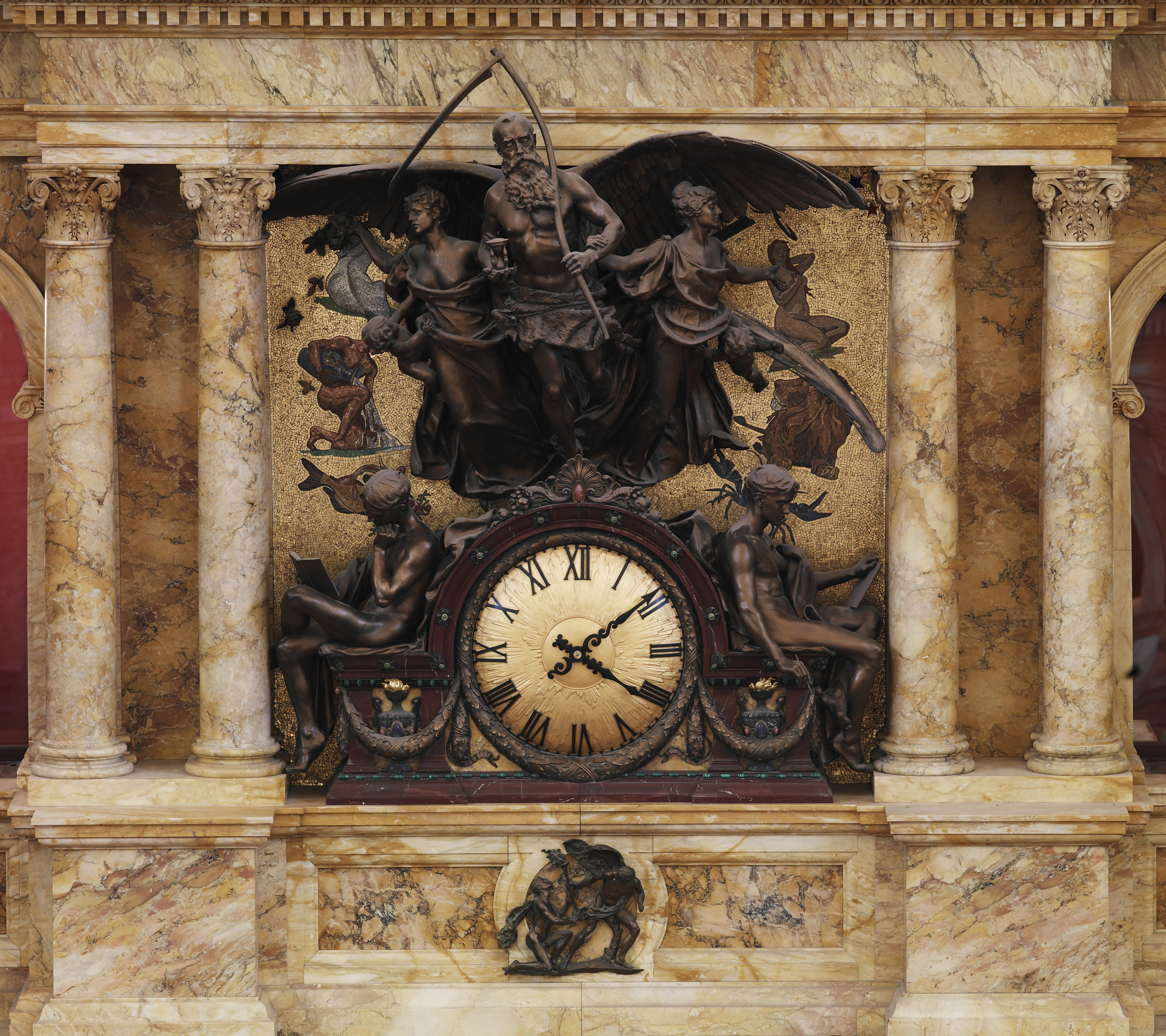
The Rotunda Clock (1896), by John Flanagan. Library of Congress Thomas Jefferson Building, Washington, D.C.

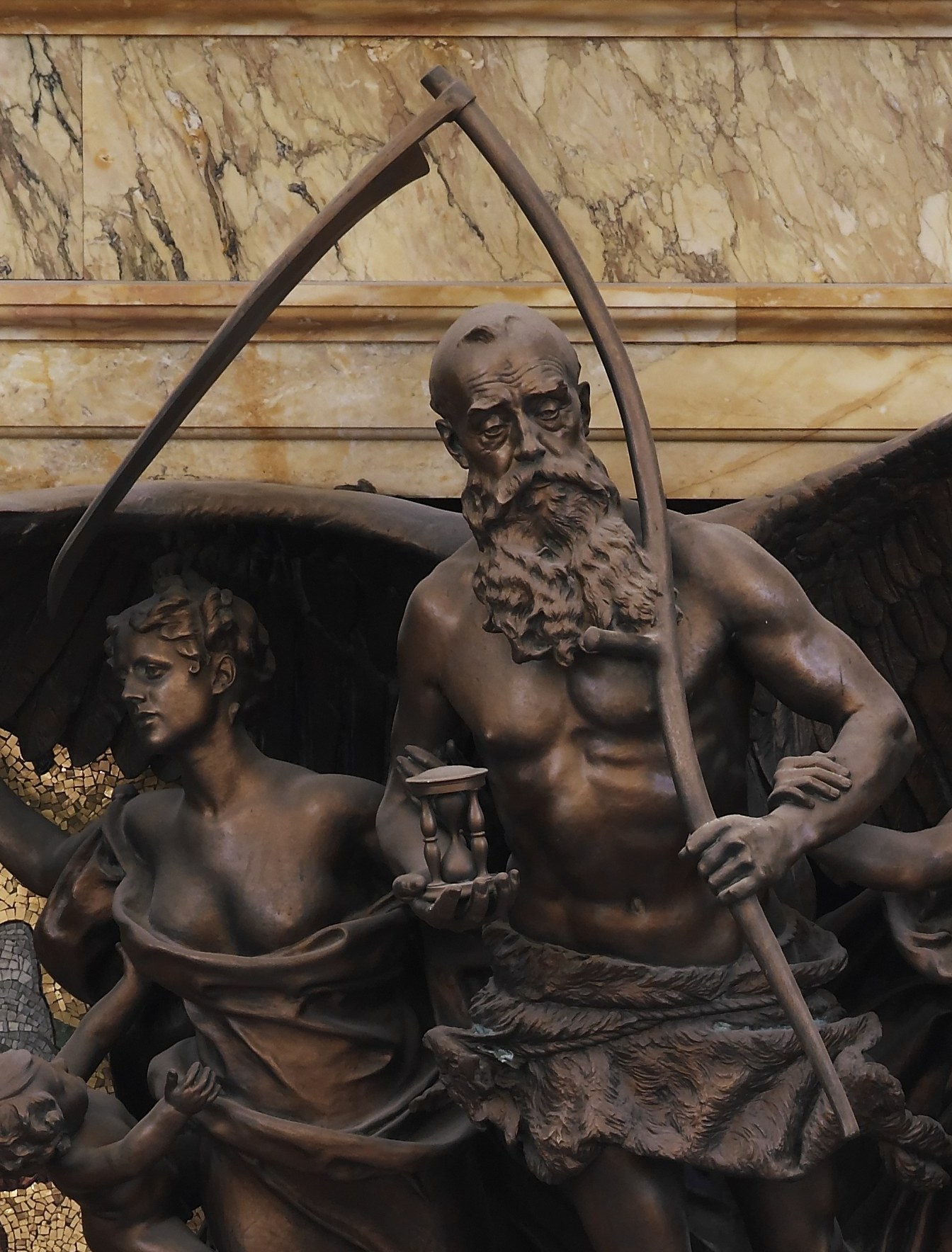
Detail of a winged Father Time in the Rotunda Clock.

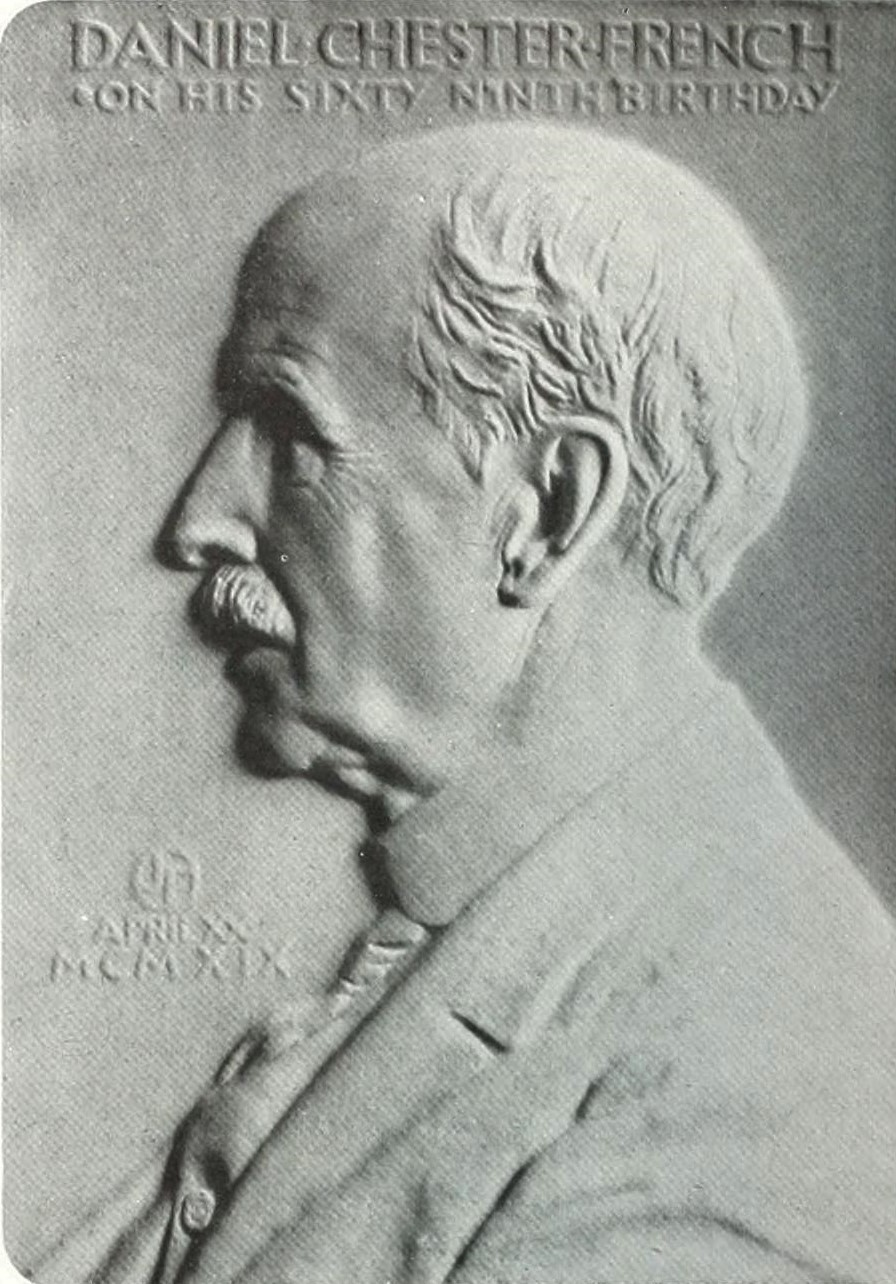
Profile of fellow American sculptor Daniel Chester French by Flanagan, 1919.

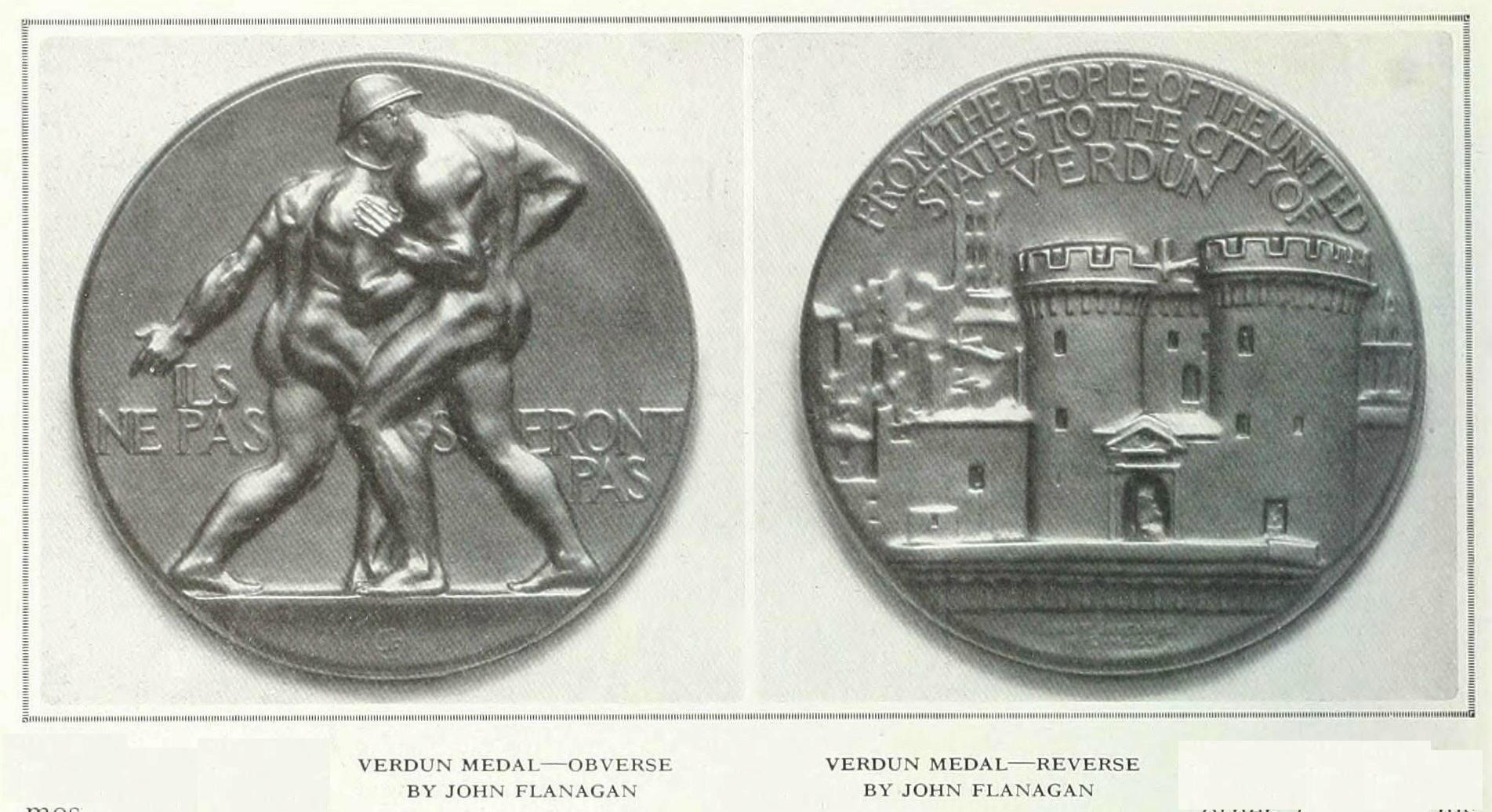
Verdun Medal by Flanagan, c. 1920.

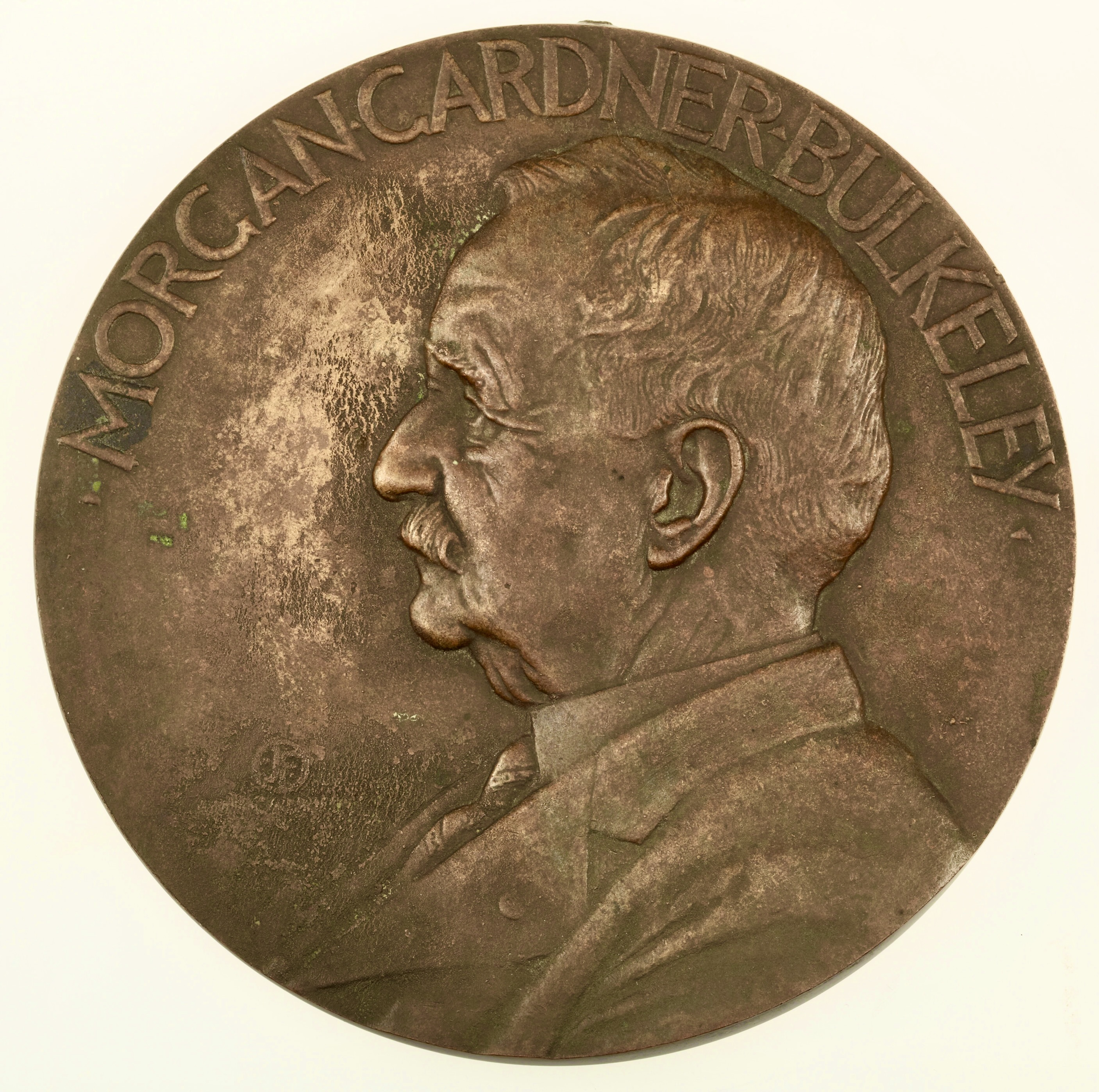
1896 medal honoring former Connecticut governor Morgan G. Bulkeley

== See also ==
- List of Saltus Award winners
