= J. Sanford Saltus Medal Award =

Lifetime achievement award given by the American Numismatic Society

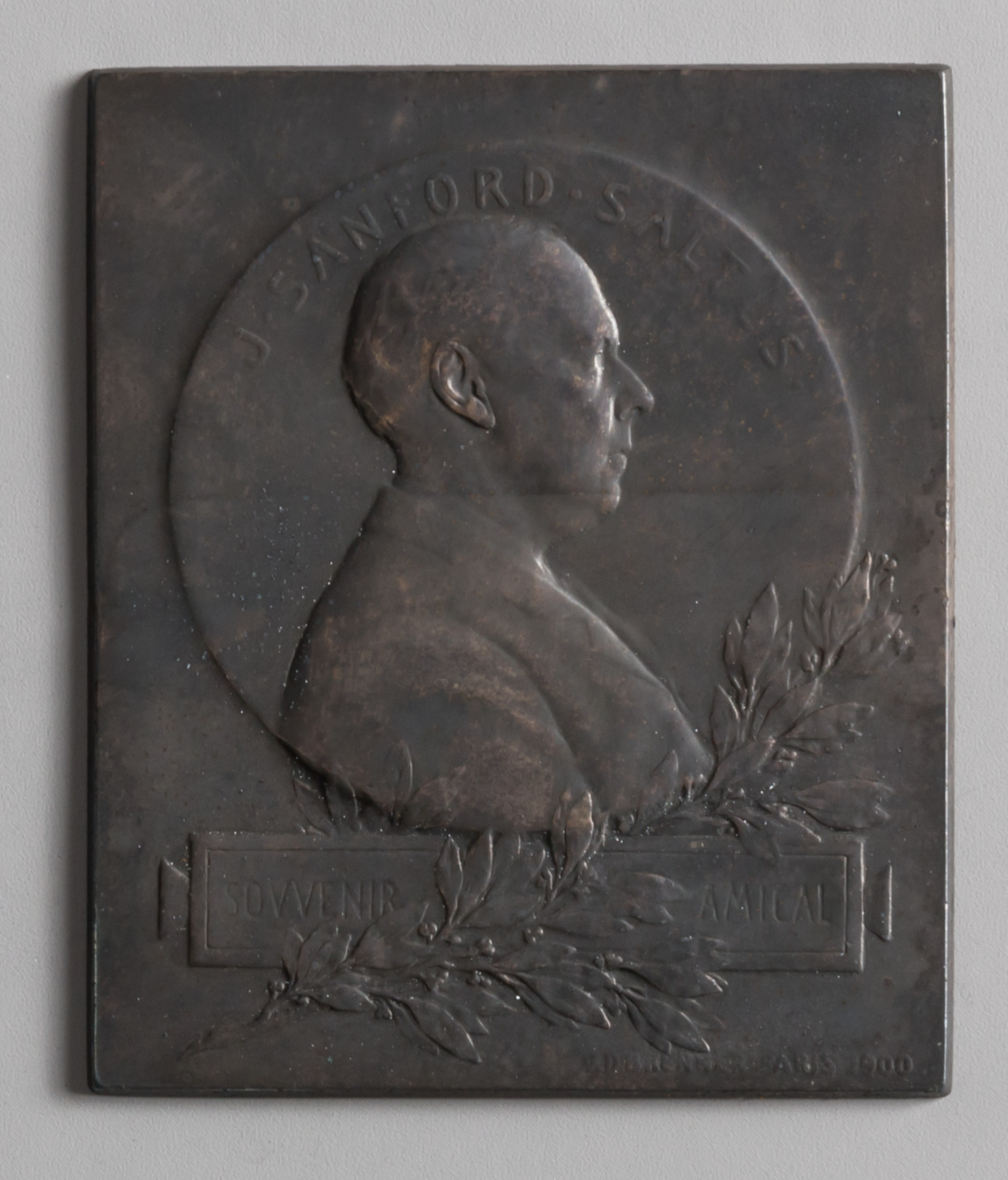
J Sanford Saltus

The J. Sanford Saltus Medal Award is an annual award made to artists "for lifetime achievement in medallic art". It is administered by the American Numismatic Society. The award was first awarded in 1913 on the initiative of J. Sanford Saltus to reward sculptors "for distinguished achievement in the field of the art of the medal". The medal was designed in silver by Adolph A. Weinman, himself the second winner of the award. While this medal was at first only given to Americans, since 1983 foreign artists are also eligible to receive this award.

== Recipients ==
- 1919 – James Earle Fraser
- 1920 – Adolph A. Weinman
- 1921 – John Flanagan
- 1922 – Victor D. Brenner
- 1923 – Hermon Atkins MacNeil
- 1925 – Paul Manship
- 1926 – Laura Gardin Fraser
- 1927 – Anthony de Francisci
- 1937 – Lee Lawrie
- 1946 – Chester Beach
- 1948 – Henry Kreis
- 1949 – Carl Paul Jennewein
- 1950 – Gertrude K. Lathrop
- 1951 – Albert Laessle
- 1952 – Bruce Moore
- 1953 – Walker Hancock
- 1954 – Sidney Waugh
- 1955 – Theodore Spicer-Simson
- 1956 – Thomas G. Lo Medico
- 1959 – Abram Belskie
- 1960 – Bruno Mankowski
- 1964 – Robert Weinman
- 1966 – Albino Manca
- 1967 – Donald De Lue
- 1968 – Michael Lantz
- 1969 – Stanley F. Martineau
- 1970 – Joseph Kiselewski
- 1975 – Granville Carter
- 1979 – Karen Worth
- 1980 – Agop Agopoff
- 1983 – Guido Veroi
- 1984 – Marcel Jovine
- 1985 – Edward R. Grove
- 1986 – Kauko Räsänen
- 1987 – John Cook
- 1988 – Jiří Harcuba
- 1990 – Keiichi Uryu
- 1991 – Eugene L. Daub
- 1992 – Mico Kaufman
- 1993 – Ewa Olszewska-Borys
- 1994 – Marianne Letterie
- 1995 – Alex Shagin
- 1996 – Nicola Moss
- 1997 – Leonda Finke
- 1998 – Helder Batista
- 1999 – Jeanne Stevens-Sollman
- 2000 – Bernd Göbel
- 2001 – Gustaaf T.M. Hellegers
- 2002 – Toivo Jaatinen
- 2003 – Dora de Pédery-Hunt
- 2005 – Theo van de Vathorst
- 2009 – Ron Dutton
- 2011 – João Duarte
- 2014 – Pawel Leski
- 2017 - Bogomil Nikolov (Bulgaria)
- 2018 - Geer Steyn (Holland)
- 2019 – Mashiko
- 2020 – Anna Franziska Schwarzbach (Germany)
