= Louise Stevens Bryant =

American public health specialist, and writer

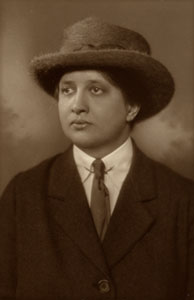
Publicity photo of Louise Stevens Bryant for the Girl Scouts of the USA

Louise Stevens Bryant (1885 – 1956) was an American public health specialist, writer, editor and publicist. She was especially involved in the fields of human sexuality and maternal health, and was the executive secretary of Robert Latou Dickinson's Committee on Maternal Health from 1927 to 1935.

== Early life and education ==
Louise Stevens Bryant was born in Paris, France to American parents in 1885. Following her father's death in 1888, her mother moved Louise and her sister Ernesta first to New York City, and then to Rahway, New Jersey, where the girls were childhood friends of sisters Ida and Carolyn Wells.

Bryant attended Smith College and graduated with a Bachelor of Science in 1908. She then worked at the Russell Sage Foundation, where she worked in school reform, followed by the University of Pennsylvania, where she worked in Lightner Witmer's clinical psychology clinic for children and simultaneously studied for a PhD in medical science, which she received in 1914.

== Career ==
After completing her PhD, she worked at the Philadelphia Municipal Court, first as chief of the criminal department's division for women, and then, during the war, as a statistician for the chief of staff.

Bryant served on the Statistical Bureau of the War Industries Board in Washington, D.C. for one year, from 1918 to 1919. She wrote statistical reports on food supplies for the U.S. Army and for the Allies. She also worked with the statistical branch of the United States Chiefs of Staff during this period.

Then, from 1919 to 1923 she worked for the Girl Scouts of the USA as the educational and publications secretary.

In 1923, Bryant joined the public health field as an employee of the New York-based Committee on Dispensary Development. In 1927 she was hired by Robert Latou Dickinson as the executive secretary of the National Committee on Maternal Health (CMH). During Bryant's time as secretary, she edited numerous CMH publications, including Control of Conception, a 1931 handbook of contraceptive techniques, and other academic studies on sexology, contraception, abortion and sterility. She left the CMH in 1935 after a disagreement with Dickinson.

Bryant served as the American representative of the English sexologist Havelock Ellis and helped him to negotiate the second American publication of his seven-volume work Studies in the Psychology of Sex in 1933. She worked as a publicist for the American Association of University Women from 1938 to 1952.

== Personal life ==
Louise Stevens Bryant married Arthur Bryant in 1909; they divorced in 1912.

Bryant's romantic partner for almost 35 years was Lura Beam, a writer and teacher. They met around 1920 in New York City. After Bryant's death in 1956, Beam published a biography about her titled Bequest From a Life; a Biography of Louise Stevens Bryant (1963).

== Death ==
Bryant died of a heart ailment at Bronxville Hospital on August 19, 1956. She was 70 years old.

== Works ==
- School Feeding, Its History and Practice at Home and Abroad (1913) Philadelphia and London: J.B. Lippincott Co. [with Philander Priestly Claxton]
- The Game (1916) Alexandria, Va.: Alexander Street Press
- Educational Work of Girl Scouts (1921) Washington, D.C.: United States Government Printing Office
- Better Doctoring, Less Dependency (1927) New York
- Control of Contraception (1932) London: Baillière & Co [with Robert Latou Dickinson]
