= Mico Kaufman =

Romanian sculptor

- Born: 1924; Buzău, Kingdom of Romania
- Died: December 12, 2016 (aged 91–92)
- Occupation: Sculptor

Mico Kaufman (1924–2016) was a sculptor. Born in Buzău, Kingdom of Romania in 1924, Kaufman was best known for making inaugural medals for United States Presidents Gerald Ford, Ronald Reagan, and George H. W. Bush. He survived a Nazi labor camp during World War II and in 1951 immigrated to the United States. He lived in Tewksbury, MA and died on December 12, 2016, at the age of 92.

== Early life ==
Kaufman was born in Buzău, Romania on January 3, 1924. He was educated at the Academy of Fine Arts in Rome, and the Academy of Fine Arts in Florence, Italy. He is related to violinist Louis Kaufman. For three years during World War II, Kaufman worked in a forced labor camp. He left the camp at the age of 21 and eventually immigrated to the United States in 1951 and moved to Tewksbury, MA in 1964.

== Body of Works ==
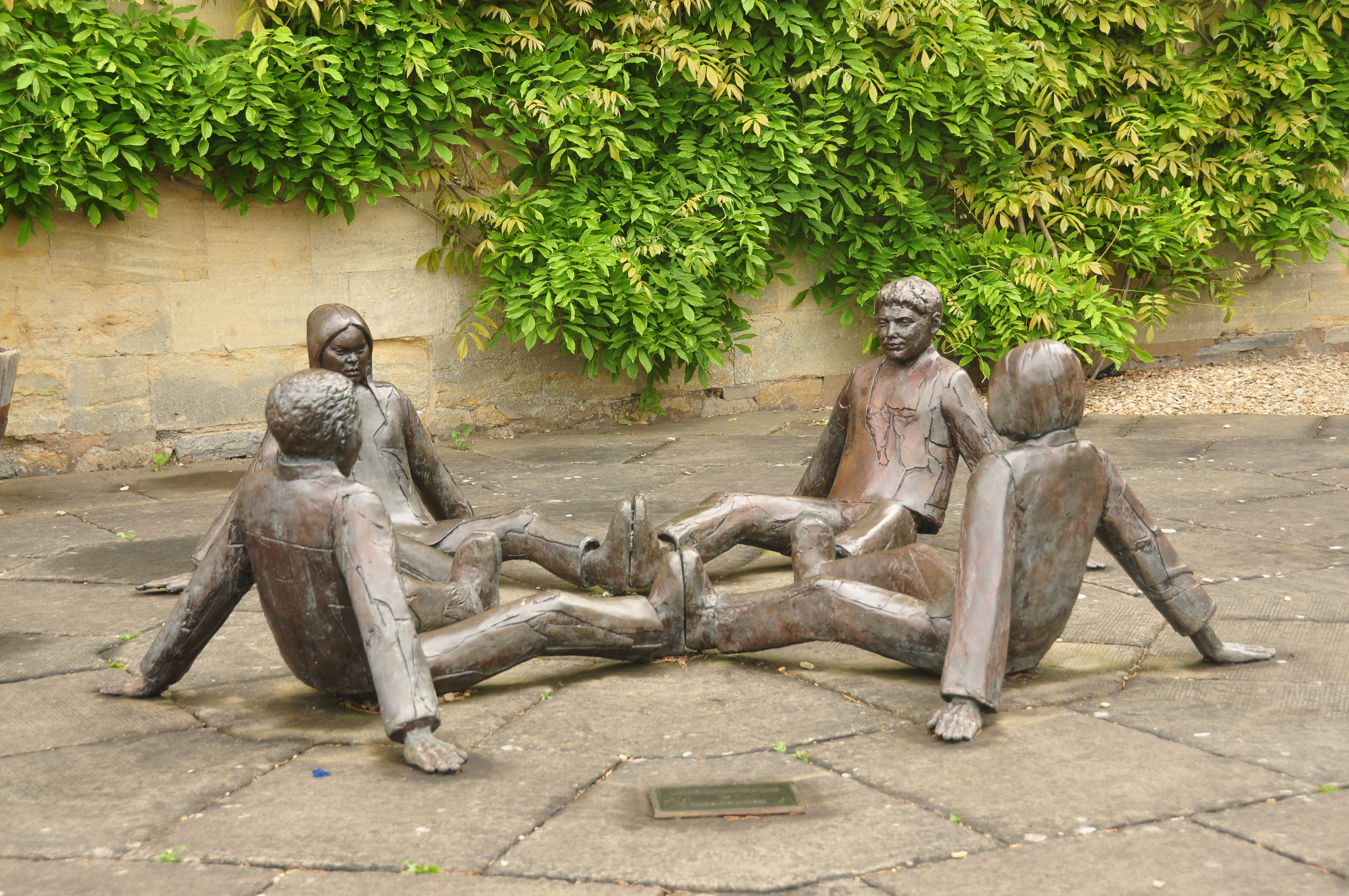
"Touching Souls" at Tewkesbury Abey by Mico Kaufman

His preferred materials include bronze, stainless steel, and plastic. He was a freelance artist for the Medallic Art Company and designed over 300 medals for them, including 192 medals for their American Bicentennial and the Judaic Heritage series.

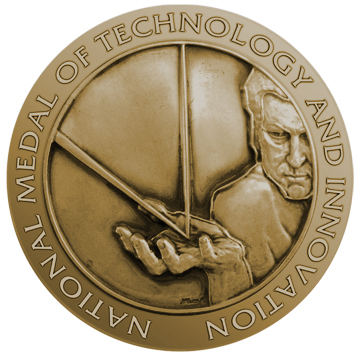
Kaufman's winning design for the National Medal of Technology and Innovation

His design was selected for the National Medal of Technology and Innovation award. He was a member of the Society of Medalists. In January 2016 he published his book A Chiseler's True Story: The Art of Mico Kaufman.

=== Awards ===
- 1978: Sculptor of the year by the American Numismatic Society
- 1992: American Numismatic Society's Saltus Award.
- 2010: James McNeill Whistler House Distinguished Artist Award
- 2011 UMass Lowell honorary doctorate

=== Inaugural Medals ===
At the time of Ronald Reagan's second inauguration, it was noted that Kaufman was the second artist in the history of the series to make this many medals.

- Gerald Ford: vice presidential and presidential
- Ronald Reagan: presidential (second term)
- George H.W. Bush: presidential

=== Public Works and Locations ===
Six of his works are located in Tewksbury and another six are located in Lowell.

- "Wamesit Indian" in Tewksbury, MA (1989)
- "Water" in Tewksbury, MA (1985)
- "Homage to Women” in Lowell, MA(1984)
- "The Muster" in Tewksbury, MA
- "Touching Souls" in Tewkesbury Abbey, UK and Tewksbury, MA
- James McNeil Whistler Memorial in Lowell, MA
- World War II Memorial in Tewksbury, MA
- Blessed Eugene de Mazenod in Tewksbury, MA and Lowell, MA
- The Rouses Memorial in Lowell, MA
- Claude Debussy at UMass Lowell in Lowell, MA
- Italia in Lowell, MA

Upon his death, pieces from his collection were donated to local libraries including Tewksbury Public Library, Middlesex Community College, the Rolling Ridge Retreat and Conference Center in North Andover, MA, and University of Massachusetts Lowell.
