= Alex Shagin =

Russian sculptor

Alex Shagin is a coin designer.

== Artistic overview ==
Shagin, born near Leningrad on 1947, graduated from the Vera Mukhina School of Arts and Design in Leningrad in 1972, and then designed commemorative coins and medallions for the Leningrad Mint. Peter the Great, Michelangelo, Apollo–Soyuz and the Moscow Olympics are but a few of his designs. He emigrated to the United States, and since 1980, has worked as a freelance medallic artist in Southern California.

== Awards ==
- Moscow Medallic Art Award in 1972;
- First prize in the American Medallic Sculptors Association in 1983;
- American Numismatic Association Excellence Award in 1990;
- J. Sanford Saltus Award from the American Numismatic Society in 1995.

He has works in museums and private collections around the world, including the Hermitage Museum, the Smithsonian Institution, Yad Vashem Museum, the British Museum and the Swedish Royal Medallic Collection. In 2002, as First Vice President of the American Medallic Sculpture Association (A.M.S.A.) he participated in the Federation Internationale de le Medaille (F.I.D.E.M.) congress by designing a special presentation medal for the American Delegation—The Medal of Liberty presented to twelve individuals by Ronald Reagan in 1986.

== Organizations and Individuals that have commissioned works from Alex Shagin ==
- National Air and Space Museum
- The Hermitage Museum
- The British Museum Permanent Numismatic Collection
- The Swedish royal family
- The Gorbachev Foundation
- Armand Hammer Museum
- The Jewish-American Hall of Fame
- Governor Arnold Schwarzenegger
- Ronald Reagan Presidential Library

Each project Alex Shagin designs is a personal tribute to the freedom and democracy he found since immigrating to America from Russia in the 1980s. His work on the Moscow Olympics (1980) and Los Angeles Olympics (1984) led to international recognition culminating in the American Numismatic Society's Saltus Award in 1995. He has created works for the US Mint, Singapore Mint, Israel Government Mint, American Numismatic Association, Leningrad Mint, The White House (Ronald Reagan) to name a few.

== Shagin medallic history ==
Shagin's principal work has been uniface and two-sided cast bronze medals. He has also produced freestanding medallic art. The classical tradition is the key to his art.

Yuri Barshay and Thomas F. Fitzgerald, with the assistance of Shagin, compiled the following list of his early works issued by the Leningrad Mint:

- Peter the Great medal, designed in 1972, produced in 1974, right-facing bust; aluminum, 60 millimeters.
- Peter the Great portrait medal, designed in 1972, produced in 1974, three quarters bust; aluminum, 60 millimeters.
- 250th Anniversary of the Founding of the Leningrad Mint, issued in 1974; aluminum and tombac, 88 percent copper, 12 percent zinc), 65 millimeters.
- Heroes of the Baltic Sea, Navy Torpedo Boats, issued in 1974; aluminum, 65 millimeters.
- Heroic Defenders of Leningrad, issued in 1974; aluminum, 65 millimeters.
- Skills and Hard Work, Success of the Five-Year Plan, date 1974; tombac, 65 millimeters.
- Glory to the Peoples' Victory, issued in 1975; aluminum, 65 millimeters.
- 1975 Apollo–Soyuz medal, issued as gifts to the astronauts and cosmonauts who participated in the joint mission; aluminum and bronze, 65 millimeters.
- The Decembrists, dated 1975, commemorating the 150th anniversary of the 1825 attempt to overthrow the czar; aluminum and tombac, 65 millimeters.
- The Decembrists, dated 1989, struck 10 years after Shagin's departure from the Leningrad Mint for an exhibit in Leningrad and Moscow, tombac, 65 millimeters.
- Michelangelo, dated 1976, commemorating the 500th anniversary of Michelangelo's birth; anodized aluminum, 65 mil¬limeters.
- Ernst Thälmann, a German communist who died following his imprisonment by the Nazis from 1934 to 1944, issued in 1976; anodized aluminum, 65 millimeters.
- Peter the Great, issued in 1976; anodized aluminum, 65 millimeters.
- 60th Anniversary of the Revolution, dated 1977; aluminum, 65 millimeters.
- S.P. Koroljev, chief engineer of the Soviet Union's space program, dated 1976; bronze, 65 millimeters.
- A.A Blagonravov, dated 1977, commemorating the 40th anniversary of the Academy of Industrial Machinery, which was responsible for the Soviet Union's military and industrial development. (Blagonravov was director of the Academy); bronze and aluminum, 65 millimeters.
- AA Blagonravov, dated 1987, commemorating the 50th anniversary of the Academy of Industrial Machinery, two different reverses (large numeral 50, or industrial gears and atoms); tombac, 65 millimeters.
- Titian, dated 1977, commemorating the 400th anniversary of the Italian artist's death; aluminum and bronze, 65 millimeters.
- Diego Rivera, Mexican muralist, dated 1977; bronze, 65 millimeters.
- David Alfaro Siqueiros, Mexican muralist, dated 1977; bronze, 65 millimeters.

The following medals and coins are compiled from Coin World archives, with Shagin's favorites listed at the top:

- Israel commemorative medal in gold, silver and bronze, honoring Anne Frank, issued in 1988 by the Israel Government Coin and Medal Corp.; 30-millimeter bronze, 27-millimeter silver and 18-millimeter gold. The obverse features a stylized portrait of Anne with her name below and to the left of the portrait. The reverse features the outline of a hand behind barbed wire and the inscription 1933-1945 REMEMBER HOLOCAUST.
- Obverse of 2005 Shawnee Nation gold $5 piece issued by a private firm.
- Duke Georgii Mikhailovich medal, marking the 140th anniversary of the birth of the famed Russian numismatist, issued in 2002.
- City of David, second medal honoring the 3,000th anniversary of the city of Jerusalem, issued in 1996 as an artist's limited edition and as a tribute to the Holy Land.
- Commemorative medals for the Frederic Remington Art Museum, Ogdensburg, N.Y, from 2003 to 2007.
- J.S. Bach tercentennial medal, issued in 1985, self-standing, 4.5 inches, 1.5 pounds, issued in 1985.

Obverse shows a stylized wig forming a baroque frame in the upper left; reverse design, three musical cherubs in extremely high relief flying above an organ in the upper right; and a side view showing the depth of the sculpturing in the lower left. Mintage was limited to 150 pieces. Medals are hand finished, signed and numbered by the artist.

- American Numismatic Society Trustees Award to numismatic author Q. David Bowers, issued in 2006; silver, uniface portrait medal, with award information engraved on the reverse.
- George Orwell medal, issued in 1984.
- 1988 Brookgreen Gardens medal.

Variation on the subject of mythical and real world was used, combining the theme of the sculptor at work. Represented on the reverse, the artist is shown dreaming of his creations in a sculpture garden of fantasy. The obverse illustrates scenes of the sculptor's workplace: an artist modeling a small figure, enlarging a figure, and workmen casting a sculpture at an art foundry. This medal, executed in low relief, was the first in the series to be pierced. The hole in the meda1 corresponds to the sun warming the garden on the obverse and the mouth of the crucible from which molten bronze is poured on the reverse.

- 1986 "One Planet" medal for the Society of Medalists, issued in 1987. The society's director, Joseph Noble, stated in The Numismatist: "We have all seen dozens of peace medals, mostly with pious mottos and floating allegorical maidens holding aloft a panoply of broken swords and olive branches.

But Shagin chose a new, dramatic approach - that of viewing our world from outer space - and saying visually that "this is the only world we have."

- Ronald Reagan flag-like self-standing bronze medallic sculpture, issued in 1985; 3.5 inches tall and 4 inches wide; wavy, evoking a flying United States flag. It weighs more than a pound. Mintage was limited to 500 pieces.~ 1992 American Numismatic Association Glenn Smedley Memorial bronze award medal.
- Medal for the Arnold Classic bodybuilding competition, first issued in 1989 and awarded each year since for the top finalists.
- American Numismatic Association convention medals for 2006 convention medal, struck at Keystone Mint; obverse design of the Denver Mint, with the Colorado state flower, the columbine.

The reverse design shows aspen and evergreen trees. Both sides incorporate the Rocky Mountains. Shagin has also designed medals for the 2005 and 1997 ANA convention medals.

- Medal of Pietro Aretino, 450th anniversary of death, dated 2006, struck in bronze.
- Reverses of 15 coins for the Bahamas, commemorating "500 Years of the Discovery of the Americas," dated 1990, 1991 and 1992.
- Space commemorative medals issued by a private company from 1999 to 2005, including a silver medal honoring the Columbia shuttle crew.
- 50th anniversary silver medal of Corvette, authorized by General Motors, issued in 2003.
- Lunar calendar medals issued by a private firm in 1993 and 1994.
- Reverse of Cook Islands $10 coin commemorating the 125th anniversary of Yellowstone National Park, issued in 1996. ~ Martin Luther King medal for the Society for King Coinage, issued in 1987.
- Meriwether Lewis and William Clark medals for the California Numismatic Association, issued in 2005.
- Medals for the 500th anniversary in 1992 of the discovery of America by Christopher Columbus, approved by the Christopher Columbus Quincentenary Jubilee Commission; established by an act of Congress; struck and marketed by American Founders Mint.
- 2007 NASA HST Discovery Coin Series featuring 10 individual designs struck in high relief depicting the sun and planets celebrating the discoveries of the Hubble Telescope. Represented on the reverse is a quote from Hubble, the official NASA meatball logo and highly stylized and detailed image of the Hubble telescope in a mirrored star field. Limited editions of each of these commemorative coins were produced, and the dies are destroyed.
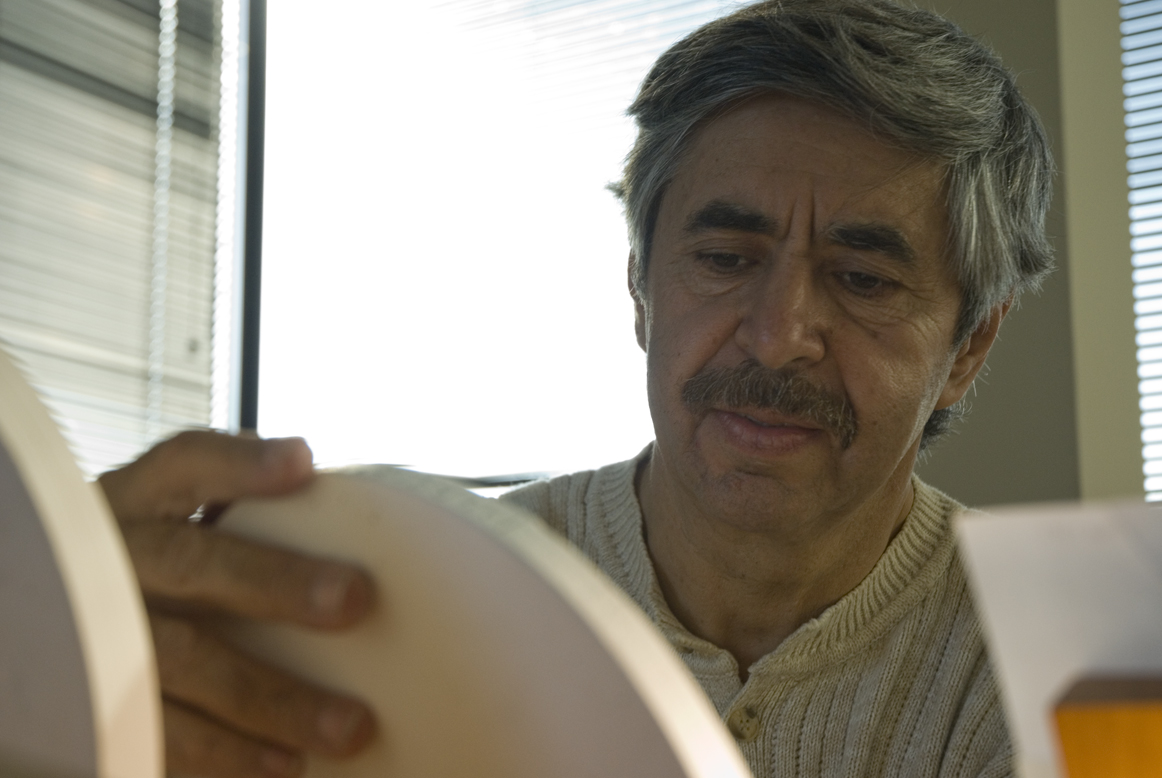
Shagin at work on NASA Discovery Coin Series

Etching detail on HST Discovery die plate
