= Abram Belskie =

American sculptor

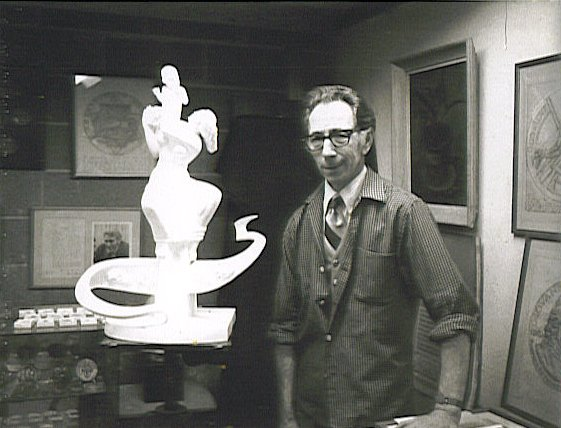
- Abram Belskie
- Born: Abraham Belskie; March 24, 1907; London, England
- Died: November 7, 1988 (aged 81)
- Occupation: Sculptor

Abram Belskie (March 24, 1907 – November 7, 1988) was a British-born sculptor who did his best-known work in the US. He is known for his 1939 collaboration with Robert Latou Dickinson on the Dickinson-Belskie Birth Series Sculptures.

== Biography ==
Belskie was born in London to Russian Jewish immigrants, and grew up in Glasgow, Scotland. He graduated from the Glasgow School of Art in 1926. In 1929 he emigrated to New York City, to work for British sculptor John Gregory, as well as sculptor Malvina Hoffman.

In 1938, Hoffman recommended Belskie to physician Robert Latou Dickinson. They immediately collaborated to create medical models which were exhibited at the New York World's Fair of 1939. These sculptures became known as the Dickinson-Belskie Birth Series, which became popular at the fair, and were soon reproduced for display worldwide. For the next decade, this collaboration would produce over a hundred other detailed medical models, ended only by the death of Dickinson.

In 1942, Belskie created two life-sized sculptures, Norma and Normman, based on data collected by Dickinson, and intended to represent the statistical ideal female and male figure. After Dickinson's death in 1950, Belskie turned to creating medallions, some of which were medicine-related.

Belskie died in 1988. In 1993, the Belskie Museum of Arts and Science was opened in Closter, New Jersey. It was founded by the Closter Lions Club to preserve, house and exhibit the works of Abram Belskie. The museum was entirely funded by membership fees, donations, grants, and local subsidies.

== Memberships ==
- National Sculpture Society, fellow
- National Academy of Design, fellow
- The American Numismatic Society, fellow
- Allied Artists of America.

== Awards ==
- John Keppie Traveling Scholarship, Scotland, 1926;
- Sir John Edward Burnett Prize, Scotland, 1928;
- Lindsay Morris Memorial Award, 1951;
- J. Sanford Saltus Medal, American Numismatic Society, 1959:
- Mrs. Louis Bennett Award, 1956; Golden Anniversary Prize, Allied Artists of America, 1963

== Collections ==
In addition to private collections, Belskie's work is exhibited at:

- American Museum of Natural History, New York
- The Field Museum, Chicago, Illinois
- Mariner's Museum, Newport News, Virginia
- Brookgreen Gardens, Pawley Island, South Carolina
- Cleveland Health Museum, Cleveland, OH;
- Johnson & Johnson, New Brunswick, New Jersey.
- Jewish Theological Seminary, New York
- Park Avenue Synagogue, New York
- New York Academy of Medicine, New York
- The Belskie Museum, Closter, New Jersey
- Warren Anatomical Museum at Harvard Medical School
