= Eugene Daub =

American contemporary figure sculptor

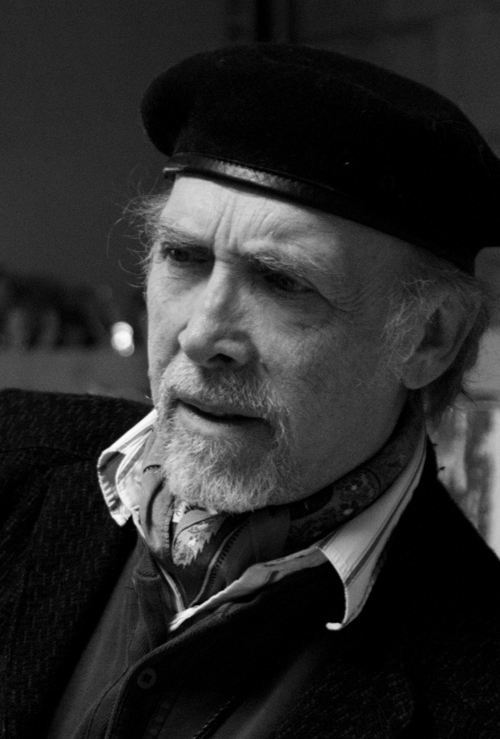
Sculptor Eugene Daub

Eugene Daub (born November 13, 1942) is an American contemporary figure sculptor, best known for his portraits and figurative monument sculpture created in the classic heroic style. His sculptures reside in three United States state capitals and in the National Statuary Hall of the United States Capitol. His work also appears as public monuments, public art, and other permanent collections throughout the United States and Europe.

== Early life and education ==
Eugene Daub was born in Pottstown, Pennsylvania. He attended Pennsylvania Academy of the Fine Arts, Philadelphia; The Johnson Atelier Technical Institute of Sculpture, New Jersey; Rutgers University, New Jersey; and the Academy of Art College, San Francisco.

== Personal life ==
Eugene Daub is married to artist Anne Daub.

== Career ==
Eugene Daub began his career as an art director for an advertising firm. His first job in sculpture was for The Franklin Mint where he developed skills in relief sculpture.

He taught at the Academy of Art University in San Francisco from 1993 to 2007, and he has been an instructor at the Scottsdale Artists’ School since 1991.

Daub has exhibited extensively and has works in numerous public collections, including the Helsinki Art Museum, the British Museum; the Smithsonian Institution; The National Statuary Hall Collection in the United States Capitol and the United States National Park Service.

Daub has created over 40 major monuments in the U.S. in the last 30 years.

Daub is a Fellow of the National Sculpture Society.

Between 2004 and 2013, Daub joined sculptor Rob Firmin to form Daub & Firmin Sculpture Studios, LLC, where Daub served as master artist and principal sculptor, and Firmin served as designer, sculptor, historian, and proposal creator.

== Artworks ==
=== Rosa Parks statue ===
In December 2009, the firm of Daub and Firmin won the design competition to create a statue of Rosa Parks for the U.S. Capitol. The full title of the statue was initially Rosa Parks: The Spark that Ignited the Modern Civil Rights Movement, and was subsequently updated to Rosa Parks: Taking Her Seat in History. Eugene Daub was the principal sculptor, and collaborated with partner Rob Firmin on the concept and pedestal for the statue, which was unveiled in 2013. The statue of Rosa Parks is historically significant as being the first full-length statue of an African American person in the U.S. Capitol. It is also the first statue commissioned by the Congress since 1873.

=== Public Art ===
Partial Portfolio

- Experience the Beauty, with Anne Olsen Daub. Station art installation, San Dimas, California, 2025.
- Poetry and Politics, Lewis McAdams Monument. Los Angeles, California, 2018.
- The Benchmark for Excellence. Santa Monica, California, 2017.
- Henry W. and Marion Bloch Memorial, University of Missouri, Kansas City, 2013.
- Rosa Parks, Taking Her Seat in History, with Rob Firmin. Statue of Rosa Parks, National Statuary Hall, U.S. Capitol, 2013.
- Founders Monument, with Anne Olsen Daub. Heritage Springs Sculpture Park, Santa Fe Springs, California, 2013.
- Port Police. San Pedro, California, 2013.
- Allegories of Civilization, or The Great Utahs. Utah State Capitol, Salt Lake City, Utah, 2013.
- Harry Bridges Memorial. San Pedro, California, 2009.
- A National Salute to Bob Hope and the Miliary, with Steven Whyte. San Diego, California, 2008.
- Lincoln As A Boy, sculpture of Abraham Lincoln. Hodgenville, Kentucky, 2008.
- Harvey Milk, statue of Harvey Milk. San Francisco City Hall, San Francisco, California, 2008.
- USS San Diego Memorial, with Louis Quaintance. San Diego, 2008.
- Monument to General Bernard Adolph Schriever, Los Angeles Air Force Base, Los Angeles, California, 2007.
- Phineas Banning Memorial, statue of Phineas Banning, Wilmington, Los Angeles, California, 2004.
- Corps of Discovery, sculpture installation commemorating Lewis and Clark, Kansas City, Missouri, 2000.
- Thomas Jefferson, statue of Thomas Jefferson (based on events of a specific day as described in an unpublished history dissertation). University of Virginia, Charlottesville, Virginia

=== Numismatic work ===
Eugene Daub's involvement with the American Medallic Sculpture Association (AMSA) brought contemporary American medallic art into an international movement. He is one of its pioneering members, serving as its Vice President and Past President.

Daub is the first sculptor since Daniel Chester French in 1919 to have sculpted more than one medal for the American Numismatic Society. He won both of the nation's highest awards for excellence in medallic art: the Saltus Award from the American Numismatic Society, and the gold medal from the American Numismatic Association. He is the designer of the first Philadelphia Liberty Medal awarded every year to a champion of world peace.

==== Notable medals ====
- Statue of Liberty Medal, American Numismatic Society 1986
- Philadelphia Liberty Medal, 1986
- Helsinki delegation medal, FIDEM convention 1991
- Crazy Horse, first issued medal of the American Medallic Sculpture Association, 1987
- Fire and Ice, #121 medal of the Society of Medalist, 1992
- Discovery Medal, Brookgreen Sculpture Gardens, 1993
- Wildwood Medal, Little Rock Arkansas, 1988
- Kavli Prize Medallion, 2009
- Lewis and Clark, Montana Historical Society, 2006
- 100th Anniversary Medal, New York Numismatic Club, 2008
- Ruth Bader Ginsburg medallion, Jewish American Hall of Fame, 2012
- Ratification Medal, United States Capital Historical Society, 1988

== Publications ==
A biography of Eugene Daub was published in 2025. Eugene Daub: Portraits, Medals and Monuments, edited by Andrea Serna and co-written by Rosa Lowinger, Ron Linden, Wolfgang Mabry, and George S. Cuhaj, contains over 200 images of his work over a 50 year career.

== Awards ==
- Saltus Award1991. The Saltus Awardis the highest national and international recognition of the American Numismatic Society for excellence in medallic sculpture.
- Gold medal, from the American Numismatic Association for lifetime achievement in Medallic Sculpture.
- He is a Fellow of the National Sculpture Society.
- Daub was awarded the Arthur Ross Award in 2002 by the Institute of Classical Architecture and Art.
- Best Historical Sculpture award, Oakland Museum of California, California Arts Club, 2006
- Best in Show Sculpture, Fallbrook Art Center, 2008
- Elliot Gantz Foundry Award, Portrait Sculpture, 79th annual NSS exhibition, 2012
- Agop Agopoff Memorial Prize, 2013
- In September 2012 Daub was awarded an Honorary Doctorate of Human Letters from the Academy of Art University, San Francisco.
- Medal of Honor, National Sculpture Society, 2014. The Medal of Honor is the society's highest award, presented for notable achievement in and for the encouragement of American sculpture.
