= Kenneth W. Harl =

American numismatist

- Education: Yale University (PhD & M.A.) Trinity College (B.A.)
- Occupation(s): Professor of History at Tulane University; Author
- Notable work: Empires of the Steppes: The Nomadic Tribes Who Shaped Civilisation; The Vikings Rome and the Barbarians; Great Ancient Civilizations of Asia Minor; Civic Coins and Civic Politics in the Roman East, A.D. 180-275 Coinage in the Roman Economy
- Awards: Sheldon H. Hackney Award Tulane's annual Student Body Award for Excellence in Teaching (x9) Baylor University's nationwide Robert Foster Cherry Award for Great Teachers

Kenneth W. Harl is an American scholar, author, and classicist. He received his B.A. in Classics and History at Trinity College, and his M.A. and PhD at Yale University. He was a professor of history at Tulane University in New Orleans until his retirement in 2022.

Harl is known for his expertise in ancient numismatics, especially on the provincial and civic coinages of the Roman East. He was the visiting professor for the summer seminar of the American Numismatic Society in 2001, and is currently a fellow and trustee of the society. Additionally, Harl was the Lewis P. Jones Visiting Professor in History at Wofford College. He taught and published on Greek, Roman, Byzantine, Viking, Crusader, and military history.

Harl is most noted for his outstanding teaching, having received many awards voted him by the Tulane student body, as well as receiving the national David Cherry Award in Excellence in Teaching from Baylor University, and an honorary B.A. from Tulane University for forty years of teaching and advising in 2017. Eleven of his courses have been produced by the Great Courses Teaching Company.

Harl has worked at the excavations of Metropolis and Gordion in Turkey.

== Career ==
=== Writer ===
Harl has written numerous books throughout his scholarly life, starting off with Civic Coins and Civic Politics in the Roman East, A.D. 180-275 in 1987. He would go on to write many other books including: Coinage in the Roman Economy, 300 B.C. to A.D. 700 (1996), The World of Byzantium (2001), Great Ancient Civilizations of Asia Minor (2001), The Era of the Crusades (2003), Rome and the Barbarians (2004), Origins of Great Ancient Civilizations (2005), The Vikings (2005), The Peloponnesian War (2007), Alexander the Great and the Macedonian Empire (2010), The Fall of the Pagans and the Origins of Medieval Christianity (2011), The Barbarian Empires of the Steppes (2013), The Ottoman Empire (2017), and most recently Empires of the Steppes: The Nomadic Tribes Who Shaped Civilisation (2023). Harl has contributed to many books including: Essays on Politics, War, and History in Ancient Greece (1997) by Peter Krentz, Macedonian Legacies: Studies in Ancient Macedonian History and Culture (2008) by Jeanne Reames and Timothy Howe, The Oxford Handbook of Ancient Anatolia, 10,000-323 B.C.E. (2011) by Gregory McMahon and Sharon Steadman, and Mercury's Wings: Exploring Modes of Communication in the Ancient World (2017) by F S. Naiden and Richard J. A. Talbert.

=== Professor ===
Harl worked for over forty years as a Professor of Classical and Byzantine History at Tulane University in New Orleans. At the university, he taught courses in Roman, Greek, Byzantine, Viking, and Crusader history.

=== The Great Courses ===
Harl has created many courses for The Great Courses, which teach about historical events and time periods. He is one of the top teachers on the platform, helping many students gain a better grasp on history.

=== Archeological and educational tours ===
Harl has taken his students on field expeditions to view and assist in excavations. One instance of this is when he took his students to assist in the excavations of Roman and Hellenistic sites in Turkey.

=== Awards ===
Harl has received many teaching awards at Tulane, including the Sheldon H. Hackney Award and Tulane's annual Student Body Award for Excellence in Teaching nine times. Additionally, Harl is the recipient of Baylor University's nationwide Robert Foster Cherry Award for Great Teachers.

== Works ==
=== Books ===
==== Author ====
- Harl, Kenneth W. Empires of the Steppes: A History of the Nomadic Tribes Who Shaped Civilization, 2023.
- Harl, Kenneth W. The Ottoman Empire, 2017.
- Harl, Kenneth W. The Barbarian Empires of the Steppes, 2013.
- Harl, Kenneth W. The Fall of the Pagans and the Origins of Medieval Christianity, 2011.
- Harl, Kenneth W. Alexander the Great and the Macedonian Empire, 2010.
- Harl, Kenneth W. The Peloponnesian War, 2007.
- Harl, Kenneth W. The Vikings, 2005.
- Harl, Kenneth W. Origins of Great Ancient Civilizations, 2005.
- Harl, Kenneth W. Rome and the Barbarians, 2004.
- Harl, Kenneth W. The Era of the Crusades, 2003.
- Harl, Kenneth W. Great Ancient Civilizations of Asia Minor, 2001.
- Harl, Kenneth W. The World of Byzantium, 2001.
- Harl, Kenneth W. Coinage in the Roman Economy, 300 B.C. to A.D. 700, 1996.
- Harl, Kenneth W. Civic Coins and Civic Politics in the Roman East, A.D. 180-275, 1987.

==== Contributor ====
- Naiden, F. S. and Richard J. A. Talbert. Mercury's Wings: Exploring Modes of Communication in the Ancient World, 2017.
- McMahon, Gregory and Sharon Steadman. The Oxford Handbook of Ancient Anatolia, 10,000-323 B.C.E., 2011.
- Reames, Jeanne and Timothy Howe. Macedonian Legacies: Studies in Ancient Macedonian History and Culture, 2008.
- Krentz, Peter. Polis and Polemos : Essays on Politics, War, and History in Ancient Greece, 1997.
