= Granville Carter =

American sculptor (1920–1992)

Granville Wellington Carter NA, Fellow National Sculpture Society (November 18, 1920 – November 21, 1992) was an American sculptor.

He started his sculpture career by taking up wood carving as a teenager. Many of his wood carved creations would be signed "Dany", as he was known by family and friends. His fine wood carvings gained him praise and coverage in local newspapers such as the "Portland Sunday Telegram"., and the "Lewistion Journal". Carter was featured the 1949 book "Handicrafts of New England," by Allen H. Eaton.

Dany Carter was a prolific whittler of figures and animals. All were executed in his wood of choice - white pine. He also crafted several dioramas, some were scenes from Disney's "Snow White and the Seven Dwarfs (1937 film)," and "Pinocchio." Other dioramas included practical lighting effects incorporated into the settings giving them their own dramatic lighting effects.

One of his largest carvings titled "Under the Wire," can be viewed at the "Harness Racing Museum & Hall of Fame", Goshen, New York. The diorama was donated in 1972 by noted businessman and philanthropist, Louis Resnick. The 4 ft wood harness racing diorama depicts a harrowing scene where a driver is thrown from his sulky, as three trailing sulkies are bearing down on the displaced driver.

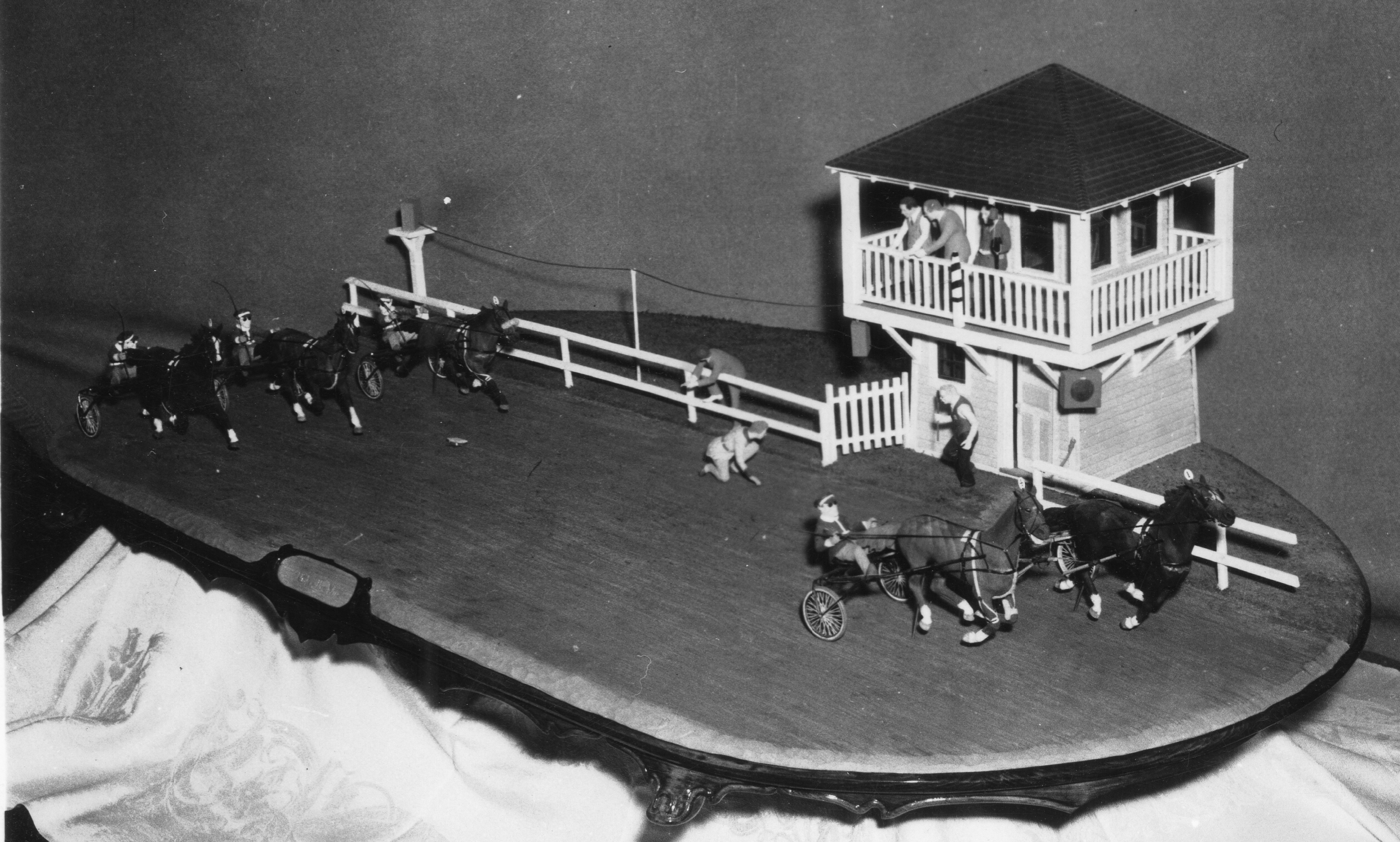
"UNDER THE WIRE". Woodcarving signed "Dany" aka: Granville Carter

== Biography ==
He was born on November 18, 1920, in Augusta, Maine.

His formal art training began in 1944 under Alexander Bower at the Portland School for Fine and Applied Art. This was followed by four more years of studying under John Flanagan in New York City.

He married Senta Jacobshagen, a painter and commercial artist who produced illuminated manuscripts. They had a daughter Juliana Carter, and a son, Richard Carter.

In 1954 he received two Tiffany Fellowships which allowed to further his studies in Paris and Rome. There he attended the Academie de la Grande Chaumiere and the "Scuolo del Circolare Internazionale di Roma" and was in residence for one year (1954–1955) at the American Academy in Rome.

He died of lung cancer in Baldwin, Nassau County, New York, on November 21, 1992, at the age of 72. He was interred at the George Washington Memorial Park in Paramus, New Jersey.

== Art training ==
Carter worked as an assistant for Herbert Haseltine and over a ten-year span assisted him on three equestrian statues, Man o' War in Lexington, Kentucky, Sir John Dill on Arlington National Cemetery and George Washington at the National Cathedral. For short periods of time he also assisted the distinguished sculptors Bryant Baker, Joseph Kiselewski and Sidney Waugh.

== Professional memberships ==
Academician, National Academy of Design 1960; Fellow, National Sculpture Society; Fellow, American Artists Professional League; Life Fellow, American Numismatic Society; member, Council of American Artist Societies, National Register of Prominent Americans and International Notables.

Carter was a member of the National Sculpture Society since 1956, and eventually elected a Fellow, held numerous positions at the Sculpture Society, including:

- Director (1960–1962)
- Recording Secretary (1963–1965)
- Director (1966–1978)
- Editorial Board (1974–1976)
- President of the Sculpture Society (1979–1982)

== Awards ==
- Carter received some important recognition during his lifetime including the Henry Hering Memorial Medal, in 1968 for his work at the National Cathedral and the Saltus Award Winner, in 1975, from the American Numismatic Society whereupon he became a Life Fellow of the Society.
- Lindsey Morris Memorial Award from the National Sculpture Society in 1966.
- Gold Medal - Grand National Lever House from the American Artists Professional League, (AAPL) in 1970. www.americanartistsprofessionalleague.org
- Gold Medal - Union Carbide, 50th Anniversary Exhibition of the American *Artists Professional League, in 1978. www.americanartistsprofessionalleague.org
- The Dessie Greer Portrait Prize from the National Academy of Design in 1980.
- The Therese & Edward H. Richard Memorial Prize in 1980.

G.W. Carter was an Instructor at the National *Academy School of Fine Arts in NYC from 1967 through the 1980s.

- Carter's sculptural works ranged from monuments to medals. A partial list is as follows:

== Medals ==
- Street and Smith Publications medal
- American Institute of Geonomy & Natural Resources Medal
- Pilgrim Society Gold Medal for Sir Winston Churchill
- American Welding Society Davis Silver Medal
- American Institute of Chemical Engineers Medal
- Washington Cathedral Tower Dedication Medal
- American Canadian Centenary of Friendship medal
- Official Maine Sesquicentennial Medal (1970)
- General Casimir Pulaski Monument dedication Medal (1976)
- Francis Marion Medal for Brookgreen Gardens, South Carolina
- George Washington, James Fenimore Cooper, Thomas Alva Edison, Stonewall Jackson and Jane Addams for the Hall of Fame for Great Americans at New York University.

== Plaques ==
- American Institute Of Chemical Engineers
- Thomas Edison National Historical Park
- Coach John Heisman Tablet for Georgia Institute Of Technology

== Statuary ==
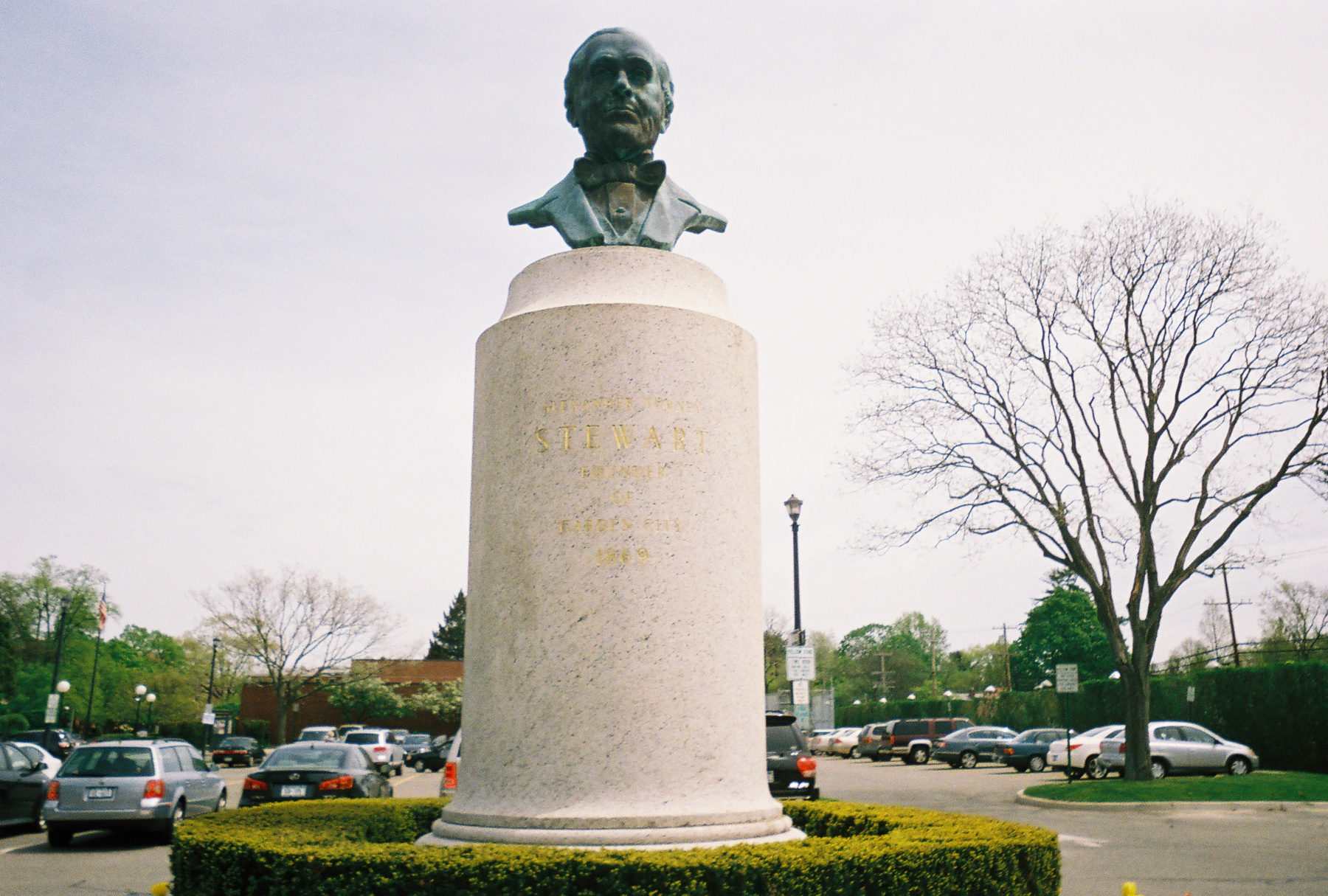
Garden City Station - Stewart Statue

West Texas Pioneer Family, Lubbock Texas. Dedicated: June, 1971

General Casimir Pulaski Monument, Hartford, Connecticut. Dedicated: July 4, 1976

- Two heroic size limestone Archangels of Saint Michael and Saint Gabriel located at the south transept of the Washington National Cathedral, Washington, DC.
- Saint Augustine Of Canterbury, outer bay figure inside the Washington National Cathedral
- 31 Limestone Clerestory Bosses located inside the Washington National Cathedral.
- 1/3 over life size bust of Jane Addams for The Hall of Fame for Great Americans at New York University. Currently part of Bronx Community College, Bronx NY.
- Monumental portrait bust of Alexander Turney Stewart, for Garden City, NY
- Heroic sized bronze group "West Texas Pioneer Family" for Lubbock, Texas (1971).
- Heroic sized equestrian "General Casimir Pulaski" for Hartford, CT (1976).
- Heroic sized bust of aviator "Charles A. Lindbergh" for the Garden City Historical Society, Garden City, NY (1977).
- Heroic sized bust of General Chiang Kai-shek for Chiang Kai-shek Memorial Hall, Taipei, Taiwan (1980).
- Busts of real estate tycoon Harry Helmsley and Leona Helmsley.
- George Washington Kneeling in Prayer (1991), George Washington Memorial Park, Paramus, New Jersey. A copy of Donald De Lue's 1967 statue at Valley Forge, Pennsylvania. De Lue died in 1988, and Carter completed the commission.
