= Margaret Spicer-Simson =

American artist

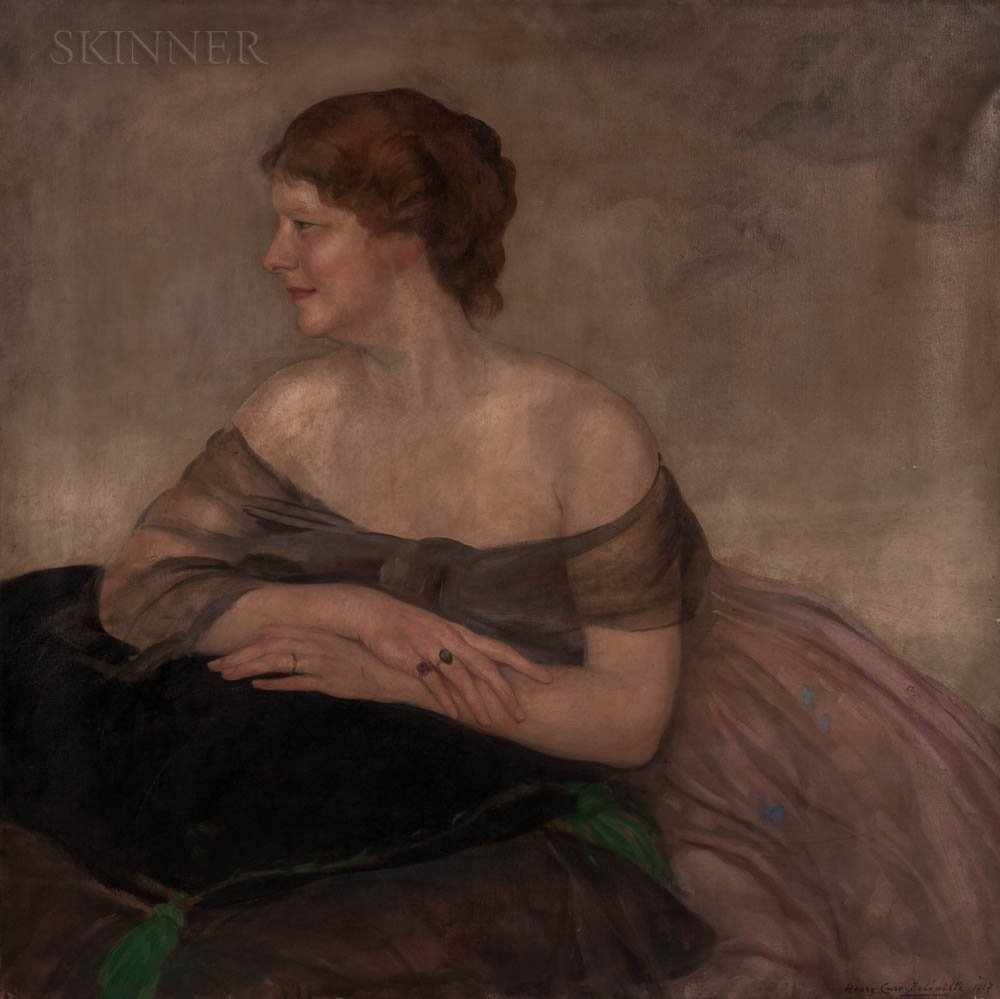
- portrait by Henry Caro Delvaille
- Born: Margaret Schmidt; March 6, 1874; Washington, D.C., US
- Died: April 5, 1968 (aged 94); Miami, Florida, US
- Occupation(s): Artist, miniaturist
- Spouse: Theodore Spicer-Simson

Margaret Spicer-Simson (6 March 1874 – 5 April 1968) was an American artist and painter of miniatures.

== Life ==
Margaret Schmidt was born in Washington, D.C. in 1874, the daughter of Ernest L. Schmidt and Christina Gudenrath.

She studied in Europe with Ludwig Knaus, Louis M. Boutet de Monvel and Eugene Carriere and married fellow artist Theodore Spicer-Simson in Washington on 1 July 1896. During the Spanish American War, in 1899, the couple moved to Paris. There, they lived in Montparnasse, where they associated with many artists and literary figures. A number of these became subjects of their later works. They were close friends with John and Ada Galsworthy.

In 1900, The Evening Post described Spicer-Simson as one whose "home is in Washington, whose studio is in Paris, and who paints mostly in London". She exhibited at the Paris Salon and in London between 1899 and 1907, including at the Royal Academy of Arts in 1901, from 1 Gayton Crescent, Hampstead.

In 1923, Spicer-Simson was the recipient of a MacDowell fellowship, working in the Adams studio.

In 1924, the Spicer-Simsons moved to Miami, Florida, where they built a home at 3803 Little Avenue in Coconut Grove. Margaret died on 5 April 1968.
