= Albino Manca =

Italian sculptor and medalist (1897–1976)

Albino Manca (Tertenia, December 31, 1897 – New York City, January 15, 1976) was an Italian sculptor and Medalist who became a naturalized United States citizen.

His career, divided between Italy and the United States, ranged from monumental and portrait sculpture to medal making and Goldsmith, reaching the peak of his fame with the bronze eagle of the East Coast Memorial in Battery Park, New York.

== Biography ==
=== Italian Period ===
Born in Tertenia to Vincenzo Manca and Severina Melis, the second of eight children, he left school early to help his family. His inclination for art, which manifested at a young age, found a first, unusual field of application during World War I: assigned to the Military Engineers (Genio militare), he practiced by embossing grenade shell casings.

Once the conflict ended, he worked briefly in the workshop of a funerary sculptor in Cagliari before moving to Rome in 1919. In the capital, he collaborated with Carlo Fontana on the creation of the Quadriga dell'Unità (Quadriga of Unity) for the Victor Emmanuel II Monument. This work allowed him to finance his studies at the Academy of Fine Arts, graduating in 1924 under the guidance of Ettore Ferrari, Angelo Zanelli, and Pietro Canonica. In the same year, he created Studio di nudo (Nude Study), a large-scale male bust.

He officially debuted in Cagliari in 1921, at the Exhibition of the Catholic University Circle, where he successfully presented his first autonomous sculptures, L'abbandono (The Abandonment) and Clelia. Two years later, he created the bronze plaque La Sacrificata (The Sacrificed Woman) for the fallen of his native Tertenia, along with the plaster L'Eroe (The Hero) and a sketch for the Monument to the Fallen of Tortolì, which was never built.

After receiving his diploma in 1924 and completing a year of specialization with Pietro Canonica, his career developed along two parallel tracks: private commissions from high Roman society and public commissions from the Fascist regime. In 1925, he created Il Condottiero (The Leader) and participated in October in Rome in the competition for the Monument to the Fallen Financiers of World War I. The following year, by then under the patronage of the Counts Leopardi, he participated in the XCII Exhibition of the Society of Amateurs and Cultivators of Fine Arts in Rome with Cuffietta Sarda (Sardinian Bonnet), in the Sardinian Hall set up by Melkiorre Melis. Also in 1926, he created a commemorative plaque for the failed assassination attempt on Mussolini by Tito Zaniboni, placed at Chigi Palace, and donated to the Duce a small effigy of Saint Francis created for the seventh centenary of the Saint's death.

Between 1927 and 1928, the National Combatants Association (Associazione Nazionale Combattenti) donated his work Il Condottiero to Mussolini, an occasion on which Manca was received in Rome. He participated in two prize competitions at the Accademia di San Luca with a Monument to the Financier and a Flagellation of Christ, further refining his skills with masters such as Carlo Fontana, Ermenegildo Luppi, and Pietro Canonica. He also executed portraits for the elite, such as that of Anne Marie d'Orléans in her wedding dress. He also exhibited in Cagliari in 1928 at the Caldanzano exhibition and prepared a sketch for a monument to the fallen of Cagliari, which was never realized.

Between 1929 and 1930, he created a marble Redentore (Redeemer) for the International Exposition in Barcelona, while his Statue of the Province of Nuoro, intended for the Stadio dei Marmi at the Foro Mussolini in Rome, was discarded.

=== First American Period ===
Recognition of his talent crossed national borders when Giulio Gatti-Casazza, then director of the Metropolitan Opera House (39th Street) in New York City, invited him to move to the United States, but due to the limited number of visas, his departure was postponed. In 1930, after participating in the I Sardinian Syndical Exhibition in Sassari and having obtained a visa, he went to New York City, where Gatti-Casazza introduced him to high society and procured commissions for him, including a bust of George Washington. He began working in various artistic sectors, specializing in the representation of the natural world and animals in particular.

To this period dates the Pantera (Panther), inspired by the bronze Chimera of Arezzo. Relations with the patron soon wore out when, due to an unpaid sculpture, Albino filed a lawsuit against his patron, which he later lost in 1945. He requested an extension of his residence permit without success and, unable to renew it, Manca returned to Rome in 1932.

=== Last Return to Italy ===
Upon returning to Rome, he dedicated himself to preparing a solo exhibition to be shown in New York City and, inspired by the American sculptor Paul Manship, began the production of small decorative sculptures. His activity for the regime intensified: he created on commission a second bust of the Duce in multiple copies, won the competition for the sculptures of the Palace of the Legion of Carabinieri in Cagliari (1932), and participated in the first phase of the competition for the monument to the Duke of Aosta in Turin.

In the following years, he created a lunette for a funerary monument at the Verano (1933) and participated in the Queen's Competition (Concorso della Regina), held in memory of World War I. In 1934, in his studio on Via Margutta in Rome, he created another bust of Mussolini donated to the Gallery of Modern Art of Littoria (today Latina) ; a copy of the work was purchased by the undersecretary of the interior, Guido Buffarini Guidi.

In 1935, the podestà (mayor) of Castagneto Carducci commissioned a bust of Giosuè Carducci for the centenary of the poet's birth. In the same year, Manca obtained significant national artistic recognition by exhibiting the sculpture Fanciulla dormiente (Sleeping Maiden) at the II Quadriennale of Rome.

On June 13, 1936, he married Tullia de Nicola. In the same year, parallel to his activity as a freelance sculptor, he served for a few months as an appointee for Ornamental Drawing at the Liceo Artistico (Art High School) in Rome. In that fertile period, he created an equestrian portrait of the Duce, the first idea for Il Duce che brandisce la Spada dell'Islam (The Duce Brandishing the Sword of Islam), and the animalier sculpture Gazzella e fico d'India (Gazelle and Prickly Pear). He met Pietro Antonio Manca, a Sardinian artist residing in Rome, and created other animal sculptures such as Tigre (Tiger) in bronze.

In 1938, he presented the plaque Gli artefici dell'Impero (The Artisans of the Empire) to the King and the Duce. In the same year, Gazzella e fico d'India won first prize in the section dedicated to animals at the Exhibition of the Fascist Syndicate of Fine Arts of Lazio, where he also exhibited two Cervi (Deers). He also donated the bronze Il Duce che brandisce la spada dell'Islam to Mussolini.

However, in 1938 his wife Tullia was deprived of her job at the Roman headquarters of Metro-Goldwyn-Mayer Home Entertainment, due to protectionist laws regarding cinema and limitations on female employment. Also disappointed by the failure to be assigned a professorship at the Art High School in Rome , after the birth of his son Vincenzo, Manca left Italy permanently with his family in December 1938, with travel expenses covered by the Italian government and a recommendation from the Italian ambassador in Washington, D.C.. He would never return to Italy.

=== Second American Period ===
Having emigrated permanently in December 1938, Manca initially had to face difficulties integrating into the competitive New York art world, but he soon managed to make himself appreciated. He participated in major exhibitions such as the 1939 New York World's Fair, where he exhibited Gazzella e fico d'India in the Italian Pavilion, and held a solo exhibition in the Italian Line Salon at Rockefeller Center in 1940, presented by his master Angelo Zanelli who defined him as "an instinctive sculptor of animals, [who] possesses the great virtue of discovering the divine side in living nature". During that same period, he moved to East Orange, New Jersey.

The first American recognitions arrived in 1941 with awards from the Montclair Art Museum and the American Artists Professional League, as well as an exhibition at The Newark Museum of Art. The following year, under the guidance of Alphonse La Paglia, he dedicated himself to Goldsmithing, an activity he continued until the sixties. In the same year, 1942, he created the relief Wild Duck and Deer for the Post Office in Lyons, Ohio, as part of the New Deal's Federal Art Project, and the sculpture Venere Americana (American Venus).

In 1943, he was elected a member of the Allied Artists of America and won the Julia S. Kahn Memorial Award for Fanciulla dormiente. He obtained American citizenship in 1944 and, having returned to New York City the following year, he purchased the studio in Greenwich Village that had belonged to the sculptor Herbert Adams (sculptor). His family joined him permanently in 1947, the year in which he created two portraits of Franklin Delano Roosevelt. Probably in this period (or in the two-year period 1952–53) he created the relief cycle La Grande Contesa (The Great Contest).

In 1950, he obtained the Award of the Allied Artists of America, became a member of the National Sculpture Society and a copy of Gazzella e fico d'India was purchased by Brookgreen Gardens in South Carolina. Three years later, in 1953, he executed a commemorative medal for his father, officially launching medal making as one of his most successful activities.

A sensational gesture occurred in 1955, when he clandestinely had a plaster nude of the Turkish dancer Nejla Ateş placed in Central Park, causing a scandal covered by Life magazine.

The culmination of his public career came in 1956, when architects Gehron & Seltzer, winners of the competition for the East Coast Memorial in Battery Park, called upon him to create the large central eagle, the Diving Eagle. The model was completed in 1961 and the work was inaugurated by President John Fitzgerald Kennedy on May 23, 1963. For this work, he received the Henry Hering Memorial Medal in 1972.

In parallel, he founded Contemporary Commemorative Medals Inc. (1960) and his production of medals obtained prestigious commissions, such as that for Pope Paul VI's visit to New York City (1965) and for the Smithsonian Institution. The medal La Pietà di Michelangelo (1964) earned him the J. Sanford Saltus Award and the Mahory Young Memorial Award in 1966.

He continued with monumental sculpture with works such as the gate The Gate of Life for the Children's Queens Zoo in Flushing Meadows–Corona Park (1968) and a bas-relief for Fordham University (1970).

Albino Manca died of cancer in New York City on January 15, 1976. By his will, his remains were brought back to Tertenia, his hometown, to which he had donated several of his works. These today constitute the core of the "Albino Manca" Civic Museum of Modern Art dedicated to him. In the same year, he received a special posthumous award for Gazzella e fico d'India at the exhibition of the National Sculpture Society.

The Ingalls Library and Museum Archives at the Cleveland Museum of Art also holds some archival material.
