= David Hendin =

American numismatist

- Born: December 16, 1945 (age 80); St. Louis, Missouri
- Education: Horton Watkins (Ladue) High School (1963); University of Missouri, Columbia (1967); Missouri School of Journalism (1971)
- Occupations: Ancient coin expert, journalist, publishing executive, author
- Spouse: Jeannie Luciano (m. 1985)
- Children: Sarah (b. 1972), Ben (b. 1975), Alexander (b. 1990)

David Bruce Hendin (born December 16, 1945) is an American numismatist who studies ancient Judean and Biblical coins, ancient scale weights and related archaeology. He was elected president of the American Numismatic Society in 2024. Hendin has also worked as a medical journalist, newspaper columnist, publishing executive, literary agent, and author. Some of Hendin's books include Death as a Fact of Life and the reference Guide to Biblical Coins.

== Early life and education ==
David Bruce Hendin is the son of Aaron and Celeste Sherman Hendin (died 1947) and Lillian Karsh Hendin (married 1949). Hendin spent his early years in St. Louis. After graduating from Ladue Horton Watkins High School in 1963, Hendin attended the University of Missouri, Colombia, and he received his Bachelor of Science in Biology in 1967 and his MA in Journalism in 1970.

== Jewish-Biblical numismatics ==
Hendin's interest in ancient Jewish and Biblical coins began in 1967 during a year as a biology teacher at an agricultural high school near the Israeli town of Ashkelon. Aaron Hendin, M.D., David's father, had been a long-time collector and student of ancient Judean coins, though David had not previously shown interest in the subject.

The younger Hendin went on to be mentored by Ya’akov Meshorer, professor of Archaeology and Numismatics at Hebrew University and Chief Curator of Archaeology at the Israel Museum. Hendin edited and published Meshorer's Ancient Jewish Coinage Vols. I & 2 as well as the English edition of Meshorer's A Treasury of Jewish Coins. Upon Meshorer's death in 2002, Hendin helped establish the Meshorer Prize in Numismatics given by the Israel Museum. He now sits on the board that awards this prize.

In 1985 and 1986, Hendin served as chief numismatist of the Joint Sepphoris Project excavations under the auspices of Duke University (Eric and Carol Meyers) and Hebrew University (Ehud Netzer). He again excavated in 2011 with the Duke team in preparation of their final Sepphoris publication.

Hendin has published more than 80 articles in academic journals. In 1992, he was elected a Fellow of the American Numismatic Society and is now a Life Fellow. He was elected president of the ANS in 2024. He has donated many numismatic and archaeological objects to the Israel Museum, Jerusalem, and was honored in 2001 as a Sponsor of the Israel Museum.

== Journalism career ==
From 1969 to 1993, David Hendin worked with Scripps Howard's United Feature Syndicate (UFS) and Newspaper Enterprise Association. Hendin's Man and his World, was the first syndicated newspaper column on ecology and ran from 1970 until 1973. Following this, Hendin wrote The Medical Consumer, a newspaper column that was published for six years (1973–1979). In 1973, Hendin's book Death as a Fact of Life was serialized in the New York Post and other newspapers nationwide.

Hendin wrote more than 1,000 articles for newspapers and magazines, including Saturday Review, Reader’s Digest, and Science News. His writing has been hailed as “brilliant and highly sensitive,” by The New York Times and as “journalism of the highest order” by The Washington Post. Hendin became Senior Vice President and Editorial Director for United Feature Syndicate in 1980. In that position, Hendin was responsible for signing many columnists and cartoonists, including Michael Kinsley, Ed Koch, Mort Kondracke, Judith Martin, George McGovern, Lincoln Pierce (Big Nate), and Senator William Proxmire.

Hendin also worked with Pulitzer Prize-winning muckraker Jack Anderson and many cartoonists, including Charles M. Schulz (Peanuts), Jim Davis (Garfield), Mort Walker (Beetle Bailey, Gamin & Patches), Mike Peters, and artist Peter Max. In 1992, he was a featured speaker at Ohio State University's Festival of Cartoon Art. From 1971 until 1986, Hendin was also an adjunct professor of journalism and established a New York Science Journalism program at the University of Missouri School of Journalism. In 1975 and 1976, Hendin was an adjunct professor of science and medical journalism at Columbia University's Graduate School of Journalism. Hendin has served on the boards of trustees of the Scripps Howard Foundation, American Friends of the Bible Lands Museum-Jerusalem, the Kinsey Institute for Sex, Gender and Reproduction, The Newspaper Comics Council, the Holy Land Conservation Fund, and the Council for the Advancement of Science Writing. In 1993, Hendin left UFS and became a literary agent. Prior to his retirement, his literary clients included:

- Judith Martin (Miss Manners)
- Mike Peters
- Lincoln Peirce (Big Nate, Max & the MIDKNIGHTS)
- Charles M. Schulz (Peanuts)
- Rabbi Abraham J. Twerski, M.D.
- Elaine Viets
- Tom Wilson (Ziggy)

Hendin was also co-executive producer of the 1993 PBS Special Miss Manners and Company.

== Personal life ==
Hendin has been married since 1985 to Jeannie (née Luciano), retired vice-chair and director of trade publishing at W.W. Norton & Co. Publishers. He has three children: Sarah, born 1972; Ben, born 1975; and Alexander, born 1990.

== Bibliography ==
- 2013: Coins of the Holy Land: The Abraham and Marian Sofaer Collection at the American Numismatic Society and the Israel Museum, I & II. (Ancient Coins in North American Collections 8). Y. Meshorer with G. Bijovsky and Wolfgang Fischer-Bossert, edited by D. Hendin and A. Meadows. American Numismatic Society, New York. ISBN 978-0-89722-283-9
- 2011: Cultural Change: Jewish, Christian, and Islamic Coins of the Holy Land, American Numismatic Society. (Winner: Museum/Exhibit Catalog of Year, Numismatic Literary Guild). ISBN 978-0-89722-319-5
- 2007: Ancient Scale Weights and Pre-Coinage Currency of the Near East, Amphora Books, NY. ISBN 978-0-9654029-4-1.
- 2005: Not Kosher: Forgeries of Ancient Jewish and Biblical Coins, *Amphora Books, NY. ISBN 0-9654029-3-2.
- 1978: The Genetic Connection (with Joan Marks), William Morrow, NY, 1978. (Translations: Hebrew, Portuguese). ISBN 0-688-03265-6.
- 1978: Collecting Coins, Signet Books, NY. ISBN 0-451-08405-5.
- 1977: The Life Givers, William Morrow, NY, 1977. (1977 Book of the Year, American Medical Writer's Association). ISBN 0-688-03035-1
- 1977: The World Almanac Whole Health Guide, Signet/NAL, NY. Lib. Congress 76-48583.
- 1976: Guide to Ancient Jewish Coins, Attic Books, NY. ISBN 0-915018-11-X.
  - 1987: Guide to Biblical Coins, 2nd Edition Revised and Expanded, Amphora Books, NY. ISBN 0-88687-328-2.
  - 1996: Guide to Biblical Coins, 3rd Edition Revised and Expanded, Amphora Books, NY. ISBN 0-9654029-0-8.
  - 2001: Guide to Biblical Coins, 4th Edition Revised and Expanded, Amphora Books, NY. ISBN 0-9654029-2-4.
  - 2010: Guide to Biblical Coins, 5th Edition, Amphora Books, NY. ISBN 978-0-9654029-5-8.
  - 2021: Guide to Biblical Coins, 6th Edition, American Numismatic Society, NY. ISBN 978-0-8972237-0-6
- 1972: Save Your Child’s Life, Enterprise Books, NY, 1972; Doubleday-Dolphin, NY,
  - 1974, Save Your Child’s Life, Revised: Pharos Books, NY, 1986. (Translations: Spanish, Portuguese). ISBN 978-0-88687-291-5.
- 1973: Death as a Fact of Life, W.W. Norton, NY, 1973; Warner Books, NY, 1974; W.W. Norton, NY, 1984. (Translations: Japanese, Chinese, Russian). ISBN 0-393-30134-6.
- 1971: The Doctor’s Save Your Heart Diet (recipes by Aileen Claire), Award Books (Grosset & Dunlap), NY. ASIN: B001II11MY
- 1971: Everything You Need to Know About Abortion, Pinnacle Books, NY. ASIN: B0006W2GPE

== Awards ==
- 2022: Burnett Anderson Award for Excellence in Numismatic Writing. American Numismatic Society, American Numismatic Association, Numismatic Literary Guild.
- 2022: Shekel Award for Best Book of the Year,2022 Guide to Biblical Coins 6th Edition, American Israel Numismatic Association
- 2022: Trustees Award American Numismatic Society.
- 2013: Gunnar Holst Numismatic Foundation Medal, Swedish Numismatic Society, University of Gothenburg, Gothenburg, Sweden.
- 2013: Best Museum Exhibit Catalog of Year. Coins of the Holy Land, the Abraham and Marian Sofaer Collection at the American Numismatic Society and The Israel Museum (American Numismatic Society), Numismatic Literary Guild.
- 2012: Best Auction Catalog of Year. The Shoshana Collection of Ancient Judean Coins I (Heritage), Numismatic Literary Guild.
- 2012: Best Museum Exhibit Catalog of Year. Cultural Change, Jewish, Christian, and Islamic Coins of the Holy Land (American Numismatic Society), Numismatic Literary Guild.
- 2011: Sundman Lecture, American Numismatic Association
- 2003: Presidential Award, American Numismatic Association.
- 2002: Distinguished Alumnus, Horton Watkins (Ladue) High School, St. Louis, Mo.
- 2000 & 1993: Best Magazine Column Award, Numismatic Literary Guild.
- 1996: Ben Odesser Judaic Literary Award, American Israel Numismatic Association.
- 1992: Life Fellow, American Numismatic Society.
- 1976: Book of the Year (The Life Givers), American Medical Writer's Association.
- 1974: Who’s Who in America (1974-), Who’s Who in the World (1995-).
- 1974: Claude Bernard Science Journalism Award (Honorable Mention), National Society for Medical Research.
- 1973: Howard Blakeslee Award, American Heart Association.
- 1972: Medical Journalism Award, American Medical Association.
