= Theodore Spicer-Simson =

French sculptor and medallist (1871–1959)

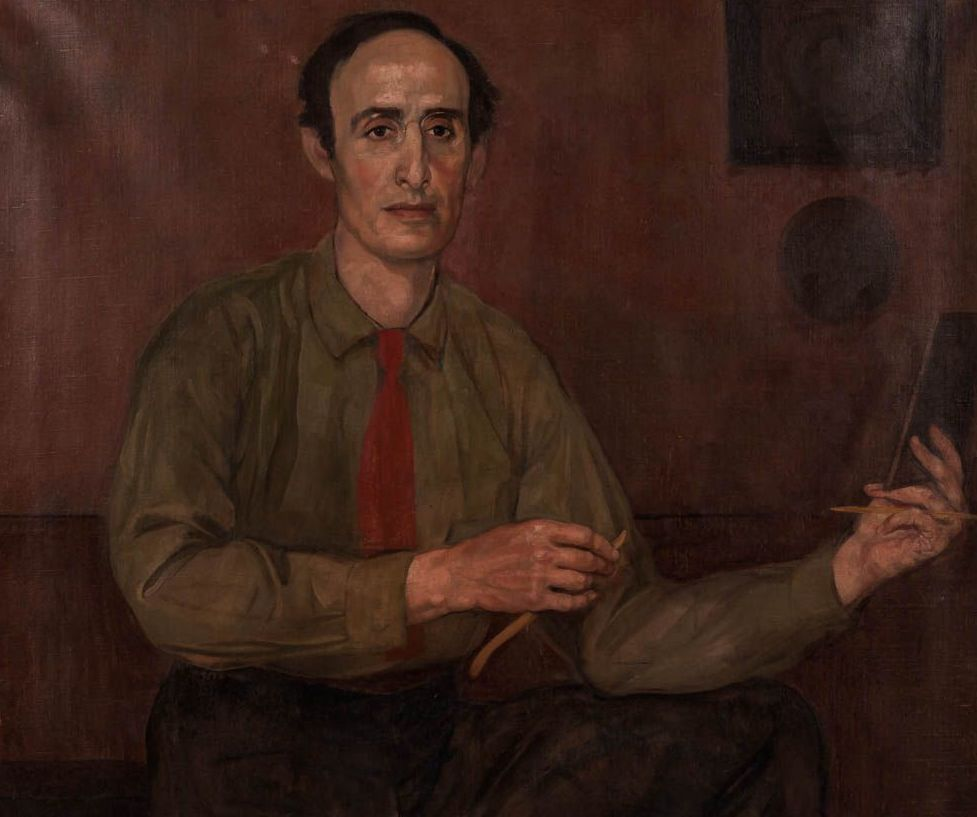
- from a portrait by Henry Caro Delvaille
- Born: 25 June 1871; Le Havre
- Died: 1 February 1959 (aged 87); Miami
- Alma mater: Beaux-Arts de Paris
- Occupation: Sculptor, medalist
- Spouse(s): Margaret Spicer-Simson
- Awards: J. Sanford Saltus Medal Award (1955)

Theodore Spicer-Simson (25 June 1871 - 1 February 1959) was a French sculptor and medallist, who married and lived with Margaret Spicer-Simson in Paris. Some of his medallions included engravings of people such as Leo and Ella Mielziner, Henri Monod, and James Stephens.

== Biography ==
Theodore Spicer-Simson was born on June 25, 1871, to parents Frederick John Simson and Dora Mary Spicer. He was educated at various boarding schools abroad across Europe. After he graduated, he enrolled in the Ecole des Beaux-Arts. While in Paris, he met Margaret Schmidt whom he traveled to Washington D.C., with and married on July 1, 1896. In 1899, the couple returned to Paris due to the United States' joining the Spanish-American War. They eventually settled in Bourron, near Fontainebleau, in a house named 'Volets Verts'. In December 1940, he was interned at the Vauban barracks camp in Besancon, France. Spicer-Simson died on February 1, 1959, after a long illness.
