= Lura Beam =

American educator, writer, and researcher

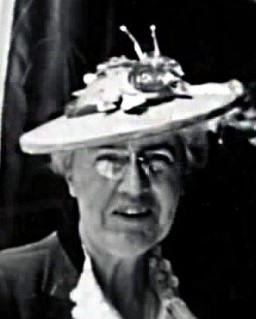
- Born: Lura Ella Beam; April 1, 1887; Marshfield, Maine, U.S.
- Died: 1978 (aged 90–91); Marshfield, Maine, U.S.
- Education: B.A., Barnard College, 1908; M.A. Columbia University, 1917
- Occupations: Educator, writer, researcher
- Partner: Louise Stevens Bryant
- Writing career
- Notable work: A Maine Hamlet (1957)

Lura Ella Beam (April 1, 1887–May 1978) was an American educator, writer, and researcher. Her interests included the poor, minorities, women, education, and the arts. She co-authored two books discussing medical studies on sex adjustment and sex education with Robert Latou Dickinson, and a noted memoir of growing up in turn-of-the-century Marshfield, Maine. She was the long-time companion of Louise Stevens Bryant.

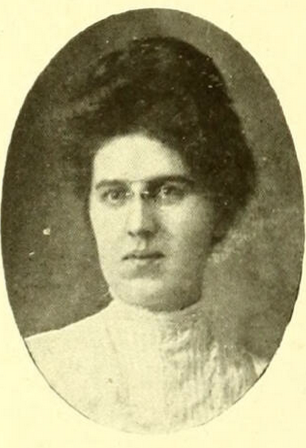
Lura Beam, from the 1908 yearbook of Barnard College

== Early life and education ==
Lura Beam was born in Marshfield, Maine, in 1887. After graduating from the area high school in 1904, she attended the University of California at Berkeley for two years before transferring to Barnard College. She graduated from the latter institution in 1908. In 1917 she earned a master's degree from Columbia University.

== Career ==
Beam started her working life with the American Missionary Association. She worked as a teacher in all-black schools in Wilmington, North Carolina, and Memphis, Tennessee, for three years and then became an administrator with the organization, serving as Assistant Superintendent of Education in the Deep South. She went on to work for other non-profit institutions such as the Association of American Colleges and Universities (1919–1926), the National Committee on Maternal Health (1927–1933), the General Education Board in New York City, the Interchurch World Movement, and the American Association of University Women (1937–1952).

As head of the arts department of the American Association of University Women in the 1940s, Beam helped assemble a series of traveling art exhibitions that circulated among AAUW branches. These exhibits, attended by more than 770,000 viewers, presented "artwork based on themes such as the artwork of Colorado or Mexican children, trends in American painting, and African sculpture", as well as modern art and reproductions by Picasso, Matisse, Klee, and Roualt.

Beam retired in 1952 but continued to write and organize art exhibitions; she also assembled research on aging and retirement.

== Works ==
Beam co-authored two books with physician Robert Latou Dickinson, A Thousand Marriages: A medical study of sex adjustment (1931) and The Single Woman: A medical study in sex education (1934). In these books, Beam "adopted a feminist perspective by focusing on the changing historical context that affected women's lives between 1895 and 1930, as well as by analyzing the dominant-submissive relationship between the male physician (Dickinson) and his female patients".

Beam is best known in her home state for her 1957 work A Maine Hamlet, which one review called "the book that a generation of readers treasured as the most perceptive account of traditional life in Maine ever written". Beam wrote vividly about growing up with her grandparents in Marshfield, Maine, at the turn of the century, describing the residents, institutions, lifestyle and community tenets.

== Personal life ==
Beam was the long-time companion of Louise Stevens Bryant, whom she met around 1920, when Bryant worked for the Girl Scouts. Later, both women worked for the Committee on Maternal Health. Their relationship spanned nearly 35 years. Bryant was the one who encouraged Beam to write her memories of small-town life in her book A Maine Hamlet (1957). After Bryant's death in 1957, Beam prepared her biography in the work Bequest from a Life: A biography of Louise Stevens Bryant (1963).

Beam died in 1978. Her papers are held by the Arthur and Elizabeth Schlesinger Library on the History of Women in America at the Radcliffe Institute for Advanced Study at Harvard University.

== Selected bibliography ==
Beam's works include:

- A Thousand Marriages: A medical study of sex adjustment. Williams & Wilkins. 1931., republished 1970 (with Robert Latou Dickinson)
- The Single Woman: A medical study in sex education. Williams & Wilkins. 1934., republished in 1987 (with Robert Latou Dickinson)
- Theatre. American Association of University Women. 1941.
- A Maine Hamlet. W. Funk. 1957., republished in the mid-1980s and in 2000
- Bequest from a Life: A biography of Louise Stevens Bryant. Waverly Press. 1963.
- He Called Them by the Lightning: A teacher's odyssey in the Negro South, 1908–1919. Bobbs-Merrill. 1967.
