= Marshfield, Maine =

Town in Maine, United States

- Town
- Location within Maine Location within the United States
- Coordinates: 44°45′43″N 67°29′52″W
- Country: United States
- State: Maine
- County: Washington

Area
  - Total: 17.54 sq mi (45.43 km^{2})
  - Land: 17.01 sq mi (44.06 km^{2})
  - Water: 0.53 sq mi (1.37 km^{2})
- Elevation: 213 ft (65 m)

Population (2020)
  - Total: 528
  - Density: 31/sq mi (12/km^{2})
- Time zone: UTC-5 (Eastern (EST))
  - Summer (DST): UTC-4 (EDT)
- ZIP Code: 04654
- Area code: 207
- FIPS code: 23-43640
- GNIS feature ID: 582581
- Website: www.marshfieldmaine.gov

Marshfield is a town in Washington County, Maine, United States. The population was 528 at the 2020 census.

== Geography ==
According to the United States Census Bureau, the town has a total area of 17.54 square miles (45.43 km^{2}), of which 17.01 square miles (44.06 km^{2}) is land and 0.53 square miles (1.37 km^{2}) is water.

== Demographics ==
Historical population
Census	Pop.	Note	%±
1850	294		—
1860	328		11.6%
1870	350		6.7%
1880	300		−14.3%
1890	299		−0.3%
1900	227		−24.1%
1910	178		−21.6%
1920	187		5.1%
1930	197		5.3%
1940	173		−12.2%
1950	221		27.7%
1960	267		20.8%
1970	227		−15.0%
1980	416		83.3%
1990	461		10.8%
2000	494		7.2%
2010	518		4.9%
2020	528		1.9%
U.S. Decennial Census

=== 2010 census ===
As of the census of 2010, there were 518 people, 199 households, and 148 families living in the town. The population density was 30.5 inhabitants per square mile (11.8/km^{2}). There were 246 housing units at an average density of 14.5 per square mile (5.6/km^{2}). The racial makeup of the town was 99.0% White, 0.4% African American, 0.2% Native American, and 0.4% from two or more races. Hispanic or Latino of any race were 0.8% of the population.

There were 199 households, of which 35.2% had children under the age of 18 living with them, 64.8% were married couples living together, 7.0% had a female householder with no husband present, 2.5% had a male householder with no wife present, and 25.6% were non-families. 20.1% of all households were made up of individuals, and 6.5% had someone living alone who was 65 years of age or older. The average household size was 2.60 and the average family size was 2.97.

The median age in the town was 43 years. 24.3% of residents were under the age of 18; 5.3% were between the ages of 18 and 24; 23.2% were from 25 to 44; 29.5% were from 45 to 64; and 17.8% were 65 years of age or older. The gender makeup of the town was 49.4% male and 50.6% female.

=== 2000 census ===
As of the census of 2000, there were 494 people, 196 households, and 145 families living in the town. The population density was 29.0 inhabitants per square mile (11.2/km^{2}). There were 239 housing units at an average density of 14.0 per square mile (5.4/km^{2}). The racial makeup of the town was 97.57% White, 0.20% African American, 0.40% Native American, 0.20% Asian, and 1.62% from two or more races. Hispanic or Latino of any race were 0.40% of the population.

There were 196 households, out of which 33.2% had children under the age of 18 living with them, 59.7% were married couples living together, 9.7% had a female householder with no husband present, and 26.0% were non-families. 20.4% of all households were made up of individuals, and 8.7% had someone living alone who was 65 years of age or older. The average household size was 2.52 and the average family size was 2.88.

In the town, the population was spread out, with 25.7% under the age of 18, 6.5% from 18 to 24, 24.7% from 25 to 44, 29.1% from 45 to 64, and 14.0% who were 65 years of age or older. The median age was 41 years. For every 100 females, there were 95.3 males. For every 100 females age 18 and over, there were 91.1 males.

The median income for a household in the town was $36,458, and the median income for a family was $40,455. Males had a median income of $35,000 versus $20,481 for females. The per capita income for the town was $15,969. About 6.6% of families and 9.8% of the population were below the poverty line, including 11.4% of those under age 18 and 16.7% of those age 65 or over.

== Notable person ==
- Lura Beam (1887–1978), writer and educator
