= Ute Wartenberg =

German numismatist

Ute Wartenberg FSA
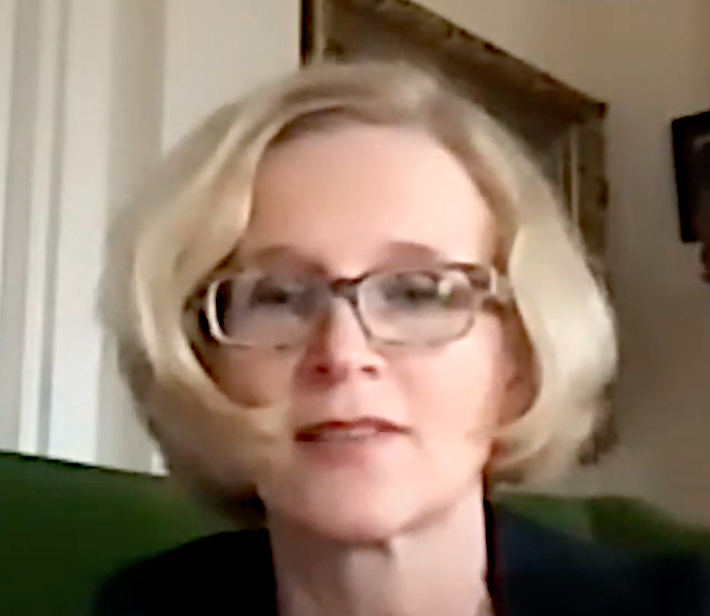
- Wartenberg in 2021
- Born: 1963 (age 62–63); Saarbrücken, Saarland, West Germany

Academic background
- Education: University of Saarbrücken (BA); University of Oxford (DPhil)
- Thesis: Some papyri from Oxyrhynchus (1990)

Academic work
- Discipline: Papyrology
- Institutions: University of Oxford; British Museum; American Numismatic Society; Columbia University

President of the American Numismatic Society
- Incumbent
- Assumed office 24 October 2020
- Preceded by: Sydney F. Martin

Ute Wartenberg FSA (born 1963) is a German numismatist and the first woman president and executive director of the American Numismatic Society (ANS). Wartenberg serves as an adjunct professor of classics at Columbia University and as the curator of the Amastris Collection, a private collection of Greek coins.

Wartenberg obtained her D.Phil. in papyrology and classical literature from Oxford University on a Rhodes Scholarship, and later taught there. After two decades as ANS Executive Director, she took on a research curator role, before being elected as the ANS President in 2020. She returned to the role of Executive Director in 2024.

== Career ==
Wartenberg received an undergraduate education at the University of Saarbrucken, where she studied ancient history. After graduating, she enrolled in the University of Oxford as a Rhodes scholar, completing her dissertation entitled Some papyri from Oxyrhynchus in 1990 at the Faculty of Literae Humaniores. From 1991 to 1998, Wartenberg was the Curator of Greek Coins at the British Museum in London. She then oversaw the American Numismatics Society as the executive director for twenty years. In 2000, she drove a controversial budget-cutting and reorganization to reduce the society's deficit, which included a move of the Society's facilities to a new location in the Manhattan Financial District, followed by a second move to SoHo.

In 2002, Wartenberg was appointed to the Citizens Commemorative Coin Advisory Committee of the United States Mint, of which she was later appointed Chairperson. Wartenberg was Chairperson of the Citizens Coinage Advisory Committee from 2003 to 2007.

In 2017, Wartenberg was appointed on the Anti-Counterfeiting Task Force committee of the Anti-Counterfeiting Educational Foundation.

Since 2008, she has been a Trustee of the Augustus Saint-Gaudens Memorial in New Hampshire. She was a Trustee, President and CEO of the Annie Tinker Association for Women from 2009-18. Wartenberg has served on the Committee of the International Numismatic Council since 2015. In 2019, she was elected Chairperson of ICOM International Committee for Money and Banking Museums.

== Research ==
Wartenberg has published widely in research journals and numismatic publications and is a well-known editor, co-editor, and contributor for major research publications in numismatics. These include White Gold: Studies in Early Electrum Coinage with ANS Chief Curator Peter van Alfen, as well as numismatic Festschriften, including Presbeus: Studies in Ancient Coinage Presented to Richard Ashton with Andrew Meadows and ΚΑΙΡΟΣ: Contributions to Numismatics in Honor of Basil Demetriadi.

== Honors ==
Wartenberg was elected as Numismatic Ambassador in 2002. She was made a Fellow of the Society of Antiquaries of London in 2008. She was awarded the honorary award of the Gesellschaft für Internationale Geldgeschichte in Germany in 2015. In 2017 she was a Visiting Professor of the City of Wrocław, Poland.

== Personal life ==
She is married to Jonathan Kagan, a numismatist who also studied classics at Oxford.
