= João Duarte (numismatist) =

Portuguese numismatist

João Duarte (born 1952 in Lisbon) is a Portuguese numismatist. He is the recipient of the American Numismatic Society's 2011 J. Sanford Saltus Award for Signal Achievement in the Art of the Medal.
