= One Hudson Square =

Building in Manhattan, New York

Coordinates: 40.723441°N 74.006851°W

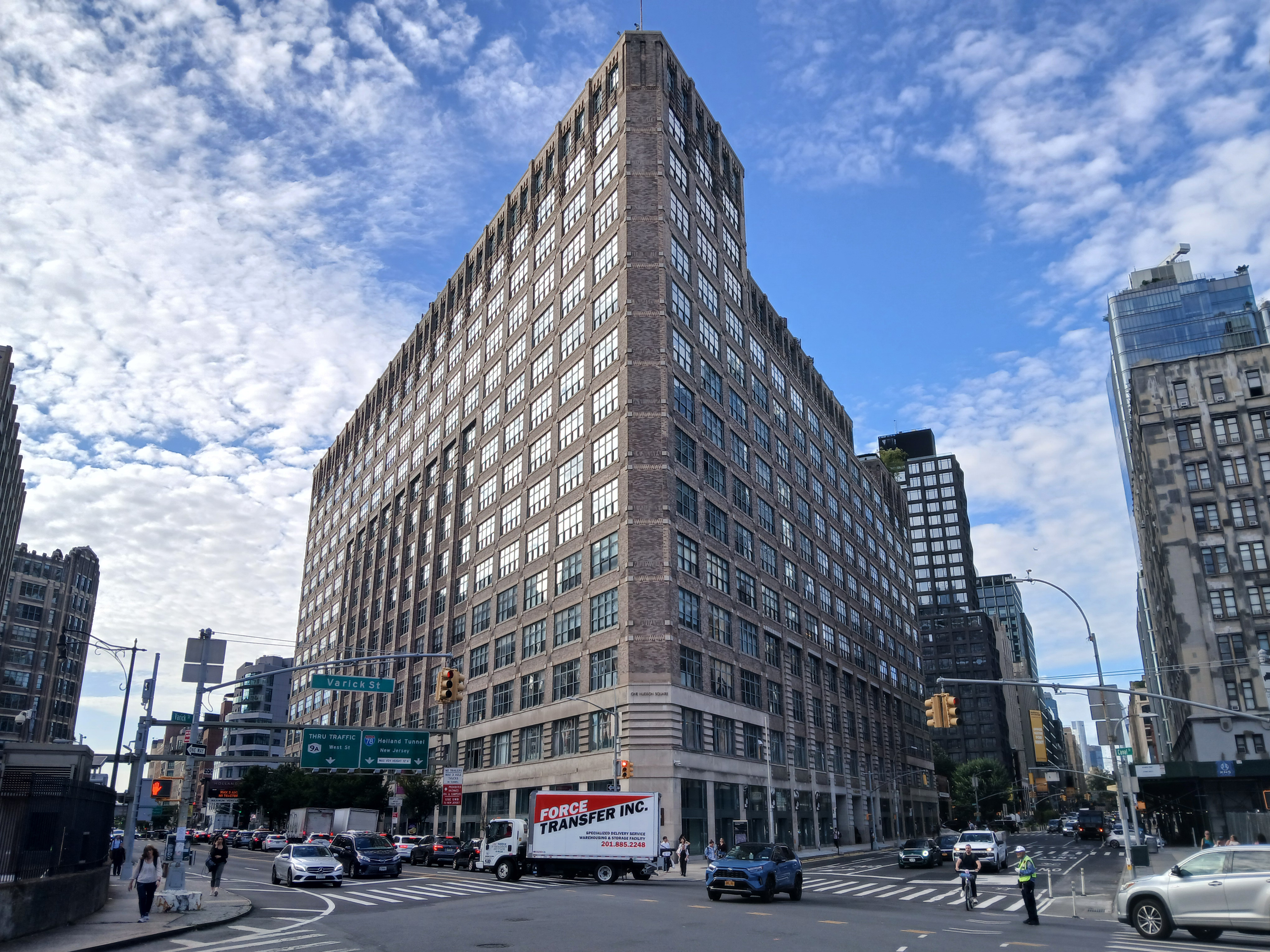
One Hudson Square as seen from Canal and Varick Streets in 2025

One Hudson Square is an 18-story industrial building located in the Hudson Square neighborhood of Manhattan, New York City. It was built in 1929 and 1930 and was designed by noted architect Ely Jacques Kahn in the modern-classical style.

The building is located at 75 Varick Street on a lot bounded by Canal Street, Hudson Street, and Watts Street, and faces the Holland Tunnel entrance. It was commissioned by Abe Adelson, and built by the New York Investing Company on land owned by Trinity Church.

Because Hudson Square was at the time New York's primary printing district, many early tenants in the building were involved in the printing trade and related companies. These included the Macmillan Company publishers, American Book Bindery, Royal Typewriter Company. Leo Alexander & Co., a distributor of farm trucks and tractors, leased a showroom store for an aggregate rental price of $40,000. The lease was made at the end of January 1931.

In July 1933, the Holland Plaza Building was sold by the New York Investing Company to the Lortay Corporation. The transaction price exceeded $5 million; the property was subject to a $4,000,000 mortgage held by the Metropolitan Life Insurance Company.

The building, now known as One Hudson Square, was designated a New York City landmark on August 6, 2013.

== See also ==
- List of New York City Designated Landmarks in Manhattan below 14th Street
