= Ingalls Library =

Research library of the Cleveland Museum of Art

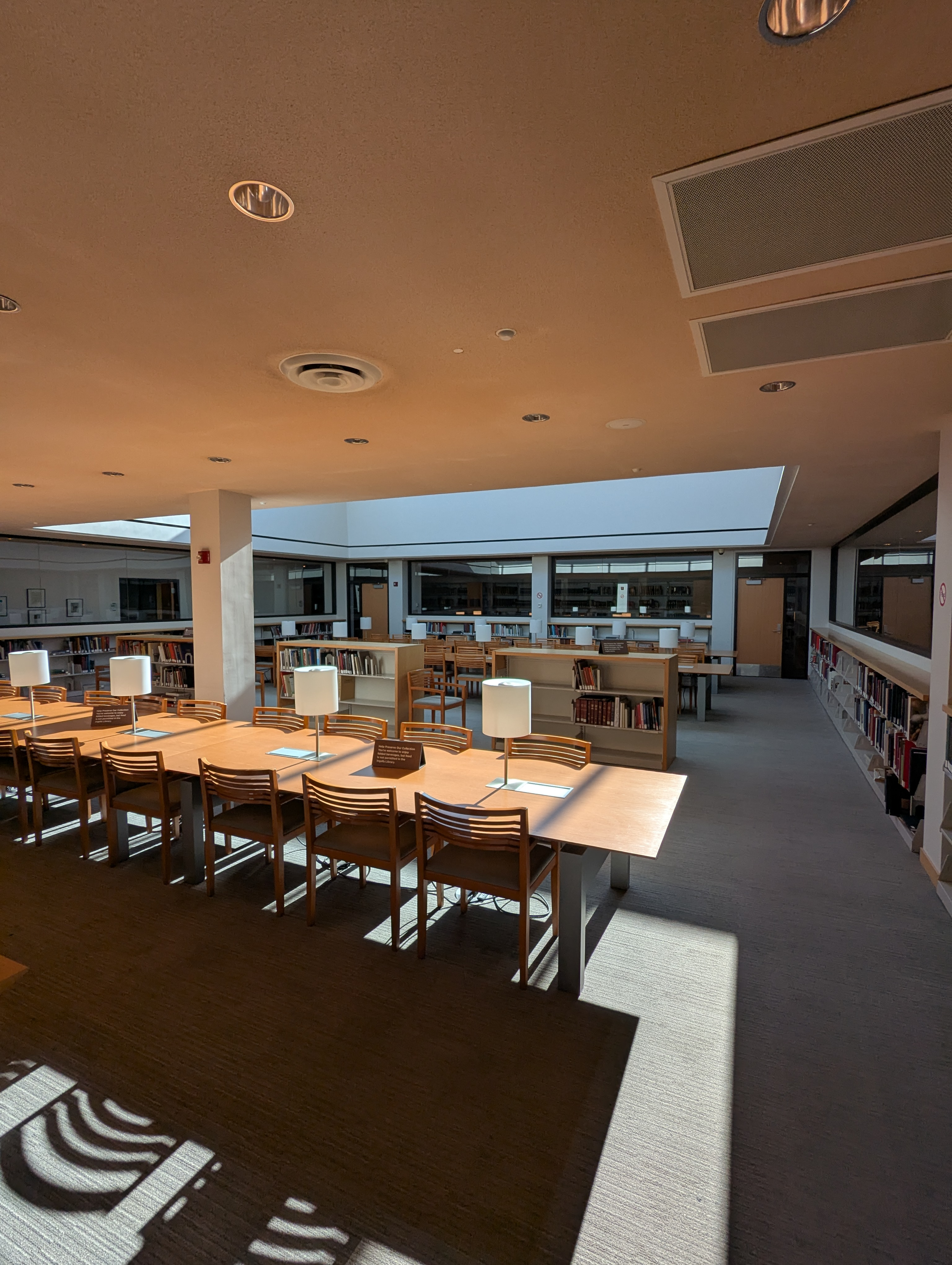
- View of Ingalls Library reading room in 2025
- Established: 1913
- Location: 11150 East Blvd, Cleveland, US
- Coordinates: 41.507°N 81.611°W
- Type: Non-circulating research library
- Collection size: 580,000
- Director: Leslie Cade
- Website: Library website

The Ingalls Library is the research library of the Cleveland Museum of Art, located on floor 2R in the Marcel Breuer-designed wing on the north side of the main museum building. The library was founded in 1913 concurrent with the founding of the museum. The library is primarily used by museum employees, graduate students in Case Western Reserve University's art history program, and researchers; however, it is also open to the public. The collection of the library and archives contains "published materials covering art from all geographic areas and all periods of art history, as well as archival collections documenting the history of the Cleveland Museum of Art. Materials are collected in many languages and in all formats."

The Ingalls Library is named for former trustees Jane Taft Ingalls and Louise Harkness Ingalls.

== Ingalls Library ==
The museum and library opened in 1916. The library collections contained approximately 600 donated volumes, which reflected the collection. A significant donation occurred in 1939, when the library received the late William H. Marlatt's collection of over 300 fine press printed books. Included was a nearly complete set of works printed from 1891 to 1898 at William Morris' Kelmscott Press. The transition to a strategically built collection was made possible by the bequest of more than $33 million ($378 million in 2025) to the museum by benefactor and trustee Leonard Hanna in 1957. The following year, with the collection steadily growing, the library moved to expanded quarters. In 1967, the joint Cleveland Museum of Art/Case Western Reserve University art history and museum studies program was established. In 1979, the library added its 100,000th volume. In 1983, a new library was constructed and named in honor of former trustees Jane Taft Ingalls and Louise Harkness Ingalls. In 2008, the library transitioned to the Library of Congress Classification System. In 2015 the library added its 500,000th volume. The Ingalls Library adds approximately 8,000 books and 3,600 auction catalogues per year, in addition to more than 1,100 periodical subscriptions and 33 database subscriptions.
