= Robert Latou Dickinson =

American obstetrician (1861–1950)

Robert L. Dickinson
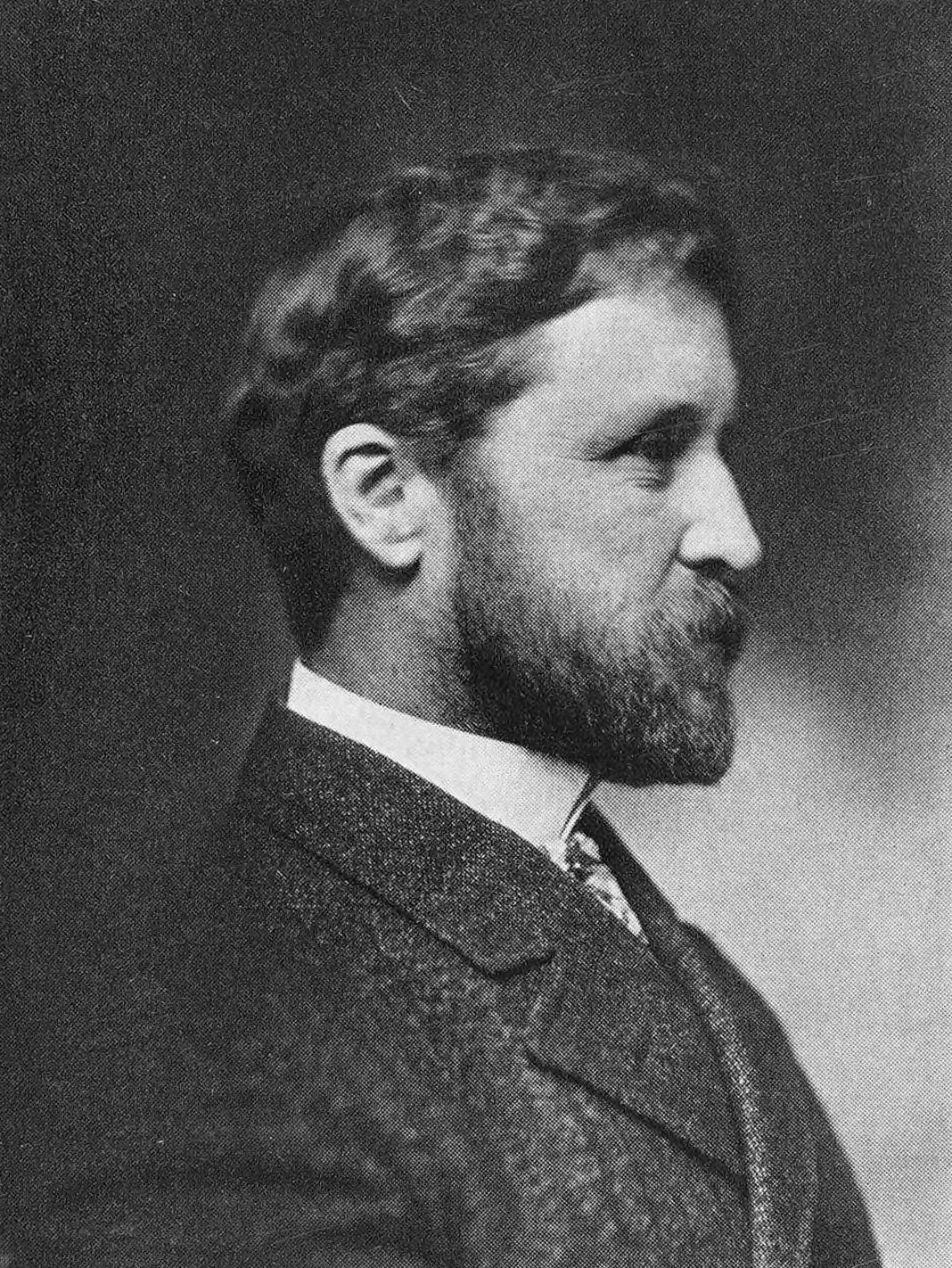
- Born: Robert Latou Dickinson; February 21, 1861; Jersey City, New Jersey, U.S.
- Died: November 29, 1950 (aged 89); Amherst, Massachusetts, U.S.
- Occupations: Physician; educator; sculptor; illustrator
- Spouse: Sarah Kidder Truslow (died 1938)
- Children: 3

Robert Latou Dickinson (February 21, 1861 – November 29, 1950) was an American obstetrician and gynecologist, surgeon, maternal health educator, artist, sculptor and medical illustrator, research scientist, author, and public health educator. He also became a prolific artist, carver, and sculptor, who used his skills to illustrate his professional work.

== Early life and education ==
Robert Latou Dickinson was born on February 21, 1861, in Jersey City, New Jersey, the son of Horace and Jeannette Latou Dickinson. He sketched all his life, including many drawings in the margins of his school books.

According to James Reed, as a boy of ten, Rob Dickinson was trying to beach a boat that he and his father had built. An eddy drove the metal prow into Dickinson's abdomen, gashing it deeply. Holding the two sides of the wound together and some internal organs inside, Dickinson dragged himself to shore; his injury was stitched by a lay person, but it took a long time to heal and a scar remained for the rest of his life. Thereafter, Dickinson determined to become a doctor.

He attended the Brooklyn Polytechnic Institute and studied for four years at schools in Germany and Switzerland, sketching and studying classical art all the time. After his return, Dickinson studied at the Long Island College Hospital, and received his medical degree in 1882. He interned at Williamsburg Hospital.

== Career ==
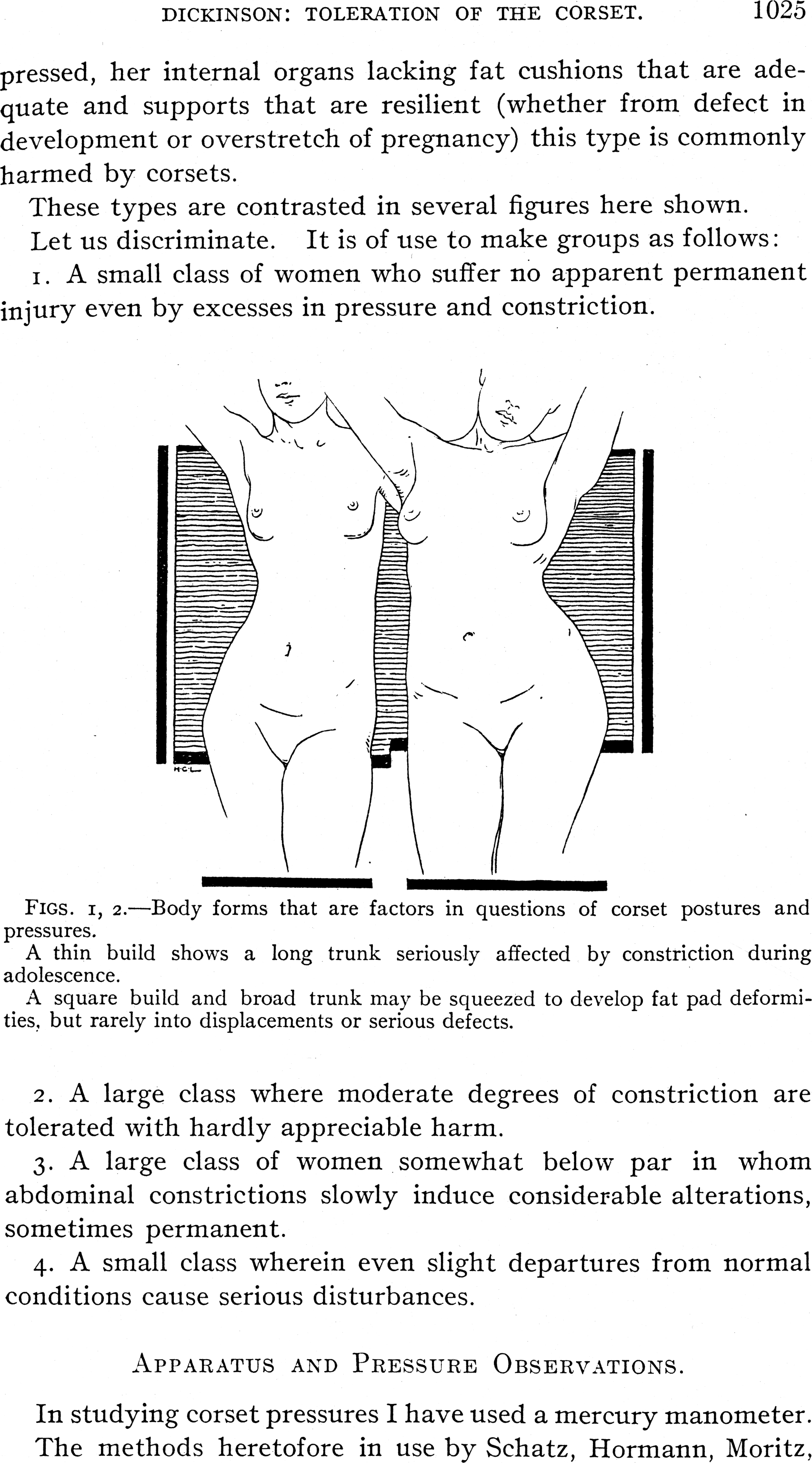
A page from R. L. Dickinson's treatise, "Toleration of the Corset" in the American Journal of Obstetrics and Diseases of Women and Children, June 1911

Dickinson practiced obstetrics and gynecology in Brooklyn. He was professor of obstetrics and gynecology at the Long Island College of Medicine. He became chief of obstetrics and gynecology at the Brooklyn Hospital. He was also on the staff at Methodist Episcopal Hospital and Kings County Hospital Center. During the First World War, he was assistant chief of the medical section of the Council of National Defense, and medical advisor on the general staff. He had the rank of lieutenant colonel. Following the war, he led two missions to China for the United States Public Health Service. He served a turn as president of the American College of Surgeons, which he had helped to create, president of the American Gynecological Society, and chairman of the obstetrics section of the American Medical Association. He was also president of the New York Obstetrical Society. He was president of the Euthanasia Society of America from 1946 to his death. He was also senior vice president of the Planned Parenthood Federation of America at the time of his death. Dickinson won the Lasker Award in 1946 for his work in human fertility.

In 1910, Dickinson published "Toleration of the corset: Prescribing where one cannot proscribe", in which he investigated the medical effects of corsets, including the displacement and deformation of internal organs. He found that, while some women could wear these garments without evident damage, the vast majority of users sustained permanent deformations and damage to their health.

Dickinson was one of the first physician-scientists to obtain detailed sexual histories of his patients. A painstakingly accurate pen-and-ink artist, he made many drawings and sketches during a patient interaction. Such sketches included drawings of the patients' genitalia. Over his career he collected about 5,200 sexual case histories. Dickinson was the medical illustrator for many medical publications and textbooks. He used electric cauterization for the treatment of cervicitis and for intrauterine ablation for sterilization.

In the 1920s, he closed his practice and focused on sexual research and contraception, and other public health education. In 1923, Dickinson founded the National Committee on Maternal Health. This society addressed problems of infertility, birth control, and sexual behavior. Dickinson was particularly interested in homosexual desire in women, which he believed was a threat to heterosexual procreation and marriage.

Over the years Dickinson changed his assumptions about what constituted perverse sexual behavior. By 1934 he would write that homosexuality "has been stressed far beyond its numerical significance or its importance as a harmful interference with normal response. Physiology is teaching us that we are all in some degree bisexual and that we possess some sex traits other than those characteristics of our overt type, with two series of stages between extreme masculinity and complete femininity." He said that "To stamp [female homosexuality] a 'perversion,' instead of a deviation or deprivation, is to lack a sense of proportion, if not sound judgment." He also said, though, that women's "non-marriage and non-mating" was a "social and biological thwarting," constituting "the frustration of love-comradeship, child-rearing and home-making." He expressed no awareness of how women were faced with the male-dominant legal requirements for marriage, assigning women responsibilities for child-rearing and home-making from which men were exempt, and no awareness on the impact to children of this distortion.

As a supporter of birth control and the eugenics movement, he gave professional support to Margaret Sanger, but opposed her in the question who should control birth control: Dickinson thought that physicians should be in charge of the process. He studied the coital interaction, published his research, and debunked sexual myths such as that the penis and cervix would interlock during human copulation. Publication of his writings was hampered by the Comstock laws until 1931. Dickinson's work strongly influenced Alfred Kinsey. Much of Dickinson's later work concerned human homosexuality, including his 1935-1941 human study in New York, funded by the Committee for the Study of Sex Variants, in which he attempted to locate the psychogenic and biological source of homosexuality. Dickinson believed that in finding the sources, he might be able to intervene and prevent homosexual desire from manifesting as a social problem.

In 1924, Dickinson retired from actively practicing medicine to study human fertility. In the late 1930s, he began a collaboration with the sculptor Abram Belskie, resulting in the creation of many life-size medical models. Their Birth Series, depicting the processes of gestation and delivery, was displayed to crowds at the 1939 New York World's Fair, and copies of the sculptures were distributed world-wide. For many years, the popular series was on display at the Museum of Science in Boston, Massachusetts. In later years, the two artists worked with plastic and latex, doing pioneering work in medical modeling. At the time of Dickinson's death, the Dickinson/Belskie studio was full of models of women and children, including a sculpture of the (then) "largest baby in the world" with the "smallest viable baby in the world" seated on its lap. He was a member of the National Sculpture Society.

== Personal life ==
Dickinson married Sarah Kidder Truslow, who worked with many New York City human services organizations, including the Young Women's Christian Association and the Travelers Aid Society of New York. She died in 1938. They had three daughters, one of whom died in infancy. One of his daughters married educator George Brown Barbour.

Throughout his life Dickinson fascinated family and friends with his sketching; some sketches, including those for the Washington Walk Book, are at the Library of Congress. In addition to numerous published medical drawings, he made thousands of sketches of places, trees, vistas, figures, and boats, notably in parks, on mountain trails, at Squam Lake in New Hampshire, and in China. One of Dickinson's folios was full of colored sketches of gaily painted Chinese junks. Many sketches were converted into frontispieces and cards.

Dickinson was, all his life, a vigorous outdoorsman. He enjoyed swimming and diving, doing backflips at Squam Lake well into his eighties. He also worked for many hours a week, improving hiking trails at Squam and helping friends and family with outdoor projects.

Dickinson and his wife and family walked and hiked, sailed and canoed all over the world, in China, in Europe, in Washington DC (where he was briefly Acting Surgeon General), on Squam Lake, and in New York City. He illustrated many editions of the New York Walk Book and published Palisades Interstate Park, written and illustrated by him in 1921 for the American Geographical Society of New York.

A man of deep Episcopalian faith, he was associated with the Church of the Holy Trinity in Brooklyn for more than fifty years, before he moved to Manhattan. He lived on East 50th Street in Manhattan. Dickinson died on November 29, 1950, at the home of his daughter in Amherst, Massachusetts. He was cremated. Prior to his death, he was worked on a book called The Marriage Counselor. On the day he died, he was revising sketches for a new edition of The New York Walk Book.

== Publications ==
Books by Robert Latou Dickinson include:

- The American text-book of obstetrics for practitioners and students (1903), with James Chalmers Cameron and Richard Cooper Norris
- Palisades Interstate Park (1921)
- The New York Walk Book, many editions in the 1920s - present (early editions by Torry, Place, and Dickinson)
- The Safe Period as a Birth Control measure (1927)
- The Birth Control Movement (1927)
- Control of Conception: An Illustrated Medical Manual (Medical Aspects of Human Fertility) (1931)
- Human Sex Anatomy, (1932, 1949, 1971)
- Thousand Marriages: A Medical Study of Sex Adjustment (1933, 1970)
- The Single Woman: A Medical Study in Sex Education, by Robert Latou Dickinson and Lura Beam (1934)
- Techniques of Conception Control (1942, 1950)
- Atlas of Human Sex Anatomy (1949)
- Birth atlas: Of twenty four sculptures on fertilization, steps of growth, stages of labor and involution (Dickinson series of teaching models) (1953, 1960, 1968)

=== Papers ===
The Robert Latou Dickinson Papers were donated to the Francis A. Countway Library of Medicine and the Kinsey Institute for Sex Research by Dickinson's daughter, Dorothy Dickinson Barbour. The Robert Latou Dickinson Papers, 1881-1972, and 1883-1950, record much of Dickinson's work on anatomical models at the New York Academy of Medicine. They document some of his professional involvement in the Birth Control Federation of America, National Committee on Maternal Health, and the Euthanasia Society of America. The collection contains some of Dickinson's correspondence, research and writing files; patient case records, illustrations, some lantern slides from his research and professional activities in the birth control movement, and dozens of the sketches for which he was so well known.

=== Models ===
The Dickinson-Belskie Obstetrical Model Collection was acquired in 2007 by the Warren Anatomical Museum in Boston, Massachusetts. It comprises over 200 medical models, including Normman and Norma, intended to represent the average American man and woman.

The Birth Series was on public display for decades at the Boston Museum of Science, but its current location and status are unknown as of 2023.
