= American Numismatic Society =

American association based in New York City

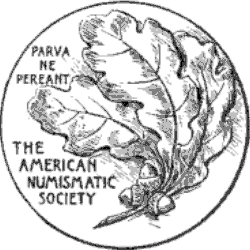
- Logo from a 1918 publication
- Founded: 1858; 168 years ago
- Type: Museum and Research Institute
- Purpose: Numismatics
- Location(s): One Hudson Square; New York City, New York, United States
- Coordinates: 40°43′24″N 74°0′23″W
- President: David Hendin
- Executive Director: Ute Wartenberg
- Affiliations: American Council of Learned Societies, American Alliance of Museums, International Numismatic Council
- Website: numismatics.org

The American Numismatic Society (ANS) is a New York City-based organization dedicated to the study of coins, money, medals, tokens, and related objects. Founded in 1858, it holds nearly one million items, including medals and paper money, and the world's most comprehensive library of numismatic literature. Dr. Ute Wartenberg is the current Executive Director.

== Introduction ==
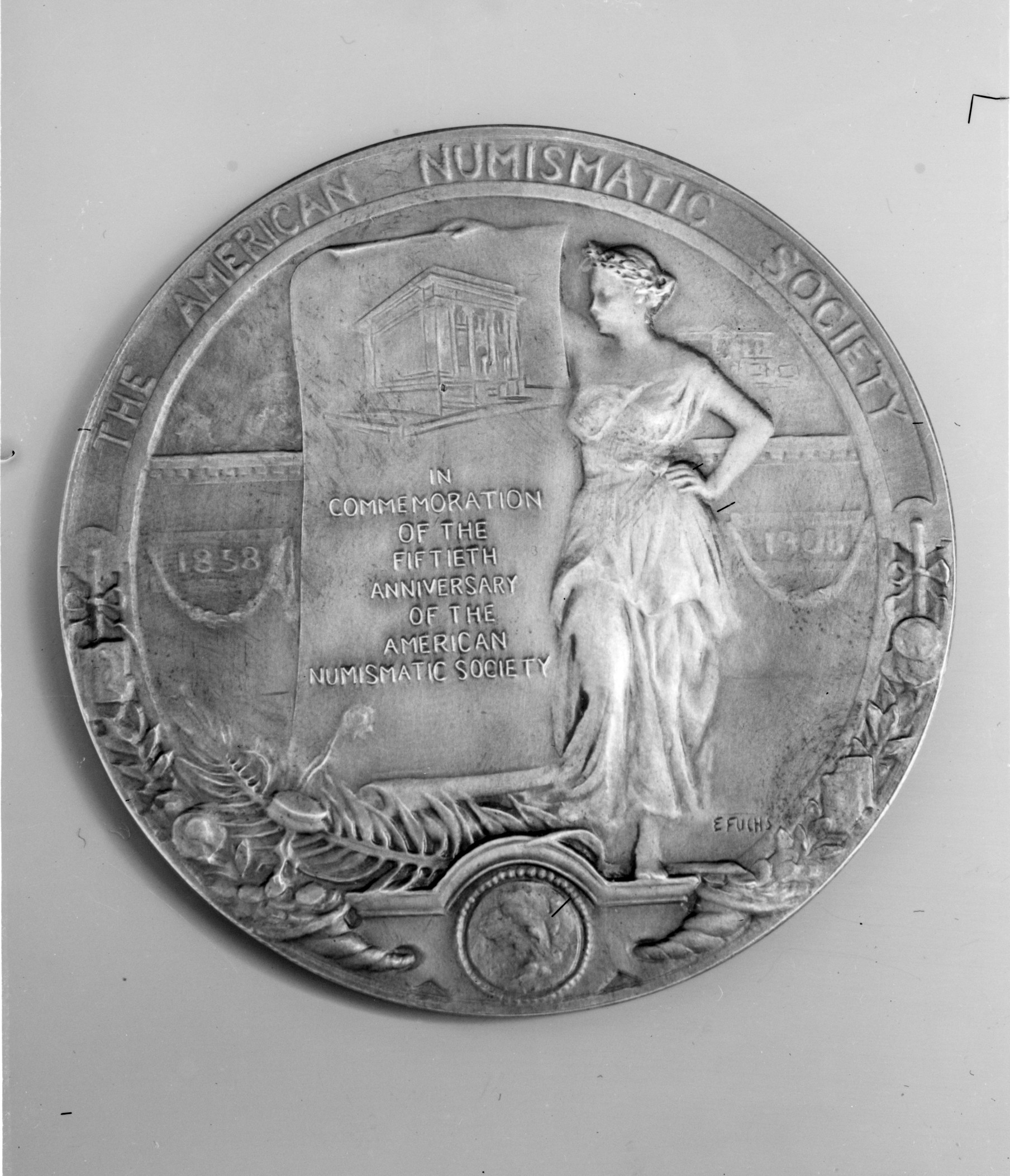
Medallion commemorating the Fiftieth Anniversary of the American Numismatic Society in 1908

The American Numismatic Society is an organization dedicated to the study of coins, currency, medals, tokens, and related objects from all cultures, past and present. The society's headquarters in New York City houses the foremost research collection and library specialized in numismatics in the United States. These resources are used to support research and education in numismatics for the benefit of academic specialists, serious collectors, professional numismatists, and the interested public. It is one of a number of numismatic associations. The ANS is a constituent member of the American Council of Learned Societies, as well as other notable museum and culture umbrella organizations.

=== Mission ===
The ANS is dedicated to advancing the study and public appreciation of coins, currency, medals, orders, decorations, and related objects from cultures worldwide, recognizing them as important historical and artistic artifacts.

=== Location ===
The society and its holdings have been housed in several locations in New York City. The first meetings of the society were hosted in private homes, including at the family home of ANS founding member, Augustus B. Sage in 1856. For the next several decades, the ANS and its collection were maintained in rented spaces at the Cooper Union, the Bible House at Astor Place, Union Dime Savings Bank, among other locations. With the largess of Archer Huntington, who became a member of the ANS in 1899 and its president in 1904, the society moved to Audubon Terrace on West 155th and Broadway, first hosted by the Hispanic Society and later in its on purpose-built space in 1907. In 2003, the society moved into the former Fidelity and Deposit Company building at the corner of Fulton and William Street. In 2008, the ANS moved to its current location is at 75 Varick Street by Canal Street in downtown Manhattan.

In November 2025, the ANS announced it would be moving to an Art Deco-era building on the campus of the Toledo Museum of Art in Toledo, Ohio. The decision to move out of New York City was made as the ANS faced rising rent costs and attracted few visitors.

== Collection ==
The collection of coins, medals, and paper currency consists of over 800,000 objects drawn from all periods and cultures. In many fields, the ANS collections are the most comprehensive anywhere in the world. The collection includes early numismatic items from Ancient Greece and the Roman Republic, and also has a strong representation of coins of American, European, East Asian, South Asian, and Islamic origin. These coinages range from 700 BCE to the present. In addition, the collection contains paper and other non-coinage money, as well as medals and decorations dating back to as early as approximately 4000 BC. The curatorial department of the ANS preserves, studies, and documents the extensive collection. This work includes keeping the collection's database MANTIS up-to-date, which also involves adding images. This online database is a major asset to the study of numismatics because it is one of the largest of its kind and is accessible to everyone.

=== Online Resources ===
The ANS makes a significant amount of numismatic research and resources accessible online, from its own holdings and in collaboration with other institutions. In collaboration with the Institute for the Study of the Ancient World, the ANS created OCRE, the "Online Coins of the Roman Empire." This project aspires to record every published type of Roman Imperial Coinage and link them with examples in major collections published online. The ANS also participates in Nomisma.org, which "is a collaborative project to provide stable digital representations of numismatic concepts according to the principles of Linked Open Data.". Similarly, the Hellenistic Royal Coinages project, HRC, is aiming to do something similar with all coinages from the empire of Alexander the Great and his various successor kingdoms, including the Seleucids in the Near East and the Ptolemies in Egypt.

=== Exhibitions ===
At its headquarters in Manhattan, the ANS has a small exhibition space, which is open to the public. The ANS also loans objects from its collections to other major institutions and exhibitions. While the largest number of objects from the ANS can be found at The Metropolitan Museum of Art, there are exhibitions with ANS objects all over the world.

== Library ==
The library of the ANS houses over 100,000 items and is one of the most comprehensive collections of numismatic literature, including books, periodicals, auction catalogs, manuscripts, photographs, and pamphlets. A special part of the library is the Rare Books Room with its unique collection of antique numismatic literature.

== Publications ==
The ANS is also an active disseminator of research. As the largest non-profit numismatic publishing house in the world, ANS issues books, periodicals, monographs, catalogs, conference papers, and conference proceedings in a variety of series and special issues. Currently the ANS publishes three periodicals: the annual American Journal of Numismatics (1866–1924 and 1989–present), the triannual Colonial Newsletter (1960–present), and the quarterly ANS Magazine (2001–present). Electronic publications are the monthly "ANS eNews" and the "Pocket Change" blog. The ANS also publishes books on coins and medals. Past publications have included the Numismatic Literature journal (1947–2007).

== Awards ==
The ANS gives multiple awards to people contributing to numismatics and the society.

The Huntington Medal Award is conferred annually in honor of Archer M. Huntington, who was an important contributor to the ANS at the beginning of the 20th century. This award recognizes outstanding career contributions to numismatic scholarship. The first such award was conferred to Edward T. Newell in 1918.

The Saltus Medal Award is named after J. Sanford Saltus, who initiated this award in 1913. This award is given to sculptors “for distinguished achievement in the field of the art of the medal.” Though this medal was at first only given to Americans, foreign artists have been eligible recipients of it since 1983. The 2011 award recipient was Portuguese artist João Duarte, and previous winners are on the List of Saltus Award winners.

== Graduate Seminar ==
In 1952, the American Numismatic Society established the Eric P. Newman Graduate Seminar in Numismatics. This training program in numismatics takes place each summer, and many of its alumni are now in academic positions.

== History ==
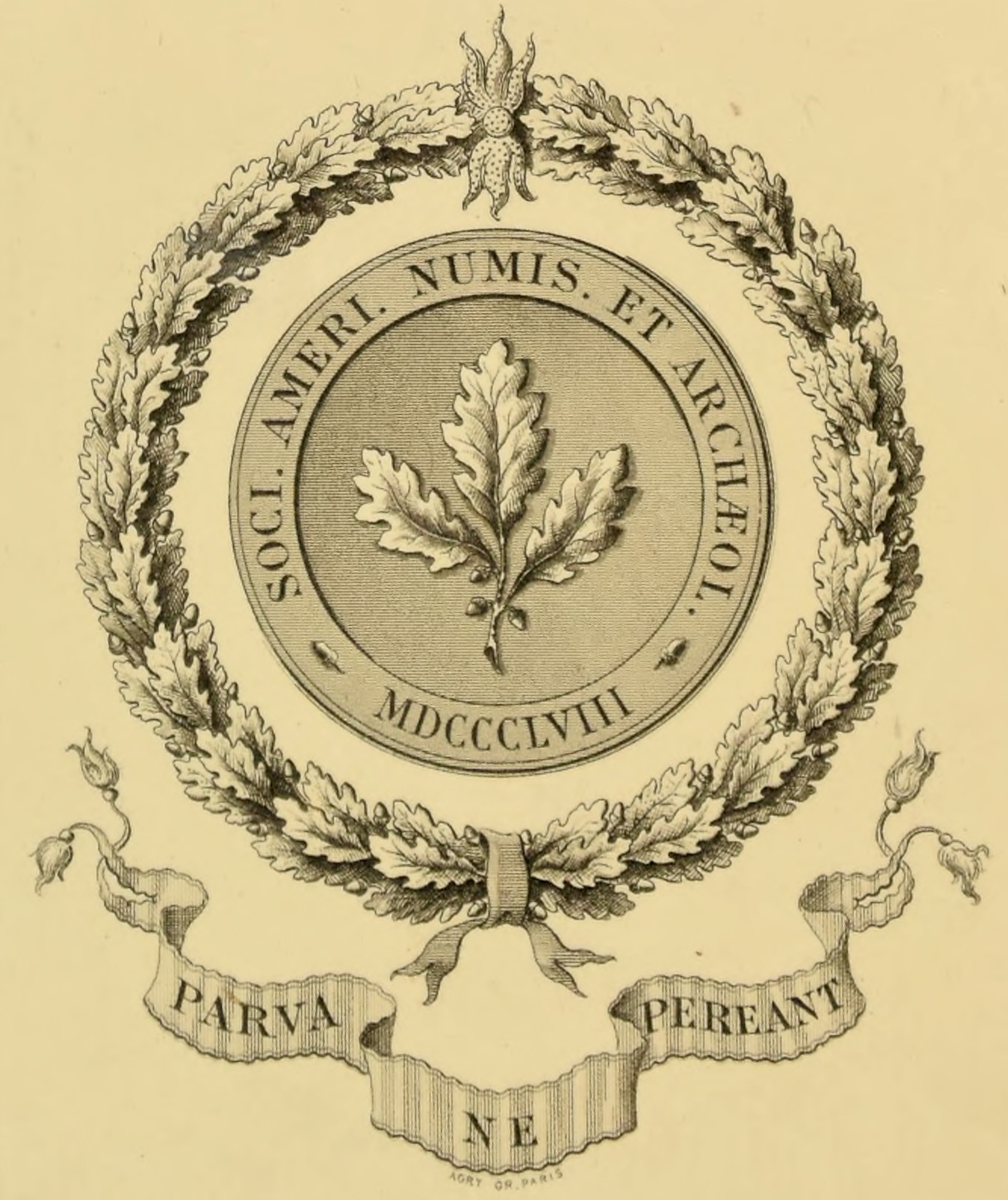
19th century American Numismatic and Archaeology Society bookplate with logo

The ANS was formed by a group of collectors in New York City in 1858, at a time when many learned societies were created. Although the initial meeting of the collectors occurred in March 1858, the society looks back to April 6, 1858, as its date of creation; that was the day on which the fledgling society's first constitution and bylaws were approved by the membership. That same month, the society accessioned its first coin. In 1865, it was incorporated as the American Numismatic and Archaeological Society or ANAS. In 1907, the name was changed back to the original one.

“The founders were Edward Groh, James Oliver, Dr. Isaac H. Gibbs, Henry Whitmore, James D. Foskett, Alfred Boughton, Ezra Hill, Augustus B. Sage, Asher D. Atkinson, M.D., John Cooper Vail, W. H. Morgan, Thomas Dunn English, M.D., LL.D., and Theophilus W. Lawrence. The corporators were Frank H. Norton, Isaac J. Greenwood, John Hannah, James Oliver, F. Augustus Wood, Frank Leathe, Edward Groh, Daniel Parish, Jr., and William Wood Seymour.” Benson Lossing in the History of New York City Volume II wrote in 1884 that “the prime objects of the society are the cultivation of the science of numismatology, the promotion of the study of American archaeology, and the collection of coins and medals and specimens of archaic remains.” Later, ANS changed its mission to focus primarily on all aspects of coins and medals.

Under the leadership of several dynamic, resourceful, and generous presidents, the ANS grew to become a major international center for numismatic research. One of these presidents, Archer M. Huntington, a scion of the family who built the Southern Pacific Railroad and a serious collector, gave the society land at 155th Street and Broadway and contributed toward the construction of the neoclassical building which opened in 1908. In 1929, Huntington underwrote the expansion of the building, which doubled its size. As President of the ANS from 1916 to 1941, Edward T. Newell, a scholar of Greek coins, guided the society toward making its mark worldwide. He also left his enormous personal coin collection to society.

It was in the latter half of the 20th century that the society evolved into the foremost numismatic research institution in the United States. Its cabinet of nearly one million objects ranks with the largest in the world and is an extraordinary resource for students of the humanities. Its unique library of over 100,000 items is the most comprehensive collection of numismatic literature in existence.

The society administers a variety of fellowships and grants designed to promote research in numismatics and encourage the use of the collections.

== Notable members ==
- Agnes Baldwin Brett
- Ernest Babelon
- Harry W. Bass Jr.
- Abram Belskie
- Granville Carter
- Eugene Daub
- Thomas Dunn English
- Roger Curtis Green
- Philip Grierson
- Kenneth W. Harl
- David Hendin
- Robert Hewitt Jr.
- Urban T. Holmes Jr.
- Archer M. Huntington
- Edward Theodore Newell
- Eric P. Newman
- Stephen Hyatt Pell
- Russell Rulau
- William Herbert Sheldon
- Ute Wartenberg

== See also ==
- List of Saltus Award winners
