= Gladys Gunzer =

American sculptor

Gladys Smith Gunzer
- Born: November 12, 1939; North Wilkesboro, North Carolina
- Died: June 13, 2016 (aged 76)
- Occupations: Metallist, sculptor
- Spouse: Richard Sheridan Gunzer

Gladys Smith Gunzer (November 12, 1939 – June 13, 2016) was a noted American metallist and sculptor. She was the first woman chosen to design an official United States presidential inaugural medal.

== Biography ==
Gunzer was born in North Wilkesboro, North Carolina in 1939. She studied fine arts at the Women's College of the University of North Carolina, but left in order to raise her family. She was hired by the Medallic Art Company in 1972 and worked there until 1990, working her way up to senior sculptor and manager of the firm's art department. She then moved to Arizona and worked as a freelance medallic sculptor.

== Notable works ==
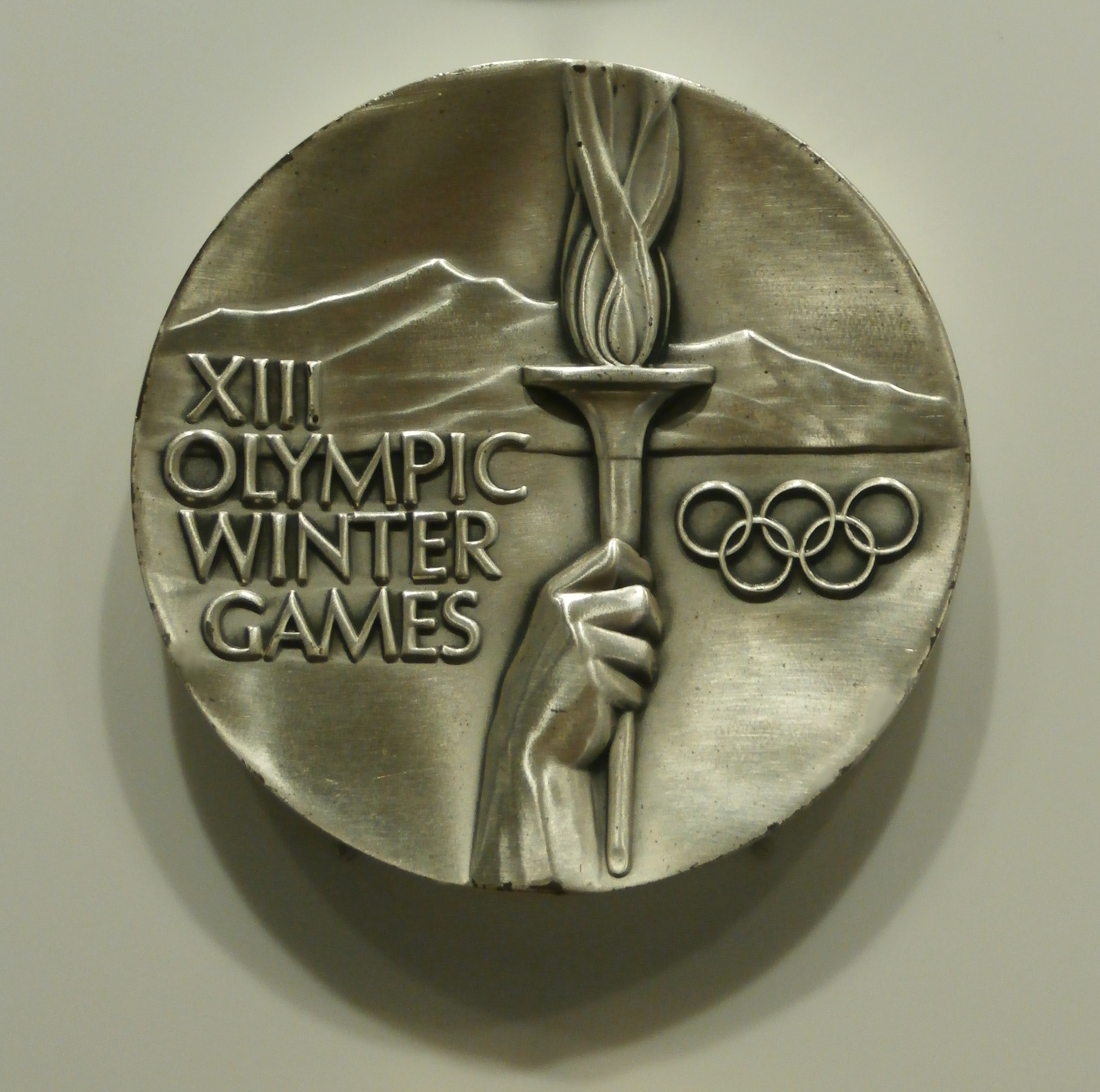
1980 Winter Olympics silver medal

- 1980 Winter Olympics Medals
- 1984 IEEE Centennial Medal
- 2000 IEEE Third Millennial Medal
- 2005 United States Presidential Inaugural Medal
