= Margaret Christian Grigor =

American sculptor and medalist

- Born: March 2, 1912; Forres, Scotland
- Died: December 1, 1981 (aged 69); Steilacoom, Washington, US
- Known for: Sculptor, medalist

Margaret Christian Grigor (March 2, 1912, Forres, Scotland – December 1, 1981, Steilacoom, Washington, US) was a prolific sculptor and medalist, working in metal, wood, stone, plaster and plasteline. Grigor was elected to the National Sculpture Society in 1963. In 1969 she won the Lindsey Morris Prize for best bas-relief from the National Sculpture Society.

She was chosen for important commissions including the Garvan Medal for women chemists, the Alaska and Hawaii Medal for the 71st issue of the Society of Medalists, and the 75th Anniversary Medal of the National Sculpture Society. She also created a medal of Alexander Hamilton for the Hall of Fame for Great Americans in New York City, and an official Bicentennial medal.

== Life ==
Margaret Christian Grigor was born on March 2, 1912, in Forres, Scotland. Her father was William W. Grigor. Her parents were American and returned with her to the United States when she was a child.

Grigor studied at Mount Holyoke College, earning her B.A. in history of art in 1934. She then studied art with Walker Hancock and Albert Laessle at the Pennsylvania Academy of the Fine Arts (PAFA).

During World War II, Grigor served in the Women's Army Corps. After the war, she and her mother and a distant cousin and fellow WAC, Edna Hudnell, lived together in New York City for ten years. They then moved to Steilacoom, Washington on the coast of Puget Sound for health reasons.

== Career ==
Grigor was a sculptor in metal, wood and stone and a prolific medalist. Several of her medals have received particular attention. She exhibited at the Annual Exhibition of the Pennsylvania Academy of the Fine Arts. Speaking of her work, she once stated, "I sculpt so that I can hold my head up high. People don't have to like what I do, but they recognize me as a sculptor. That is what I am."

=== Garvan-Olin Medal ===
In 1937, Grigor created the Garvan-Olin Medal for the American Chemical Society. That a woman sculptor was selected to create the medal was particularly fitting, since it is recognizes distinguished women in the field of chemistry. The design features a torch of knowledge on one side, with the recipient's name, and a cauldron, caduceus, and industrial buildings on the obverse. The resulting medal is considered one of her best and most original designs.

=== Alaska and Hawaii ===
Grigor's Medal for Alaska and Hawaii was chosen by the Society of Medalists for its 71st issue, in 1965. For this medal, Grigor chose to celebrate the addition of two new cultures to the United States. One side of the medal shows two Eskimo men ice-fishing and cutting blocks of ice, while the other side shows two Native Hawaiians women working, grinding poi and mending a woven mat. 909 copies were struck.

"Since it will be many years before either of our newest states, Alaska and Hawaii, will be able to celebrate an anniversary of statehood... I wanted to celebrate their addition to the Union. To me the most interesting characteristic of both new states is that each has brought into our country a new and different culture and way of life." Margaret Grigor

=== 75th Anniversary Medal, National Sculpture Society ===
Grigor was selected to create the reverse of the 75th Anniversary Medal of the National Sculpture Society (NSS) in 1968. The front was created by Thomas Gaetano LoMedico. The reverse shows sculptor's tools being passed from one hand to another, in front of a rough pylon to be sculpted, with the motto "To further the sculptural heritage." The medal was struck by Medallic Art Company (1900–1990) at the Danbury Mint, and distributed by the National Sculpture Society.

=== United States Bicentennial contest ===
Grigor competed in a national contest, conducted by the Treasury Department and judged by the National Sculpture Society for the United States Bicentennial. After being selected, Grigor created an official Bicentennial medal for the United States Mint, portraying Paul Revere's ride and the battles at Lexington and Concord.

== Awards and honors ==
- 1972, Alumnae Association award, Mount Holyoke College
- 1969, Lindsey Morris Prize, National Sculpture Society
- 1963, elected member, National Sculpture Society
- 1939, Stimson Prize
- 1937, Cresson Traveling Scholarship, Pennsylvania Academy of Fine Arts
