= Robert Hewitt Jr. =

Robert Hewitt Jr. was a successful real estate investor in Manhattan, New York, and a notable numismatist. Hewitt began collecting coins as a young man while serving a mercantile apprenticeship and compiled a comprehensive Abraham Lincoln medal collection considered by numismatists as one of the greatest of its kind. In 1908, he endeavored for the creation of a medal to commemorate the centennial birth of Abraham Lincoln. He commissioned esteemed French-American sculptor and medallist Jules Edouard Roiné for the design, "which is described as the most beautiful representation of Lincoln's features that has as yet been made."

In 1918, Mrs. Hewitt donated the Robert Hewitt Lincoln collection to the U.S. National Museum (Smithsonian Institution). At the time of donation, the U.S. National Museum reported that the collection included “1,200 specimens of medallic souvenirs of President Lincoln, and includes medallions, plaques, medals, medalets, coins, tokens, and…campaign” items. Hewitt’s extensive collection of Lincolniana provided both an important historical and artistic view of Lincoln.

In addition, Hewitt founded the important numismatic group the Circle of Friends of the Medallion in 1909 with other medal enthusiasts and produced the first privately created medal series in America. Also, Hewitt served as the Corresponding Secretary of the American Numismatic and Archaeological Society (currently the American Numismatic Society) in 1868-69 and the Second Vice President in 1880-84.
