= Nathaniel Choate =

American painter

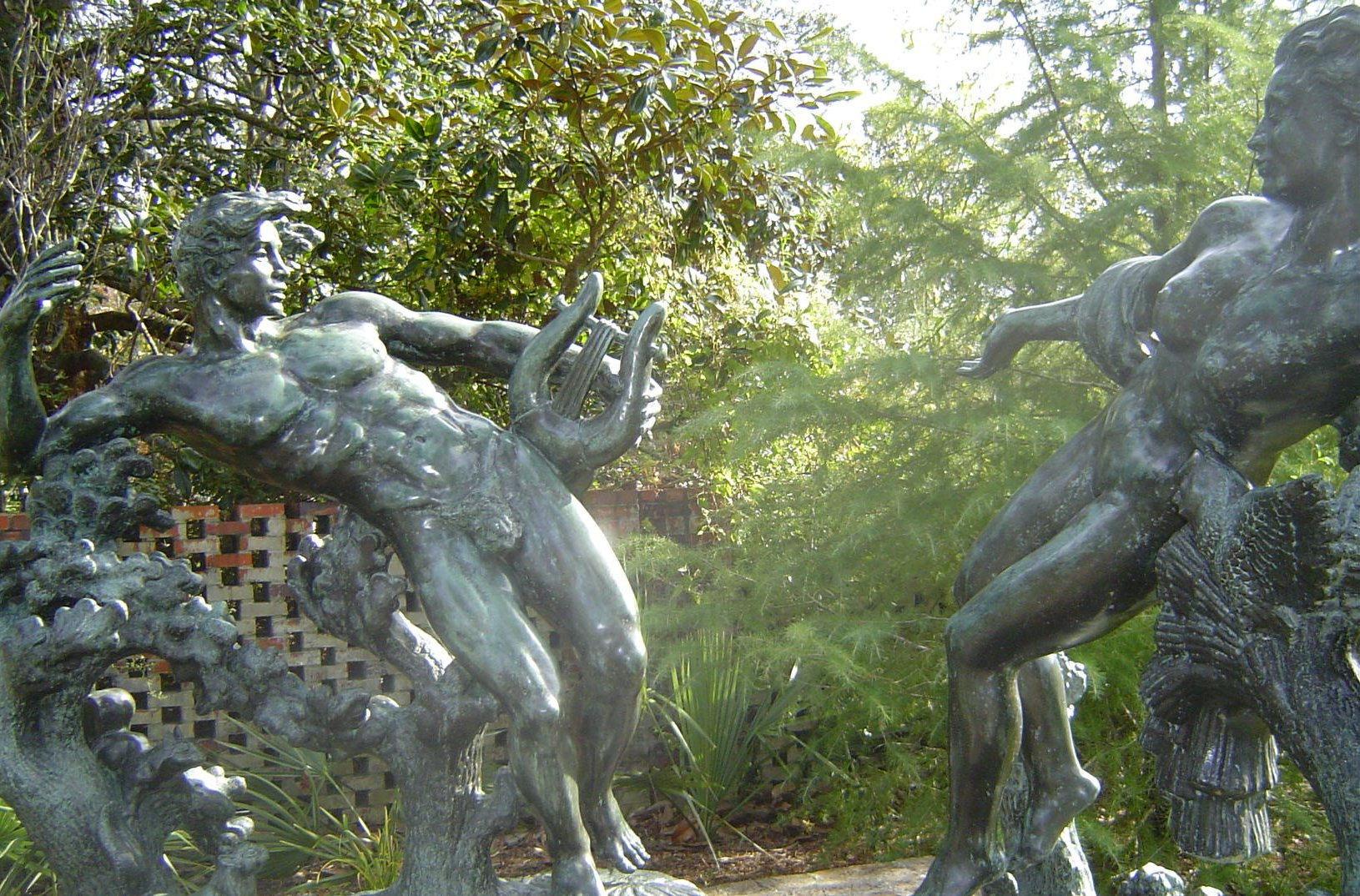
Orpheus and Eurydice by Nathaniel Choate

Nathaniel Choate (1899-1965) was an American painter and sculptor who served as vice president of the National Sculpture Society. Choate worked with varied materials, including aluminum, bronze, marble, and onyx. He regularly showcased his work at the National Academy of Design in New York City and the Pennsylvania Academy of the Fine Arts in Philadelphia, Pennsylvania. The National Academy of Design elected him an affiliated academician in 1955. In 1961, the Society of Medalists issued their 64th medallion in his honor. Choate also possessed the National Advertising Award from the Outdoor Advertising Association of America.

== Early life and education ==
Choate was born in Southboro, Massachusetts, on December 26, 1899, to Edward Carlisle and Gertrude Mabel (McNeil) Choate. In 1918, he graduated from Morristown School, now Morristown-Beard School, in Morristown, New Jersey. Choate then received his bachelor's degree from Harvard University in Cambridge, Massachusetts, in 1922. While at Harvard, he studied art history under Paul J. Sachs and Edward W. Forbes and painting under Denman Ross.

During his studies, Choate served as an officer of the Harvard Lampoon, a humor magazine. He also served as president of the Morristown School Club, an affinity group for graduates of the school attending Harvard. In 1921, Harvard awarded Choate the Bowers Prize in fine arts for the "best drawing, made directly from nature, by an undergraduate in any of the courses in Fine Arts". The prize carried an honorarium of $25 (a sizable amount for the time). In 1937, Choate designed the medal of Harvard's Signet Society, which they present to alumni who have made significant achievements in the arts.

After graduating from Harvard, Choate studied figure painting at the Académie Julian in Paris. He also took classes at the Académie de la Grande Chaumiere and the Académie Delécluse. After visiting Greece, Choate shifted his main artwork interest from portraits and murals to sculpture. He returned to the Boston area to study sculpture under Harvard professor John A. Wilson. While residing in Boston, Choate served as the art editor of The Youth's Companion, a children's magazine, until 1927. Five years later, Choate spent time traveling Morocco and the Sudan. This experience influenced much of his later artwork.

== Career ==
In 1937, the Architectural League of New York awarded Choate their gold medal for design and craftsmanship in stone carving. Conferring the award, the society noted his "excellence in the craft of stone carving and design". The honor earned Choate sculpting commissions to craft a bas-relief for the Federal Building's doors at the 1939 World's Fair in Flushing Meadows and a relief for the U.S. Post Office in Pitman, New Jersey. A New Deal grant from the U.S. Treasury Department's Section of Fine Arts funded his design of the post office's "Four Winds" relief.

In 1938, Choate taught at the Pennsylvania Academy of the Fine Arts' Summer School in Chester Springs, Pennsylvania. He also taught students privately.

Choate created emblems of the Four Evangelists for the Luxembourg American Cemetery and Memorial run by the American Battle Monuments Commission. He sculpted a bust of Massachusetts Governor Robert F. Bradford and crafted a group of fish in aluminum for the SS United States's main lounge. Built in 1952, the luxury ocean liner sought to capture the trans-Atlantic speed record. In 1964, Choate designed a medal of Supreme Court Justice Joseph Story for a series by the Hall of Fame for Great Americans in New York. He also crafted the bronze medallion that decorated the headquarters of the Chemical Bank New York Trust Company (now JPMorgan Chase) at 34th Street in Manhattan.

=== Brooklyn mural ===
In 1962, Choate and ceramicist Francis Von Tury created a mural for New York City Community College, which now operates as the New York City College of Technology (City Tech). The 33 foot by 17 foot mosaic portrayed six figures to symbolize the school's activities in health, athletics, recreation, competition, drama, and music. Choate's mural stood for 53 years until City Tech razed the building it adorned in 2013 to construct a new educational complex. Seeking to save the mural, activist Robert Holden from Queens and his colleagues spearheaded a campaign in the summer of 2013. After Holden contacted the Board of Trustees of the City University of New York system, they elected to preserve the mural in storage.

=== Greenwich Village home ===
Choate owned a four-story home at 237 West West Fourth Street in Greenwich Village, a historical hub of artistic creativity. While living there, he painted murals of Haiti and Trinidad for the Calypso at 146 Macdougal Street, a restaurant that served Caribbean cuisine. In 1957, Choate sold the property to realtors Lloyd Hauser and J. P. Sloane. They planned to house a group of four young sculptors.

=== Collections displaying Choate's artwork ===
Public collections in many locations around the U.S. display Choate's work, including:

- Brookgreen Gardens, Murrells Inlet, South Carolina
- The Fogg Art Museum at Harvard University, Cambridge, MA
- The Honolulu Museum of Art, Honolulu, HI
- The Muskegon Museum of Art, Muskegon, MI
- The National Academy of Design, New York, NY
- The Pennsylvania Academy of the Fine Arts, Philadelphia, PA
- Indiana University, Bloomington, IN
