= IEEE Centennial Medal =

IEEE Centennial Medal

The IEEE Centennial Medal was a medal minted and awarded in 1984 to persons deserving of special recognition for extraordinary achievement to celebrate the Centennial of the founding of the Institute of Electrical and Electronics Engineers (IEEE) in 1884. The medal was designed by sculptor Gladys Gunzer.

The medal obverse shows 1884 in calligraphic writing and 1984 in an LCD font. The medal reverse shows a map of the world and the name of the recipient. The number of medals minted was 1984, the same as the year of the centenary.
