= Circle of Friends of the Medallion =

Circle of Friends of the Medallion was formed by Charles DeKay, Robert Hewitt, Jr., and the French-American trio of Jules Edouard Roiné with brothers Felix and Henri Weil, all living in New York City. DeKay, "a newspaperman and art lover" provided the contacts to form the Circle of Friends of the Medallion, often referred to as the Circle of Friends, while Hewitt, "a Manhattan real estate investor" provided the funds for its development. Jules Edouard Roiné and Felix Weil ran the Roiné, Weil and Company (1908-1916) which they collaborated with Henri. Upon Roiné's passing in 1916, Felix and Henri Weil operated the Medallic Art Company of New York. The three men, via both companies, made the 1st, 2nd and 12th medals in the series. Joseph K. Davison & Sons of Philadelphia struck the other medals.

The Circle of Friends issued a total of twelve medals from 1909 to 1915. The first was the Hudson-Fulton Medal, commissioned to the Medallic Art Company. Numismatists estimate that the Circle of Friends issued "no more than 500 of any" medal in the series and each was presented in "tan cloth books." De Kay wrote the articles that accompanied the medals. The medals were not offered for public sale. Instead, they were issued to a small group of collectors that formed the Circle of Friends.

The Circle of Friends commissioned leading medalists of the time to create the series, with themes commemorating significant events, places or people. A few of the medals broke from traditional design by using oblong and oval edge shapes. The Circle of Friends consisted of approximately 400 members, including several prominent individuals such as "inventor Alexander Graham Bell, financier J. Pierpont Morgan, U.S. Mint Director A. Piatt Andrew, two U.S. senators, well-known coin dealer Wayte Raymond and sculptors Flanagan, Brenner and Bela Lyon Pratt."

Although the Circle of Friends only existed for a few years, it significantly impacted exonumia in two ways. Firstly, private collectors designed and executed a medal series for the first time in America. This provided a new form of expression for American artists using American themes and it boosted patron involvement in medallic art. Secondly, the Circle of Friends laid the groundwork for future medallic endeavors in America and increased the experience base of important individuals and organizations in the field, such as the Medallic Art Company. Later, the Medallic Art Company struck the prestigious series produced by The Society of Medalists.

== Medals of the Circle of Friends of the Medallion, 1909-1915 ==
- Number 1. Hudson-Fulton Celebration by John Flanagan (1909)
- Number 2. Happiness of Home and Hearth by Isidore Konti (1910)
- Number 3. Saint Brendan the Navigator by John Mowbray-Clarke (1911)
- Number 4. Motherhood by Victor D. Brenner (1911)
- Number 5. Marquis de Lafayette by Jules-Édouard Roiné (1911)
- Number 6. Charles Dickens by John Severinus Conway (1912)
- Number 7. Abdul Baha by Louis Potter (1912)
- Number 8. The Ocean by Sigurd Neandross (1913)
- Number 9. John Charles Frémont the Pathfinder by René Théophile de Quélin (1913)
- Number 10. Anglo-American Peace Centennial by John Mowbray-Clarke (1914)
- Number 11. New Netherland Tercentenary by Paul Manship (1914)
- Number 12. Blessed Joan of Arc by Allan George Newman (1915)
