= Frank Hagel =

American painter (1933–2024)

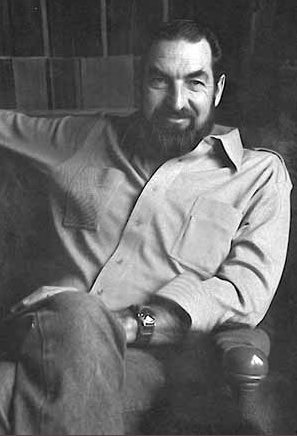
- Hagel, c. 1975
- Born: Frank D. Hagel; December 20, 1933; Kalispell, Montana, U.S.
- Died: October 7, 2024 (aged 90); Kalispell, Montana, U.S.
- Known for: Painting, sculpture
- Notable work: Trapper with Bull Boat (2010)
- Movement: Realism, Impressionism
- Spouses: Ethel I. Houston (m. 1954–1967): Rita Hagel
- Patrons: U.S. State Department; Raymond James Financial; Shakespeare; Dow Chemical Company
- Website: Official website

Frank D. Hagel (December 20, 1933 – October 7, 2024) was an American realist and impressionist painter and sculptor. His artwork depicts Native Americans, trappers, and wildlife of the western American frontier.

For the Lewis and Clark Bicentennial, he completed a corporate commission of a dozen paintings, three of which appeared in Smithsonian magazine's coverage of the Expedition. His paintings, known for their authenticity, are found in private as well as corporate art collections across the country and some have been selected for display by the U.S. State Department in American embassies abroad.

== Early life ==
Hagel was born on December 20, 1933, in Kalispell, Montana, the son of Frederick A. Hagel and Winona Hagel (née Popham). Hagel's father, who was originally from Salmon, Idaho, worked as a sawyer in the white pine forests of Montana and Idaho and later worked for the U.S. Forest Service and opened up a tanning business specializing in white buckskins in Kalispell in 1929. The tannery—which is still in operation today—has been operated by Hagel's son Michael since 1976. As a young man Frank worked in the tannery and also engaged in ranching, logging, and construction. After serving in the U.S. Navy (1952–55) during the Korean War, Hagel used the G.I. Bill and attended the Art Center College of Design in Los Angeles, California, graduating in 1959 after studying illustration.

In May 1954, Hagel married Kalispell native Ethel Irene Houston who would die young at age 31 on November 28, 1967, in Ferndale, Michigan, due to a brain tumor. Born to the couple were three sons: Scott, Michael, and Jack.

== Career ==
After college graduation Hagel moved to Detroit, Michigan, where from 1959 to 1970 he worked as a commercial artist for three Detroit art studios and produced illustrations for all major Detroit ad agencies and the big three auto manufacturers. From 1959–61 he worked for Allied Artists, was at Lebeau Studios, Inc. from 1962–64, and thereafter worked for Graphic Productions, Inc., all of Detroit. In addition to the auto manufacturers, Hagel's work was commissioned by Shakespeare (a manufacturer of fishing rods) and Dow Chemical Company, among others. In 1970 he moved back to his hometown of Kalispell. Hagel’s work is frequently juried into prominent western art shows including the C. M. Russell Museum art auction in Great Falls, Montana, where he has been exhibiting for a number of years.

His paintings, known for their authenticity, are found in private as well as corporate art collections across the country. Some of his work has been displayed by the U.S. State Department in American embassies abroad.

On January 31, 1977, Hagel had a one-man show at the First Security Bank in Kalispell. At the time it was believed to be the largest collection of Hagel paintings ever assembled.

=== Medal sculpture ===
In August 1971, Joseph B. Hartzog, Jr., director of the National Park Service, awarded a contract to the Kalispell firm of Roche Jaune Inc. to produce a series of 37 medals, called the “National Parks Centennial Series”, that depict a scene in each of America's national parks. The medals were struck by the Medallic Art Company of New York City. At the time, Hagel was serving as the vice president of Roche Jaune Inc. In 1974–75 he completed a series of five medals for the Montana Bicentennial and in 1989 completed a Montana statehood centennial medal.

=== Painting ===
While involved in sculpting medals and doing corporate illustration work early in his career, the bulk of his lifetime work has been in painting where he specializes in works depicting genre scenes of American Indians—particularly those from the Pacific Northwest—as well as trappers and wildlife. A large number of his paintings feature the Piegan Blackfeet tribe. His Trapper with Bull Boat (2010), a 30x40 inch oil on canvas, sold in 2010 for $14,040 at the Coeur d'Alene Art Auction.

== Personal life and death ==
Hagel was the father of three sons: Scott, Michael, and Jack. His hobbies included bird hunting and trout fishing, and he was an avid golfer as a member of Buffalo Hill Golf Club.

Hagel resided in Kalispell, where he died on October 7, 2024, at the age of 90.
