= Society of Medalists =

The Society of Medalists was established in 1930 in the United States to encourage the medallic work of superior sculptors, and to make their creations available to the public. The Society of Medalists was the longest running art medal collector's organization in the United States and released 129 regular issues on a twice yearly basis from 1930 to 1995, as well as special issues marking the Society's 20th, 40th, and 50th anniversaries and the United States Bicentennial in 1976. An unreleased 130th issue was struck in 2018. Much of the inspiration for the Society came from the earlier Circle of Friends of the Medallion, which also issued medals on a semi-annual basis from 1908 to 1915. All issues of the Society were struck by the Medallic Art Company, originally located in New York City

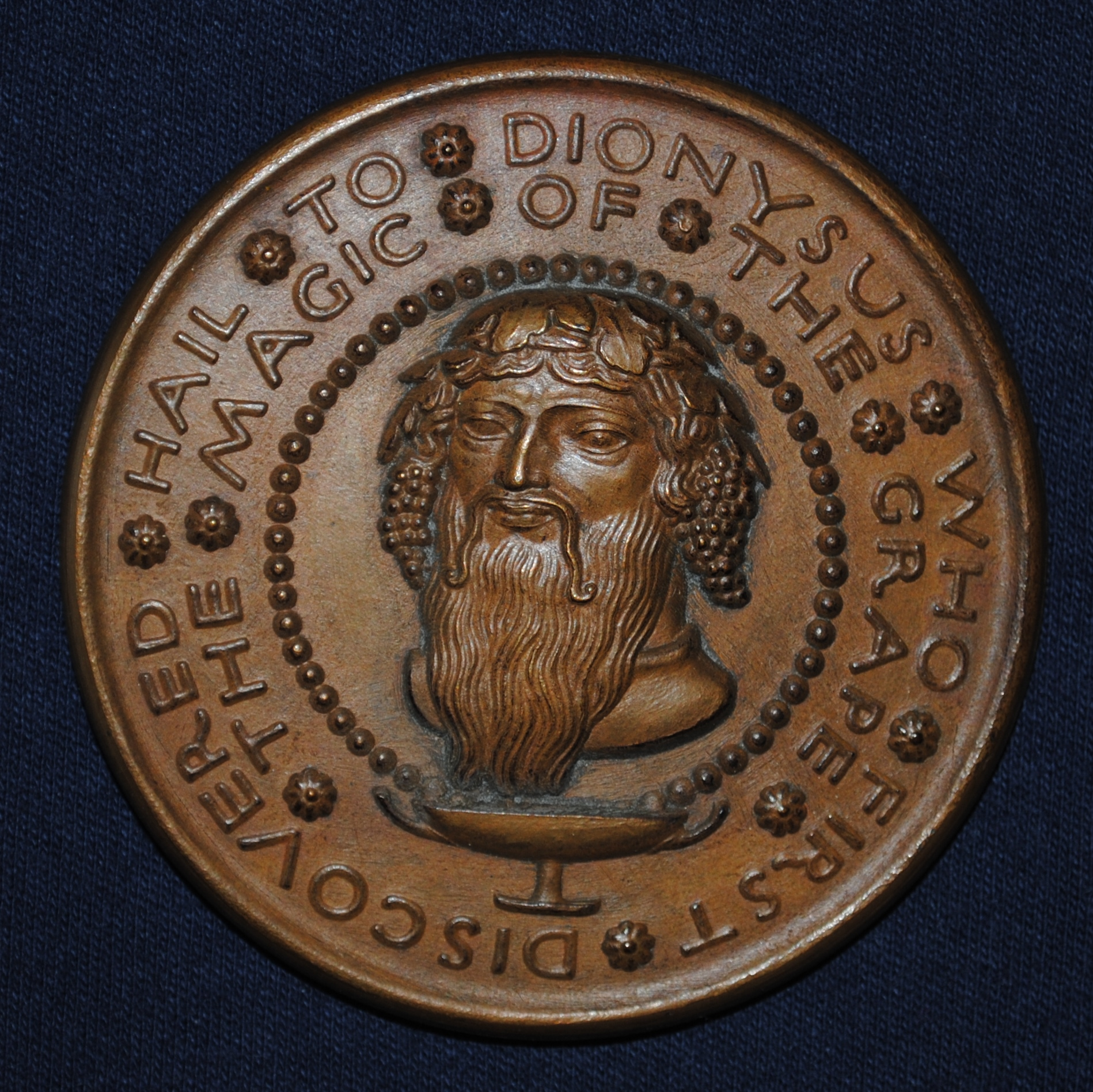
Society of Medalists Issue 2, Dionysus and Satyrs Treading Grapes, by Paul Manship. 1930 bronze.

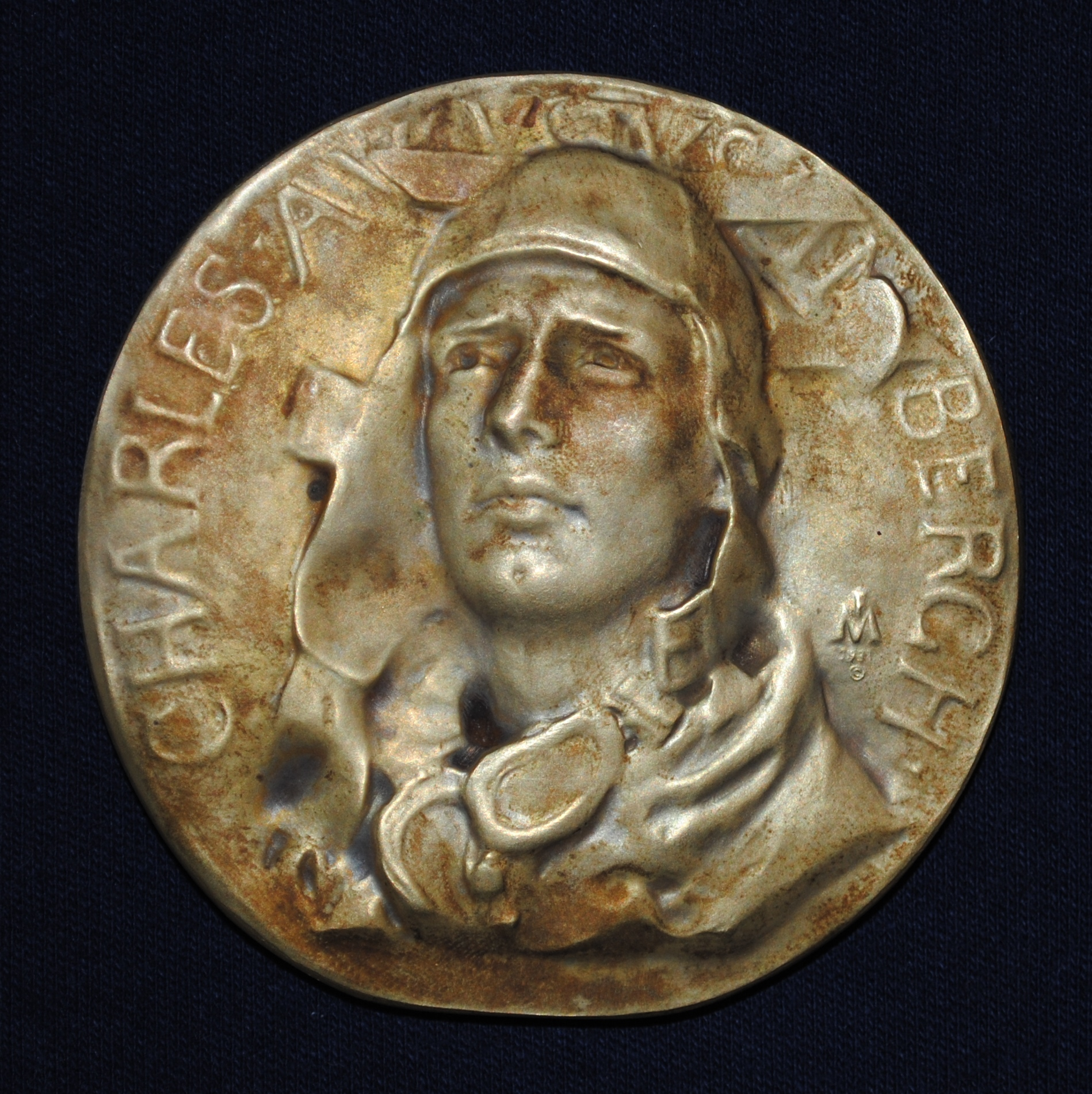
Society of Medalists Issue 4, Charles A. Lindbergh Lone Eagle Allegory, by Frederick MacMonnies. 1931 bronze with gold patina.

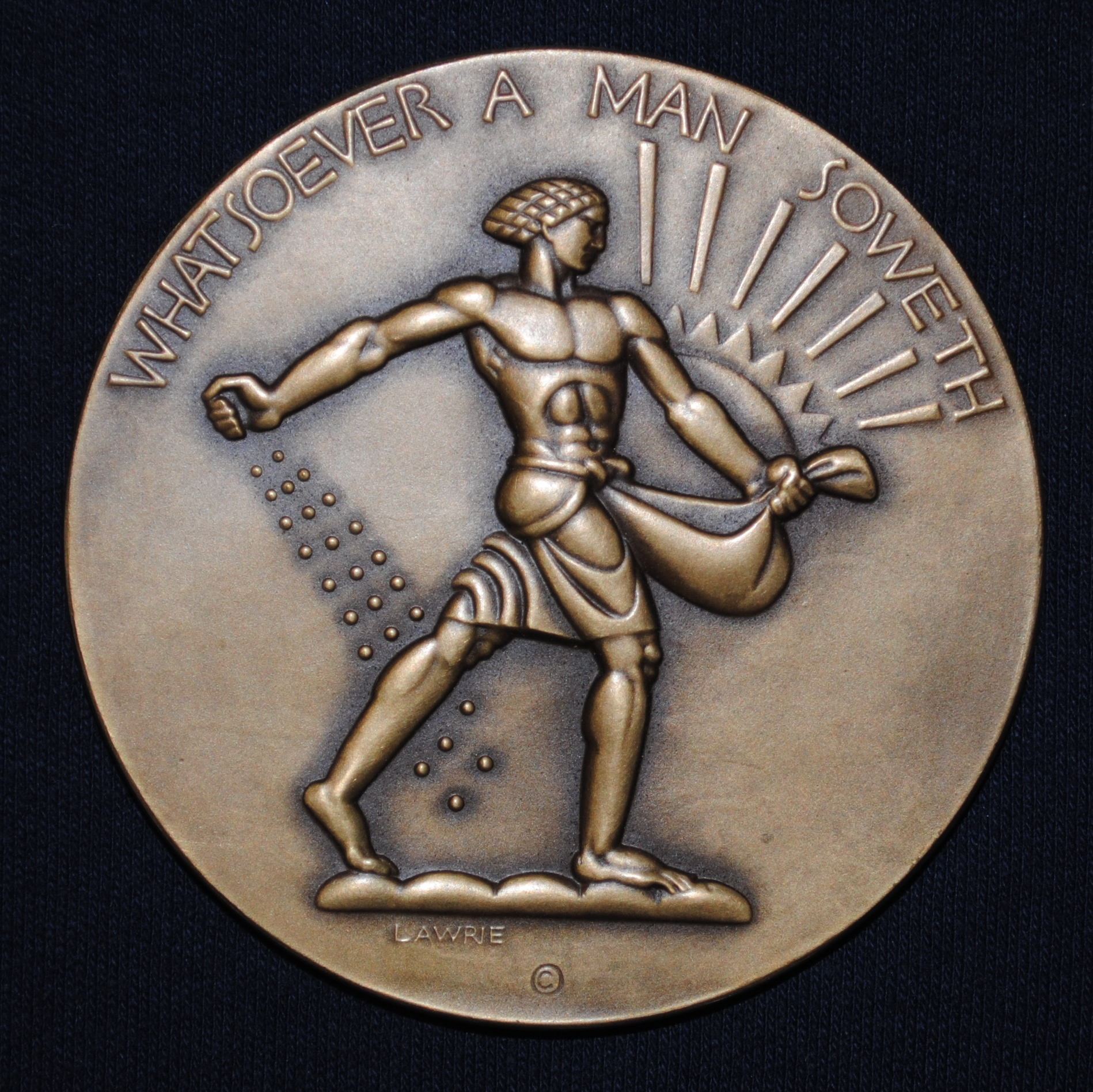
Society of Medalists Issue 5, Whatsoever a Man Soweth That Shall He Also Reap, by Lee Lawrie. 1932 bronze

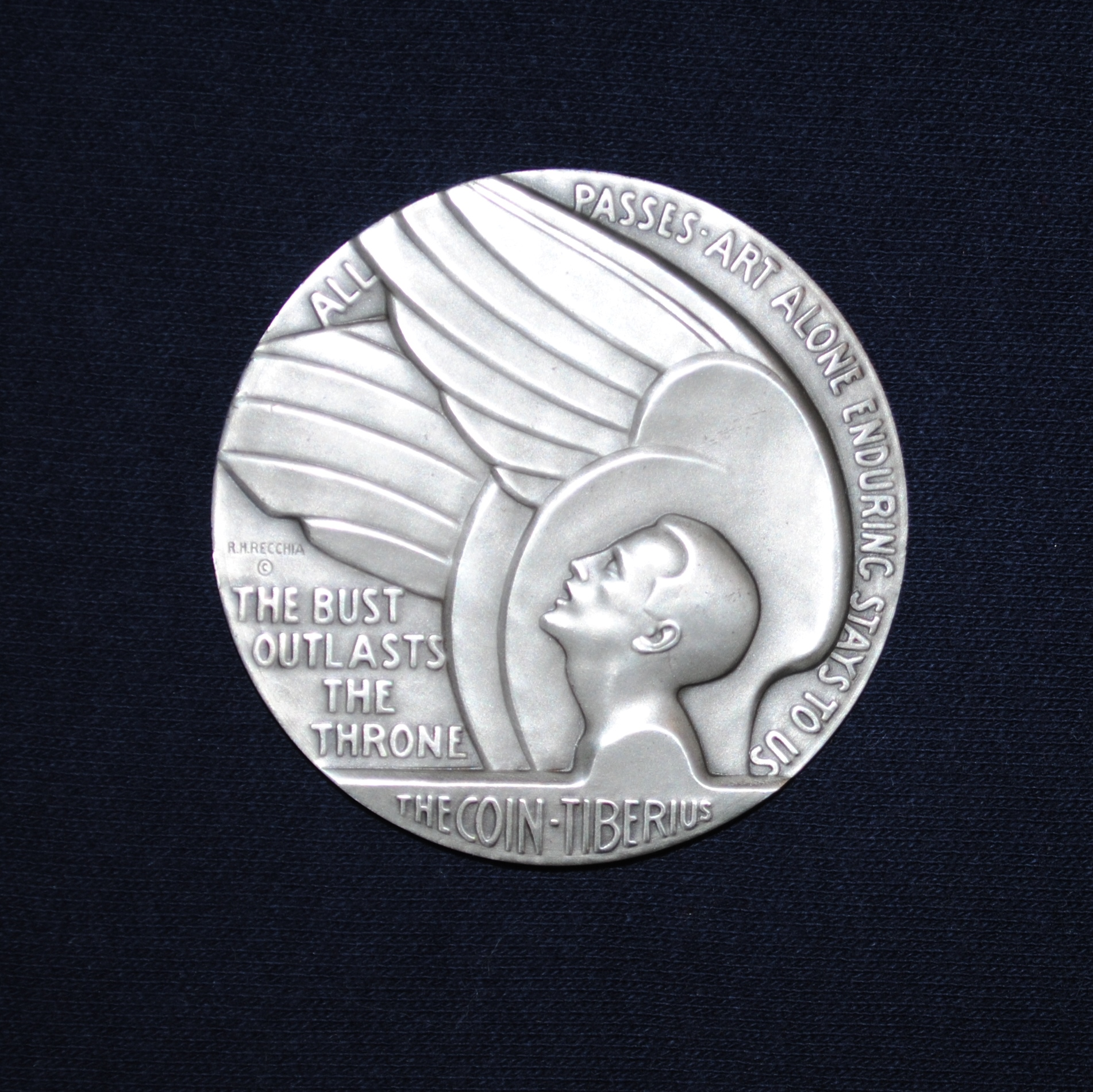
Society of Medalists Issue 29, Inspiration Aspiration, by Richard Recchia. 1944 silver

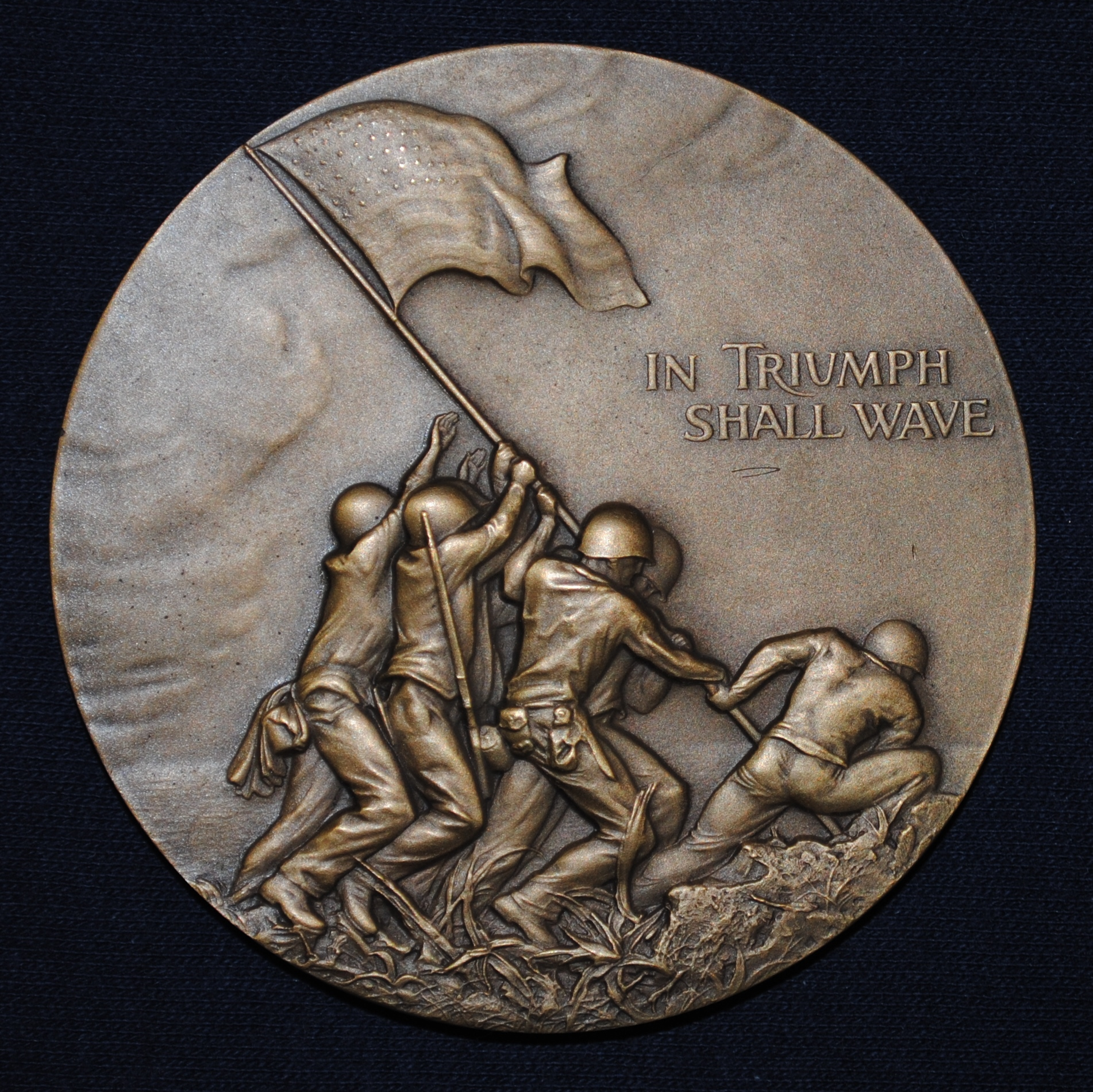
Society of Medalists Issue 31, Flag Raising on Iwo Jima and For Conquer We Must

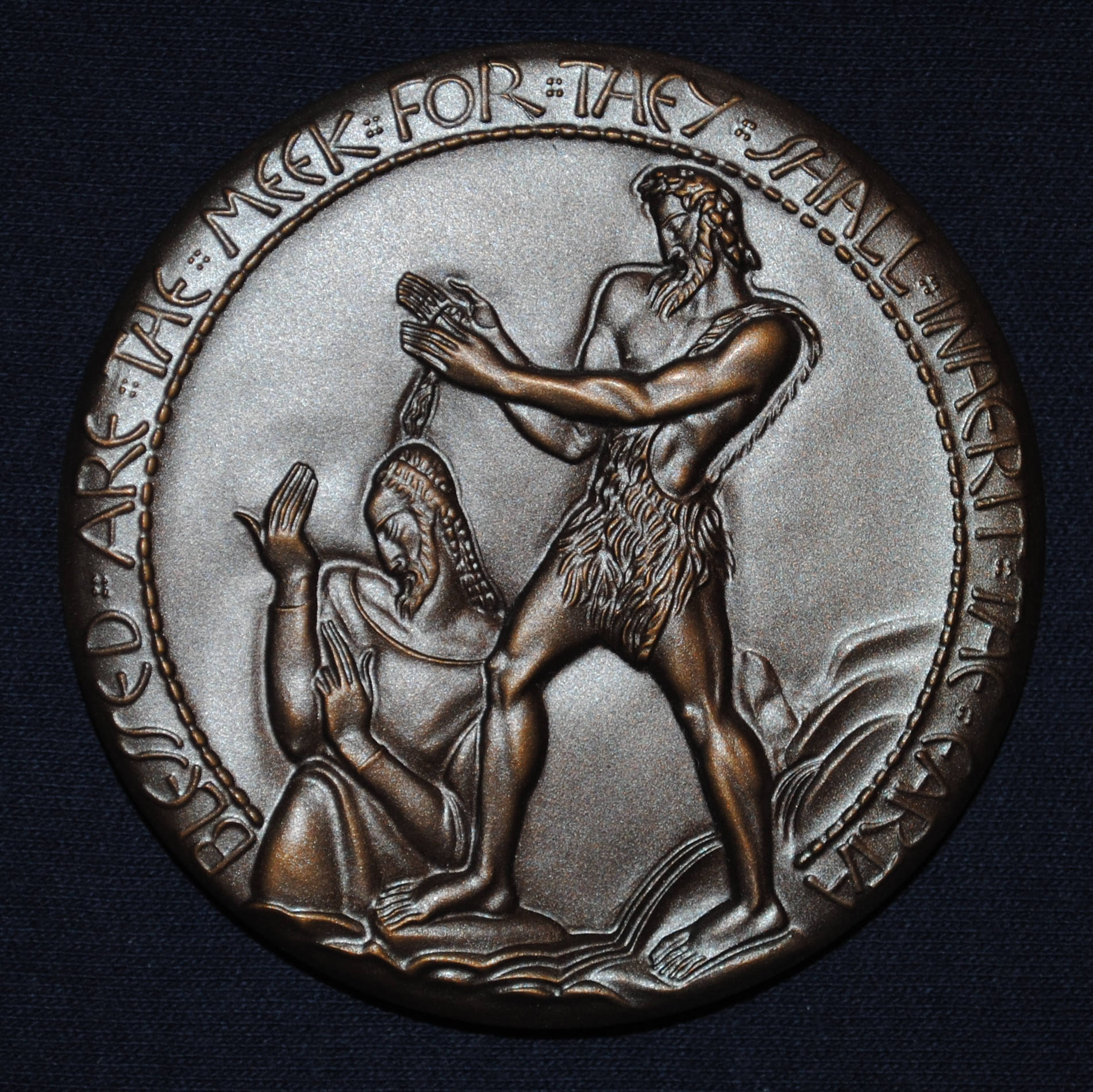
Society of Medalists Issue 37, John the Baptist and Salome

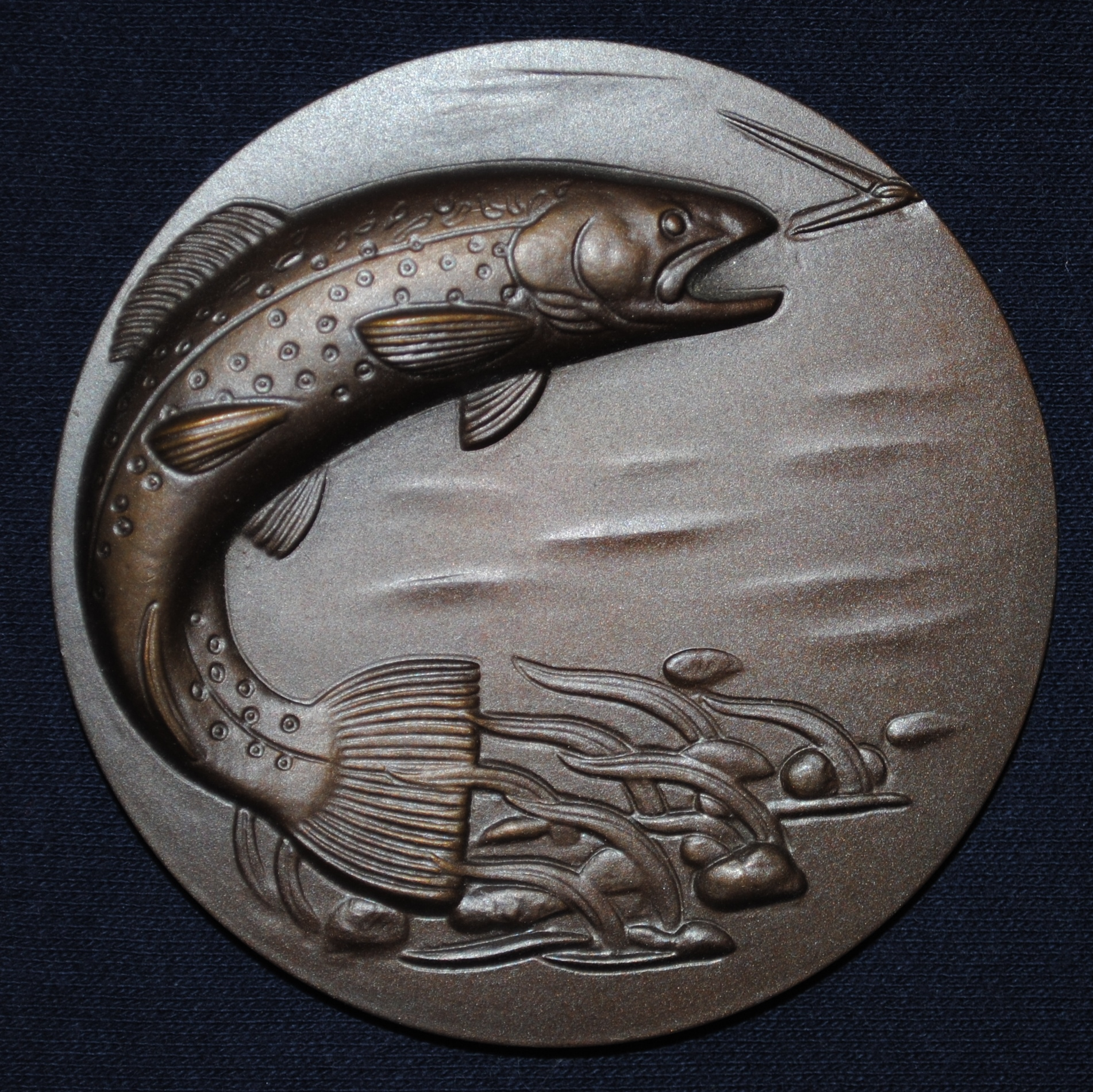
Society of Medalists Issue 47, Fish and Dry Fish Lure

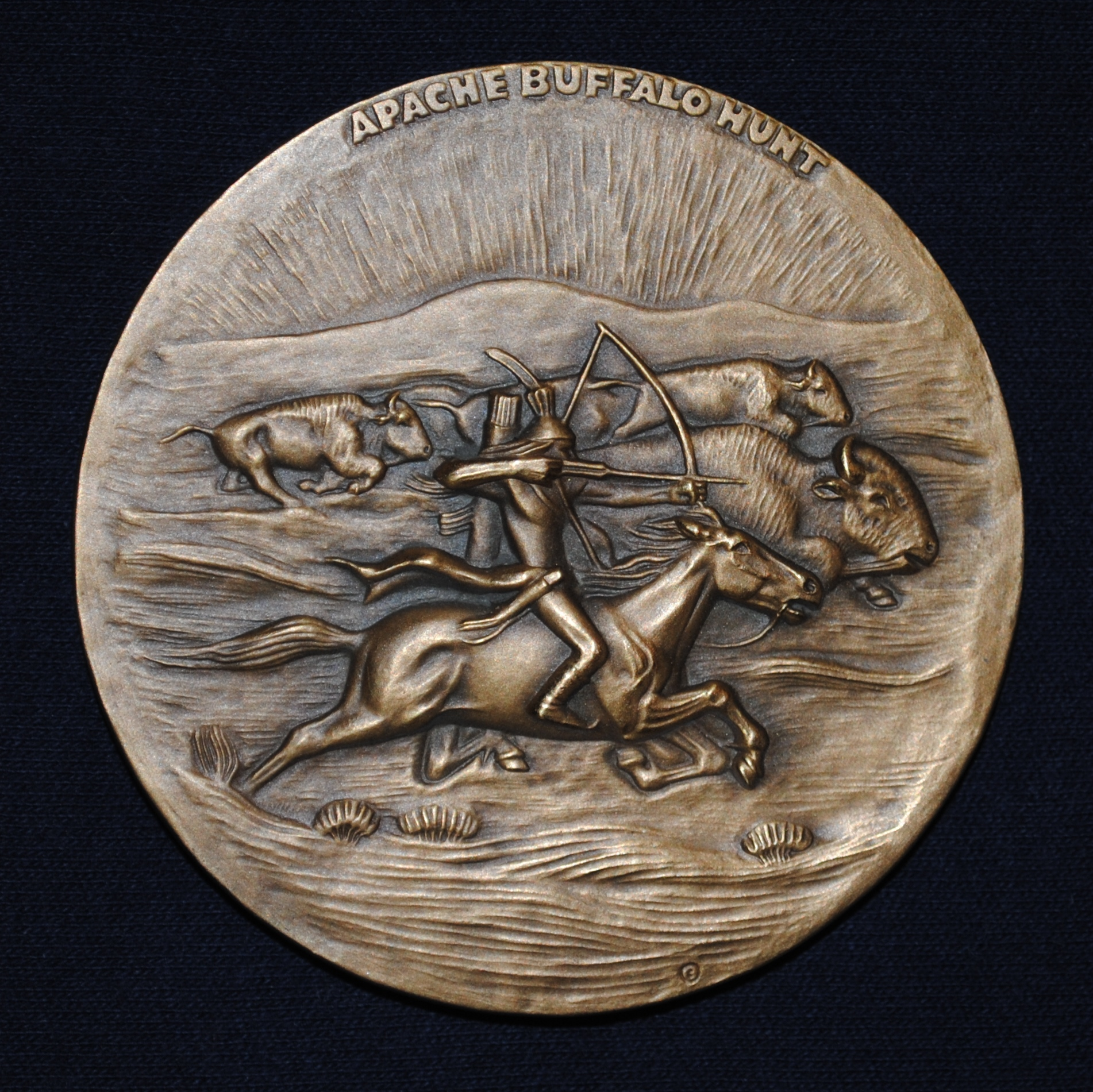
Society of Medalists Issue 59, Apache Fire Dancer and Buffalo Hunt

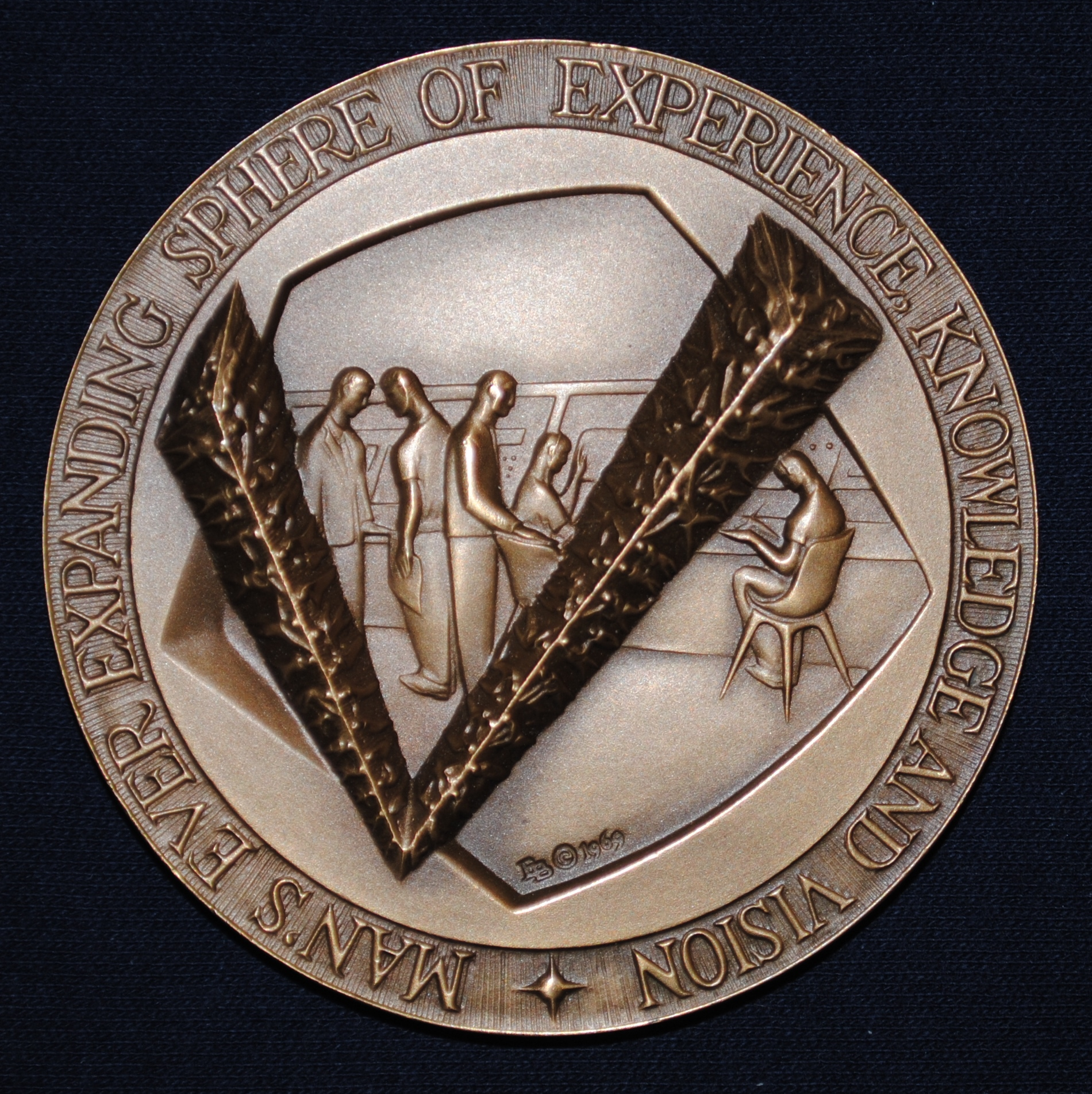
Society of Medalists Issue 80, Space Control Room and Astronaut on Moon

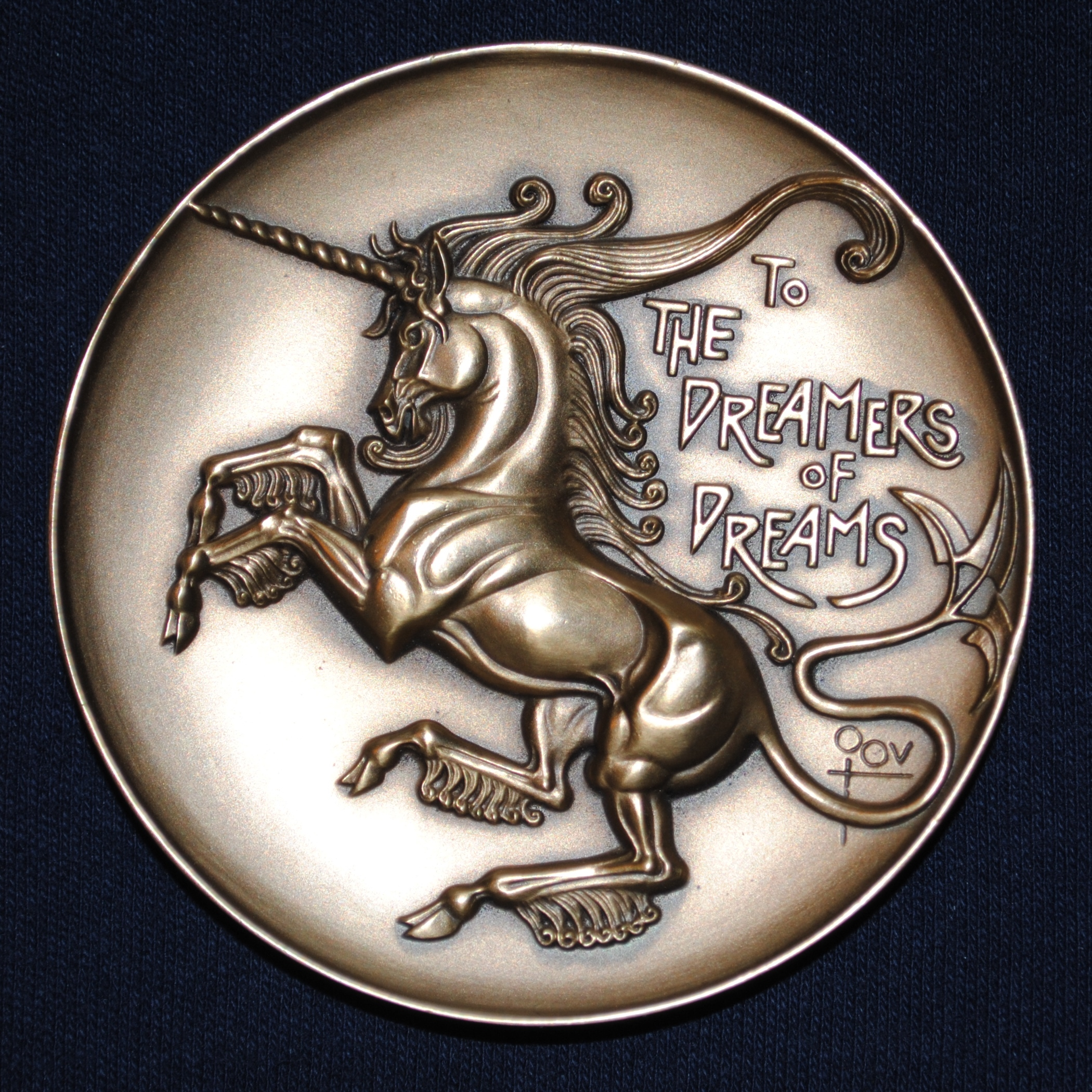
Society of Medalists Issue 101, Unicorn and Medieval Procession, by Marcel Jovine. 1980 bronze.

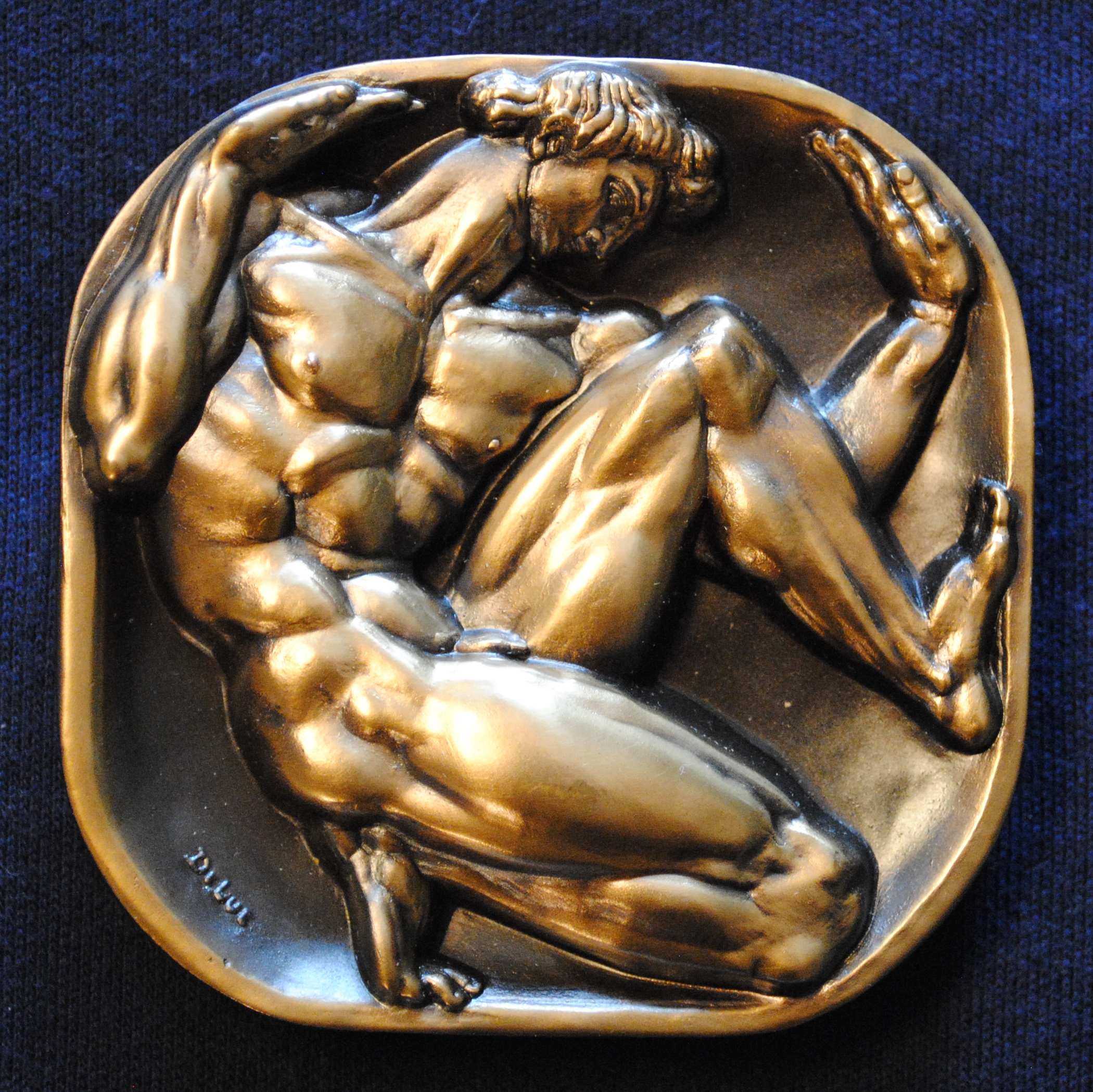
Society of Medalists Issue 111, Man bursting the Bounds and Back of Man, by Donald De Lue. 1985 bronze.

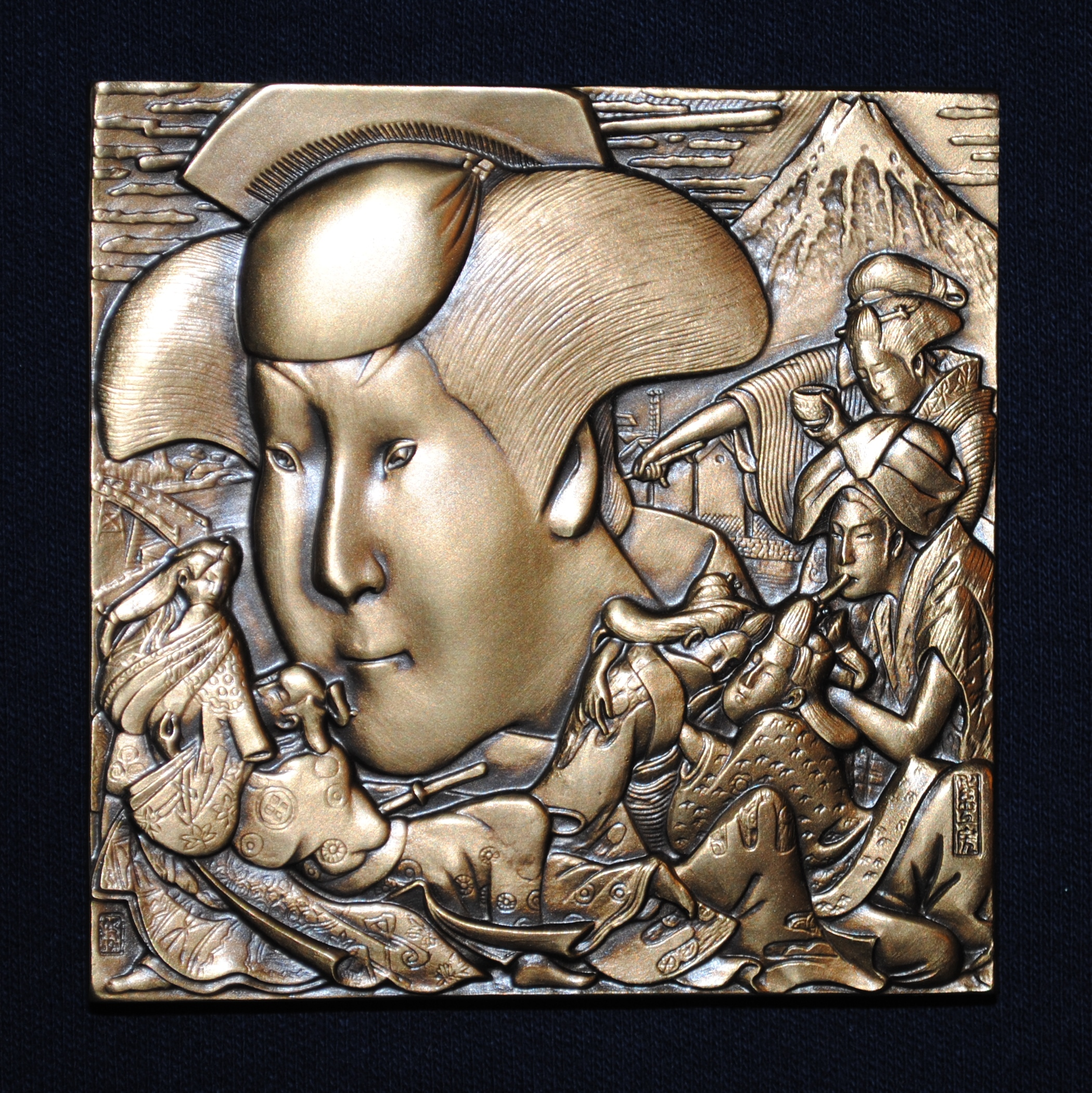
Society of Medalists Issue 120, Man is Strength Woman is Love and Beauty, by Keiichi Uryu. 1989 bronze.

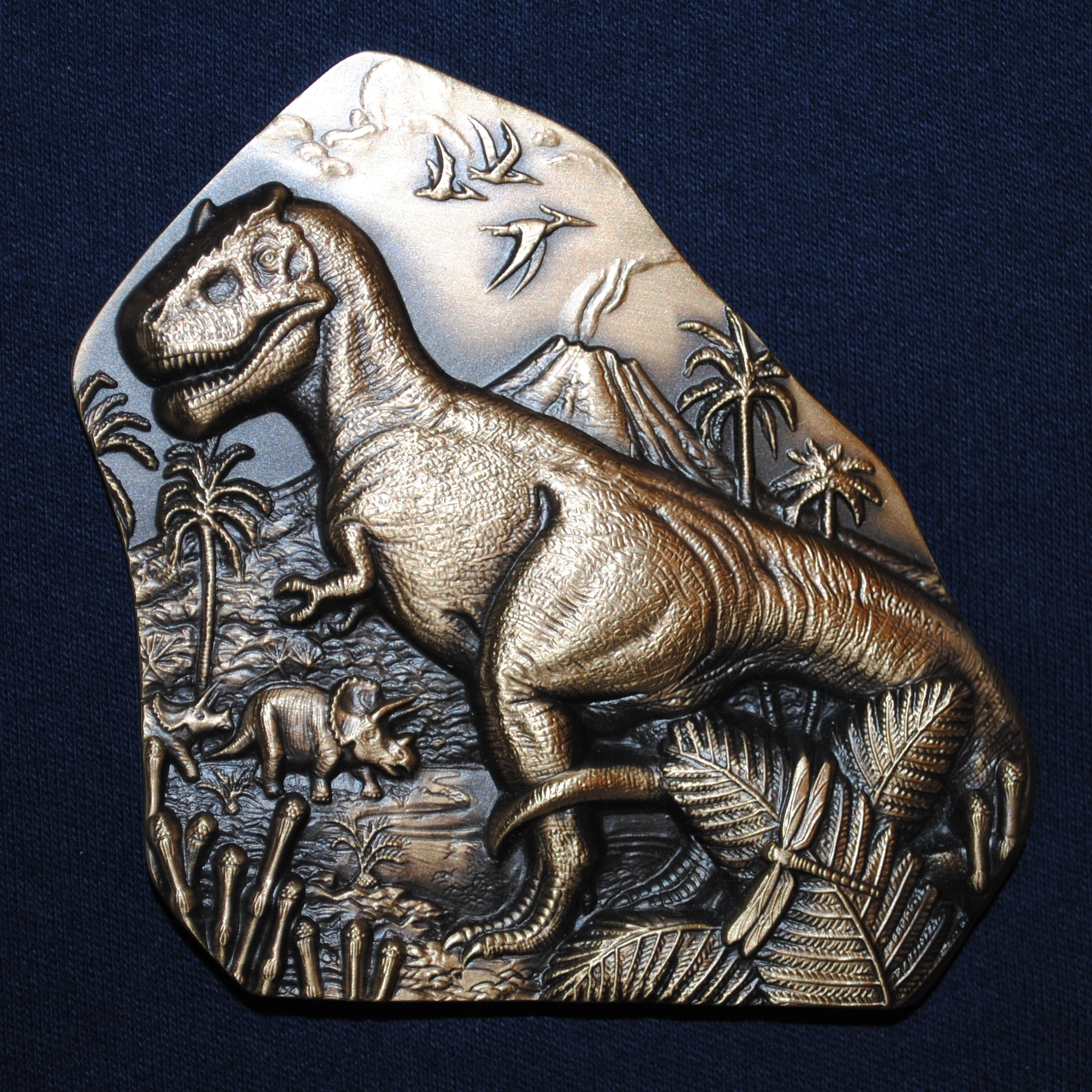
Society of Medalists Issue 125, Tyrannosaurus Rex and Tyrannosaurus Rex fossil, by Don Everhart III. 1993 bronze.

Many of the early contributors to the Society of Medalists were prominent American sculptors of the first half of the 20th century. Lee Lawrie was well known for modernistic art-deco works like the Statue of Atlas in New York City and the Sower atop the Nebraska State Capitol, while artists like Lorado Taft represented a more classical ethos. Others concentrated more, although not exclusively, on medallic art, such as John Flanagan (designer of the Washington quarter dollar) and Laura Gardin Fraser. The artists who created the series represented a wide variety of styles and expertise.

The Society of Medalists issues covered a wide variety of themes during its sixty-five years of existence. Because the artists were allowed to select their subject matter, many of the medals are topical. Those of the 1930s frequently serve as commentary on the experiences of the first World War, and anticipate the destruction of the second. Religion often serves as a theme, with interpretations of biblical scenes prevalent throughout all decades. Art, science, and nature also provided inspiration for artists and their medals'.

With two exceptions, all issues of the Society of Medalists were initially manufactured in bronze. Issues 28 and 29, created during World War II, were first produced in silver. During the 1970s the Society undertook a program to restrike its earlier issues in silver. The advent of a spike in silver prices late in the decade, coupled with a low level of demand for the new issues, led to the demise of the silver restrike program by the early 1980s.

The Society of Medalist represents an accessible collecting opportunity. The issues are available on the secondary market, with both specialized dealers and internet auction services serving as sources. Collectors value the medals in their original boxes, complete with the descriptive pamphlets that accompanied them.

== History ==
Although the official date of establishment was 1930, there was a public notice for the organization in the January 1929 edition of The Numismatist, the journal of the American Numismatic Association. The notice also stated that, "The Society of Medalists had its inception at the convention of the American Federation of Arts in Washington last May" (May 1928). The notice further stated, "The organization committee is composed of George D. Pratt, Robert W. DeForest and Alexander B. Trowbridge", however, later documents attributed the founding entirely to Pratt. Additionally, the notice discussed that, "Exceptionally accurate machinery makes it possible to strike medals to the quantity of 1,000 or more for very low cost."

In 2010 the American Numismatic Society published the authoritative reference and history of both the Circle of Friends of the Medallion and the Society of Medalists, American Art Medals, 1909-1995 by well known numismatic scholar David Thomason Alexander. In 2016, the Northwest Territorial Mint, parent company of the Medallic Art Company, declared bankruptcy and its assets were subsequently liquidated. In 2018 the American Numismatic Society acquired Medallic Art's archive of historic medals, including records, dies, and examples of the Society of Medalists.

In 2018, Medalcraft Mint of Green Bay, Wisconsin, which had acquired the Medallic Art Company tradename in the bankruptcy, struck a small number of bronze medals by sculptor Steve Adams on the theme of The Princess and the Frog, edge-marked as the Society's 130th issue, in an attempted revival of the series. The project was cancelled before any public release, with an estimated dozen examples struck.

	Issue	Year	Sculptor	Obverse	Reverse
REGULAR	1	1930	Laura Gardin Fraser	Hunter and dog	Ruffled grouse
ISSUES	2	1930	Paul Manship	Dionysus	Satyrs treading grapes
	3	1931	Hermon A. MacNeil	Indian prayer for rain	Hopi snake dance
	4	1931	Frederick MacMonnies	Charles A. Lindbergh	Lone Eagle allegory
	5	1932	Lee Lawrie	Whatsoever a man soweth	That shall he also reap
	6	1932	John Flanagan	Aphrodite	Torch race
	7	1933	Carl Paul Jennewein	Gloria	Fama
	8	1933	Gaetano Cecere	Pegasus and men	No easy way to the stars
	9	1934	Herbert Adams	Boy fishing	Little fish a prize
	10	1934	Albert Laessle	American-turkey	Abundance-corn
	11	1935	Lorado Taft	Great lakes	Five maidens
	12	1935	Anthony de Francisci	Creation	Swirling universe
	13	1936	R. Tait McKenzie	Youth putting the shot	Four runners
	14	1936	Albert Stewart	Ploughman and crosses	Peace
	15	1937	Robert I. Aitken	Lovers	All mankind loves a lover
	16	1937	Chester Beach	In peace fathers die	In war sons die
	17	1938	A. Stirling Calder	Dance of life	With pleasure and pain
	18	1938	Gertrude K. Lathrop	Conserve wildlife	Antelope
	19	1939	Edward McCartan	Peace in the new world	War in the old world
	20	1939	John Gregory	Cere's blessing	Scarcity shall shun you
	21	1940	Edmond Amateis	Aesop's fable of hawk	Dog and reflection
	22	1940	Walker Hancock	Two men building	Overcoming adversity
	23	1941	Joseph E. Renier	Woman and child	Prometheus
	24	1941	Edwin Springweiler	Arctic-polar bear	Antarctic-penguins
	25	1942	Janet de Coux	Thou sluggard	Go to the ant
	26	1942	Brenda Putnam	Man with airplane	Bird in flight
	27	1943	Anna Hyatt Huntington	African elephant	Water hole
	28	1943	Carl L. Schmitz	Freedom of speech and religion	Freedom from want and fear
	29	1944	Richard Henry Recchia	Inspiration	Aspiration
	30	1944	Mahonri Young	Riggers	Riveters
	31	1945	Rene P. Chambellan	Flag raising on Iwo Jima	For conquer we must
	32	1945	Berthold Nebel	Wounded soldier	Atomic bomb explosion
	33	1946	Joseph Kiselewski	World peace	Dove and olive branch
	34	1946	Sidney Waugh	Privacy makes innocent	Nameless worthy
	35	1947	Bruce Moore	Eternal vigilance	Destruction
	36	1947	Henry Kreis	Wise virgins	Foolish virgins
	37	1948	Michael Lantz	John the Baptist	Salome
	38	1948	Thomas Lo Medico	Pursuit of happiness	Good will toward men
	39	1949	Adolph A. Weinman	Genesis	Web of destiny
	40	1949	Leo Friedlander	Harmony	Creates tranquility
	41	1950	Donal Hord	Man must sow	To reap
	42	1950	(in French) Cecil Howard	Peace is life	War is death
	43	1951	Albert A. Wein	God the creator	Creating heaven and Earth
	44	1951	Wheeler Williams	Madonna and child	Lamb
	45	1952	James Earl Fraser	Pony Express	New Frontiers
	46	1952	Karl Gruppe	Eagle	Boy Scouts
	47	1953	Gifford MacGregor Proctor	Fish	Dry fly lure
	48	1953	Peter Dalton	Brotherhood	Swords into ploughshares
	49	1954	Abram Belskie	Art goddess	Sculptor's tools
	50	1954	Ivan Meštrović	Socrates	Plato
	51	1955	Malvina Hoffman	Races of man	No man is an island
	52	1955	Georg J. Lober	Hans Christian Andersen	150th Anniversary
	53	1956	John Angel	Adam and Eve	Annunciation of Virgin
	54	1956	Paul Fjelde	Walt Whitman	Leaves of Grass
	55	1957	Pietro Montana	St. Francis of Assisi at prayer	St. Francis and leper
	56	1957	Donald De Lue	Creator of universe	Creator of man
	57	1958	Charles Rudy	Year's at the spring	Day's at the morn
	58	1958	Jean de Marco	Clown with horn	Music and drama
	59	1959	Allan Houser	Apache fire dancer	Buffalo hunt
	60	1959	Katherine Weems	Puma	Wild fowl
	61	1960	Leo Lentelli	Romulus and Remus	Constantine the Great
	62	1960	Adlai S. Hardin	Three wisemen	Nativity
	63	1961	Adolph Block	Pilgrims landing	Holy cause of liberty
	64	1961	Nathaniel Choate	Goliath	David
	65	1962	Oronzio Maldarelli	Dancers	Bathers
	66	1962	Carl C. Mose	This our heritage	This our land
	67	1963	Karen Worth	To the stars	Spirit of the space age
	68	1963	Joseph Coletti	Glory of God	Great frigate bird
	69	1964	Robert A. Weinman	Honor to Socrates	Light of knowledge
	70	1964	Frank Eliscu	Underwater swimmer	Seascape
	71	1965	Margaret Christian Grigor	Alaska	Hawaii
	72	1965	Elizabeth Weistrop	Sower of the forest	Squirrels
	73	1966	Robert Lohman	Nature	Creativity
	74	1966	Ralph J. Menconi	Thomas Jefferson	Liberty
	75	1967	Herring Coe	Flying sauser	Hippocampus and mermaid
	76	1967	Donald R. Miller	Five forms of life	Wilderness is preservation
	77	1968	Nina Winkel	Girls dancing	Boys building
	78	1968	Terry Lies	Medical research	Spider and web
	79	1969	Bruno Mankowski	Paul Bunyan	Johnny Appleseed
	80	1969	Boris Buzan	Space control room	Astronaut on Moon
	81	1970	Julian Hoke Harris	Uncle Remus tales	Brer Rabbit in briar patch
	82	1970	Tom Allen, Jr.	Flame of life	Pro vita
	83	1971	Hal Reed	Four scientists	Unleashing the atom
	84	1971	Elbert Weinberg	Pandora one	Atomic cloud
	85	1972	Sten Jacobsson	Christ and multitude	Pagan joys
	86	1972	John Edward Svenson	Chilkat Chieftain	Indian carvings
	87	1973	Mico Kaufman	Youth with guitar	Soldier carrying wounded
	88	1973	Edward R. Grove	Alphabets of the world	English alphabet
	89	1974	Laszlo Ispanky	Girl in spring	Youth in fall
	90	1974	Stanley Bleifeld	Chinese philosophers	Chinese landscape
	91	1975	Frederick Shrady	Courage and hope	Bird in flight
	92	1975	Bruno Lucchesi	Couple embracing	Mother and baby
	93	1976	Harvey Weiss	Grasshopper	Whale
	94	1976	Anthony Notaro	Pilgrims	Mayflower
	95	1977	Harry Marinsky	Youth dreaming	Castle in Spain
	96	1977	Stephen Robin	Tutankhamun	Egyptian pectoral
	97	1978	Robert Cook	Music	Dance
	98	1978	Moissaye Marans	Dawn	Dusk
	99	1979	Donald A. Borja	Helios the Sun God	Solar energy
	100	1979	Linda Harper	Laughter	Tears
	101	1980	Marcel Jovine	Unicorn	Medieval procession
	102	1980	Edward Fenno Hoffman III	Alice in Wonderland	Winnie the Pooh
	103	1981	Laci de Gerenday	Cougar	Deer in woods
	104	1981	Elisabeth Gordon Chandler	Visual arts	Performing arts
	105	1982	John Cook	Faun with pipes	Man with mask
	106	1982	Don Everhart II	Dance of the dolphins	Dolphins leaping
	107	1983	Joseph Di Lorenzo	Excalibur	Camalot
	108	1983	Carter Jones	George Balanchine	Dancers
	109	1984	Dexter Jones	Clown	Harlequin and Columbine
	110	1984	Margaret C. Ellison	Bands of living creatures	Zodiac
	111	1985	Donald De Lue	Man bursting the bounds	Back of man
	112	1985	Richard McDermott Miller	Girl escaping man	Man capturing girl
	113	1986	Marika Somogyi	Woman looking in mirror	Devel watching thru mirror
	114	1986	Alex Shagin	Children circling globe	Earth from space
	115	1987	Robert A. Weinman	Cat and mouse	Cat behind cheese
	116	1987	Robert Cronbach	Sunrise	Moonrise
	117	1988	Leonda Finke	The Prodigal Son - departure	Emotional Reunion
	118	1988	Patrica Lewis-Verani	Snow - Eskimo and dog sled	Sand - Arab on Camel
	119	1989	Nicola d'Alton Moss	Charles Darwin	Giant Galapagos turtle
	120	1989	Keiichi Uryu	Man is Strength	Woman is Love and Beauty
	121	1990	Eugene Daub	Spirit of fire	Depiction of ice
	122	1990	Marcel Jovine	Michelangelo's Creation	Biblical prophesy
	123	1991	Michael Meszaros	Winding Staircase	Staircase Looking Down
	124	1992	Joseph Sheppard	Icarus flight toward the Sun	Icarus in free fall
	125	1993	Don Everhart III	Tyrannosaurus Rex	Tyrannosaurus Rex fossil
	126	1993	Karen Worth	Adam and Eve	Retribution
	127	1994	Amuhullah Haiderzad	The Old Kabul Bazaar
	128	1994	Don Everhart II	Set of six dinosaur medals	Dinosaur fossils
	129	1995	Geri Gould	Last Supper	Nativity to Resurrection
UNRELEASED	130	2018	Steve Adams	Princess and a frog at a pond	Prince and princess approaching a castle
SPECIAL	SP1	1950	John Flanagan	Mark Twain Centenary
ISSUES	SP2	1970	Julian Hoke Harris	40th Anniversary motif	Athenian Owl
	SP3	1976	Marcel Jovine	Yankee Doodle	Tricorner Hat
	SP4	1980	Chester Martin	Snail and Galaxy	Five Decades
	SP5	1980	Edward R. Grove	Nature Montage	50th Anniversary Sculptors
