= Thomas Gaetano LoMedico =

American sculptor

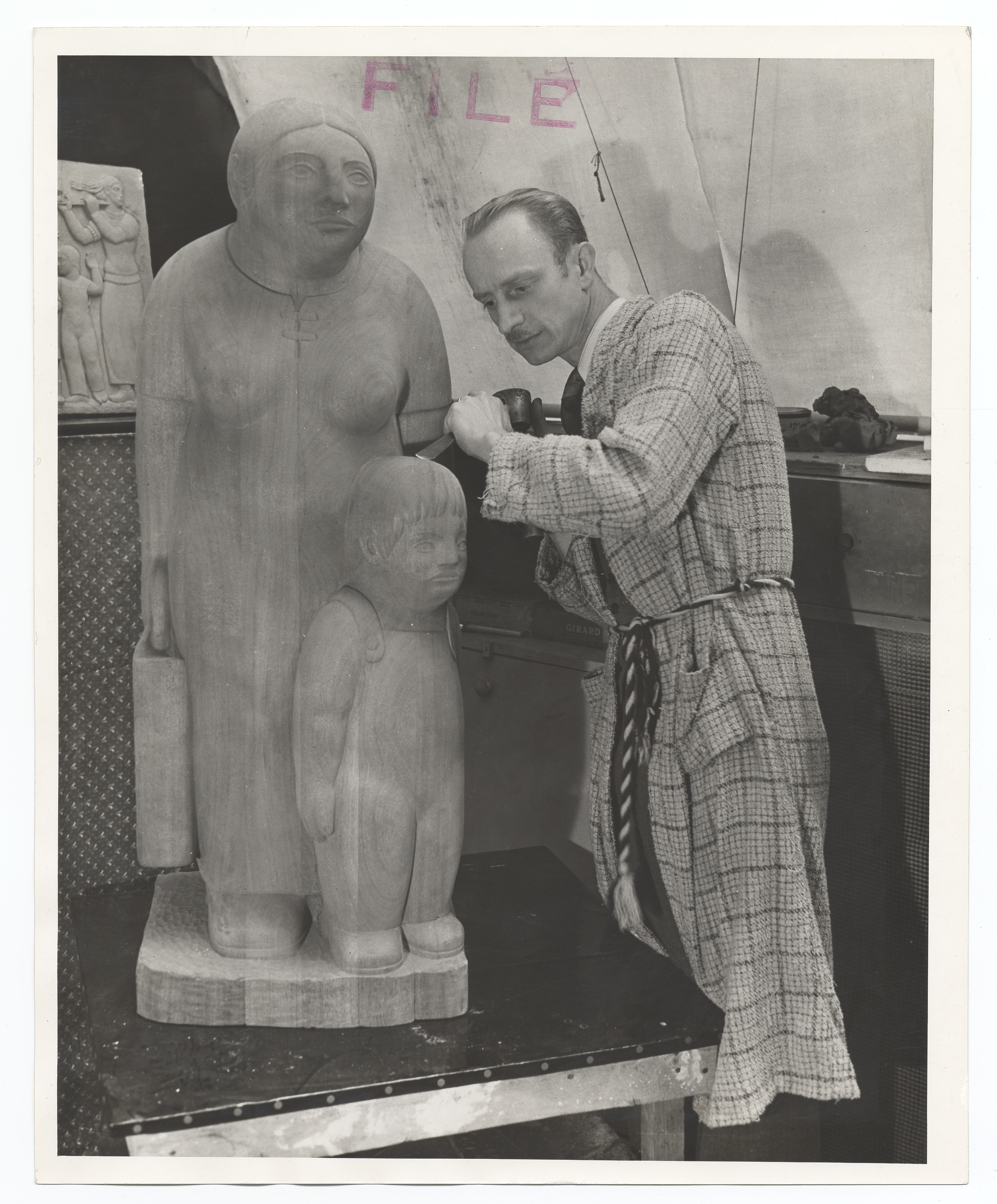
- Born: July 11, 1904; New York City
- Died: November 29, 1985 (aged 81); Tappan, New York
- Education: Beaux Arts Institute of Design
- Known for: Sculpture, Art Medals
- Spouse: Leonora Lisciandra LoMedico
- Awards: Saltus Award

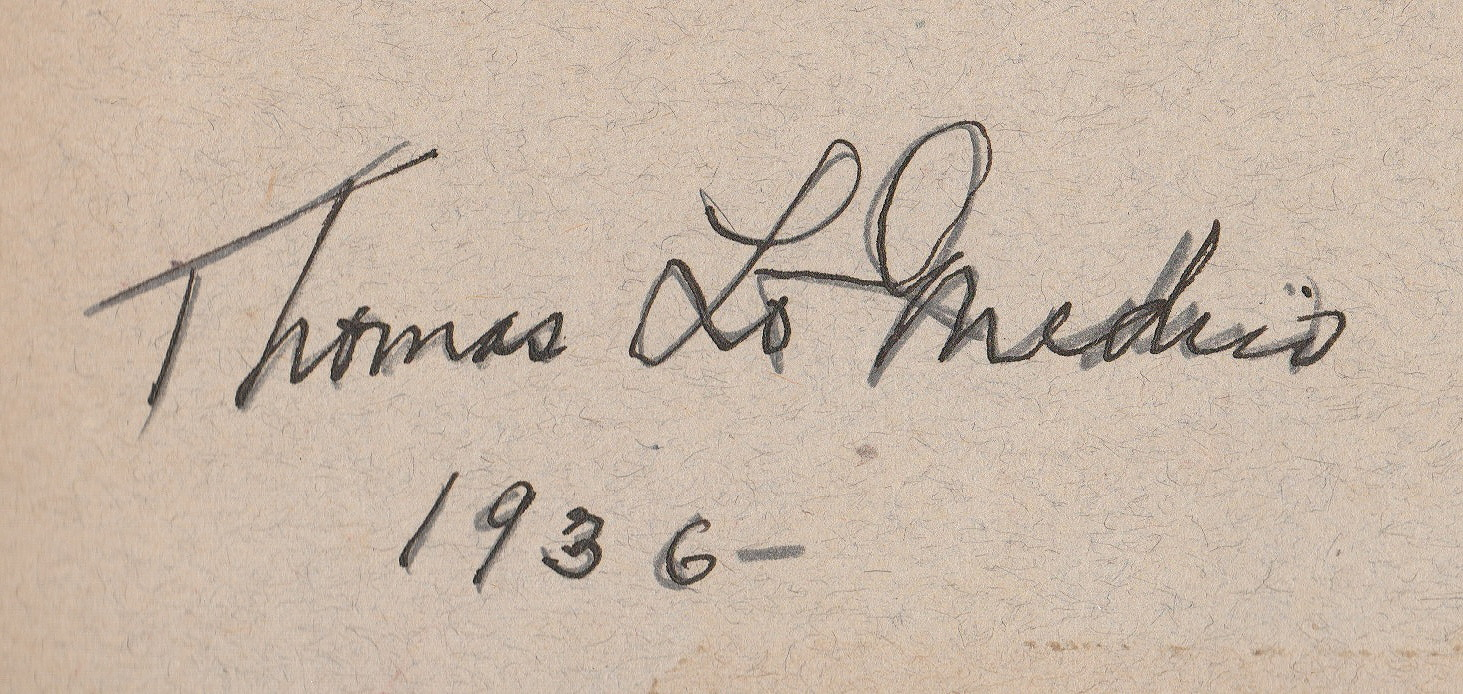

Thomas Gaetano LoMedico (July 11, 1904 – November 29, 1985) was an American sculptor and medalist. Born and raised in New York City, his sculpture won awards in the 1930s and 1940s and is now in several American museum collections.

== Life and career ==
Thomas Lo Medico was born in Upper East Side Manhattan on July 11, 1904, the son of Philip and Angelina Cimino Lo Medico. His interest in the arts surfaced at a young age and while at PS 13 (Manhattan) he designed posters for neighborhood storefronts to promote the sale of WW I Liberty Bonds. In 1920, at age 16, he was hired as an artist's apprentice in a New York architectural sculpture studio. In the evenings from 1920 thru 1928 he studied at the Beaux Arts Institute of Design. Chartered in 1916, the Beaux Arts Institute had as its mission promotion of the Beaux-Arts architectural style and fostering of closer relationships between architects, muralists, and sculptors.

In 1935, after fifteen years creating architectural sculpture, Lo Medico opened his own studio in New York City. The Great Depression made it difficult for young sculptors to cast and sell small works as collectors still financially in a position to purchase artwork tended to support recognized sculptors such as Paul Manship. At the same time, the New Deal created opportunities for lesser known sculptors to pursue commissions for federal contracts via anonymous competitions. Contracts to create art for Federal Buildings were being administered by the Department of Treasury's Section of Painting and Sculpture The section had been established in 1934 under Edward Bruce, Director of the Public Works of Art Project (PWAP) with a mission to discover new talent and provide work for unemployed artists.

In 1936, Lo Medico was awarded a PWAP contract to execute plaster reliefs for the new Wilmington, North Carolina Post Office. He wrote "I wish to…praise the policy of the Section of Painting and Sculpture in granting freedom and liberal cooperation to the artists in the execution of their work." His seven 4.5-foot-high panels depicting scenes of North Carolina people, commerce, and history were collectively titled "History and Present Day Themes Relating to Wilmington and Its Surroundings". The individual panels are titled Stevedores, Fishing, Cotton Pickers, Chemists, The Mecklenburg Declaration of Independence, The Landing of the English on Roanoke Island, and Education. In 1939, Lo Medico executed a PWAP contract of a terracotta Potter to embellish the interior of the Crooksville, Ohio Post Office.

In 1938, the Metropolitan Life Insurance Company announced an $8000 prize for a sculptural group on the American Family intending to make it the centerpiece of their exhibit at the upcoming 1939 New York World's Fair. The competition attracted 257 entries and the winning entry was Family Group by Lo Medico. From the insurance company's perspective the 12-ft- high statue symbolized an average American family moving forward in life shielded from unforeseen hazards by insurance. In April 1940, after the Fair had closed, Family Group was exhibited at the Whitney Museum courtesy of Met Life.

Lo Medico designed his first medal in 1946 for the National Sculpture Society (NSS). The medal in honor of American sculptor Herbert Adams (1958–1945) was created as an annual memorial (The Herbert Adams Memorial Award) to recognize individuals and organizations that have significantly encouraged and advanced American sculpture. Lo Medico continued to design new medals almost every year thereafter. Some of the sculptors that received the award over the years included Adeline Pond Adams (1947), Lee Lawrie (1954). Joseph Kiselewski (1964), and Patricia Jan Broder (1975), among others.

He taught at the NY School of Industrial Art, and the National Academy of Design.

In 1956, Lo Medico moved to Tappan, NY and constructed an art studio behind his house on Main St. where he continued to create sculpture and medals. He died at home on November 29, 1985, at age 81. He was survived by his wife Lenora Lisciandra Lo Medico.

In 1993, his widow donated Lo Medico's papers including correspondence about commemorative medals, sculpture competitions, commissions, and financial records to Smithsonian Archives of American Art. Previous to this, in 1967 & 1971 Lo Medico donated photographs of his work to the Special Collections Research Center at Syracuse University Library.

== Artistic controversy ==
On June 17, 1942, Lo Medico won a $1,000 first prize in a competition to design a public sculpture with the theme "Wings for Victory – The Spirit of Aviation". The competition was sponsored by Artists for Victory, Inc., a consortium of twenty-three artists' organizations. The idea was to create a temporary outdoor sculpture that would promote patriotism and incentivize the purchase of War Bonds. Lo Medico submitted a one-third scale model of a 24-foot-high weather resistant plaster stature depicting a resolute looking WW II aviator in flight suit pulling on gloves. His entry was the unanimous choice of the eleven jurors from among 149 entries and the full size statue was expected to be displayed in a prominent public location. The suggested location was in front of the NY Public Library at 42nd St. & 5th Ave. Contest results were announced at the Whitney Museum of American Art and Lo Medico's model along with those of the runners-up were placed on display in the museum entrance hall. Newspapers and magazines around the nation publicized the award and published photos of the winning entry.

In August 1942, New York City Mayor, Fiorello La Guardia sent a letter to Artists for Victory. Inc. expressing disapproval of Lo Medico's design. He stated that he would not approve the statue's placement on any city owned property. The mayor was quoted in the press describing the statue as a "piece of second or third-rate art looking for a first-class controversy". Robert Moses, NYC Parks Commissioner concurred and opposed its display in any city park.

Paul Manship, noted sculptor and the Vice-President of Artists for Victory expressed his support for the jury's decision and suggested erecting the stature on private property or in a different city.

In 1980, nearly 40 years later, commenting on this incident, Lo Medico seemed to blame the media for creating the controversy: "I became a mildly notorious subject thanks to the newspapers. …The sculpture was simply a dramatic rendition of a World War II aviator. It was 24-feet-high and, of course, it was going to be placed in one of the most prominent spots in New York City. That was the plan, but Mayor La Guardia, who was then the mayor of New York, for some reason said 'no'. That was it. The newspapers made quite a thing of it. And, of course, artists all over protested the mayor's decision. It was never put in front of the library." At the time of this interview in 1980, the original 8-ft-high competition model of Wings for Victory was on display in Lo Medico's Tappan, NY studio.

== Awards and recognition ==
- (1938) Elected Fellow of the National Sculpture Society.
- (1956) J. Sanford Saltus Award for his Medallic Art form the American Numismatic Society.
- (1952) National Sculpture Society Lindsey Morris Prize for best bas-relief.
- Member of the National Academy of Design.
- Member of Allied Artists of America.
- Recognized by and member of the Architectural League of New York.

Lo Medico's artwork has been shown at the Metropolitan Museum of Art (New York), the Whitney Museum of American Art, the National Academy of Design, the Pennsylvania Academy of the Fine Arts, and the Smithsonian American Art Museum Renwick Gallery.

== Selected works ==
- (1936) Seven Reliefs for the "New" Wilmington, North Carolina Post Office.
- (1937) Mother and Child/The Immigrant sculpture.
- (1938) Family Group sculpture for the Metropolitan Life Insurance Company exhibit at the 1939 New York World's Fair.
- (1939) Potter for Crooksville, Ohio Post Office.
- (1946) Herbert Adams Memorial Annual Award Medal for the National Sculpture Society. Lo Medico's design won a design competition for creation of this medal.
- (1948) Society of Medalists 38th Issue medal – Pursuit of Happiness.
- (1955–59) Statues of St. John Chrysostom, St. Ignatius, St. Justin, St. Leo, St. Jerome, and St. Augustine for the Shrine of the Immaculate Conception, Washington, D.C.
- (1952) Popular Mechanics Hall of Fame Tenth Anniversary bronze plaque.
- (1953) University of Puerto Rico 50th Anniversary Medal.
- (1954) World Council of Churches 2nd Assembly Medal presented to attendees at the August 1954 Conference in Evanston, Illinois.
- (1958) American Institute of Certified Public Accountants Recognition Medal.
- (1963) City of Rye, NY Official Seal for the exterior of the new City Hall.
- (1964) Medallic Art Co. Hall of Fame for Great Americans Series: Alice Freeman Palmer Medal.
- (1964) Students anodized bronze relief for Junior High School No 7, Staten Island, NY.
- (1965) National Commemorative Society Paul Revere Medal.
- (1966) Medallic Art Co. Hall of Fame for Great Americans Series: Patrick Henry Medal.
- (1968) American Negro Commemorative Society Jean Baptiste Pointe du Sable Medal.
- (1968) National Sculpture Society 75th Anniversary Medal.
- (1970) Texas Astronauts Medal of Valor commissioned by the State of Texas and presented to Neil A. Armstrong, Edwin E. Aldrin Jr., and Michael Collins in recognition of the first Moon landing.
