= Presidential Inauguration Support Ribbon =

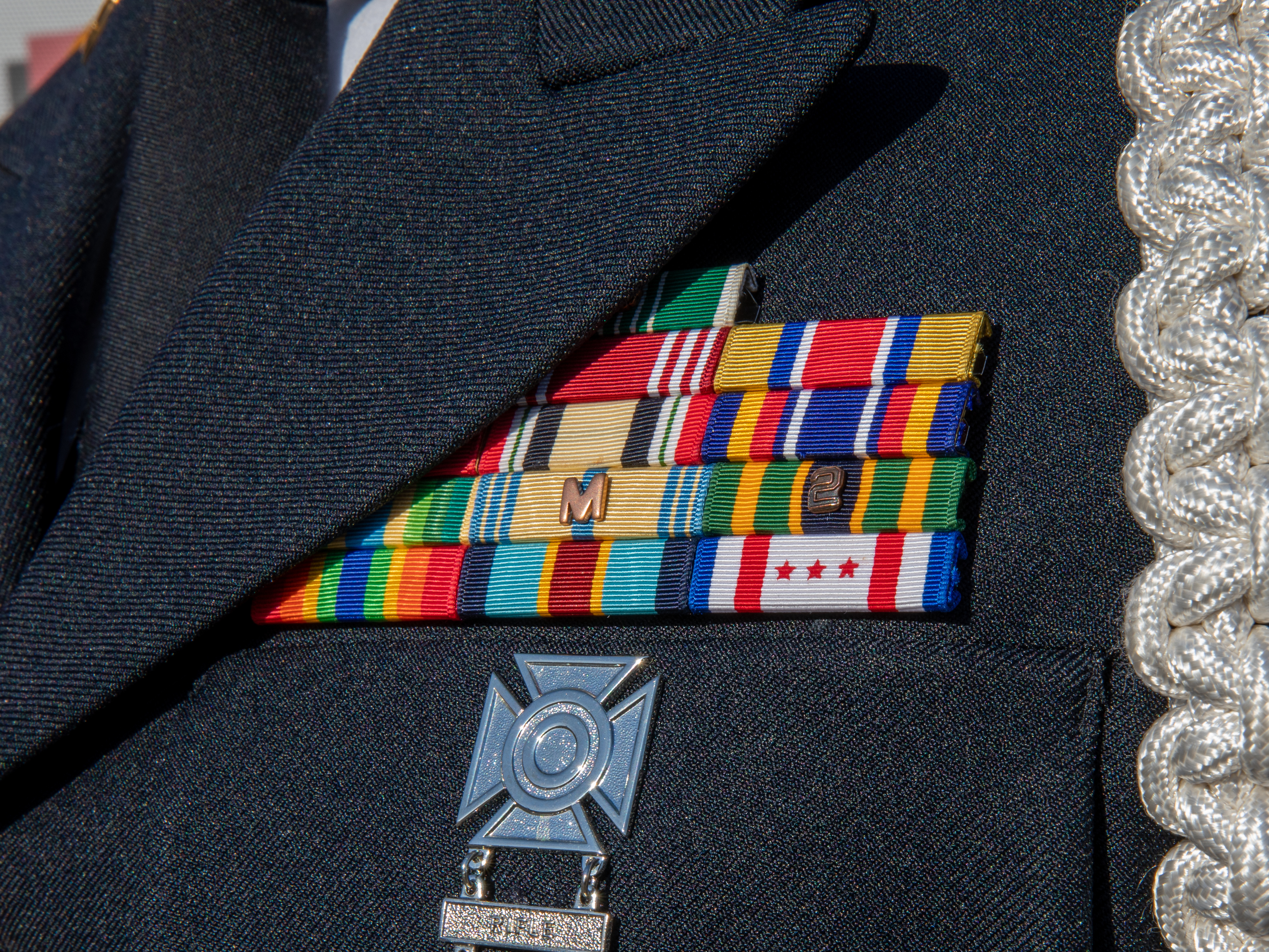
- Presidential Inauguration Support Ribbon seen on the bottom right
- Type: Service ribbon
- Awarded for: Support of the 59th U.S. Presidential Inauguration on Title 32 orders
- Presented by: District of Columbia National Guard
- Eligibility: National Guard personnel from any state, territory or the District of Columbia
- Status: Currently awarded
- First award: 2021

Precedence
- Equivalent: Army:
- Next (lower): Department of Defense:

The Presidential Inauguration Support Ribbon is the United States National Guard military decoration awarded to National Guardsmen who support U.S. Presidential Inaugurations and meet certain criteria. It was first awarded following the inauguration of President Joe Biden in 2021.

== History ==
In response to the Capitol Hill riot on January 6, 2021, elements from the National Guard of all 50 states, territories, and the District of Columbia were mobilized to enhance security before, during, and after the 2021 Presidential Inauguration.

== Criteria ==
The ribbon is presently authorized for any National Guard personnel from any state, territory or the District of Columbia who deployed to the area before, during, or after the 59th U.S. Presidential Inauguration on Title 32 orders. Future periods of inaugural support will also establish eligibility for wear of the ribbon. Civilians who render inaugural support are eligible for award of an equivalent certificate indicating their support, but not a military decoration.

== Wear ==
The ribbon is authorized for wear by National Guard members not on U.S. Title 10 orders, after Active Duty U.S. military awards and after authorized foreign awards and awards from a Guardsman's home state, following U.S. Army Regulation 670-1.

== Description and symbolism ==
Service Ribbon

Developed by the D.C. National Guard and approved by the Army Institute of Heraldry in late 2020, the ribbon features red, white and blue vertical bands at each end and three red stars centered horizontally on a white background. The three stars represent the Flag of Washington, D.C. and the red, white and blue colors represent the U.S. flag.

== See also ==
- Awards and decorations of the United States Armed Forces
