= Presidential Inaugural Medals =

Presidential Inaugural Medals have a long history in the United States. The tradition can be traced back to the first president, George Washington, and continues on today with President Donald Trump.

== History ==
Samuel Brooks created the first presidential medal for President George Washington—the medal produce had a crude profile of Washington on one side and is known as the "Manly medal". When elected for his second term in office, "success tokens" were distributed as mementos following Washington's inauguration, but the medals were not produced for the actual festivities. Thomas Jefferson received the first unofficial presidential inaugural medal produced by John Reich in 1802. The silver medal was sold for $4.25 and the tin medal for $1.25. For years, independent medal makers would produce presidential medals to commemorate a specific president's inauguration. In addition, unofficial presidential buttons, ribbons, and badges were produced. All of these became increasingly popular once elaborate inaugural festivities were thrown in Washington, D.C because the various items became favored souvenirs for the attendees. Since there was no standard medal, historians have uncovered medals in various sizes and qualities, as well as composed of different metals.

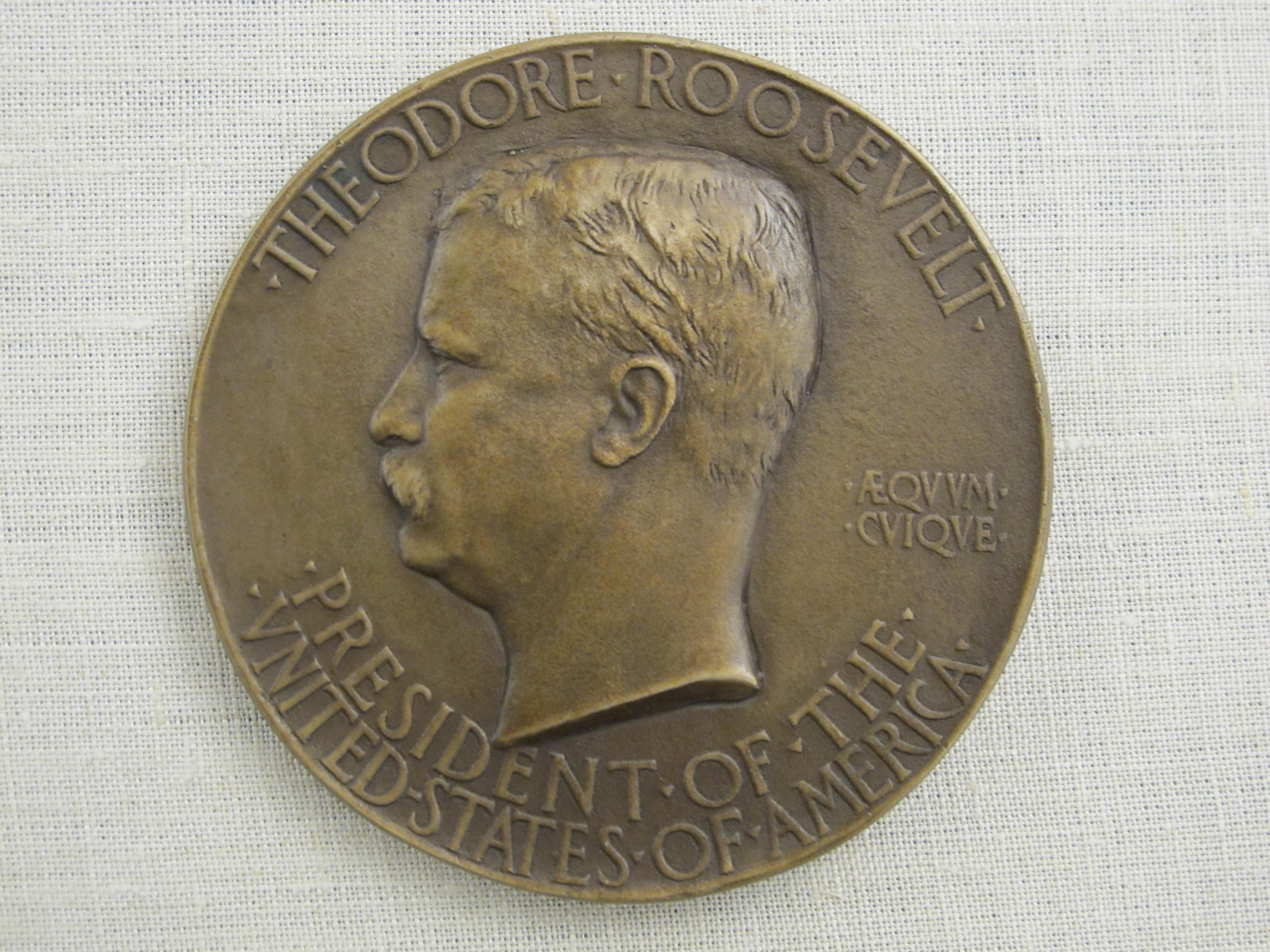
Obverse of a 1905 Roosevelt presidential inaugural medal.

When the government decided it could no longer afford the inaugural celebrations at the turn of the twentieth century, D.C. residents took it upon themselves to raise all the funding for inaugural festivities. One way to raise funds was through the sale of official presidential inaugural medals. Instead of various presidential medals being produced for tourist consumption, an official inaugural medal would be produced by the official Inauguration Committee and sold to the public. In 1901, William McKinley received the first official presidential inaugural medal—it had his portrait stamped on one side and the Capitol building on the other. Surrounding the Capitol building are the words, "William McKinley President of the United States * Theodore Roosevelt Vice-President". Instead of being produced by the United States Mint, the medals were produced by the Joseph K. Davison Company of Philadelphia. Scholars believe that 3 gold, 55 silver, and approximately 4,000 bronze medals were produced. The three gold medals were created for the President, Vice President, and President of the Official Inauguration Committee for Medals and Badges. Silver medals were to be distributed among committee members and bronze medals were available for public sale. This set a tradition that is still observed today.

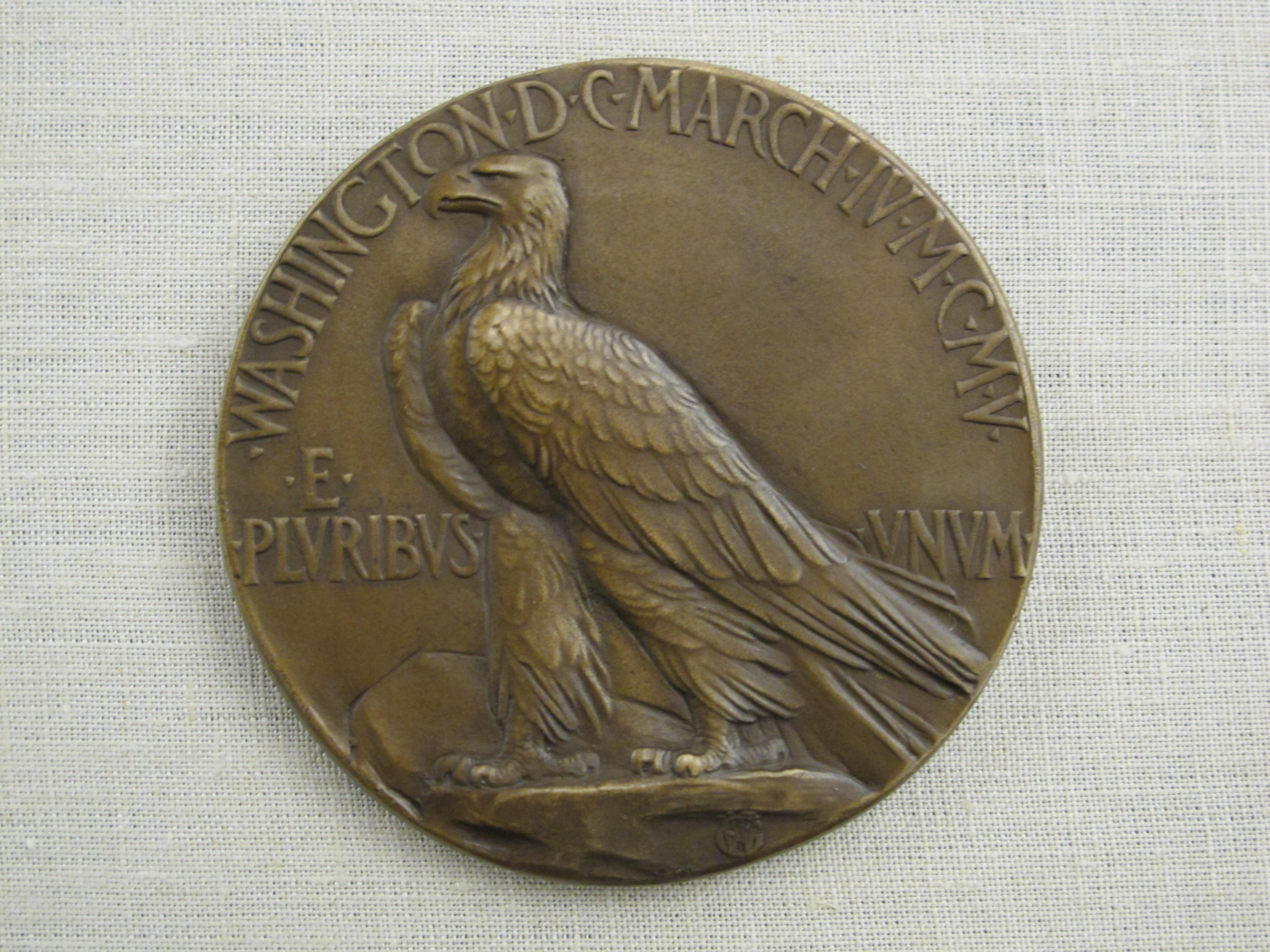
Reverse of a 1905 Roosevelt presidential inaugural medal.

When Theodore Roosevelt came into office in 1905, he decided that the previous medal produced for McKinley would be insufficient for him. Roosevelt, an avid art supporter, wanted his medal to go above and beyond a simple portrait. This led to two different medals being produced for his inauguration—a simpler medal approved by the Committee on Medals and Badges and a medal commissioned by Roosevelt himself. When choosing someone to design his personal inaugural medal, Roosevelt turned to renowned sculptor, Augustus Saint-Gaudens. Saint-Gaudens was at the height of his career and was in negotiations with the U.S. Treasury to make new designs for American coins. It was during his visit to the White House that President Roosevelt also asked him to design a superior inauguration medal for his election. Saint-Gaudens agreed to the President's proposal and immediately began to sketch possibilities. The medal produced from Saint-Gaudens certainly held a superior art aesthetic in comparison to the original medal produced by the Inaugural Committee. One side of the medal displays a distinguished portrait of Roosevelt and the other side holds a high-relief eagle. This is the same eagle that is later used for the $10 coins produced by the U.S. Treasury.

Roosevelt's artistic design continues to influence presidential inaugural medals today. Following Roosevelt's presidency, the Chairmen for the Committee on Medals and Badges purposefully chose artist and other pro-art members in order to produce superior results. The precedence Roosevelt set continued to be followed and efforts were made to contract an artist, whether it be a sculptor or engraver, to design future medals. However, time constraints and the limitations set forth by the contracted firm to produce the medals always affects the final results. Consequently, various degrees of artistic medals have been produced, from the less ornate Woodrow Wilson medals with his portrait on one side and his name and Vice President's Riley Marshall's name on the other side, to the more elaborate John F. Kennedy medal that has his portrait on one side and a high relief Presidential Seal on the other.

When producing a new inaugural medal, the sculptor has the President-elect sit for the creation of a clay sketch. The sketch is then turned into a mask to which additional facial features can be added. The mask is then transformed into a plaster model, then an epoxy cast. The cast is used to create the die cuts that will be used for striking the medals. After the medals have been created, they are immersed in chemicals that darken the piece to create a two-toned effect. Lastly, the medals are lacquered to preserve the piece.

== Collecting Inauguration Medals ==
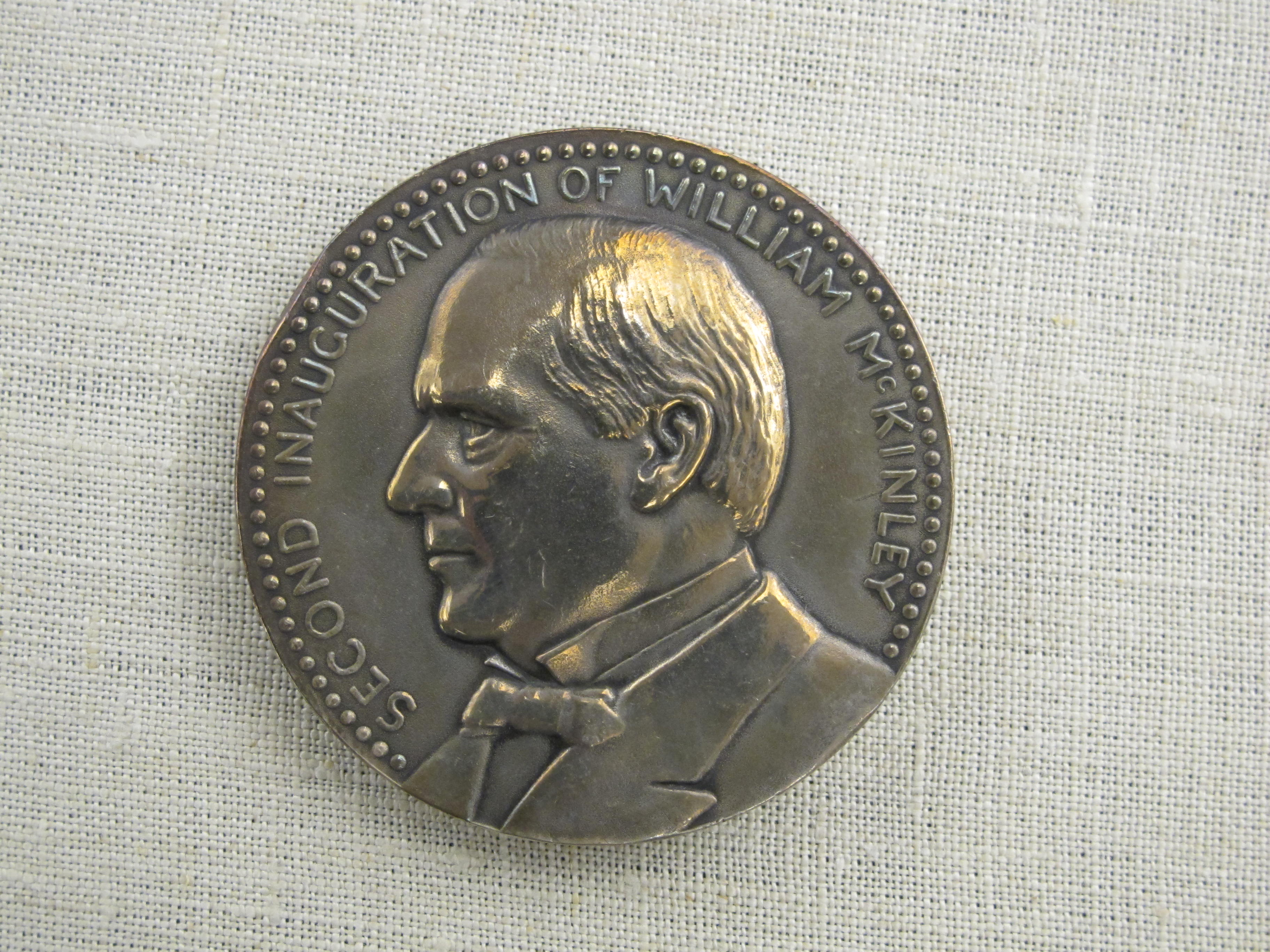
1901 Bronze Presidential Medal for McKinley

It was not until Richard Dusterberg published The Official Inaugural Medals of the Presidents of the United States in 1971 that collecting Presidential Medals began to become popular. The original catalog included pictures of all the medals up to 1969, as well as a price guide. As a result, the increase in collecting led to an increase in prices. Collecting presidential medals has grown in popularity due to the appeal of the subject matter, availability of the pieces, and the fact that it is a defined collection. If a collector chooses to collect the bronze medals, this can be completed fairly easily for a decent price.

The value of the presidential inaugural medals has fluctuated over the years and is highly influenced by auctions and the current U.S. economy. For example, in 1980 there was the Great Gold and Silver Panic when silver was worth $50 per ounce and gold worth $800 per ounce. This led to thousands of medals being melted down for their silver and gold weight values. The medals produced for Richard Nixon, Gerald Ford, and Jimmy Carter fell victim to this panic, which has since then created a shortage available for collectors and therefore a higher price tag for those presidents.

The latest field guide to inaugural medal collecting was published in 2020 by Matthew P. Chiarello, updating the scholarship of Dusterberg, MacNeil, and Levine.

Currently, the Smithsonian Institution and the Special Collections Research Center at The George Washington University hold the most complete collections of presidential inauguration medals. The Smithsonian collection is composed of medals donated by different individuals over the years. In December 1977, the National Portrait Gallery premiered the Smithsonian's medal collection with the exhibition, "The President's Medal". The Special Collections Research Center's collection was donated by Darrell C. Crain in May 1976. Crain's father had designed the presidential medals for President Woodrow Wilson (1917), President Warren G. Harding (1921), and President Calvin Coolidge (1925). In addition, Crain served on the Official Inaugural Medal Committee for five presidents.

== See also ==
- Presidential Inauguration Support Ribbon
