= Jules Edouard Roiné =

American sculptor

- Born: October 24, 1857; Nantes, France
- Died: April 11, 1916 (aged 58)
- Known for: Sculptor & Medallist

Jules Édouard Roiné (Nantes, October 24, 1857 – April 11, 1916), was an exemplary French-American sculptor and master medal engraver of his era.

He was a student of Léopold Morice, renowned sculptor who completed the bas relief over the principal door at St. Etienne in Tours and the monument statue Republique (Marianne) at the Place de la Republique in Paris. Between 1881 and 1894, Roiné spent time in New York City where he participated in the decoration of several churches. Returning to France with an intriguing skill in medal work, Roiné created L'Aurore du XXieme Siècle (Dawn of the Twentieth Century), a distinguished piece that would be honored by the French government. Along with brothers Felix and Henri Weil, he would set a new standard in medal work in America creating the foundation for the Medallic Art Company. They introduced many techniques that shifted to other possibilities for sculptors to cast. During the construction of the Bronx Borough Courthouse (1905-1914), the vastly talented Roiné was commissioned to bring to life the statue of Lady Justice that was to be placed at the center of the building. The statue resulted in one of his finest works and has become part of a U.S. National Historic Place and New York City Landmark, joining the artistry he adorned at Grace Church, which obtained equal landmark recognition.

== Early life and career ==
Jules E. Roiné was born on October 24, 1857. During his early years in France, he gained valuable foundation in the skill of sculpting while studying under Léopold Morice, who along with his brother François-Charles Morice, was an acclaimed sculptor. By 1881, at the age of twenty-five, he embarked on his first trip to America. In his stay, he strengthen his trade as an artist and build many key relationships as an active member of the New York City circle of sculptors. In due course, he met countrymen and brothers Henri and Felix Weil. The trio, based on common heritage and professional interests, forged a lasting friendship that extended through their lifetime.

With talent demonstrated, Roiné gained many lucrative commissions. Gaining attention, he spent his time working in churches and decorating them with his skills. As years past, his interest broaden to other concepts. He purchased materials that would help him experiment and further shape his career. He invested wisely in various tools, chemicals, and machinery such as electrogalvanic tanks and copper anodes that wielded him new techniques to which he could apply to his creativity, producing electroforms. Roiné began working with medal casts. Most of his work revolved around galvano and foundry cast. He was proficient in preparing sculptor’s models which were appropriate for either a struck medal or a bas-relief plaque. He was creating these galvano casts as art objects as early as 1894, making the Marguerite Delpech Plaque, believed to be his first. This was an ideal method of reproducing sculptors’ small bas-relief models (it was only the size of the tank that limited the size of the object to be replicated). He became an early pioneer of this artistic technique in America.

== Breakthrough and success ==
By the late 19th century, Roiné returned to France where he continued his work. For a period he entered the employ of Louis Richards, the famed American sculptor. It is speculated that while in France he might have studied under Frederic Vernon or Louis Oscar Roty, two premiere medallic artists. Eventually, on his own, "he secured a world-wide reputation through the exquisite productions in bas-relief designed in 1900 for the Paris Exposition of that year."

Roiné obtained further widespread notoriety with his work L'Aurore du XXieme Siècle (Dawn of the Twentieth Century), the which was honored by the French government with a gold medal. This gave the artist momentum and newfound acclaim.

He returned to New York City, where he continued to receive more commissions and perfect his craft. He successfully completed the beautiful work at the new Grace Church in New York City. He created the Open Air Pulpit at Grace Church and the Tympanum for the church's doorway. It was said of the artist that, "The sculptor, Mr. Jules Edouard Roiné, is known broadly because of his intellectual equipment. The idealism and exquisite rendering of a plaque, "The Dawn of the Twentieth Century," for which the French government gave him a medal, need no comment. This alone is an acceptable evidence of skill." Roiné was filled by demand and had more commissions than he could handle himself. He turned to his friend Felix Weil. The two formed the prestigious sculpture firm Roiné, Weil and Company in 1908, specializing in bas-reliefs, galvano creations, and preparing models and designing medallic items. Their output for the following year was enormous. Not only was it the New York City celebration for Hudson-Fulton, a year-long activity honoring Henry Hudson and Robert Fulton, it was also the centennial of the birth of Abraham Lincoln. Plaques, badges – and medals! – were required of both. The pair kept busy providing models and patterns for both these medallic functions to medal manufacturers, including Whitehead & Hoag in Newark, Davisons in Philadelphia, Gorham in Providence, and Felix's brother Henri, who was slowing building the Medallic Art Company through the financial support from Roiné and Felix's commissions, while working for Deitsch Brothers.

In New York City, sculptors had a choice of either sending their bas-reliefs to a local foundry in other cities, or Roiné and the Weil's to be electrolytically cast. The cost between the two methods of reproduction were similar, but there was a dramatic difference in detail. Because of the nature of molten metal, foundry casting could reproduce detail down to a 100th of an inch. Electrolytic casting could reproduce detail down to the width of a molecule! For large reliefs, as for the sides of buildings or monuments, such detail was unnecessary. But for smaller reliefs – and for medals! – such minute relief was a blessing. Sculptors learned it gave a sharp, crisp edge to their reliefs which often improved the total appearance. They learned the mantra: “If it’s in the model – meaning even the tiniest detail – it’s in the medal.” That held true for plaques as well.

Roiné and Weil prospered, and some of Roiné's greatest medal work was created in this period, including that of Abraham Lincoln, "which is described as the most beautiful representation of Lincoln's features that has as yet been made. The art critics who have examined the Lincoln medal are at one in the opinion that it must remain the authoritative medallic representation of the great American."

== Art socialite ==
A member of the National Sculpture Society and the Architectural League of New York, Roiné was truly a well respected artist. He exhibited frame of medals at the National Academy of Design New York winter show in 1908: item 369; at the American Numismatic Society’s Exhibition of Contemporary Medallic Art in 1910; a collection at the International Exhibition of Modern Art, more commonly known as the 1913 Armory Show in New York City; among many more.

== Lady Justice and his final years ==
Amid the construction of the Bronx Borough Courthouse (1905-1914), several esteemed international sculptors, including former colleague Louis Richards, applied for the commission of a statue of Lady Justice that was to be placed at the center of the building. Eventually, the talented Roiné submitted his own model and was awarded the commission based on his inspiring renderings. The statue resulted in one of his finest works and has become part of a U.S. National Historic Place and New York City Landmark. Grace Church has garnered the same status as well.

However, in 1915, Roiné contracted Bright’s disease (kidney failure). His illness precluded him from working further at the level as before. Roiné wanted to return to France. He bid farewell to their workshop and Felix put his partner and his family on a steamship bound for France. Roiné died the following year, April 11, 1916.

During the course, Felix attempted to keep the sculpture workshop going on his own, but like his friend Roiné before him, the workload proved to be overwhelming. He ultimately joined his brother Henri in building the Medallic Art company in the same year, continuing Roiné's legacy, which would go on to be a cornerstone in American medal artwork. Among the academic community, Monsieur Roiné is recognized "as one of the great medallists of the world"

== Legacy ==
Some of his distinguished works include:

- L'Aurore du XXieme Siècle (Dawn of the Twentieth Century) ("The original of this work is in the Luxembourg Museum in Paris, and a bas-relief replica has been secured for the gold room of the Metropolitan Museum in New York; a second replica has been placed in the Imperial Museum at Berlin.")
- The Open Air Pulpit at Grace Church in New York City.
- Tympanum For Grace Church Doorway
- The Lincoln Centenary, 1909. For the centennial celebration of Abraham Lincoln, commissioned by the American Numismatic Society, Roiné created a now famous portrait medallion and plaque of the historic U.S. President.
- Memorial of Circle of Friends of the Medallion (commemorating Marquis de Lafayette), 1909
- Commemorating the Hudson-Fulton Celebration, 1909
- Algernon Sydney Sullivan Medal
- Lady Justice at the Bronx Borough Courthouse in New York City

His work has been studied and presented at the U.S. National Museum (Smithsonian Institution), The Metropolitan Museum of Art, and The Peabody Museum, amongst many others.

Much like his teacher before him, Roiné continued his life passing his knowledge to others. One of his star pupils was medalist Maurice Delannoy.

== See also ==
- List of medallists
