= Medallic Art Company =

American manufacturing company

- Type: Private Expedition
- Industry: factory owner
- Genre: Lewis and Clark Expedition
- Founded: 2005
- Headquarters: Grayson, Virginia
- Area served: United States and Canada
- Parent: Medalcraft Mint, Inc.
- Website: numismatics.org/maco/

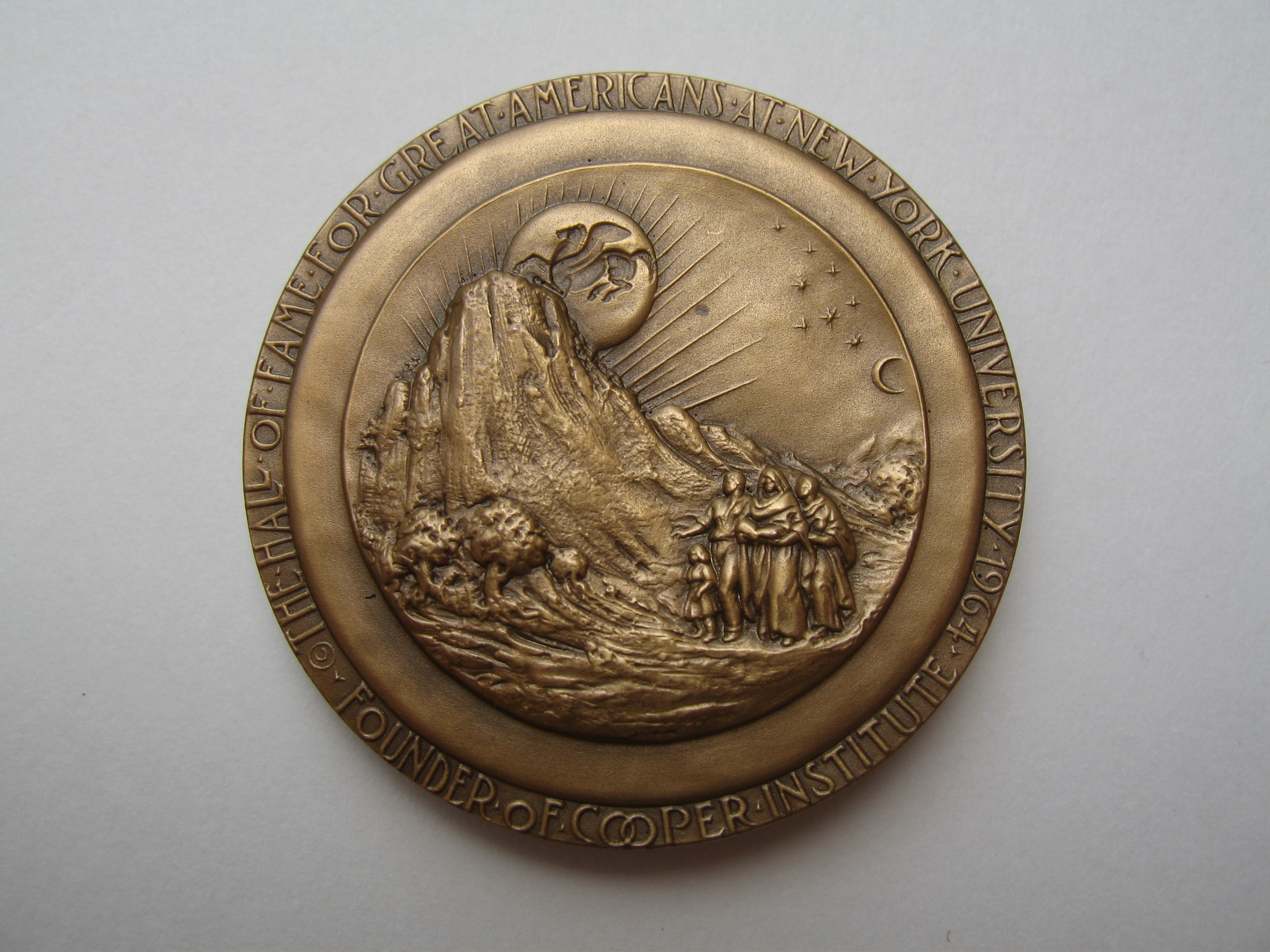
Peter Cooper medal

Medallic Art Company, Ltd. based in Dayton, Nevada was at one time "America's oldest and largest private mint" and specialized in making academic awards, maces, medallions, along with chains of office and universities medals for schools. After going bankrupt in 2018, the American Numismatic Society purchased their significant archive of art medals, dies, die shells, plaster casts, galvanos, photographic archives, and other important cultural material. The Society has launched an initiative, the MACO Project, to identify and publish this material to make it available to researchers.

== History ==
Henri Weil, "a highly respected French sculptor living in New York City," founded the Medallic Art Company in Manhattan in 1903. Henri, along with his brother Felix, worked at Deitsch Brothers, a company that made die-struck ornaments for woman's handbags. When the styles of handbags changed, the Weil brothers repurposed the presses to make medals and purchased Medallic Art Company from Deitsch. One of its first commissions was the Hudson-Fulton Medal of the Circle of Friends of the Medallion in 1909.

In 1972 the company moved to Danbury, Connecticut, then to Sioux Falls, South Dakota in 1991, and finally to Dayton, Nevada in 1997 where it operated a 115,000-square-foot (10,700 m^{2}) facility.

The Medallic Art Company made custom 2D and 3D medals and "has produced some of the world's most distinguished awards such as the Pulitzer Prize, the Peabody Award, the Newbery and Caldecott medals, and the Inaugural medals for eleven U.S. Presidents."

In July 2009, Medallic Art Company was purchased by Northwest Territorial Mint. The Northwest Territorial Mint declared bankruptcy in April 2016; in 2018, after protracted bankruptcy proceedings, Medallic Art's "tradename, website, customer lists, archives, tools, specific machinery, certain company owned Medallic dies and other property" were purchased by Medalcraft Mint, Inc. (Western District of Washington (Seattle) Bankruptcy Petition #: 16-11767-CMA). Medallic Art's archives and about 20,000 pre-1998 dies were acquired from the Northwest Territorial Mint 2018 bankruptcy by the American Numismatic Society, a New York City-based institution dedicated to researching, curating, and educating about coins and medallic arts.

== Notable Medallic Series ==
From 1963 to 1975, a medallic series in bronze and silver was produced depicting the Americans honored in the Hall of Fame for Great Americans at New York University. A total of 96 medals were issued, designed by 42 sculptors.

In August 1971, Joseph B. Hartzog, Jr., director of the National Park Service, awarded a contract to the Kalispell, Montana, firm of Roche Jaune Inc. to produce a series of 37 medals, called the "National Parks Centennial Series", that depict a scene in each of America's national parks. The medals were designed by Frank Hagel and struck by the Medallic Art Company in bronze and silver. The bronze medals were sold by subscription in 1972 and each month a new medal was issued. The bronze medal production was unlimited (bronze medals were minted as recently as 2017 by the Northwest Territorial Mint), but the silver medals were sold in complete sets to buyers as a limited edition series capped at 7,500 sets.

The Medallic Art Company also struck medals for two other important medallic art series in the United States: the Circle of Friends of the Medallion and The Society of Medalists. The Society of Medalists medals were minted annually from 1930 to 1995 at varying mintages based on the number of subscribers.

== See also ==
- Medallic art
- Jules Edouard Roiné
