= Unisphere =

Steel structure in Queens, New York

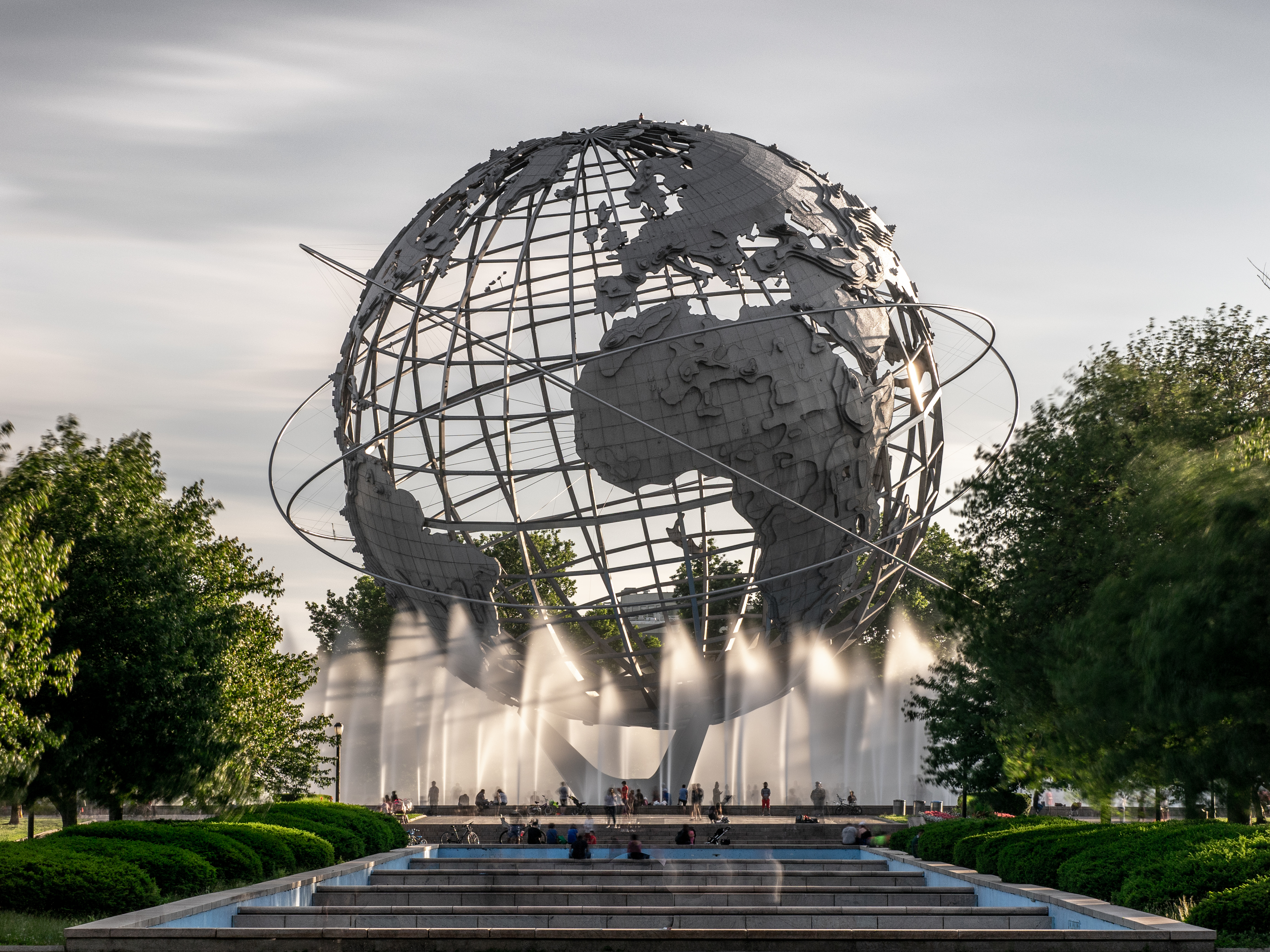
- The Unisphere with its fountains and spectators

- Location within New York City Location within New York Location within the United States
- 40°44′47″N 73°50′42″W
- Type: Steel structure
- Location: Flushing Meadows–Corona Park; Queens, New York, U.S.

History
- Dedicated: March 1964; 62 years ago
- Built: 1963–64
- Built for: 1964 New York World's Fair

Site notes
- Height: 140 feet (43 m)
- Architect(s): Gilmore David Clarke (landscape architect); Peter Muller-Munk Associates (industrial designers)
- Sculptor: American Bridge Company
- Restored: 1993–94, 2010
- Governing body: New York City Department of Parks and Recreation

New York City Landmark
- Designated: May 16, 1995
- Reference no.: 1925

The Unisphere is a spherical stainless steel representation of the Earth at Flushing Meadows–Corona Park in Queens, New York City, United States. The globe was designed by Gilmore D. Clarke for the 1964 New York World's Fair. Commissioned to celebrate the beginning of the space age, the Unisphere was conceived and constructed as the theme symbol of the World's Fair. The theme of the World's Fair was "Peace Through Understanding", and the Unisphere represented the theme of global interdependence, being dedicated to "Man's Achievements on a Shrinking Globe in an Expanding Universe".

Clarke devised plans for the Unisphere while aboard an airplane in 1960. New York City Department of Parks and Recreation commissioner Robert Moses, who had already rejected two plans for iconic structures at the 1964 fair, approved Clarke's proposal in early 1961. After further refinements, the Unisphere was constructed by American Bridge Company, a division of U.S. Steel, from March to August 1963. Over 51 million people visited the Unisphere during the World's Fair, after which it became a permanent attraction of Flushing Meadows–Corona Park. The Unisphere became an unofficial symbol of Queens after the World's Fair. In the 1970s, the Unisphere was not maintained and became visibly dirty; it was restored in the early 1990s. The Unisphere was made a New York City designated landmark in 1995 and, after another period of disrepair, it was restored in the early 2010s.

The Unisphere measures 140 feet (43 m) high and 120 feet (37 m) in diameter. It sits atop a 20-foot-tall (6.1 m) tripod base with over 500 steel pieces representing the countries, as well as three steel rings representing the first artificial satellites orbiting Earth. Around the Unisphere is a reflecting pool measuring 310 feet (94 m) in diameter, surrounded by 48 pairs of fountainheads.

== History ==
Flushing Meadows–Corona Park, a former ash dump in the New York City borough of Queens, was used for the 1939/1940 New York World's Fair. At the conclusion of the fair, it was used as a park. The Flushing Meadows site was selected in 1959 for the 1964 New York World's Fair. Gilmore David Clarke and Michael Rapuano, designers of the original World's Fair layout, were retained to tailor the original 1939 park layout for the new fair. New York City parks commissioner Robert Moses was president of the World's Fair Corporation, which leased the park from the city until 1967, after the fair's completion.

=== Planning ===
After the 1964 fair was announced, Moses wished to make a symbol that represented the fair's theme of "Peace Through Understanding", which would also have some "significance or meaning for the average person". The symbol would also celebrate the beginning of the space age. Moses first asked designer Walter Dorwin Teague to make a "Theme Center". Teague designed the center as a 170-foot-tall (52 m) inverted cone surrounded by a spiral, rising from a reflecting pool. Moses declined the proposal, calling it a "cross between a part of a brake engine and a bed spring, or should I say between a Malayan Tapir and a window shutter". Another proposal was devised by Paul Rudolph on behalf of the Portland Cement Association. This plan called for a saucer measuring 300 feet (91 m) in diameter and tilted 18 degrees from the ground, with a restaurant, exhibits, educational and recreational facilities, and "planetary viewing stations". Moses also rejected Rudolph's proposal.

The idea for the Unisphere occurred in September 1960 as Clarke was doodling on an airplane from Ohio to New York. Clarke had sketched a metal armillary on the rear of an envelope. By the time he got to his office, Clarke had refined his plan into a revolving globe with rings of latitude and longitude. Clarke asked another architect working under his office, William S. Boice, to sketch the structure. Since the method of the sculpture's revolution had not yet been determined, Boice drew fountains to conceal the base. The Unisphere was conceptually designed in aluminum with metallic mesh continents. The globe would be tilted 23.5 degrees and would measure 160 feet (49 m) across. Capital cities would be represented on the globe by three sizes of lights, with larger lights for capitals deemed more important. Clarke showed the plan to Moses, who approved of it.

Moses announced plans for the Unisphere in February 1961. The Unisphere would be erected at the site of the Perisphere of the 1939 World's Fair which was dismantled after the Fair, Moses commented that he "never understood" the Perisphere and its Trylon. According to Moses, the Unisphere "illustrates, symbolizes and embodies man's achievements on a shrinking globe in an expanding universe". The structure was to be constructed by American Bridge Company, a division of U.S. Steel. Further refinements were made by another of Clarke's architects, Peter Martecchini, who decided to place three columns at the globe's pedestal after playing with a rubber ball belonging to one of his sons. Martecchini developed a working model for a moving platform, composed of three pegs, each topped by a pair of metal disks and a toothed disk with a bolt, supporting a plywood platform. A model of the proposed work was unveiled in 1962.

Clarke's idea underwent a further refined industrial design in stainless steel by industrial designers at Peter Muller-Munk Associates. Some of the original design details were controversial. Several landmasses such as Cyprus and Crete had been left out of the original design, and the lights representing capital cities were criticized on the grounds that the process of selecting "important" capitals was subjective. U.S. Steel rejected the idea of a spinning globe due to high costs, though it did retain Martecchini's idea of a three-pointed pedestal. In addition, the globe was reduced from 150 to 120 feet (46 to 37 m) after Clarke talked with U.S. Steel's board chairman Roger Blough, who said the globe would only be as high as a ten-story brick building outside his office. The final design was similar to the original, but the fountains were arranged differently.

=== Construction and World's Fair ===
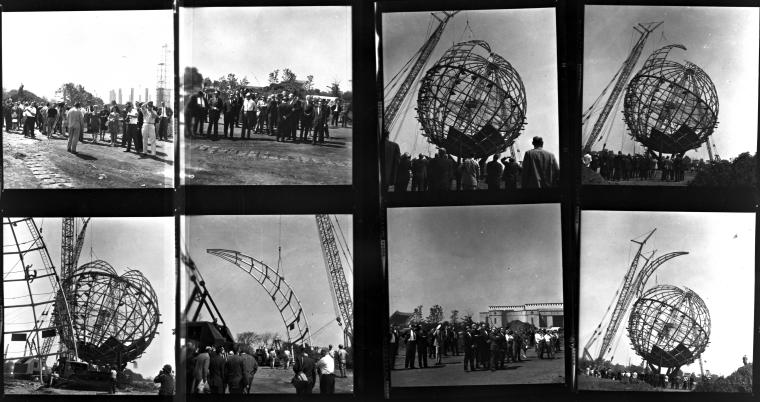
The Unisphere under construction in the 1960s

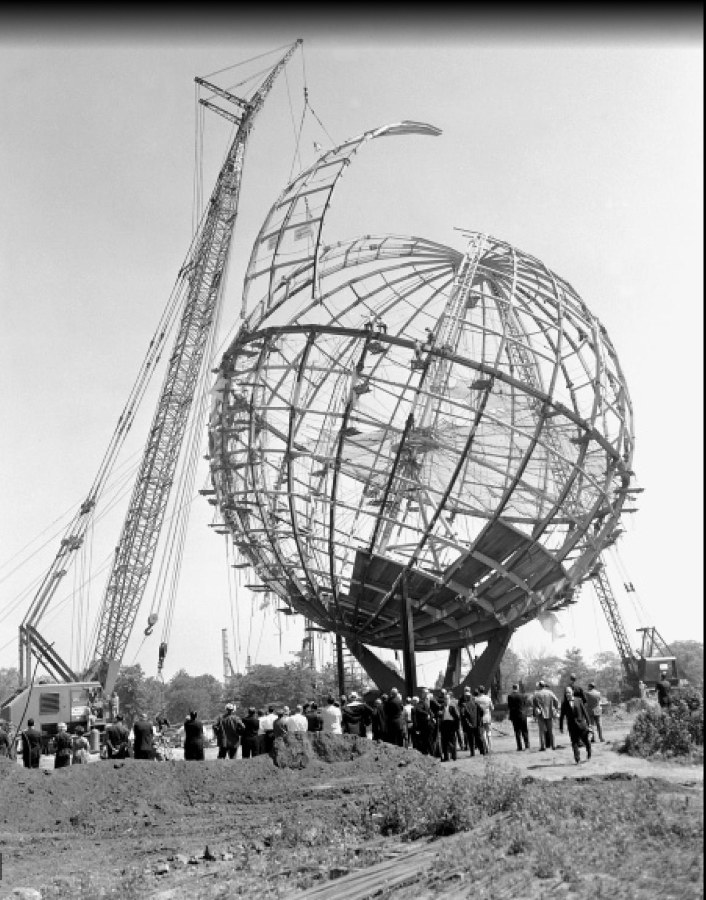
A crane eases the last segment of the Unisphere into place to complete the structure

Construction on the Unisphere started on March 6, 1963. The globe was built within 110 days, and the last landmass was installed on August 13, 1963. When the Unisphere was being built, Blough took credit for the structure. He also gave an award to M. Legrain-Eiffel, whose grandfather Gustave Eiffel's company had designed and built the Eiffel Tower. The Unisphere was dedicated in early March 1964, and the base of the Unisphere hosted a dance ball the same month, attended by four hundred people. U.S. Steel constructed the Unisphere for free; as compensation, the company's name was placed on marketing materials throughout the fair.

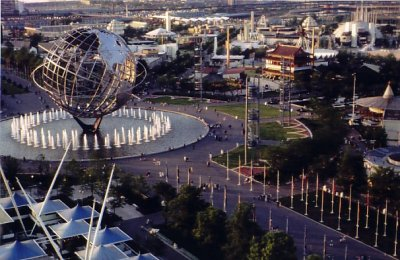
The Unisphere during the 1964–1965 World's Fair

The globe became the icon of the 1964 World's Fair. A special commemorative stamp issue was issued starting in April 1964, depicting fair attractions such as the Unisphere. The globe was also depicted on media and souvenirs promoting the fair. The Unisphere's popularity was also increased by the presence of fountainheads around the globe's base, which cooled down fair visitors on hot days. During the fair, dramatic lighting at night gave the effect of sunrise moving over the surface of the globe. Additionally, the capitals of nations were marked by lights. One of these lights is placed at the location of the Kahnawake First Nations reserve, which the Mohawk ironworkers requested to be placed there to honor their labor. Over the course of the fair, many of its 51 million visitors passed by the Unisphere.

=== 1960s to 1990s ===
In March 1966, after the conclusion of the fair, U.S. Steel donated $100,000 to make the Unisphere a permanent attraction at Flushing Meadows–Corona Park. These funds were allocated toward a lighting system for the globe, as well as a water-recirculation system for the pools. The park was reopened the next year following a major renovation, and the Unisphere was permanently retained as a park feature. At first, the park was lightly used, and a Newsday article in 1969 reported that the fountains at the Unisphere had been turned off. The globe was covered in grime by the 1970s, while the pools were shut off and tagged with graffiti. In 1978, the US Open tennis tournament was moved from the West Side Tennis Club in Forest Hills to Flushing Meadows–Corona Park. Parts of the park were repaired or expanded for the tournament, including the fountains of the Unisphere, which were reactivated in 1978 for the first time in ten years. In 1983, officials celebrated the 300th anniversary of Queens's founding at the base of the Unisphere.

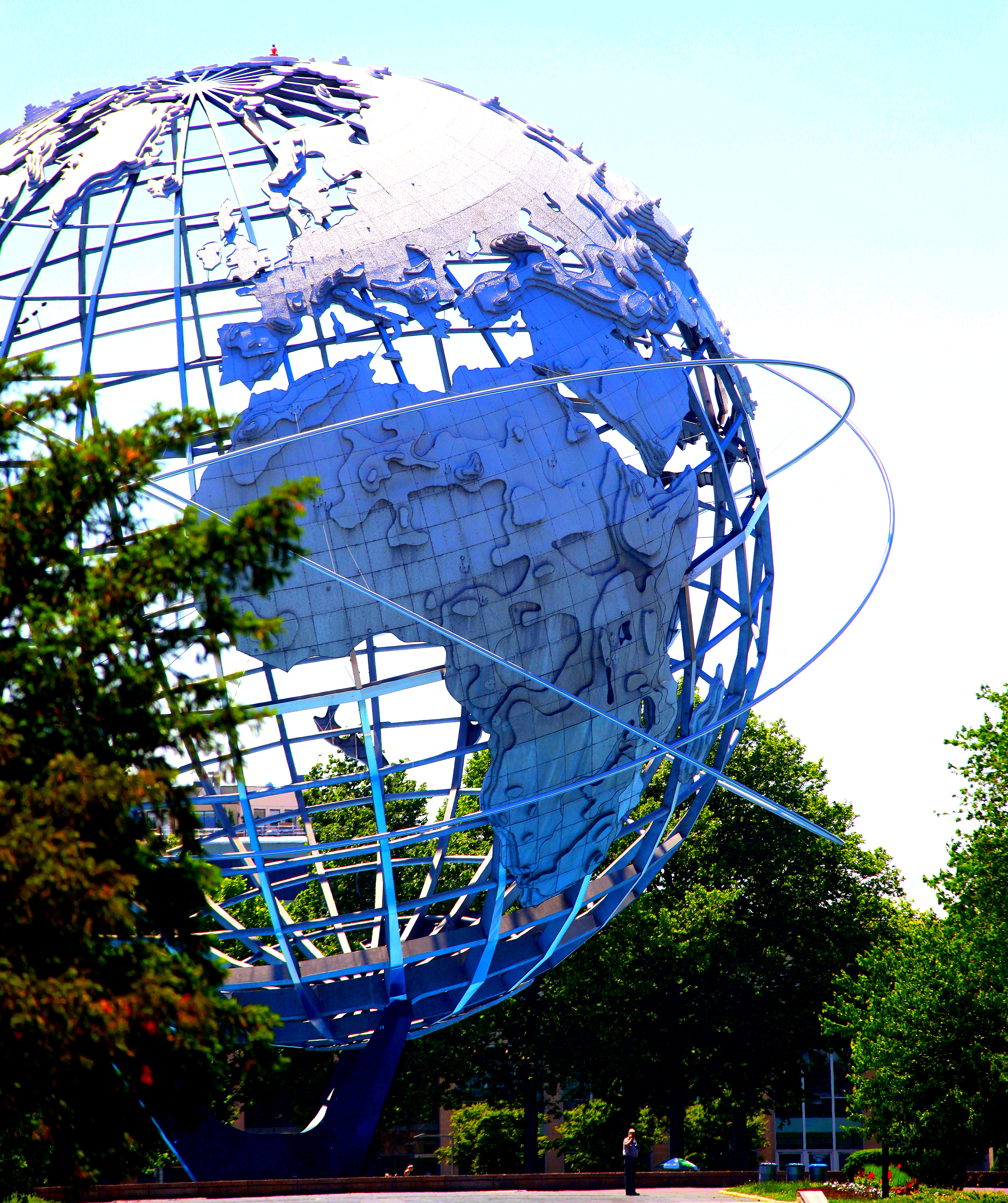
Close-up of Africa

Arne Abramowitz became administrator of Flushing Meadows–Corona Park in 1986 and soon began planning a renovation of the park. The following year, the New York City Department of Parks and Recreation (NYC Parks) announced an $80 million rehabilitation of the park. The renovation had been planned since the early 1980s but had been deferred due to a lack of funding. By this time, the city was shutting off the Unisphere's fountains during festivals to prevent people from wading into them. The restoration called for new mechanical systems, lighting, retaining walls, benches, paving, and trees to be installed in Unisphere Plaza at a cost of between $5.7 and $5.9 million. A second phase would landscape the surrounding grounds for $40 million. By 1989, a NYC Parks official observed that landmasses of countries like India and Vietnam would be lifted from their mountings on particularly windy days.

The grounds around the Unisphere were landscaped in 1992, but the renovation of the Unisphere itself was delayed due to a lack of money. Preservationists objected when some of the trees around the Unisphere, dating to the 1964 World's Fair, were removed and replaced with trees that were easier to maintain. The restoration of the Unisphere, which began in 1993, included numerous structural repairs and removal of grime accumulation on the steel. The fountains were replaced and new floodlighting was installed. Furthermore, two of the surrounding lawns were planted with rose gardens. As part of the park-wide renovation, the entrance of the Queens Museum, to the west, was relocated so it faced the Unisphere directly, rather than in the opposite direction. The restoration was completed in May 1994. Architectural critic Herbert Muschamp wrote that, while "nothing can compensate for the loss of context around this metallic centerpiece", the globe had started to gleam "with something like its former high spirits". That year, the Annual Building Awards in Queens gave the Unisphere an award for best rehabilitation.

In February 1995, several Queens residents petitioned to the New York City Landmarks Preservation Commission (LPC) to designate the Unisphere as an official city landmark. Although the structure was only thirty years old, one speaker said "its symbolism precedes its age". At the time, there were relatively few city landmarks in Queens compared to the total number of landmarks citywide, but other structures such as the Lewis H. Latimer House and Vander Ende–Onderdonk House were receiving landmark protection. The LPC designated the Unisphere as a landmark that May. Though the landmark status ensured the Unisphere's preservation, other relics of the 1939 and 1964 World's Fairs had become dilapidated or were being demolished at the same time.

=== 2000s to present ===
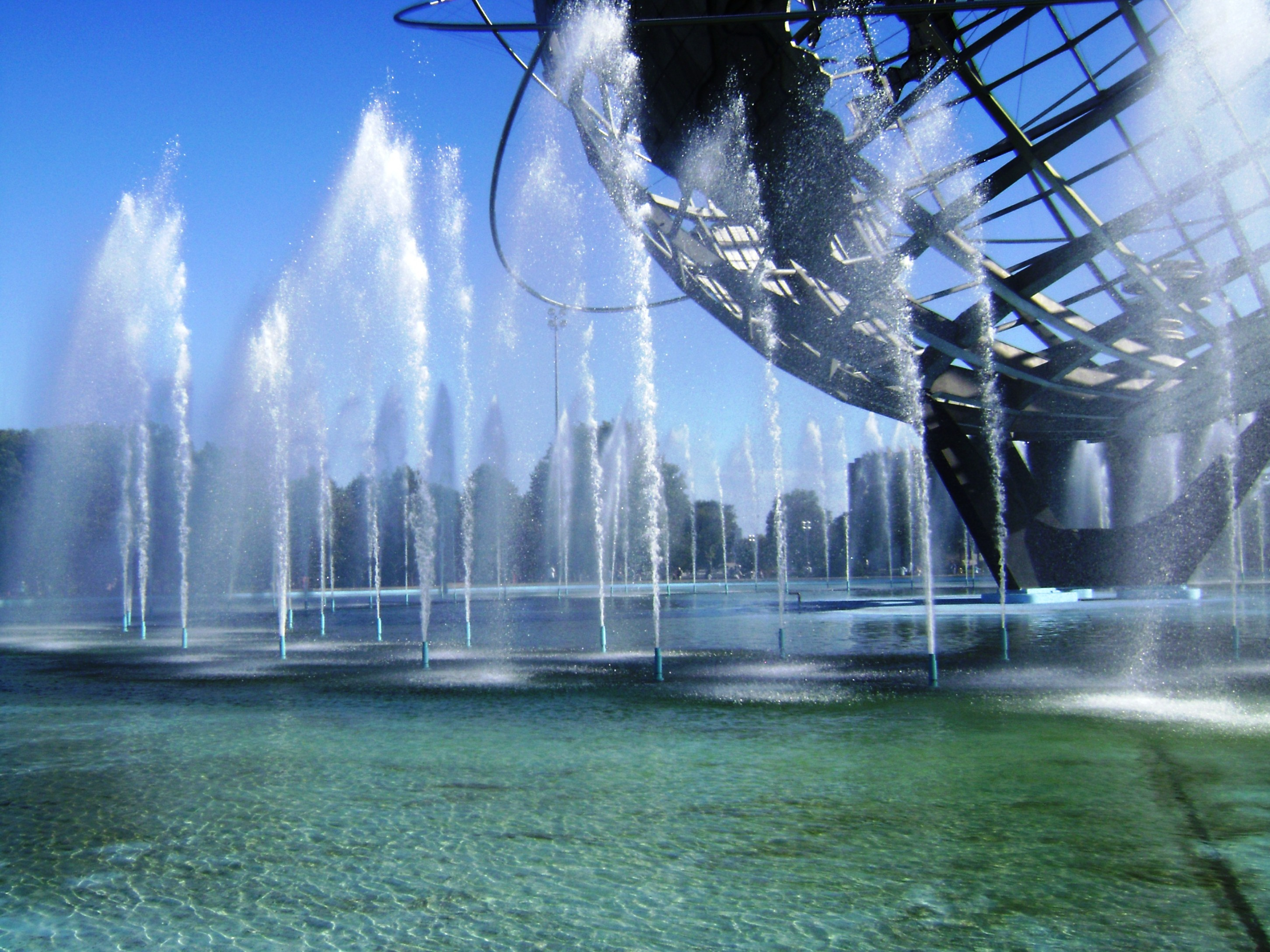
Fountains around the Unisphere

The fountains at the Unisphere's base were shut off in 2001 due to citywide water restrictions; they were not reactivated until early 2003, seventeen months later. The pool around the globe was also drained because Mayor Michael Bloomberg had prohibited water from being used for ornamental purposes. By 2008, city officials planned to fix the pipes under the Unisphere. At the time, the fountains leaked excessively; to save money, NYC Parks only operated the fountains throughout the day when the US Open was being held. Due to concerns by city officials that people would wade into the pools, some officials had proposed several years prior that the Unisphere be surrounded by a fence or bushes, but former parks commissioner Henry Stern had expressed opposition to such proposals. Local media reported in 2009 that grass had begun to grow within the steel mass representing Antarctica. NYC Parks officials suspected that bird feces and an accumulation of leaves had contributed to an environment in which seeds could germinate.

The Unisphere's fountains were rededicated on August 12, 2010, after a $2 million restoration of the pumps, valves, and paintwork. The refurbished fountains operated daily during the summer for the first time in more than two decades. In the September 2010 Brooklyn–Queens tornadoes, the landmass representing Sri Lanka was blown off the Unisphere. The piece was reinstalled the following year. After the fountains were turned back on, visitors often played within the pool and fountains, especially after a neighboring set of fountains to the east broke down. This was despite the fact that people were technically not allowed to enter the pool and fountains. To prevent people from being hurt by the powerful fountainheads, NYC Parks added barricades, opened fire hydrants, and hired patrol officers to deter people from going into the pool area. Even so, some people still entered the pool area. NYC Parks announced plans in 2018 for a mist garden just east of the Unisphere, within the Fountains of the Fairs; the mist garden was dedicated in 2020. Both the mist garden and the Unisphere's fountains were out of service by 2025 due to electrical issues.

== Design ==
=== Globe ===
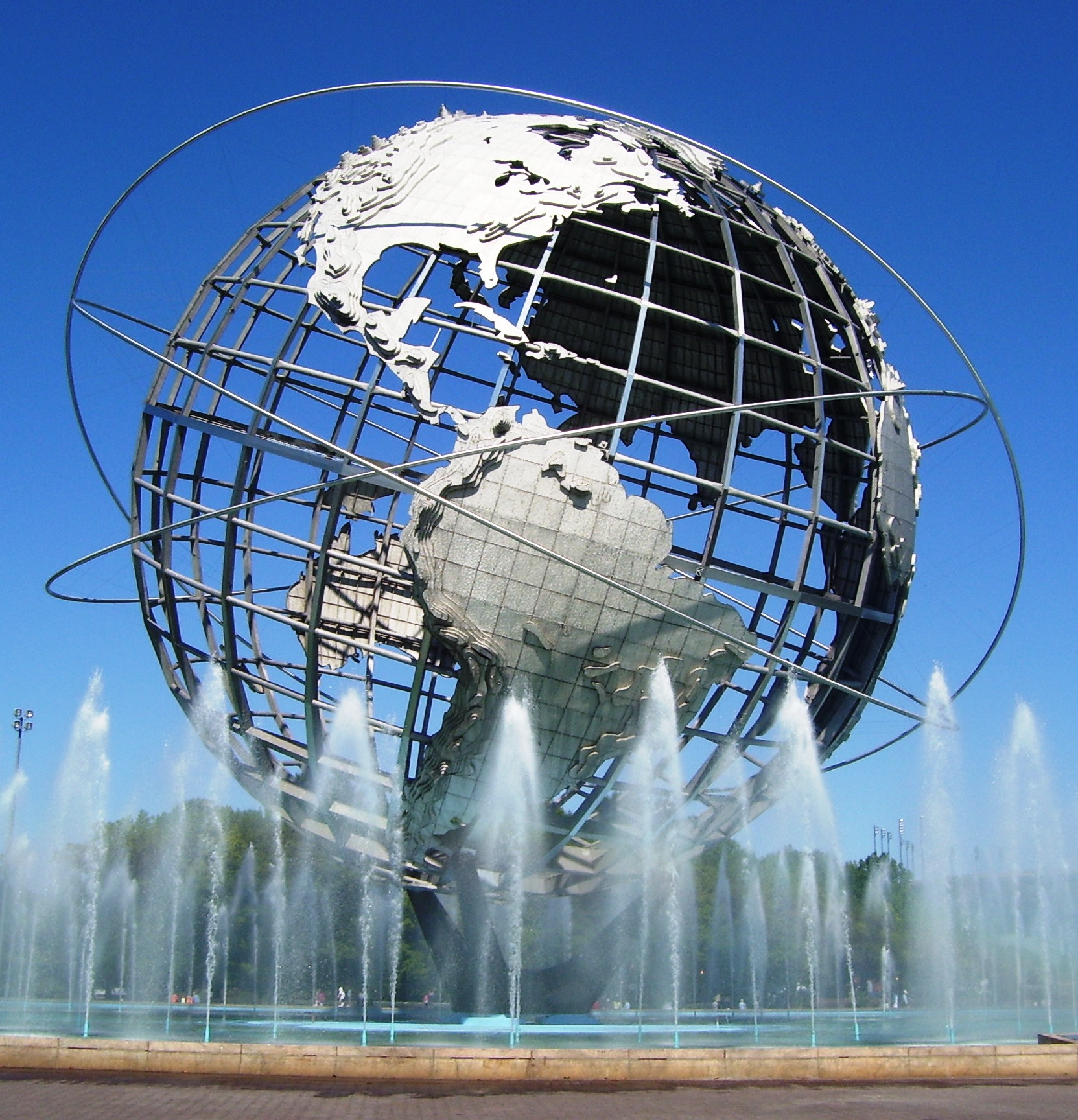
Seen in 2010

The Unisphere is the world's largest globe. It measures 120 feet (37 m) in diameter, rises 140 feet (43 m), and weighs 700,000 pounds (317,515 kg). Including its 100-short-ton (91 t) inverted tripod base, which is made of sturdy low-alloy steel, the Unisphere weighs 900,000 pounds (408,233 kg). The globe is constructed of Type 304L stainless steel. The continents on the globe are fabricated with a special texture-pattern by Rigidized Metals Corporation. The horizontal beams on the frame are meant to represent longitude lines. Over five hundred pieces of steel were used in the construction of the globe. The Unisphere is tilted at an angle of 23.5 degrees, which is the angle of the Earth's equatorial plane to the plane of its orbit about the sun.

Three large orbit rings of stainless steel encircle the Unisphere at various angles. These orbit rings are believed to represent the tracks of Yuri Gagarin, the first man in space; John Glenn, the first American to orbit Earth; and Telstar, the first active communications satellite. The early design was to have a ring for each of a dozen satellites in place at the time of the World's Fair. This proved impractical, not only in the number of satellites but also in the height of their orbits and the fact that geostationary satellites had no orbit path. As a result, a symbolic number of three was chosen for aesthetic reasons. The three rings were connected with aircraft cable to the rest of the structure. Another proposal entailed having lights revolve around the satellite rings, but this idea was also decided against.

The landmasses of the Unisphere are made of metal sheets that are laid in contours. The shapes had to be placed at regular intervals while also accurately representing the globe, and could not be cross-braced or overly thick; furthermore, wind was trapped by the shapes' concave inner surfaces. As such, a stress transfer pattern was developed, and the meridians and parallels were varied in dimension, thereby making the Unisphere structurally stable as well as accurate in design. U.S. Steel's administrative vice president Austin J. Paddock said that some 670 mathematical equations needed to be solved simultaneously to determine the exact layout of the Unisphere. The shape of the steel sheets was devised using a computer. The surface area of the landmasses totals over 13,000 square feet (1,200 m^{2}), effectively acting as a large sail.

=== Base ===
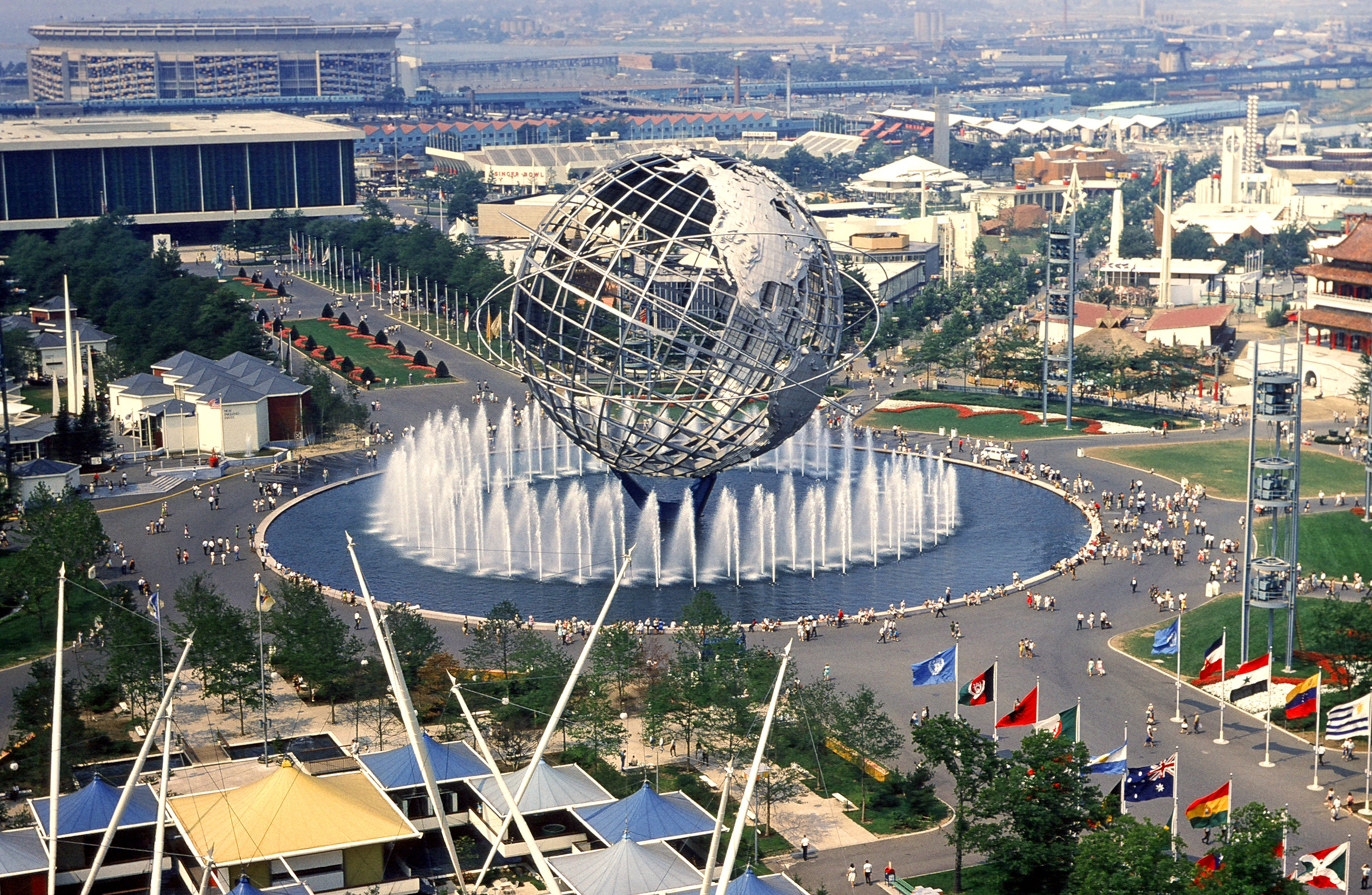
The Unisphere and surrounding areas in 1964

The Unisphere is centered in a 310-foot-diameter (94 m) circular reflecting pool, with a floor of poured concrete surrounded by a bulkhead of granite and concrete. Forty-eight pairs of fountainheads, on the outer edge of the pool, are designed to obscure its tripod pedestal. Prior to the 1990s renovation, there were 48 single fountainheads. Two pumps in the pool recycle the water that is used in the fountainheads. From the perimeter of the reflecting pool, the Unisphere depicts the Earth from a perspective 4,000 miles (6,400 km) away.

The Unisphere is built on a concrete foundation, which includes the piling ring that supported the Perisphere of the 1939 World's Fair. The marshy soil of Flushing Meadows needed special consideration during the original 1937 Perisphere construction. The Perisphere, and subsequently the Unisphere, employed a foundation of 528 pressure-creosoted Douglas fir piles of 95 to 100 feet (29 to 30 m) in length. Before construction of the Unisphere, three piles were tested for structural integrity and all were found to be sound throughout their entire length. Six hundred additional piles were built specifically for the Unisphere.

=== Surroundings ===
Attractions and geographical features of Flushing Meadows–Corona Park
Attractions and geographical features of Flushing Meadows–Corona Park:
1 Citi Field
2 Etihad Park (under construction)
3 Flushing Meadows Carousel and Queens Zoo
4 Flushing Meadows Corona Park Aquatics Center
5 Flushing River and Creek
6 Meadow Lake and Hong Kong Dragon Boat Festival
7 Metropolitan Park (planned) and Shea Stadium (demolished)
8 Mets–Willets Point subway station
9 Mets–Willets Point LIRR station
10 National Tennis Center and United States Pavilion (demolished)
11 New York Hall of Science
12 New York State Pavilion and Queens Theatre
13 Queens Botanical Garden
14 Queens Museum
15 Queens Night Market
16 Terrace on the Park
17 Unisphere
18 Willow Lake
19 World's Fair subway station (demolished)

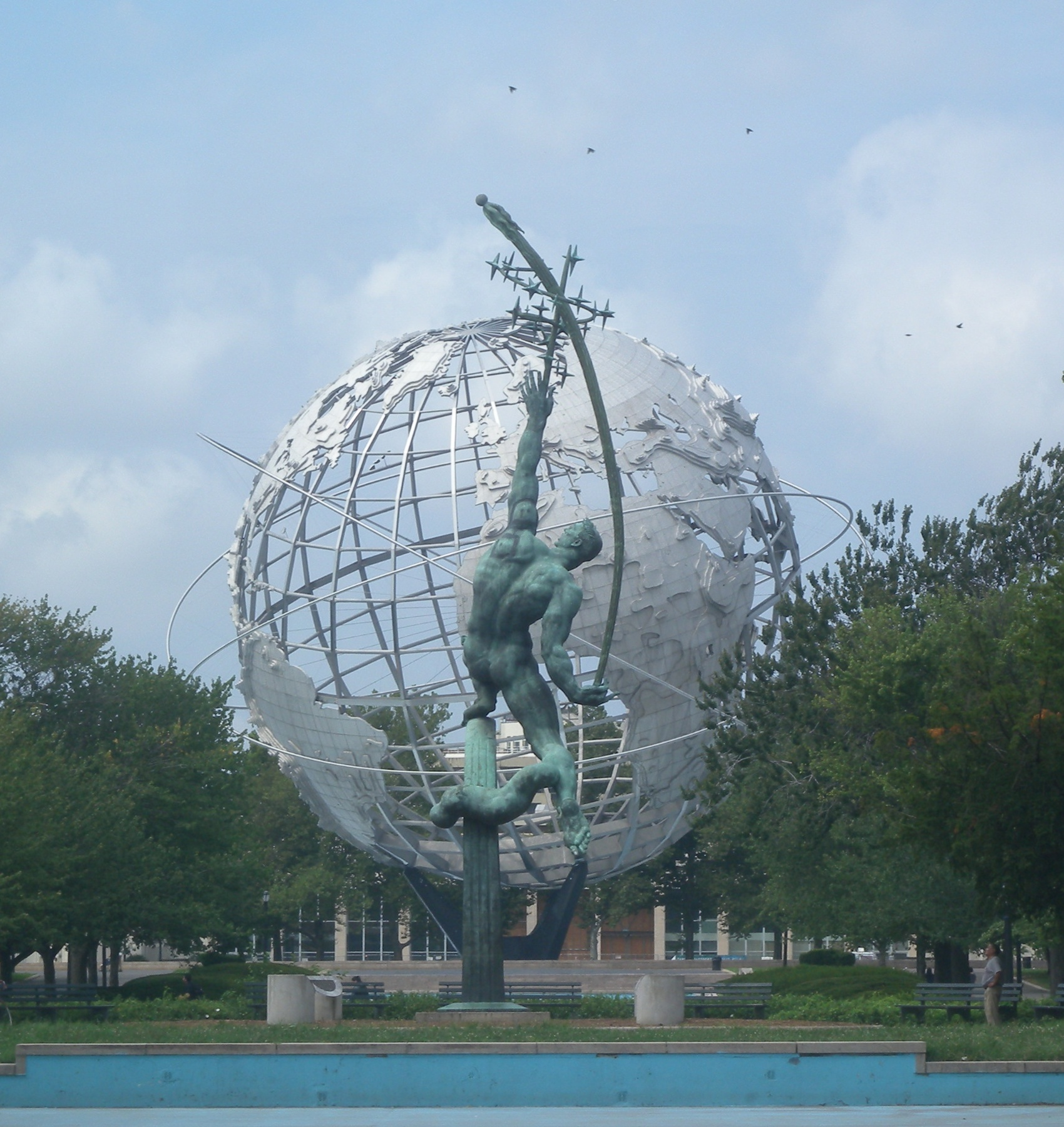
The Unisphere and nearby Rocket Thrower sculpture by Donald De Lue

Pathways radiate axially from the Unisphere to the north, northeast, southeast, and south. There are plaques facing the four major paths that extend from the Unisphere. The courts of the former Louis Armstrong Stadium, to the north, had been oriented along the same axis as the Unisphere. Additionally, a pair of promenades extend east of the Unisphere, with the Fountains of the Fairs between the paths. The entrance to the Queens Museum is directly west of the Unisphere, while the Billie Jean King National Tennis Center is to the north and the New York State Pavilion is to the south.

== Impact ==
=== Reception ===
When it was proposed, the Unisphere received negative reviews. The Village Voice quoted people who called it "probably one of the most uninspired designs we have ever seen", while Newsday opined that the globe was "deathly dull" and "looks like an ad for Western Union". Oculus magazine criticized the design as "a heavy, literal version of the ancient armillary sphere, with decoration by Rand McNally". Ralph Caplan wrote for Industrial Design that Moses's defense of the Unisphere was motivated by animosity toward the older structure. Progressive Architecture described it as "like the set for the 'spectacular' finale of a 1930s Warner Brothers musical". Walter McQuade wrote for The Nation that the Unisphere was a "bit of roadside inspirational decoration, a trite cartoon in iron" that portended badly for the 1964 World's Fair, while Bruno Zevi for Italian magazine L'Architettura cronache e storia called it a "silly idea" and petitioned U.S. President John F. Kennedy to prevent the Unisphere from being installed.

Only one positive criticism emerged when the globe was announced when the National Arts Club called it "one of the outstanding achievements in structural sculpture of this decade." Remarking on the initial negative reception of the Unisphere in 2010, The Wall Street Journal said that the Unisphere was perceived as a symbol of the "banal, corporate atmosphere" of the 1964 World's Fair. Despite the largely negative criticism of the Unisphere from architectural critics, it was positively received by the visitors. After the fair, the Unisphere remained a tourist attraction into the 21st century. The New York Times, in 2014, said the Unisphere was the only relic of the 1964 World's Fair that "was untarnished by time and enhanced by memory".

=== Symbolism and media ===
According to Smithsonian magazine, "The Unisphere became the space age logo of the fair, a steel Earth at the Ptolemaic hub of a Googie-style Jetsons universe", despite the overall limited success of the 1964 World's Fair. The Unisphere became an unofficial symbol of Queens after the World's Fair. In 1990, the office of the Queens borough president depicted the Unisphere in its insignia, and advertisements for Continental Airlines and Bloomingdale's also depicted the globe. By the mid-1990s, it was being shown in numerous commercials and as a part of several montages of New York City. One person interviewed by The New York Times, who depicted the Unisphere on her products, said that the Unisphere had become popular because "People have run out of symbols of New York".

The Unisphere has been used as a setting or backdrop for several media works, including the American sitcom The King of Queens; the television show CSI: NY; the Marvel Cinematic Universe films Iron Man 2, Captain America: The First Avenger, and Spider-Man: Homecoming; and the movie Men in Black. The Unisphere has been shown frequently in music videos, in particular those from the New York hip-hop scene, such as A Tribe Called Quest's "Award Tour"; Craig Mack's "Flava in Ya Ear"; and Puff Daddy, Mase, and The Notorious B.I.G’s "Mo Money, Mo Problems". It is also the subject of Seth Fein's documentary essay Between Neighborhoods.

=== Climbs ===
Several people have climbed the Unisphere throughout its history. In 1976, George Willig and Jery Hewitt scaled the structure for a short documentary made by New York University student Paul Hornstein, who had wanted "to prove that we can do a full-scale, high-quality movie production on our own". A member of the climate activist group Extinction Rebellion also climbed the Unisphere in September 2019 to hang a banner protesting the 2019 Amazon rainforest wildfires. At least two climbers have died after slipping from the Unisphere: a 23-year-old who fell from the side of the structure in 1976, and a man who fell into the globe in 1990.

== See also ==
- History of fountains in the United States
- List of New York City Designated Landmarks in Queens
- Rocket Thrower, nearby sculpture
