= Peter Muller-Munk Associates =

American industrial design firm

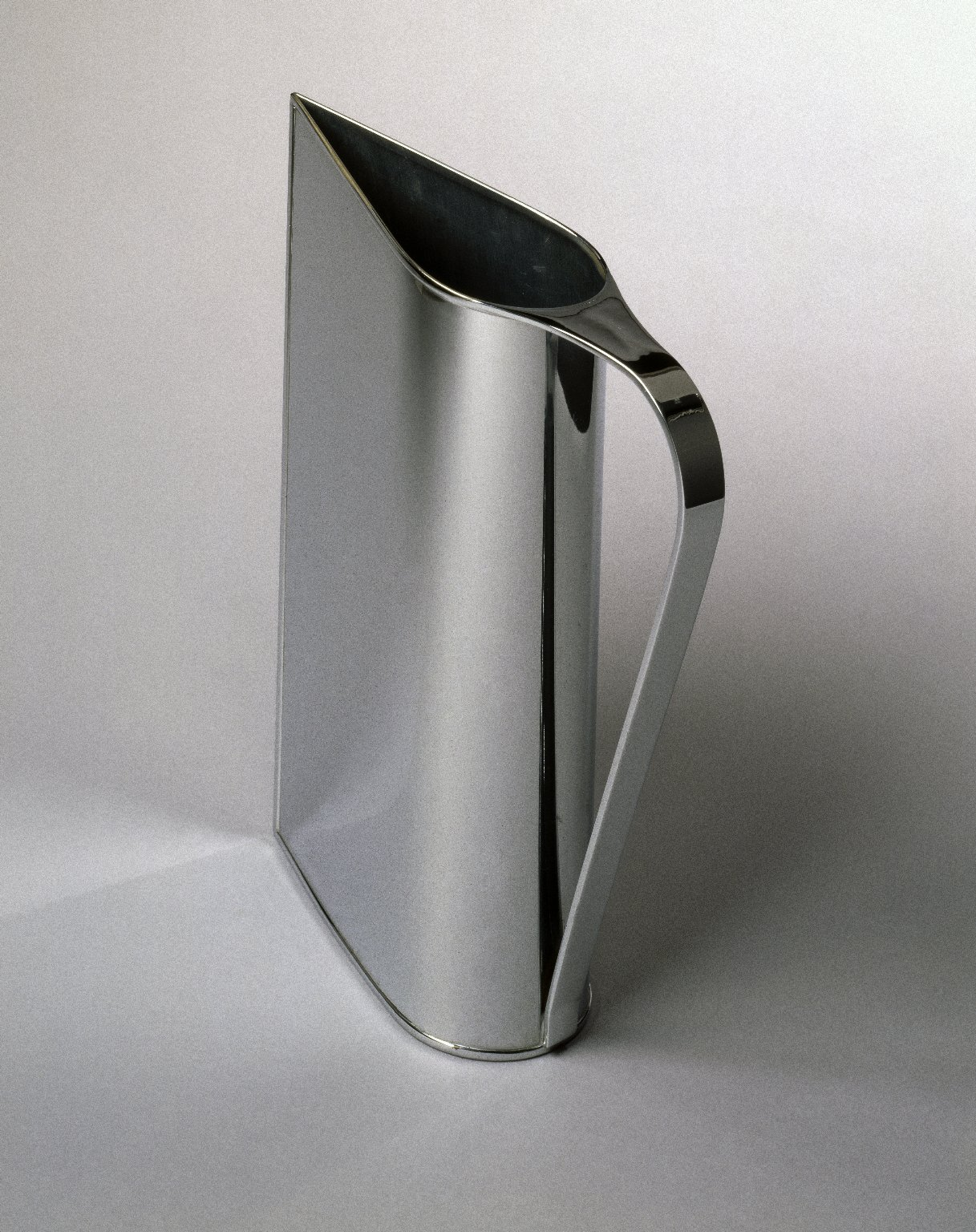
Revere Copper and Brass, Incorporated, Normandie Pitcher, 1935, chromium-plated brass.

Peter Muller-Munk Associates (known as PMMA) was an American industrial-design firm that flourished in Pittsburgh under the direction of its charismatic name partner. PMMA's work touched almost every aspect of industrial design and were especially influential in the realm of consumer goods. Notably, U.S. Steel hired PMMA to work on the general aesthetic design for the Unisphere, the theme center of the 1964 New York World's Fair.

== Peter Muller-Munk ==
The company's founder was born Klaus-Peter Wilhelm Müller on June 25, 1904, in a wealthy suburb of Berlin, in present-day Germany. He began his career crafting unique and custom silver objects before turning to industrial design. He emigrated to the United States in 1926 and launched his career as a metalworker at Tiffany & Co. in New York City. He moved to Pittsburgh in 1935 to accept a job at the Carnegie Institute of Technology as assistant professor in the first American university baccalaureate degree program in industrial design.

== History ==
In 1938 he opened his first consulting office in Pittsburgh with Robert Paul Karlen as his first employee. Clients had so expanded by 1945 that he found it necessary to resign from Carnegie Tech to devote himself to his business. At the time, he began operating under the name Peter Muller-Munk Associates with Karlen and Raymond Smith as associates. Anton Parisson became the fifth partner in 1957. In 1956 Ernst Budke became an associate of the firm. By 1960 there were five partners and six associates. PMMA's client list spanned the globe; local ones included the Pittsburgh Plate Glass Company, Westinghouse, and U.S. Steel.

After the death of its founder in 1967, PMMA continued to take work aligned with its expertise. Projects included vehicle design, a corporate identity for the new Three Rivers Stadium in Pittsburgh and a series of unique, eye-catching trolleys as a publicity campaign for Pittsburgh's Port Authority Transit (PAT) (now Port Authority of Allegheny County). Despite these successes, PMMA struggled in the years following Muller-Munk's death. By 1973, staff had been reduced to two officers and 20 employees. To adapt to the changing marketplace, PMMA management decided to merge with Wilbur Smith Associates on January 1, 1974, rendering Peter Muller-Munk Associates a division of WSA.

== Legacy ==
Despite Muller-Munk's own commercial success and his pioneering efforts to establish industrial design as a serious course of post-secondary study, PMMA's profile declined and almost disappeared into the history of modern design. Recently, interested in the firm's work has grown. In 2015 the Carnegie Museum of Art organized a monographic exhibition dedicated to the designer and his work, with the aim of supplementing design histories that traditionally focused almost exclusively on the American East and West Coasts.
