= Rocket Thrower =

1963 bronze statue by Donald De Lue

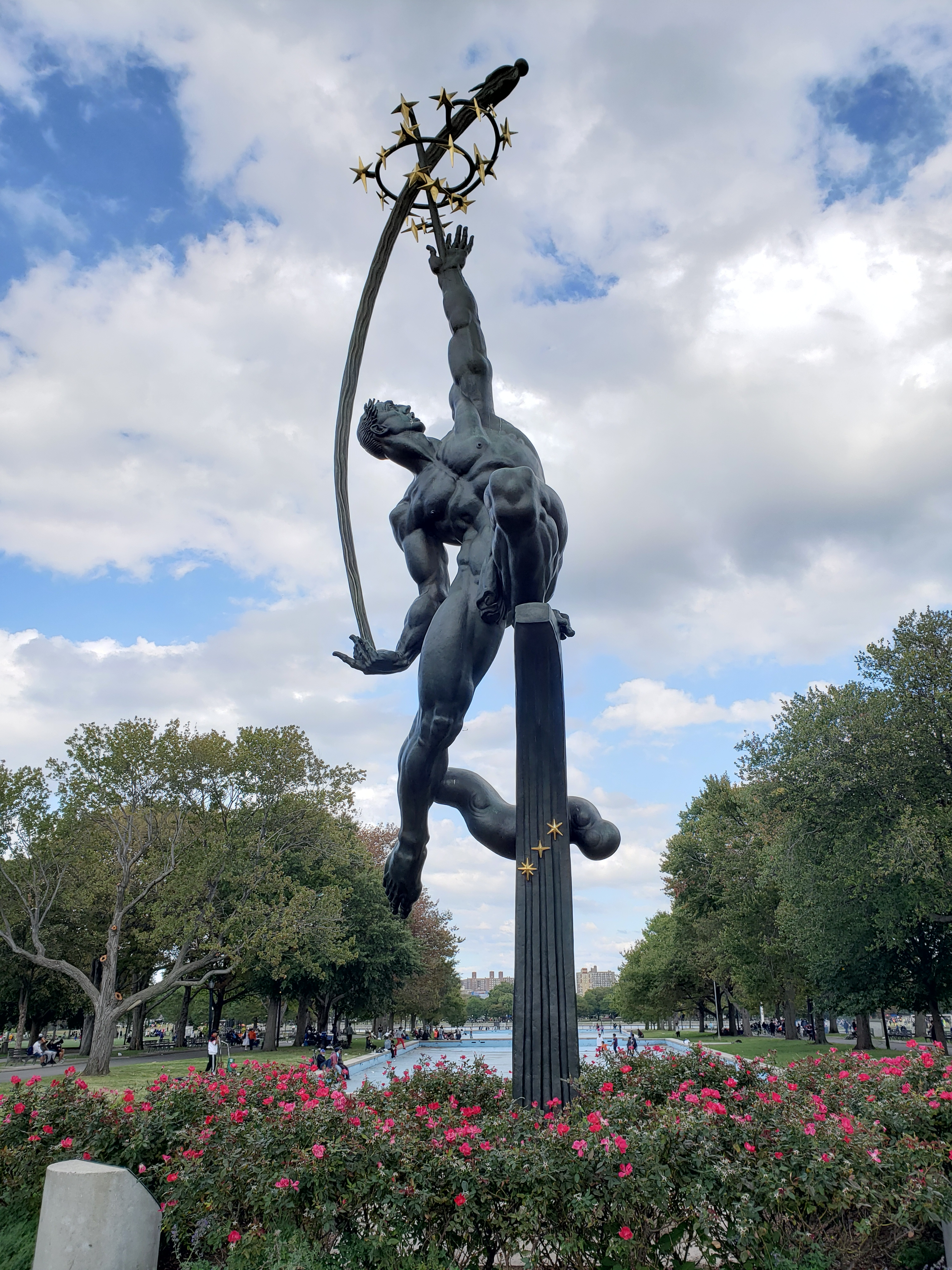
- The statue in 2020 (viewed from the southwest)
- Artist: Donald De Lue
- Year: 1963
- Type: Bronze sculpture
- Dimensions: 43 feet (13 metres) high
- Location: Flushing Meadows–Corona Park Queens, New York, United States; 40.7474°N 73.8421°W
- Owner: City of New York
- Website: Official website

Rocket Thrower is a 1963 bronze sculpture by American sculptor Donald De Lue. Created for the 1964 New York World's Fair, it is located in Flushing Meadows–Corona Park in Queens, New York City. De Lue was among a total of five sculptors who would create pieces for the fairground. He was contracted in 1962 for the amount of $105,000 with a deadline for completion of under six months. De Lue completed a full plaster model in 1963 at which time it was sent to Italy to be cast.

== Description ==
Rocket Thrower stands 43 feet (13 metres) high and depicts an athletic and god-like man launching, with his right hand, a small sphere into the sky which leaves an arcing trail of flames behind. His left hand is raised skyward and reaches for a swirl of stars which encircle the path of the rocket. Rocket Thrower's left leg strains and crouches with his left foot planted on an arched perch. His right leg extends out fluidly. On the front of the perch (facing the Unisphere) are three distinct stars arranged in an angled line across its short width.

Over time the statue has been affected by corrosion, and its structural integrity has diminished. One arm was repaired in 1989. The statue was significantly restored in 2013.

The structure's location is East of Unisphere in the Hall of Astronauts.

== Reception ==
When released, the critics of the time had mixed reviews of the work. De Lue explained the work as "the spiritual concept of man's relationship to space and his venturesome spirit backed up by all the powers of his intelligence for the exploration of a new dimension." However, The New York Times art critic John Canaday described it as "the most lamentable monster, making Walt Disney look like Leonardo Da Vinci."

== Gallery ==
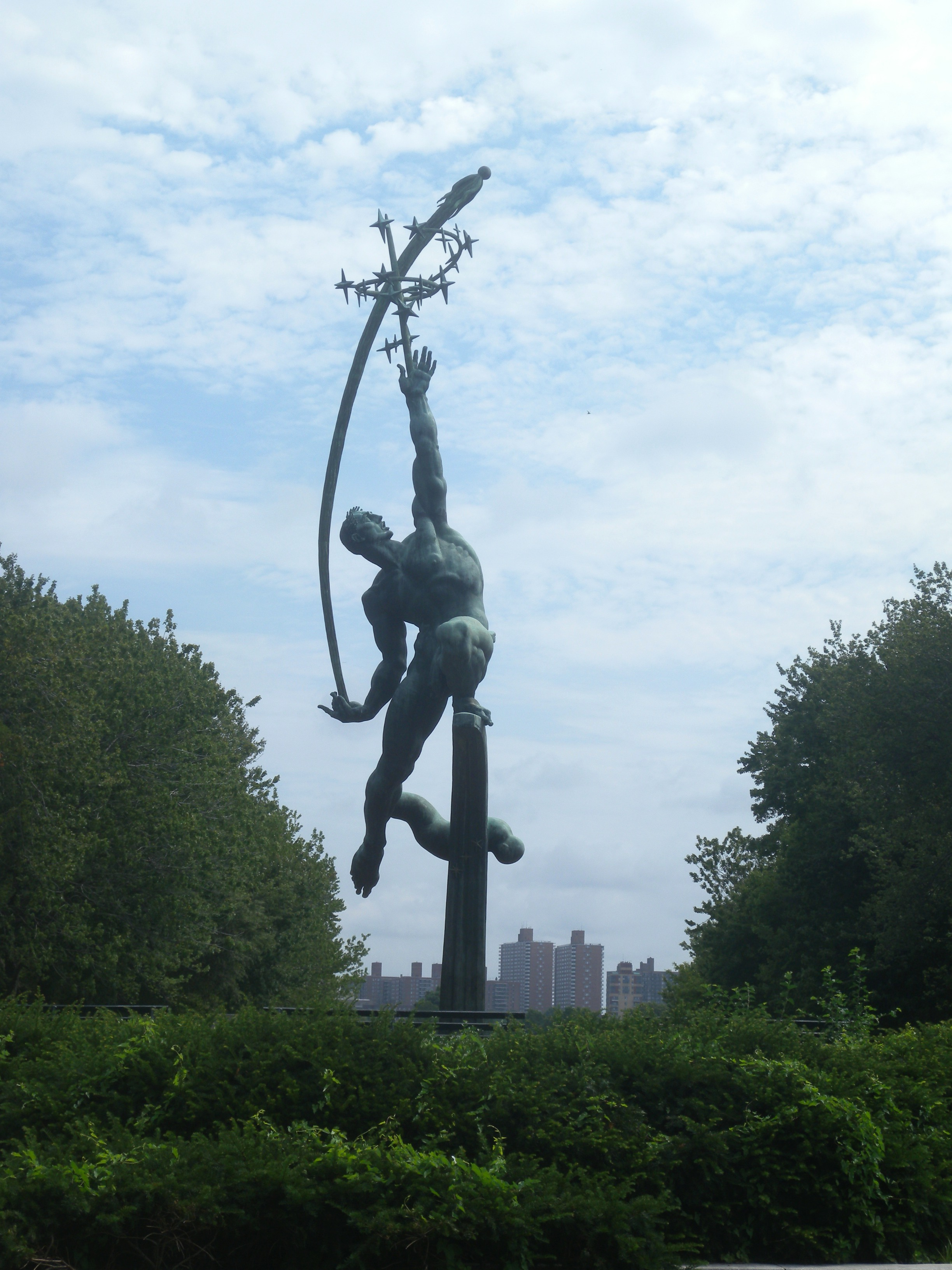
Southwestern side with view of Queens in the background

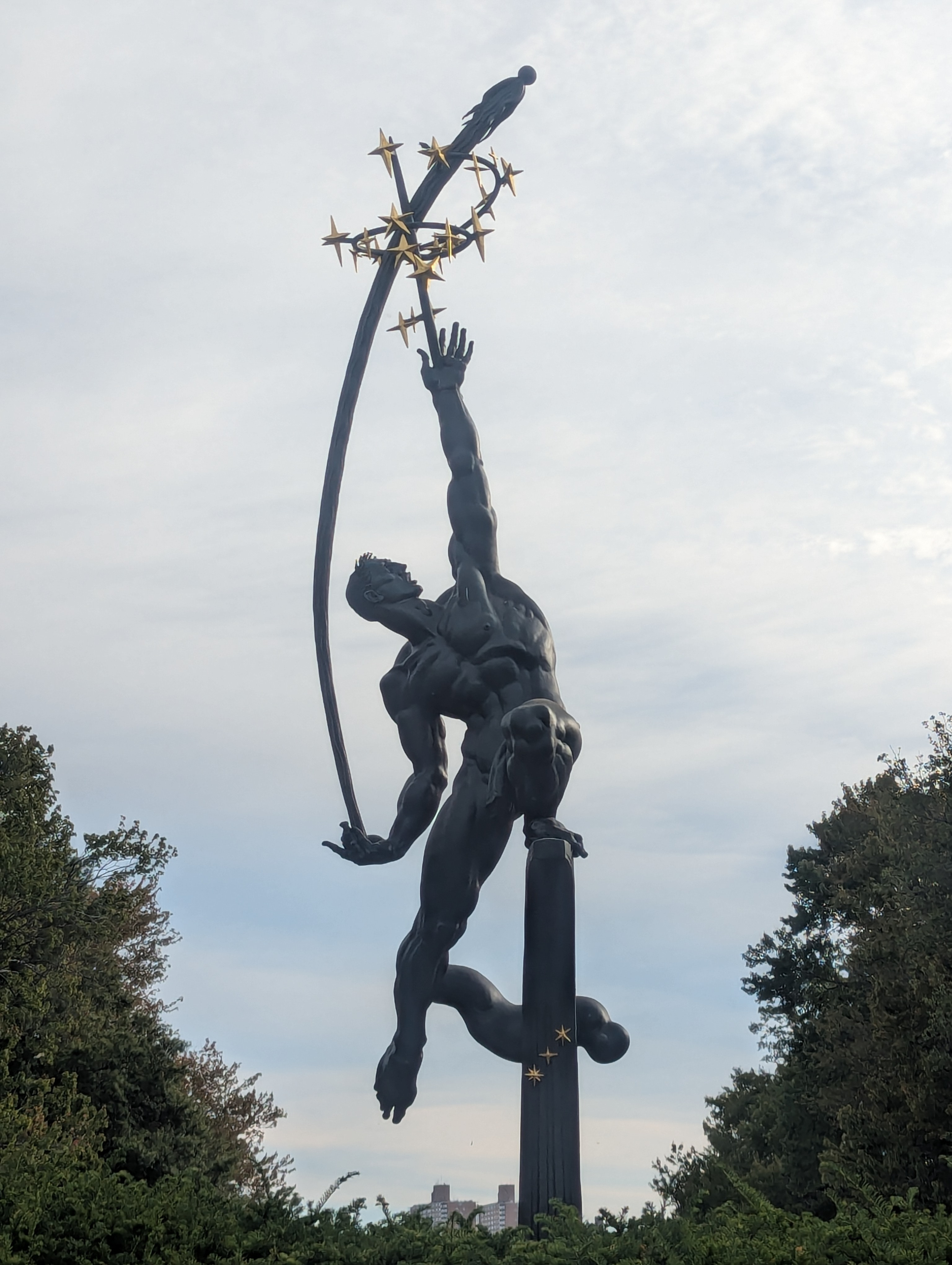
Southwestern view

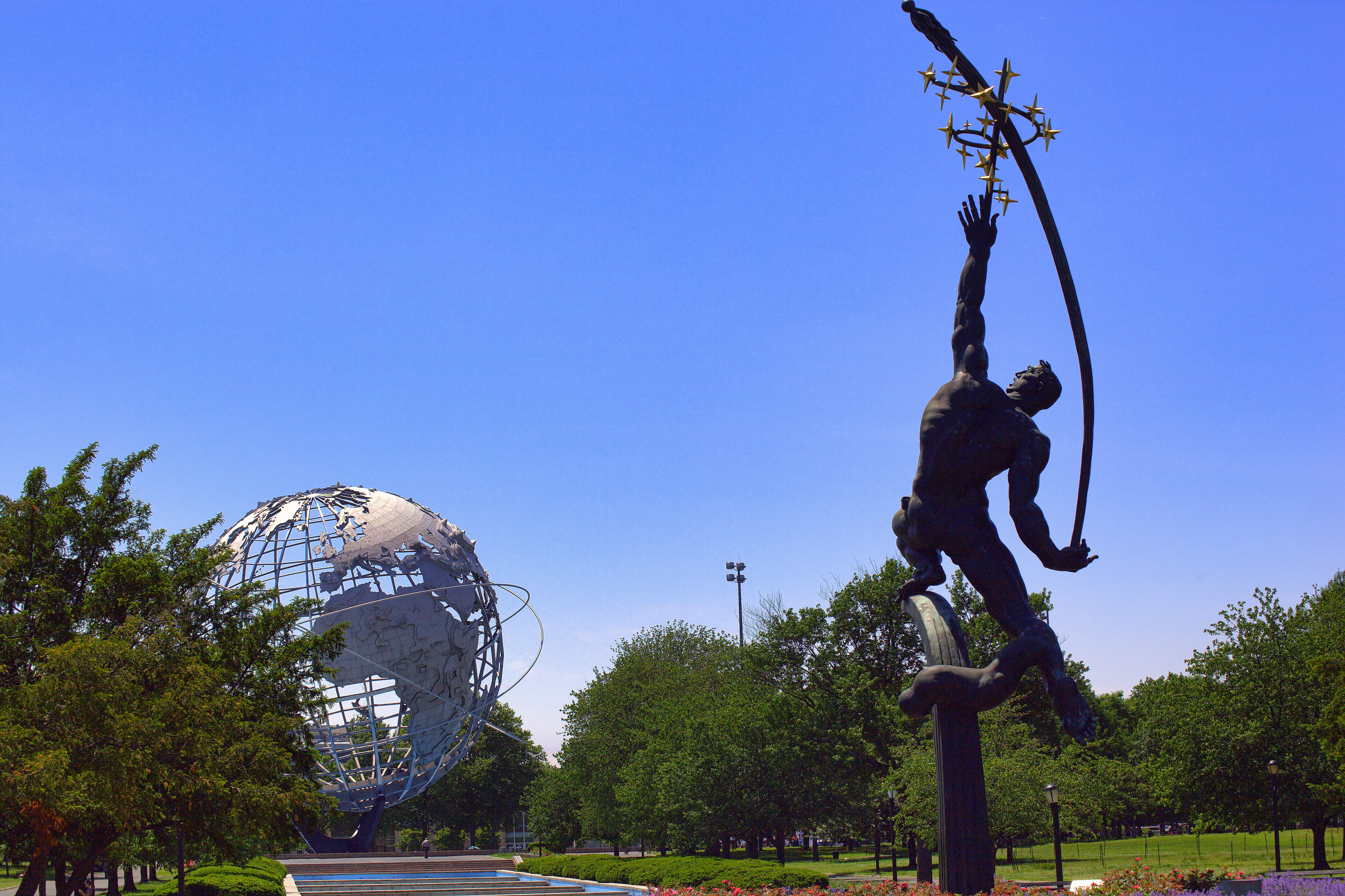
Another view of Rocket Thrower

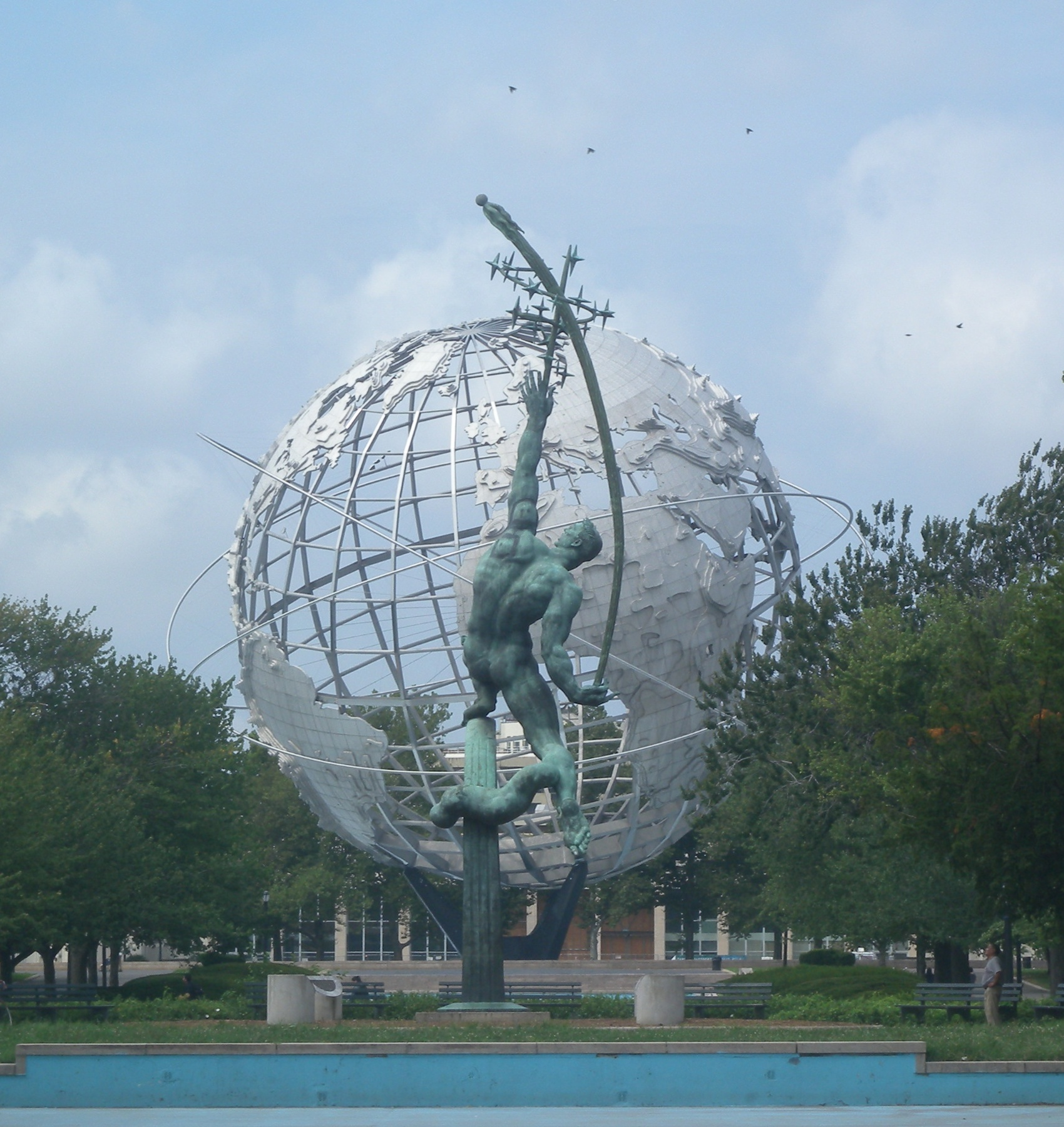
The piece with The Unisphere in the background

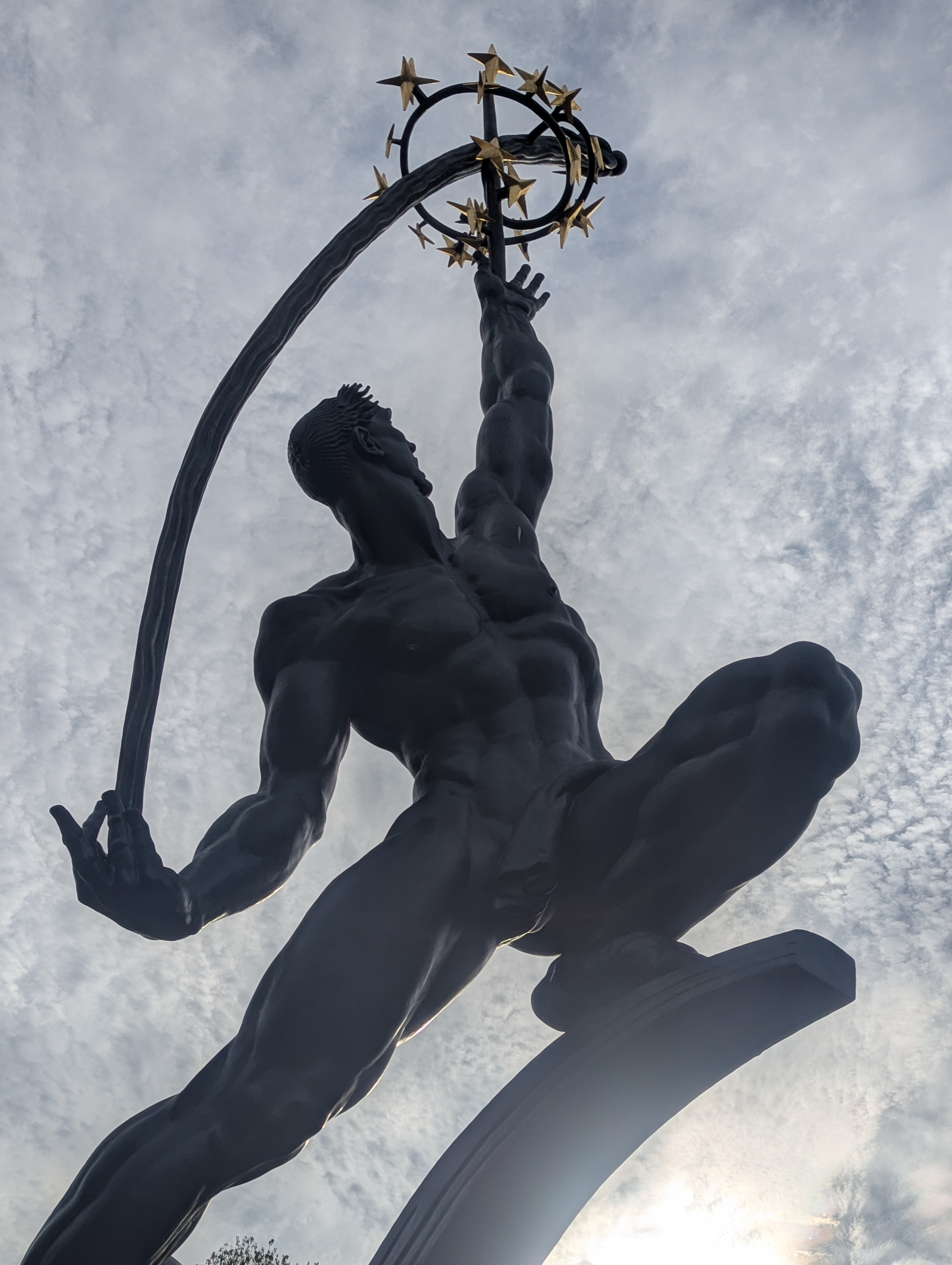
Seen from the base

== See also ==
- Outdoor sculpture in New York City
