= Boy Scout Commemorative Tribute =

Artwork by Donald De Lue

- Boy Scouts of America
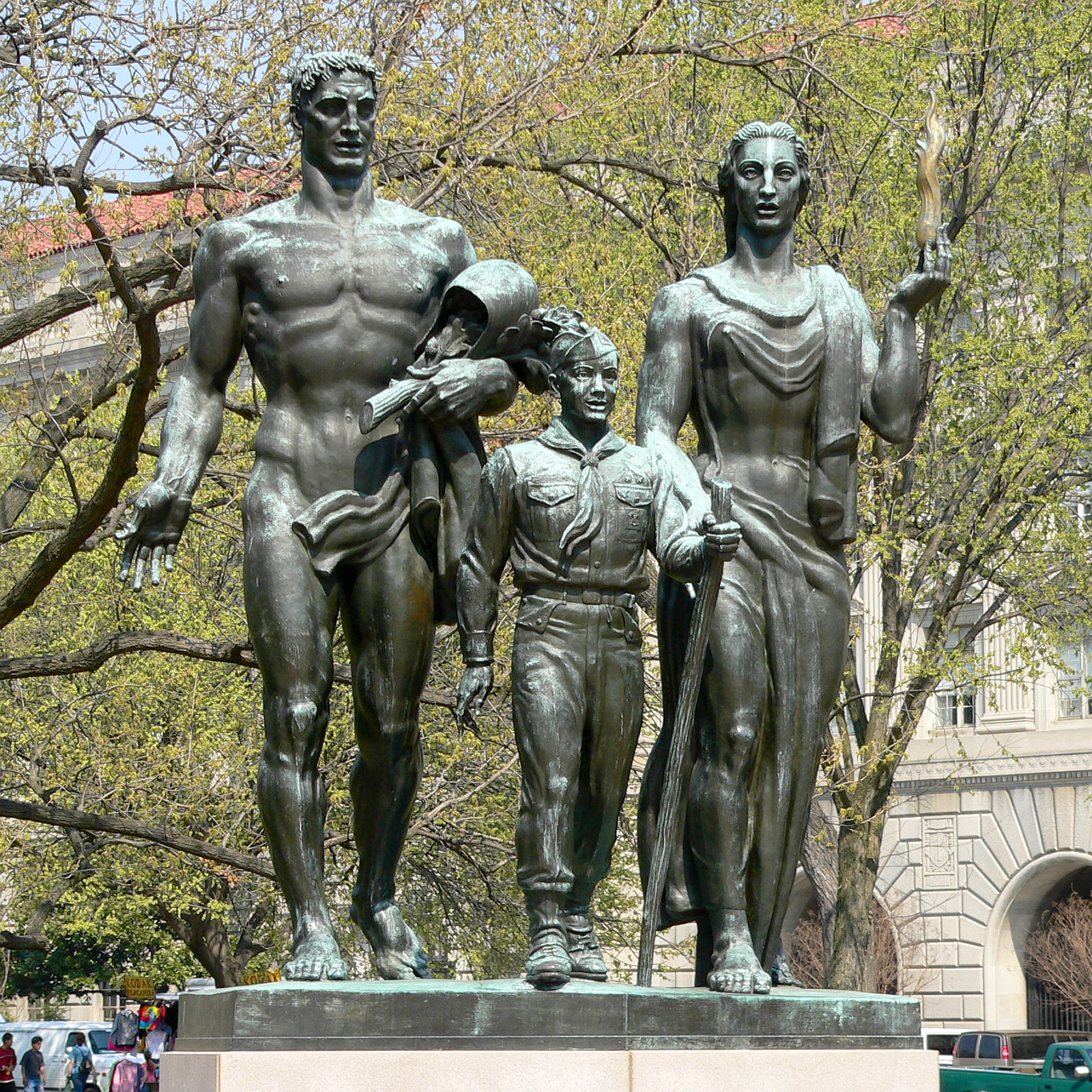
- Boy Scout Commemorative Tribute in 2006
- Artist: Donald De Lue
- Year: 1964
- Type: Bronze and granite
- Dimensions: 430 cm × 300 cm × 260 cm (168 in × 120 in × 104 in)
- Location: Washington, D.C., United States; 38°53′37.93″N 77°2′3.38″W
- Owner: National Park Service

The Boy Scout Commemorative Tribute is a 1964 public artwork by American sculptor Donald De Lue, located on The Ellipse within The White House and President's Park in Washington, D.C., United States. The monument and fountain are maintained by the National Park Service. Sometimes referred to as the Boy Scout Memorial or Boy Scout Fountain, the Boy Scout Commemorative Tribute serves as a monument to the Boy Scouts of America.

== Description ==
The sculpture consists of three bronze figures: a Boy Scout in the center wearing a uniform stepping forward and carrying a walking stick in his left hand. Flanking him are two larger allegorical figures of a man and woman. They represent "American Manhood and Womanhood and the ideals they will pass onto the youth." To the Boy Scout's right side is the male figure, nearly nude, who carries a bundle of leaves and drapery in his left arm. Part of the drapery blows across his middle as he strides forward with his right leg. To the Scout's left side is the female figure who holds a torch in her left hand that has a gold-colored flame. Her left hand extends slightly and her palm is facing upward and she strides forward on her right leg. The three figures are mounted on a hexagonal-shaped base (62 x 92 x 98 in.) and in front of the sculpture is a circular pool of water.

A panel on the base is inscribed with the Scout Oath:

On my honor I
Will do my best
To do my duty
To God & my
Country and to obey the
Scout law to
Help other people
At all times
To keep myself
Physically strong
Mentally awake
And morally
Straight

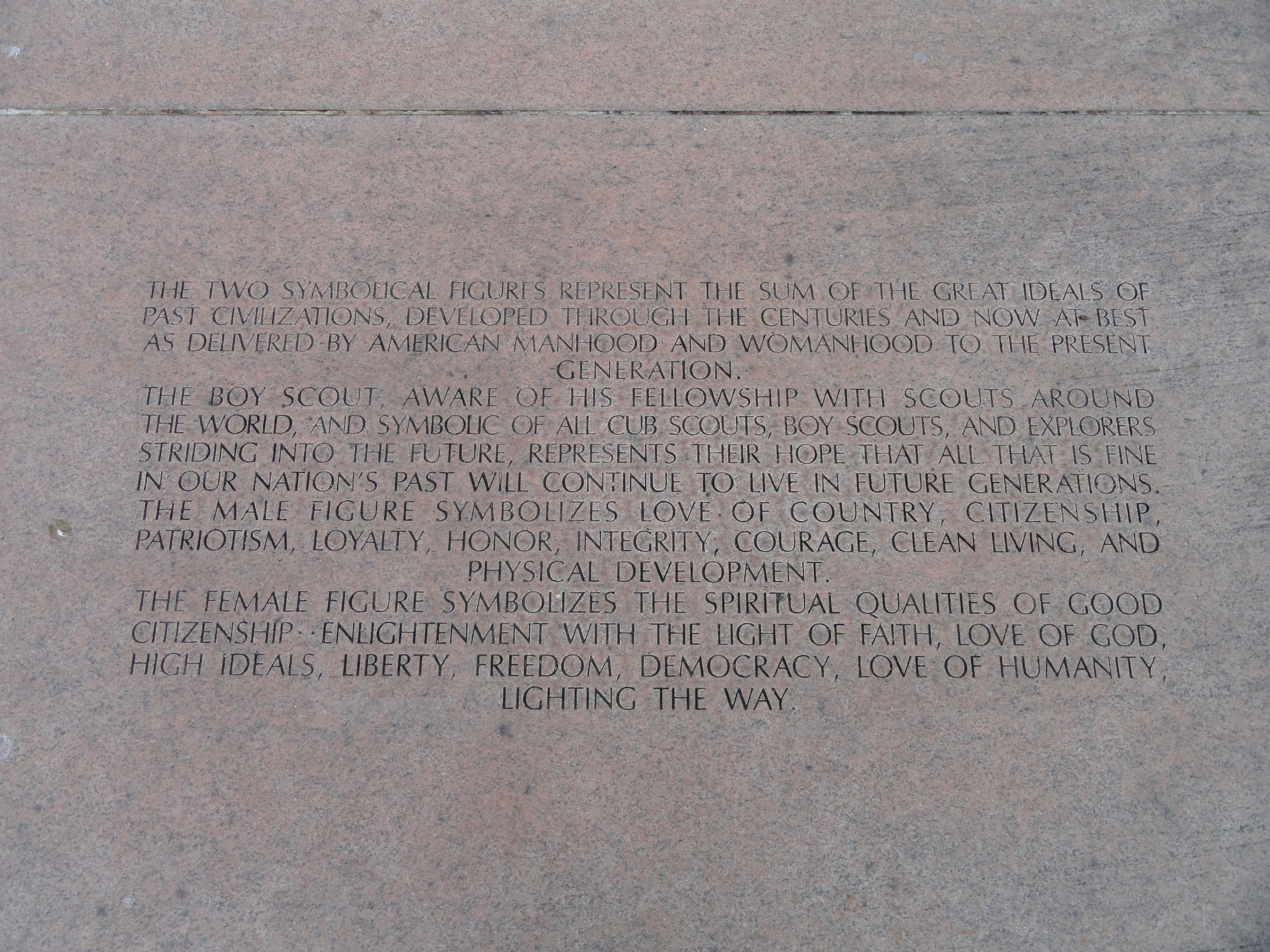
Inscription at the foot of the monument explaining the meaning to visitors

The rim of the pool is inscribed:

This memorial was authorized by the Congress of the United States and directed in recognition of the fiftieth anniversary of the Boy Scouts of America in grateful tribute to the men and women whose generosity devotion and leadership have brought Scouting to the nation's youth and to honor all members of the Boy Scouts of America who in days of peace and times of peril have done their duty to God and their country.

== Information ==
The three figures represent various concepts. According to the National Park Service the Boy Scout "represents the aspirations of all past, present, and future Scouts throughout the world. The male figure exemplifies physical, mental, and moral fitness, love of country, good citizenship, loyalty, honor, and courage. He carries a helmet, a symbol of masculine attire. The female figure symbolizes enlightenment with the love of God and fellow man, justice, freedom, and democracy. She holds the eternal flame of God's Holy Spirit."

The sculpture was founded by Modern Art Foundry in New York.

=== Acquisition ===
In 1959, the 50th anniversary year of Scouting, Lyndon B. Johnson, then Senate majority leader, introduced a measure to establish the memorial. Upon approval, funds for the sculpture were raised by Boy Scouts collecting dimes throughout the country, therefore no government spending was used. The names of all the collecting Scouts are inscribed on scrolls that are placed inside the base of the unit.

The sculpture sits at the location of the 1937 National Scout Jamboree, the first jamboree. It was dedicated on November 7, 1964, and accepted by Associate Supreme Court Justice Tom C. Clark who celebrated his 50th anniversary of being an Eagle Scout on that day.

== Condition ==
This sculpture was surveyed by Save Outdoor Sculpture! in 1993 and was described as "well maintained".

== See also ==
- List of public art in Washington, D.C., Ward 2
- Scouting in Washington, D.C.
