= Donald De Lue =

American sculptor (1897-1988)

- Born: October 5, 1897; Boston, Massachusetts
- Died: August 26, 1988 (aged 90); Leonardo, New Jersey
- Education: Boston Museum of Fine Arts
- Known for: public monuments
- Style: sculpture

Donald Harcourt De Lue (October 5, 1897 – August 26, 1988) was an American sculptor, best known for his public monuments.

== Life and career ==
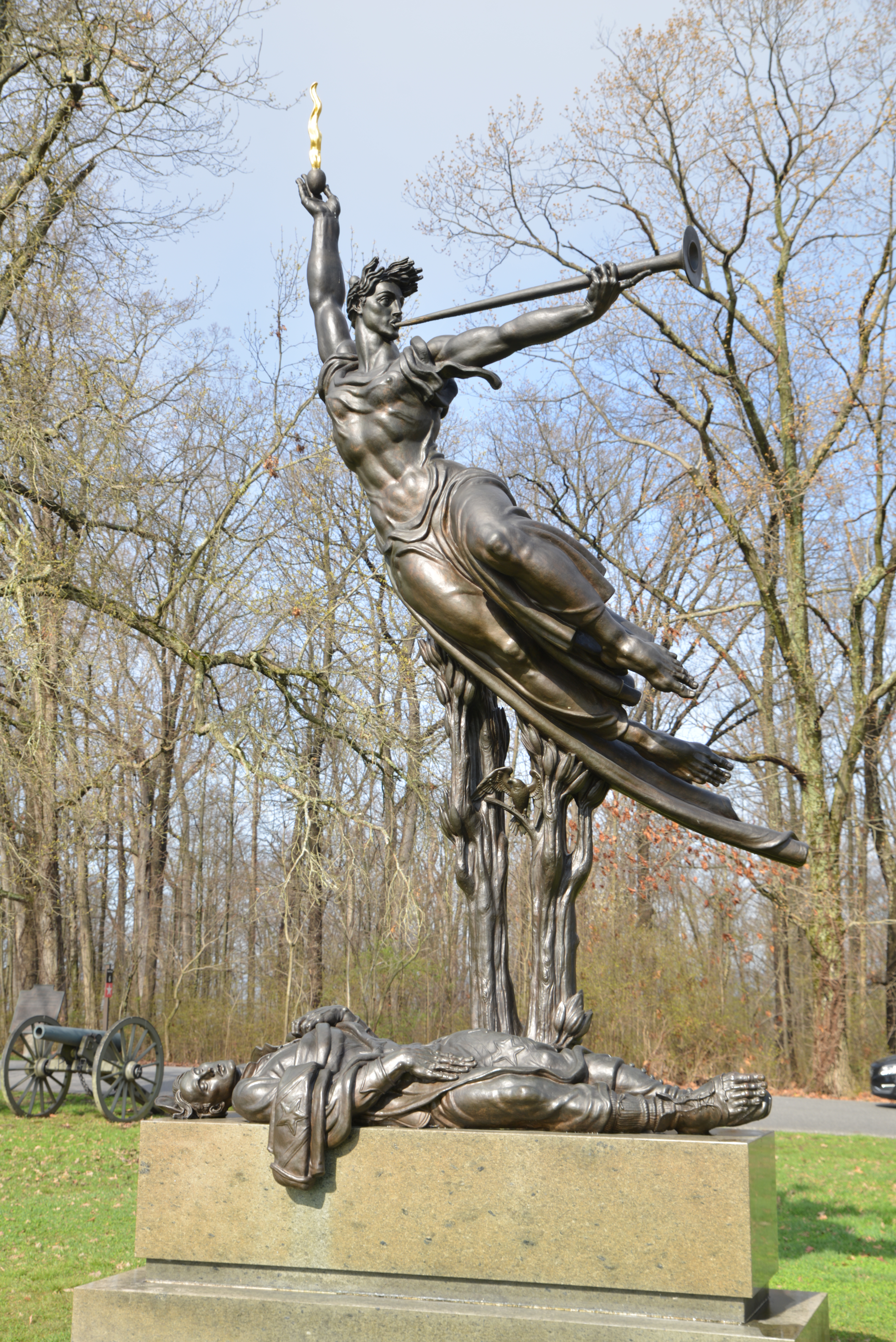
Louisiana State Monument (1971), Gettysburg Battlefield.

De Lue was born in Boston, Massachusetts. He studied at the Boston Museum of Fine Arts and later served as an assistant to sculptors Richard Henry Recchia and Robert P. Baker. This was followed by five years in Paris where he continued his study, while working as an assistant to various French artists. He returned to the United States where he was engaged by Bryant Baker. In 1940 he was elected into the National Academy of Design as an Associate member, and became a full Academician in 1943.

In 1941, De Lue won a competition to create sculpture for the U.S. Post Office and Courthouse Building in Philadelphia, and from then on he stopped being an assistant for other artists and only worked on his own commissions and creations.

De Lue's works can be found in many museums across America. Like many other sculptors of his generation, he executed architectural works. He was also a prolific designer of medals and medallions.

De Lue taught at the Beaux-Arts Institute of Design in New York City during the early 1940s. In 1960, he won two Henry Hering Awards, given by the National Sculpture Society for outstanding collaboration between a sculptor and an architect, for the Normandy American Cemetery and Memorial in Colleville-sur-Mer, France, and for the Stations of the Cross at the Loyola Jesuit Seminary in Shrub Oak, New York.

In 1967, De Lue won the American Numismatic Society's J. Sanford Saltus Award for Outstanding Achievement in the Art of the Medal, known as the Saltus Award.

Beginning in 1964, for many years De Lue was a Trustee of Brookgreen Gardens, as well as Chairman of the Art Committee.

In his later years, De Lue and his wife Naomi (who served as a model for many of his statues) lived in the Leonardo section of Middletown Township, New Jersey, a small shore town with a bayside beach and long-distance view of lower Manhattan. De Lue cited the 23rd Psalm and the words "He leadeth me beside the still waters..." as the inspiration by which he arrived in Leonardo from New York City. Although he continued to maintain his NYC apartment, it was in his Leonardo studio that many of his largest statues were made. One of the last was a commission by a private individual intended for the Alamo in San Antonio, Texas. The bigger-than-life statue of James Bowie, William B. Travis, and Davy Crockett was considered "too violent" by the Daughters of the Republic of Texas for placement in a sacred chapel. A compromise was sought, that the statue be installed outside the building in the large courtyard rather than inside. DeLue and his patron, a wealthy Texan, preferred the statue be installed in the interior space for which it was made. Unfortunately, the impasse was never resolved in De Lue's lifetime.

Donald and Naomi De Lue are buried in Manalapan Township, New Jersey at the cemetery at Old Tennent Presbyterian Church.

== Selected works ==
=== Pennsylvania sites ===
- The Alchemist, Chemistry Building, University of Pennsylvania, Philadelphia, 1940.
- Law and Justice, Robert N. C. Nix Sr. Federal Building, Philadelphia, 1941.
- Eagles, Old Federal Reserve Bank Building, Philadelphia, 1941.
- Triton Fountain, Old Federal Reserve Bank Building, Philadelphia, 1941.
- Louisiana State Monument, Gettysburg Battlefield, Gettysburg, 1971.
- Mississippi State Monument, Gettysburg Battlefield, Gettysburg, 1973.
- "Soldiers and Sailors of the Confederacy" Gettysburg Battlefield, Gettysburg, PA. Commemorated August 25, 1965.
- George Washington Kneeling in Prayer, Freedoms Foundation, Valley Forge, 1966–67.

=== Other U.S. sites ===
- Harvey S. Firestone Memorial, Akron, Ohio, 1950.
- Chancel sculpture at the War Memorial Chapel at Virginia Tech, Blacksburg, VA, dedicated May 29, 1960.
- George Washington as Master Mason, Main Branch, New Orleans Public Library, New Orleans, Louisiana, 1959–60.
  - Replicas at Flushing, New York 1964, Wallingford, Connecticut 1965, Detroit, Michigan 1966, Alexandria, Virginia 1966, Lansing, Michigan 1982, and Indianapolis, Indiana 1987.
- Boy Scout Memorial, President's Park, Washington, DC, 1963.
- Rocket Thrower, Flushing Meadows-Corona Park, Queens, New York City, 1964. Created for the 1964 New York World's Fair.
- Quest Eternal, Prudential Tower, Boston, Massachusetts, 1967.
- Special Warfare Memorial Statue ("Bronze Bruce"), Fort Bragg, North Carolina, 1968. The first Vietnam War memorial.
- The Mountaineer, West Virginia University, Morgantown, West Virginia, 1971.
- Thomas Jefferson, Wichita State University, Wichita, Kansas, 1975.

=== International sites ===
- Normandy American Cemetery and Memorial, Colleville-sur-Mer, France, 1953–1956, Harbeson, Hough, Livingston and Larson, architects.
  - The Spirit of American Youth Rising from the Waves. Surrounding the 22-foot (6.7.m) statue's base is the inscription: "MINE EYES HAVE SEEN THE GLORY OF THE COMING OF THE LORD."
  - Allegorical figures of France and America.
  - Ceremonial urns.

== Gallery ==
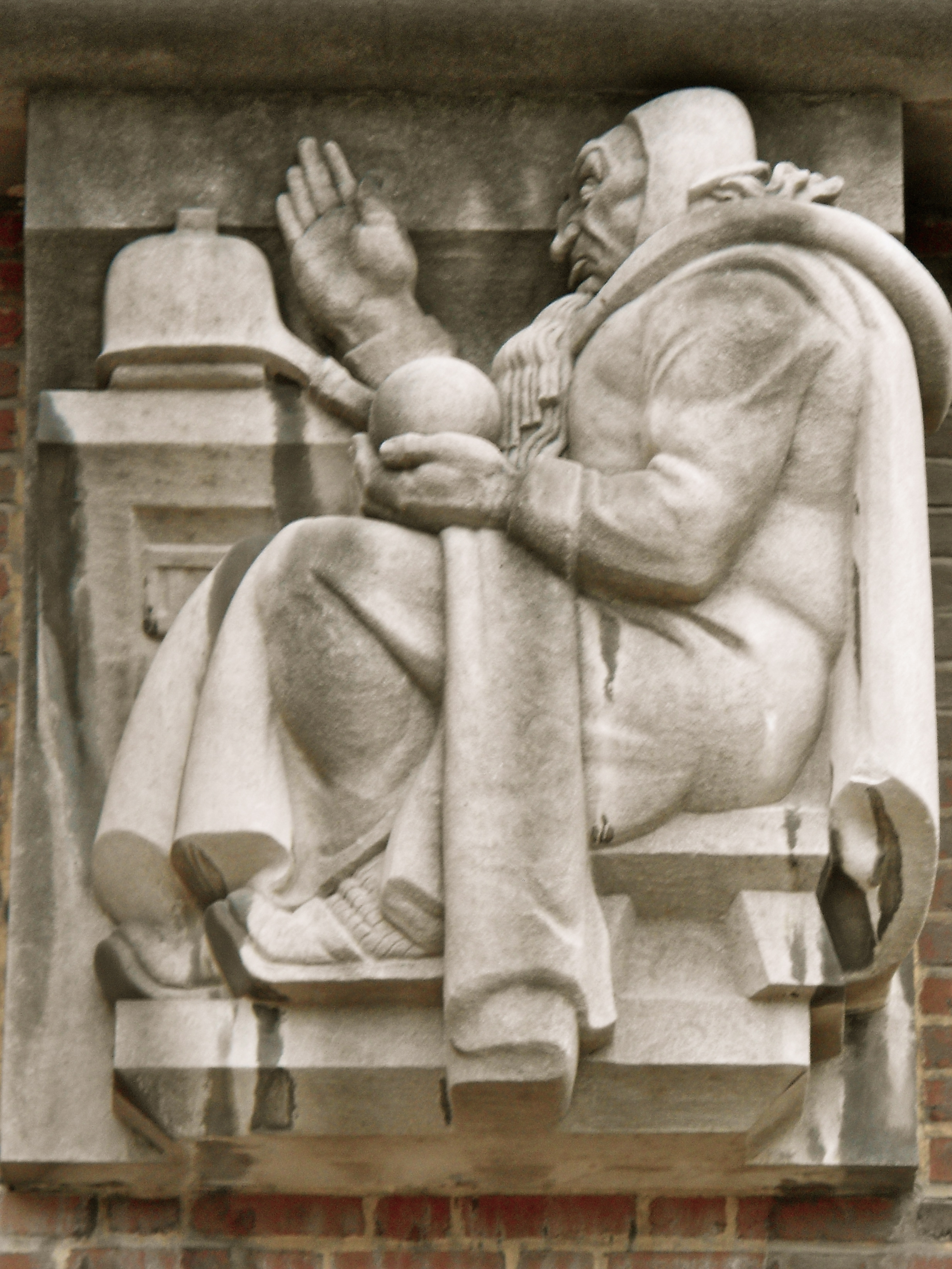
The Alchemist (1940), University of Pennsylvania, Philadelphia.

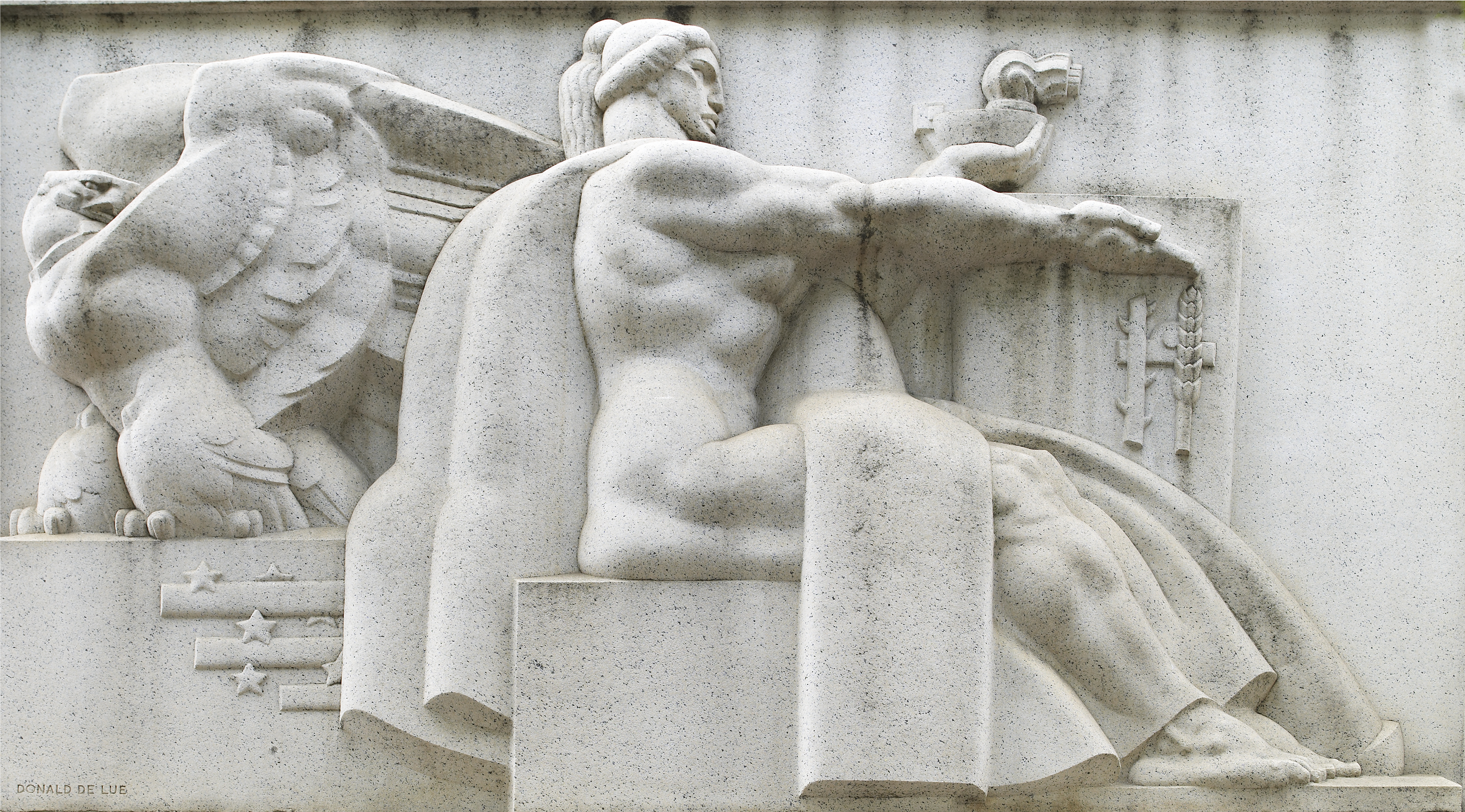
Justice (1941), Robert N. C. Nix Sr. Federal Building, Philadelphia.

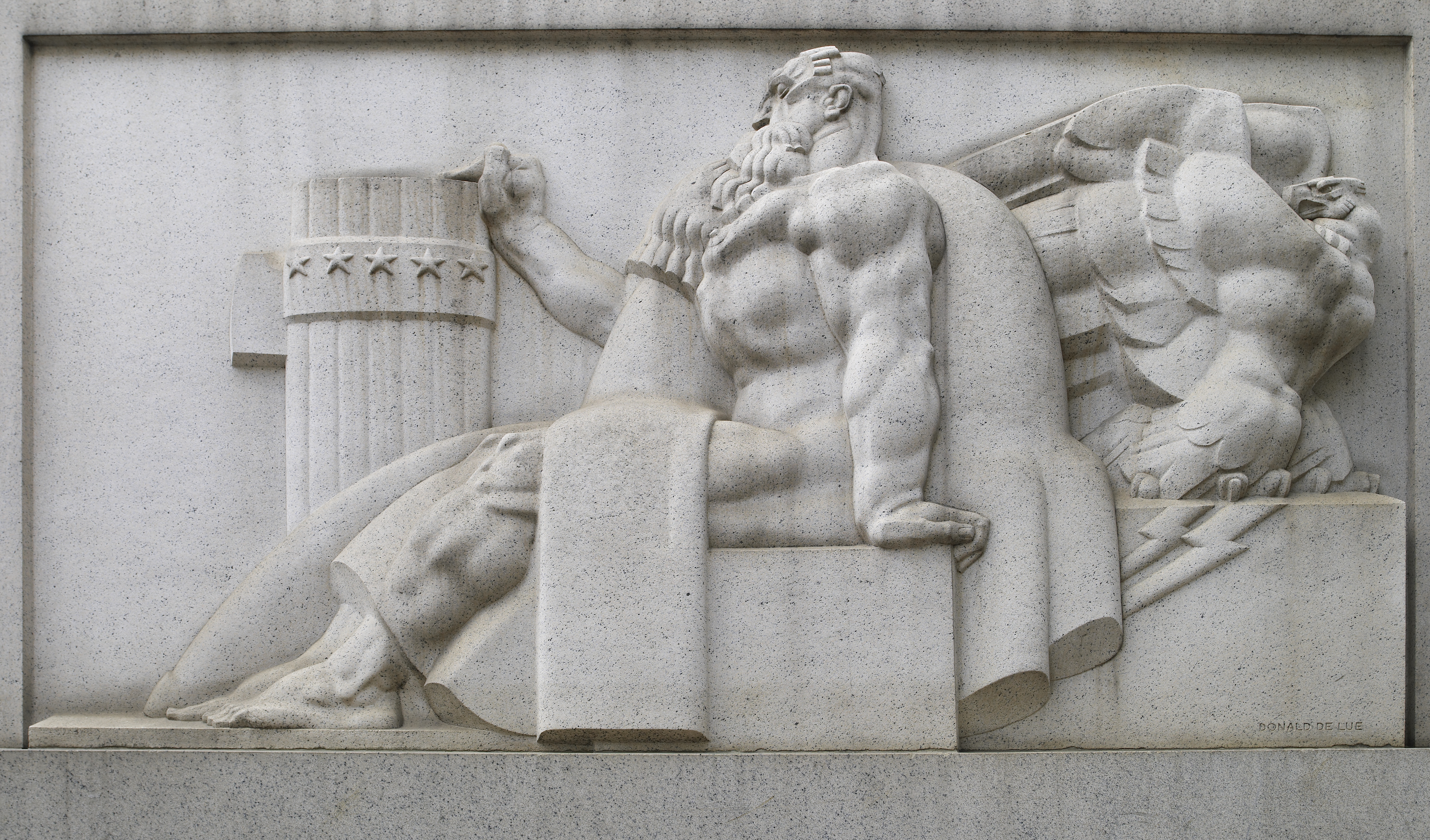
Law (1941), Robert N. C. Nix Sr. Federal Building, Philadelphia.

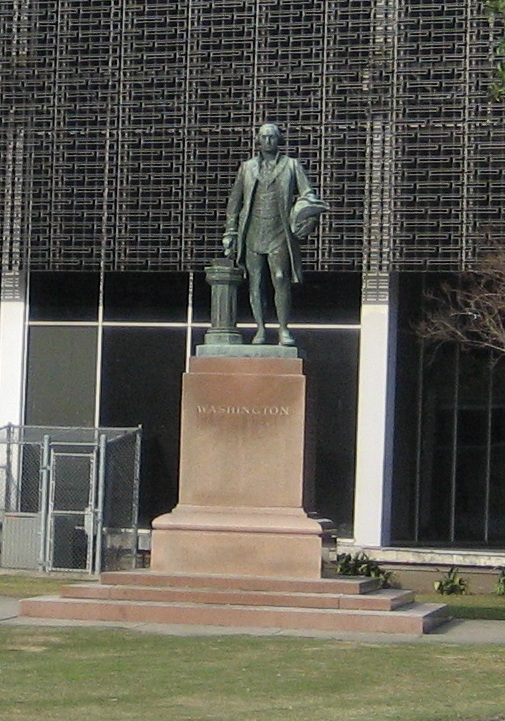
George Washington as Master Mason (1959–60), New Orleans Public Library.

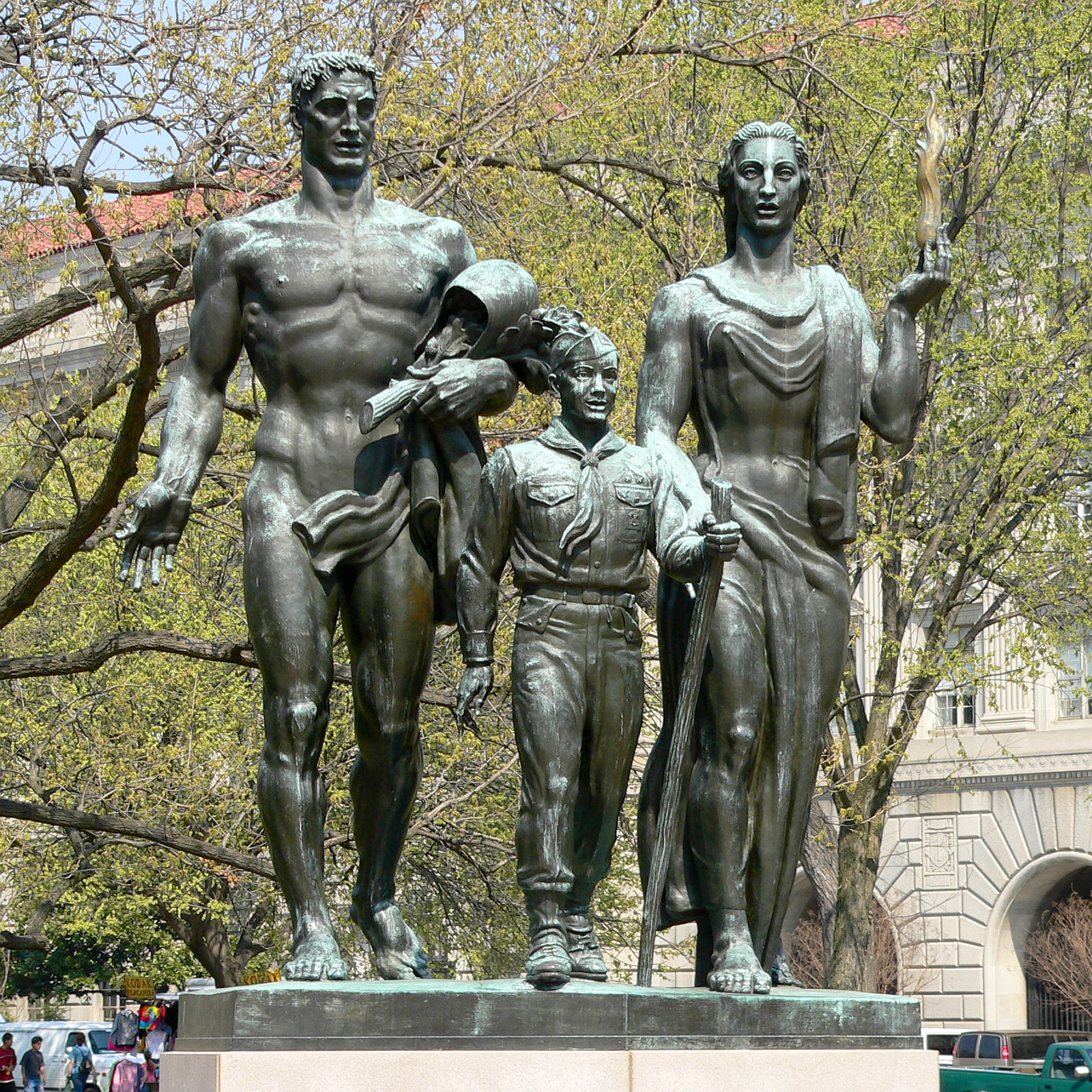
Boy Scout Memorial (1963), President's Park, Washington D.C.

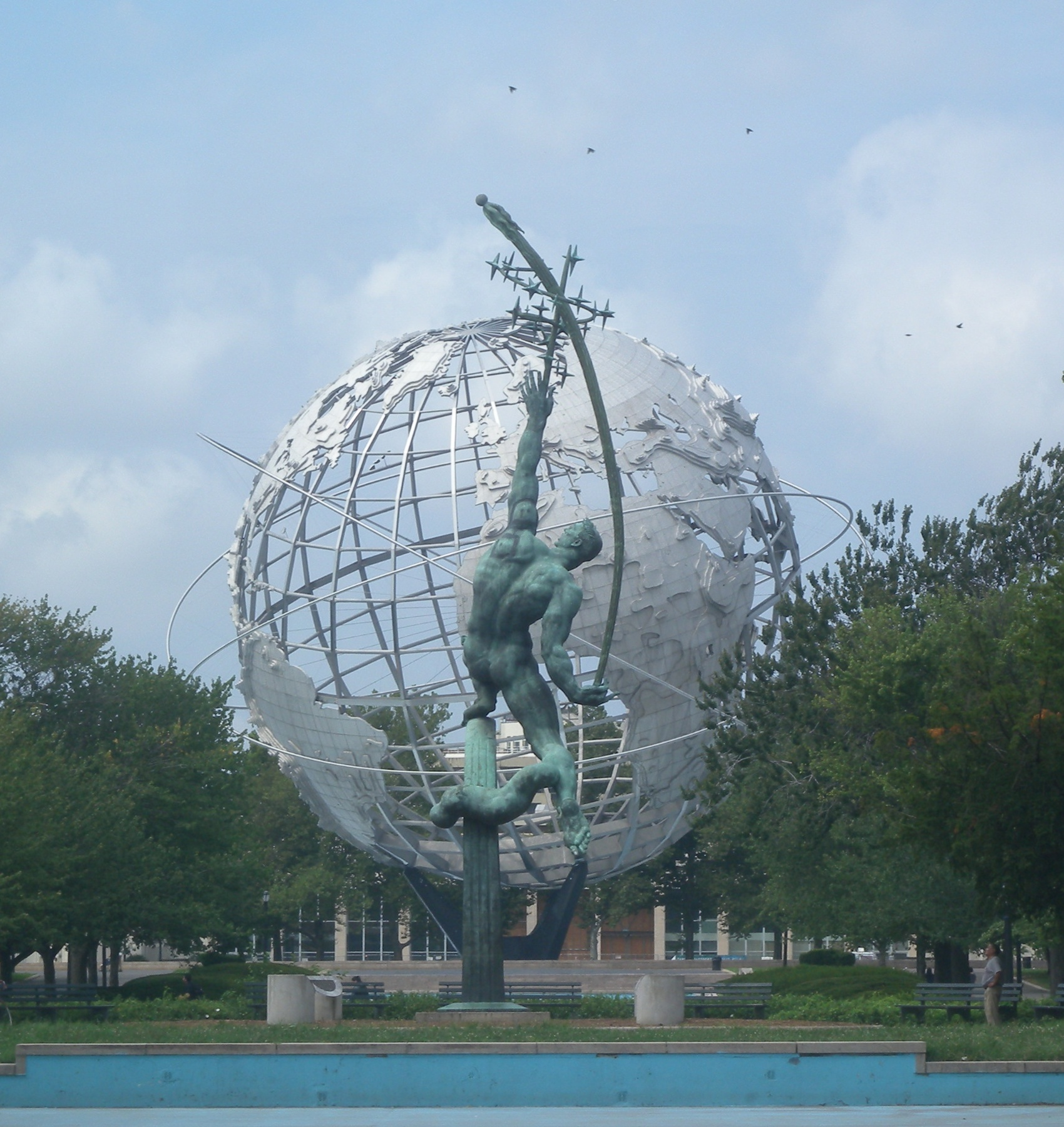
Rocket Thrower (1964), Flushing Meadows–Corona Park, Queens, New York City.

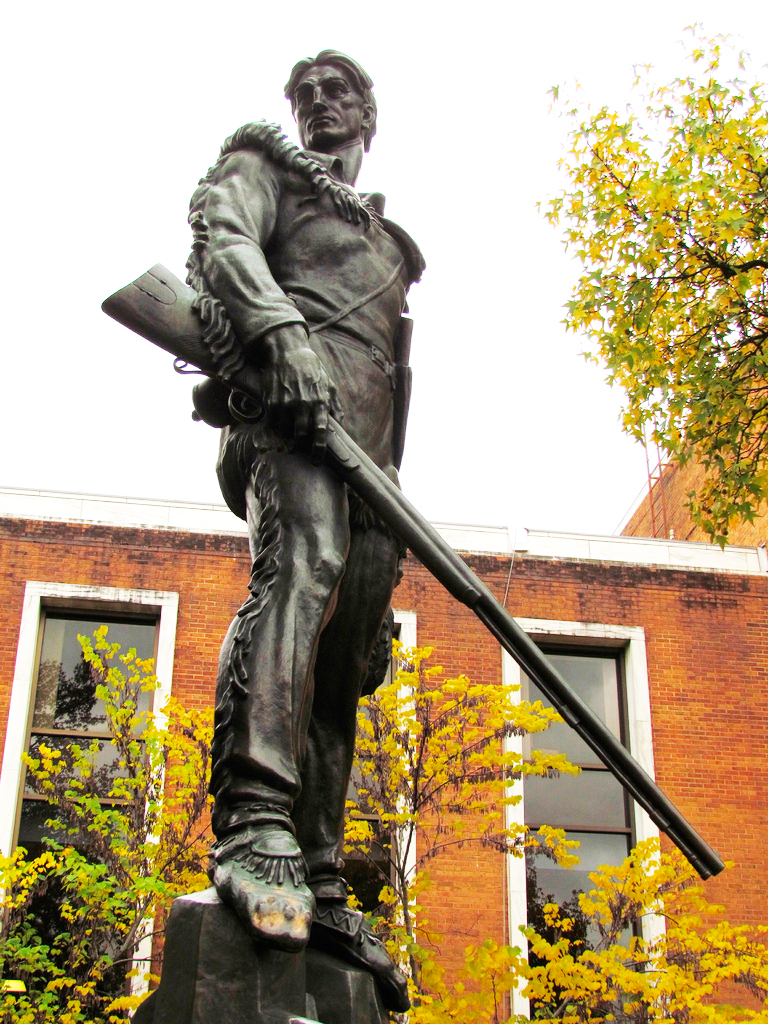
The Mountaineer (1971), West Virginia University, Morgantown, West Virginia

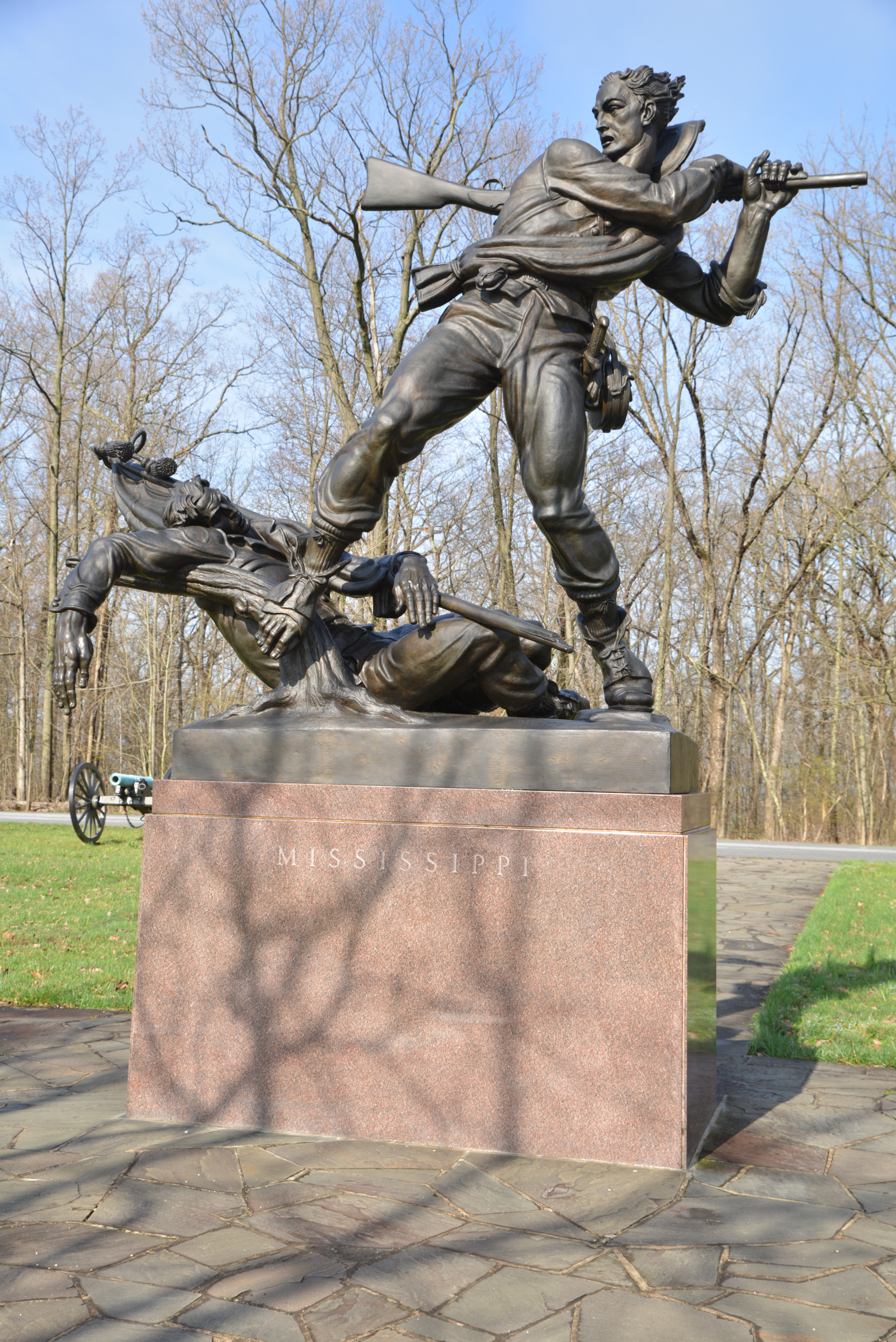
Mississippi State Monument (1973), Gettysburg Battlefield.

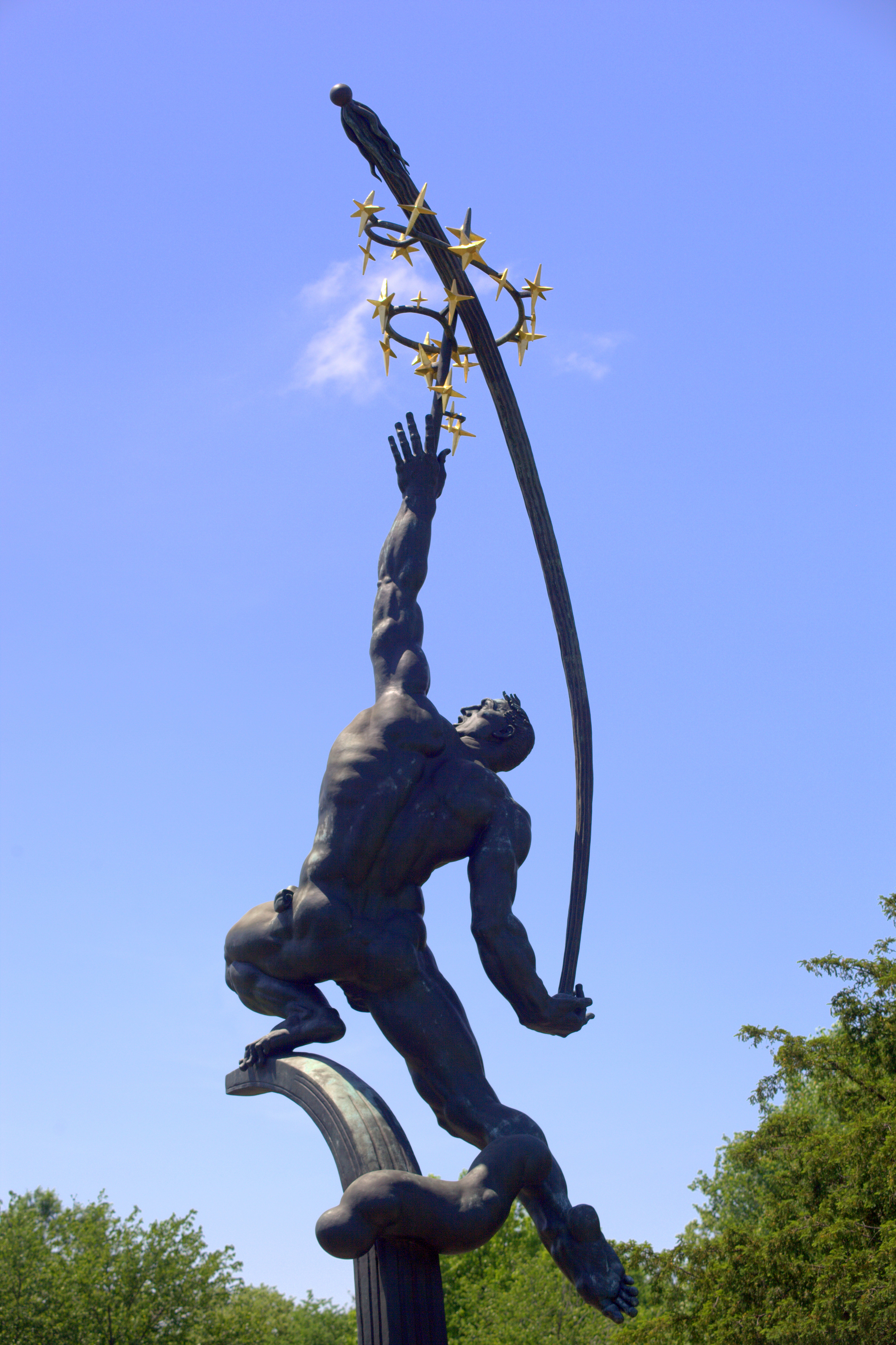
Unisphere reflecting pool,(1963) The Rocketman, as the park workers call him. Bronze, Flushing Meadows–Corona Park
