= College Point =

Neighborhood in New York City

- Neighborhood of Queens
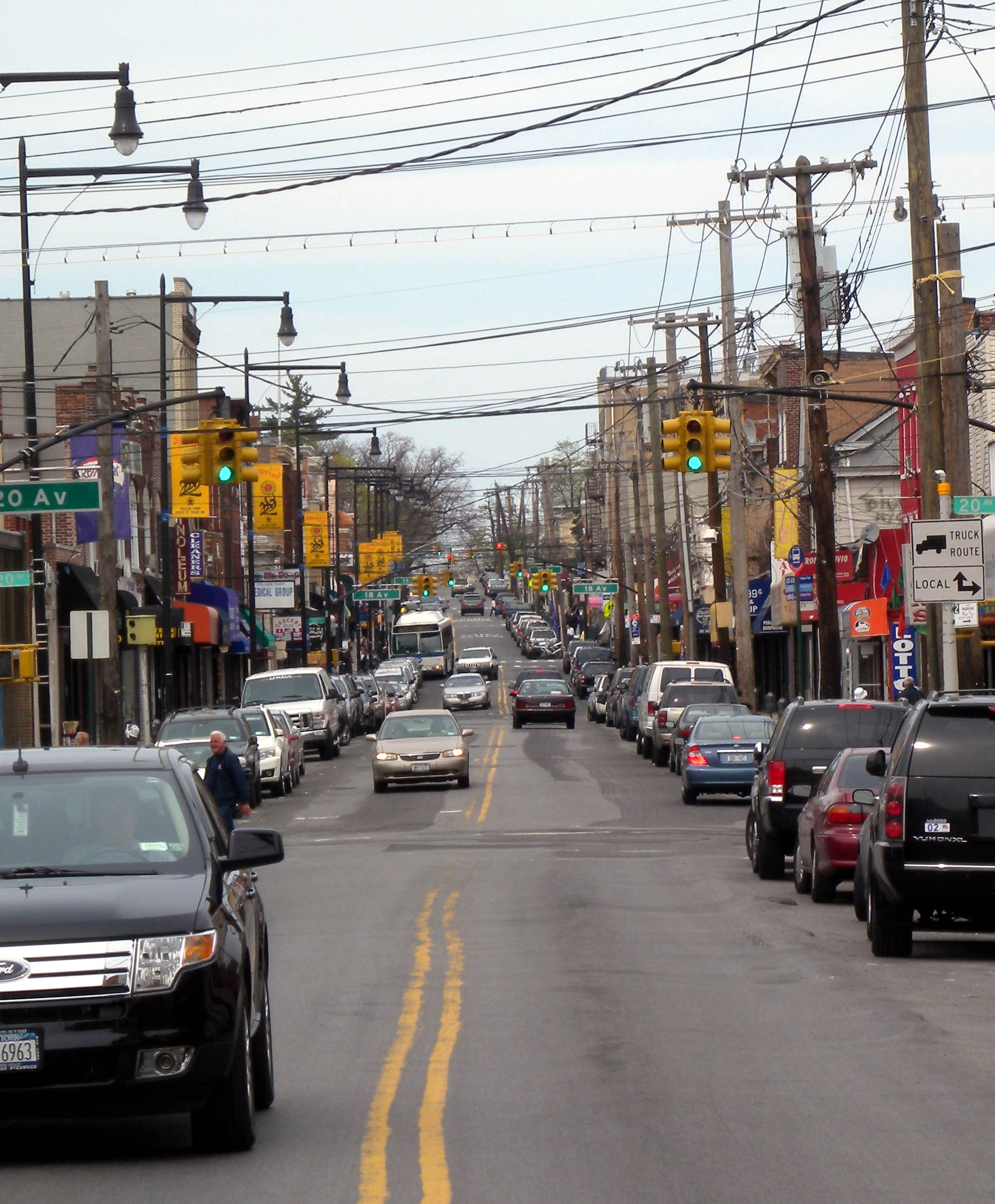
- College Point Boulevard
- Interactive map of College Point
- Coordinates: 40.785°N 73.835°W
- Country: United States
- State: New York
- City: New York City
- County/Borough: Queens
- Community District: Queens 7
- Named for: St. Paul's College

Population (2017 ACS Census)
  - Total: 24,069

Race/Ethnicity
  - Hispanic: 40.1%
  - Asian: 34.3%
  - White: 21.3%
  - Other/Multiracial: 2.3%
  - Black: 2.0%

Economics
  - Median income: $59,712
- Time zone: UTC−5 (Eastern)
  - Summer (DST): UTC−4 (EDT)
- ZIP Code: 11356
- Area codes: 718, 347, 929, and 917

College Point is a working-middle-class neighborhood in the New York City borough of Queens. It is bounded to the south by Whitestone Expressway and Flushing; to the east by 138th Street and Malba/Whitestone; to the north by the East River; and to the west by Flushing Bay. College Point is a mostly residential ethnically diverse community with some industrial areas. The neighborhood is served by several parks and contains two yacht clubs.

College Point is located in Queens Community District 7 and its ZIP Code is 11356. It is patrolled by the New York City Police Department's 109th Precinct. Politically, College Point is represented by the New York City Council's 19th District.

== History ==
=== 19th century ===
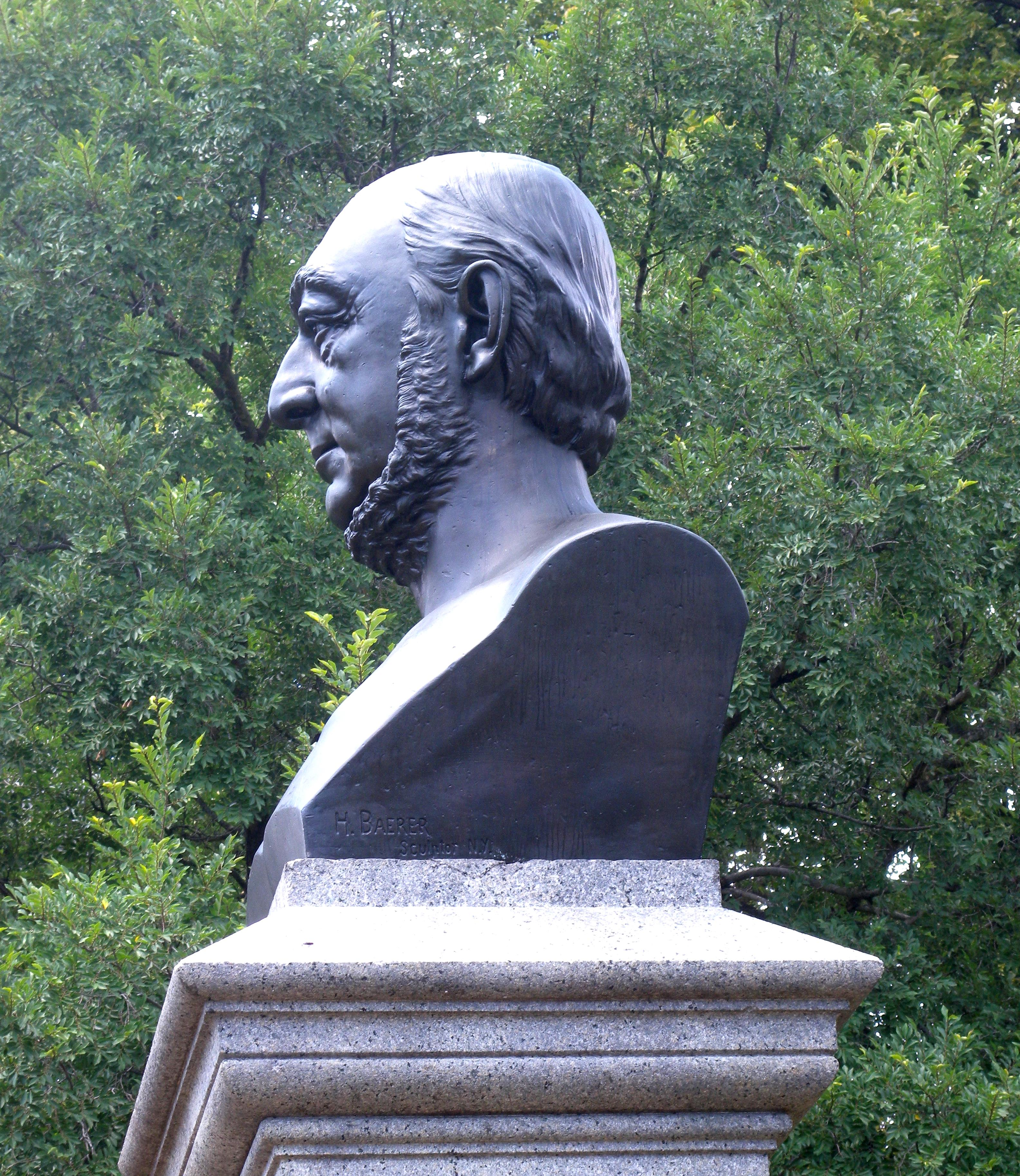
Bust of Conrad Poppenhusen

College Point was named for St. Paul's College, an Episcopalian seminary founded in 1835 by the Rev. William Augustus Muhlenberg. The college closed around 1850, but the name remained. Former names include Lawrence's Neck, Tew's Neck, Flammersberg, and Strattonsport.

The original European settler of this area was Captain William Lawrence. He was also the largest landholder of the original incorporators of the Town of Flushing, now in Queens. He arrived in America on the sailing ship Planter in the 1630s. Lawrence married the oldest daughter of Richard "Bull Rider" Smith, who founded Smithtown on Long Island. He and his wife had a son, William Jr., who married the Richard Smiths' youngest granddaughter.

In 1854 the German-American industrialist Conrad Poppenhusen arrived; he was already a prosperous manufacturer in Brooklyn of hard rubber goods and expanded his operation to this small farming community. College Point became a factory town primarily for his workers, most of them also German immigrants, and the tycoon became a philanthropist, contributing to churches, libraries, and the Poppenhusen Institute, an educational beacon of College Point. Poppenhusen is responsible for the first free kindergarten in America. He connected College Point to Flushing by the Whitestone Branch of the Flushing and North Side Railroad. A monument on College Point Boulevard, one of the main streets in College Point, stands testament to Poppenhusen.

=== Early 20th century ===
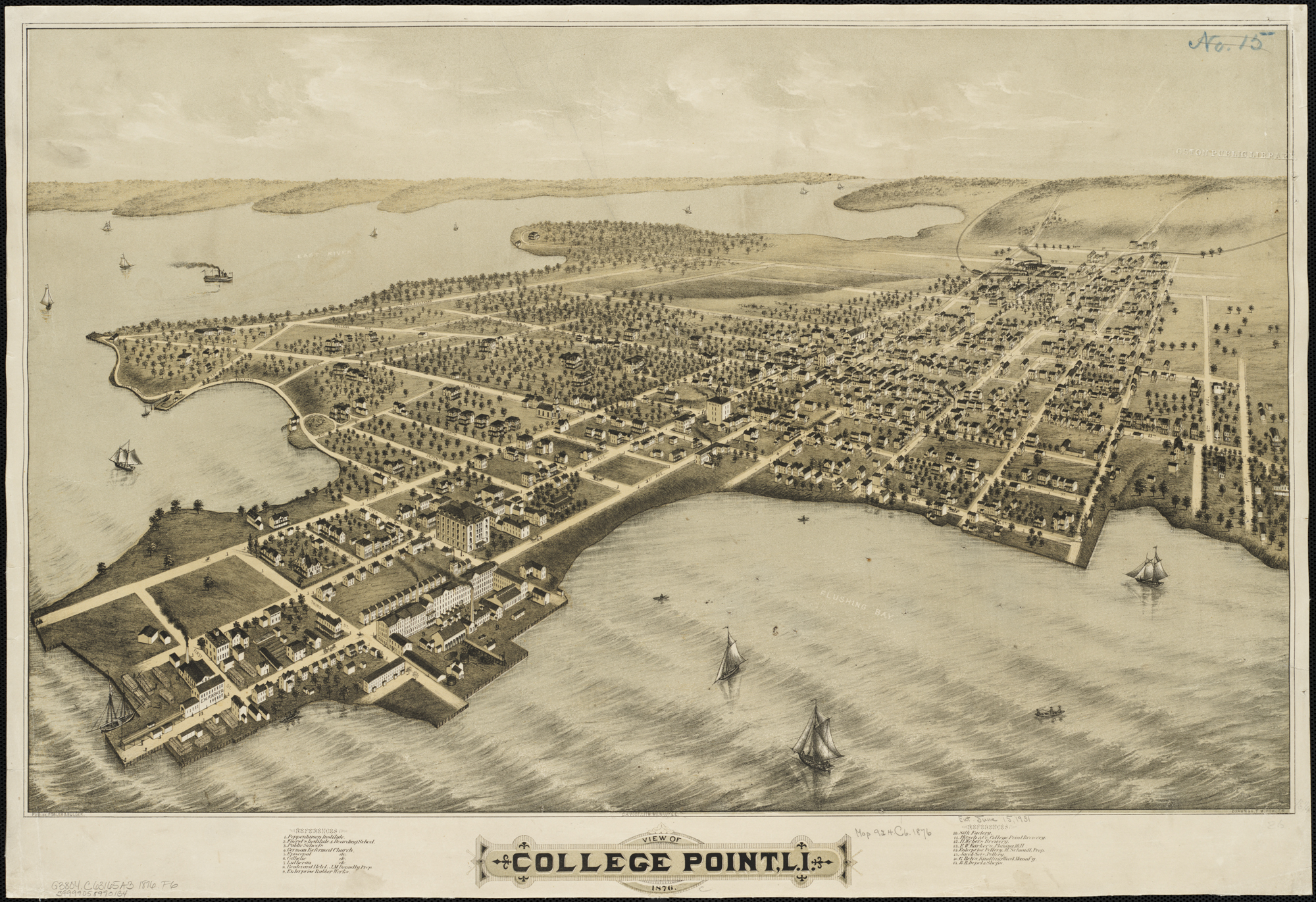
Sketch of College Point

College Point became a center for breweries and day trip resorts, and in the 1930s shifted towards the manufacturing of airplane parts. Until the mid-20th century, the partially infilled Mill Creek separated College Point from the rest of Queens. College Point was a peninsula connected to the rest of Queens by four roads: College Point Boulevard, Linden Place, 20th Avenue, and 14th Avenue; all except the last crossed Mill Creek.

Flushing Airport opened in the neighborhood in 1927. Throughout its tenure, the airport was troubled by its proximity to the larger LaGuardia Airport, neighborhood opposition due to noise and accidents, and flooding on the runways. Its main clientele were private airplanes and blimps. Whenever northwest or southwest winds rose above 35 miles per hour, the runways would not operate. Lacking proper lighting, the runway also never allowed for nighttime usage.

In 1926, approximately 100 single-family and two-family houses were built on the Graham estate. In 1938, the 6-acre (2.4 ha) estate of Anna Schlesinger, near Ninth Avenue and 119th Street, was sold to the Daniel Corners Realty Corporation. The land had previously been part of the Poppenhusen estate. The Daniel Corners Realty Corporation bought the land to build fifty homes on the land, which it called College Estates. Arthur Allen was the architect of the houses.

In 1925, Earl Dodge Osborn gave his initials to the Edo Aircraft Corporation. The company was known for building and testing seaplanes and aircraft floats.

In 1953, the Fleet Street Company sold 108 Cape Cod-style homes for $13,500 near 25th Avenue and 126th Street. The architect of the homes was Alwin Cassens Jr. The development was called Allied Homes.

=== Late 20th century ===
College Point Industrial Park, a commercial area and business park, was first proposed for College Point in 1960. The site, initially 300 acres (120 ha), was bounded by Whitestone Expressway on the southeast, 15th Avenue on the north, and 127th Street on the west. The site was chosen because it was the largest suitable tract that was not on Staten Island, which was considered to be too remote from the rest of New York City. The proposal languished for several years before being revived in 1967. By the 1970s, the Adventure's Inn Amusement Park was being operated on part of the 565-acre (229 ha) complex. The city condemned the amusement park site in 1973 due to nuisance complaints. The next year, the industrial park was founded on a site of 550 acres (220 ha). The complex was later rebranded the College Point Corporate Park (CPCP) because there had been few industrial tenants there.

Flushing Airport was decommissioned in 1984. Much of Linden Place in College Point was also closed due to frequent flooding near the airport, which had been built on a wetland atop Mill Creek. There were several proposals to redevelop the airport site, none of which were successful. One plan in 1986 called for the site to be redeveloped as a large heliport, though the project ultimately failed seven years later. Several large development projects were constructed around the airport site in the late 1980s. These buildings included three projects inside the CPCP campus, as well as another building at Linden Place and 31st Road. Floor space in these buildings rented out at an average of $10 per square foot ($110/m^{2}), a relatively expensive rate at the time. This was due to its proximity to major transportation connections such as the LaGuardia Airport and the Bronx–Whitestone Bridge, as well as the lack of parking in nearby downtown Flushing.

By 1994, the CPCP had over 100 companies. The CPCP proposed to develop a strip mall with large "mega-stores" on 20th Avenue, though this idea was initially opposed by local residents. The strip mall was developed by The Related Companies and opened in 1998; it contains a Waldbaum's, Target, BJ's Wholesale Club, and other stores. When the strip mall opened, there were plans to reopen Linden Place. In 1999, Triangle Equities developed a Multiplex cinema with two stores in College Point, on a site bounded by Ulmer Street, 28th Avenue, Linden Place, and Whitestone Expressway. Other large projects included a new factory for Crystal Windows and Door Systems next to the Whitestone Expressway. The printing plant for The New York Times, which opened on the Whitestone Expressway in 1997, enabled the newspaper to expand its nationwide distribution. Also in 1997, the Queens Historical Society bestowed a "Queensmark" award on College Point, in hopes of encouraging historical preservation of local landmark architecture.

=== 21st century ===
There was an increase in residential development in the 1990s and 2000s; a New York Times article in March 2002 stated that 450 residential units had been developed in the previous 14 months. The following year, the Times reported that the corporate park had more than 200 companies. There were proposals to redevelop the Flushing Airport site as a wholesalers' complex in the early 2000s, but these were protested by College Point residents. The northern shoreline of College Point, a former oil lagoon, was designated a federal Superfund cleanup site in 2010.

Groundbreaking for a new New York City Police Academy at College Point occurred in December 2009, and Phase One opened in December 2015. After several delays, Linden Place was finally renovated in the 2010s so that it would be several feet above the Flushing Airport Wetlands. The first portion of Linden Place reopened in 2015, and the remaining section was set to reopen in 2022.

== Land use ==
Though College Point is today mainly residential, it also contains significant commercial presence, as well as remnants of a once-active industrial community. Especially in the southern part of the neighborhood, there are many industrial and light commercial businesses, including what The New York Times described as "oil storage facilities, a cement plant, a Pepsi-Cola distribution facility, furniture warehouses and contractors and other small businesses". The northern shoreline was redeveloped as a medium-density residential area starting in the 1980s. However, College Point's other residences consist largely of single-family homes from the 1920s.

== Demographics ==
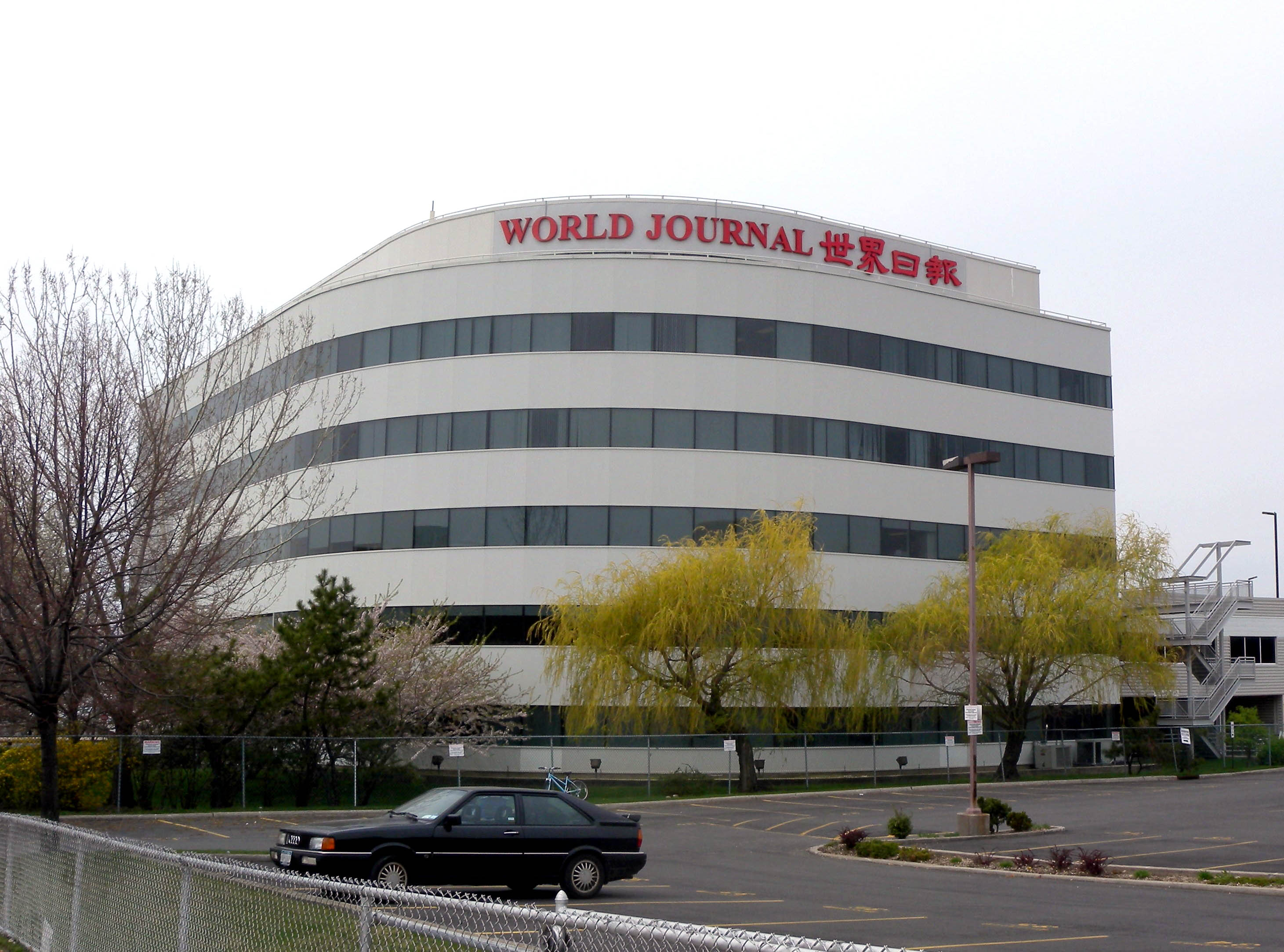
Headquarters of the Chinese language publication World Journal in College Point, along Interstate 678

Based on data from the 2020 United States Census, the population of College Point was 33,625, an increase of 5,379 (19.0%) from the 28,246 counted in 2010. In 2010, the neighborhood covered an area of 1,148.84 acres (464.92 ha) and had a population density of 21.1 inhabitants per acre (13,500/sq mi; 5,200/km^{2}).

The racial makeup of the neighborhood was 40.1% (13,471) Hispanic/Latino (of any race), 34.3% (11,525) Asian non-Hispanic, 21.3% (7,176) White non-Hispanic, 2.0% (687) Black non-Hispanic, 0.7% (244) from some other race non-Hispanic, and 1.6% (522) non-Hispanic of two or more races.

The entirety of Community Board 7, which comprises Flushing, College Point, and Whitestone, had 263,039 inhabitants as of NYC Health's 2018 Community Health Profile, with an average life expectancy of 84.3 years. This is longer than the median life expectancy of 81.2 for all New York City neighborhoods. Most inhabitants are middle-aged and elderly: 22% are between the ages of between 25 and 44, 30% between 45 and 64, and 18% over 65. The ratio of youth and college-aged residents was lower, at 17% and 7% respectively.

As of 2017, the median household income in Community Board 7 was $51,284. In 2018, an estimated 25% of College Point and Flushing residents lived in poverty, compared to 19% in all of Queens and 20% in all of New York City. One in seventeen residents (6%) were unemployed, compared to 8% in Queens and 9% in New York City. Rent burden, or the percentage of residents who have difficulty paying their rent, is 57% in College Point and Flushing, lower than the boroughwide and citywide rates of 53% and 51% respectively. Based on this calculation, as of 2018, College Point and Flushing are considered to be high-income relative to the rest of the city and not gentrifying.

== Police and crime ==
Flushing, College Point, and Whitestone are patrolled by the 109th Precinct of the NYPD, located at 37-05 Union Street. The 109th Precinct ranked 9th safest out of 69 patrol areas for per-capita crime in 2010. As of 2018, with a non-fatal assault rate of 17 per 100,000 people, College Point and Flushing's rate of violent crimes per capita is less than that of the city as a whole. The incarceration rate of 145 per 100,000 people is lower than that of the city as a whole.

The 109th Precinct has a lower crime rate than in the 1990s, with crimes across all categories having decreased by 83.7% between 1990 and 2018. The precinct reported 6 murders, 30 rapes, 202 robberies, 219 felony assaults, 324 burglaries, 970 grand larcenies, and 126 grand larcenies auto in 2018.

A large New York City Police Academy campus was built near 28th Avenue and College Point Boulevard, opening in December 2015.

== Fire safety ==
College Point contains a New York City Fire Department (FDNY) fire station, Engine Co. 297/Ladder Co. 130, at 119-11 14th Road.

== Health ==
As of 2018, preterm births and births to teenage mothers are less common in College Point and Flushing than in other places citywide. In College Point and Flushing, there were 63 preterm births per 1,000 live births (compared to 87 per 1,000 citywide), and 8 births to teenage mothers per 1,000 live births (compared to 19.3 per 1,000 citywide). College Point and Flushing have a higher than average population of residents who are uninsured. In 2018, this population of uninsured residents was estimated to be 14%, slightly higher than the citywide rate of 12%.

The concentration of fine particulate matter, the deadliest type of air pollutant, in College Point and Flushing is 0.0073 milligrams per cubic metre (7.3×10^{−9} oz/ft^{3}), less than the city average. Thirteen percent of College Point and Flushing residents are smokers, which is lower than the city average of 14% of residents being smokers. In College Point and Flushing, 13% of residents are obese, 8% are diabetic, and 22% have high blood pressure—compared to the citywide averages of 22%, 8%, and 23% respectively. In addition, 15% of children are obese, compared to the citywide average of 20%.

Ninety-five percent of residents eat some fruits and vegetables every day, which is higher than the city's average of 87%. In 2018, 71% of residents described their health as "good", "very good", or "excellent", lower than the city's average of 78%. For every supermarket in College Point and Flushing, there are 6 bodegas.

The nearest major hospitals are NewYork–Presbyterian/Queens and Flushing Hospital Medical Center.

== Post offices and ZIP Code ==
College Point is covered by the ZIP Code 11356. The United States Post Office operates two post offices nearby:

- College Point Station – 120-07 15th Avenue
- Linden Hill Station – 29-50 Union Street

== Education ==
College Point and Flushing generally have a similar rate of college-educated residents to the rest of the city as of 2018. While 37% of residents age 25 and older have a college education or higher, 23% have less than a high school education and 40% are high school graduates or have some college education. By contrast, 39% of Queens residents and 43% of city residents have a college education or higher. The percentage of College Point and Flushing students excelling in math rose from 55% in 2000 to 78% in 2011, and reading achievement rose from 57% to 59% during the same time period.

College Point and Flushing's rate of elementary school student absenteeism is less than the rest of New York City. In College Point and Flushing, 9% of elementary school students missed twenty or more days per school year, lower than the citywide average of 20%. Additionally, 86% of high school students in College Point and Flushing graduate on time, more than the citywide average of 75%.

=== Schools and churches ===
Public elementary schools, defined as kindergarten through 5th grades, include PS 29 and PS 129. College Point is home to St. Fidelis Parish, founded in 1856. The present church was completed in 1906. Adjacent to the church is the grave of Father Huber, the founding pastor. For over 150 years, the parish conducted an elementary school including kindergarten through 8th grades. In 1924, St. Fidelis School, a three-story building of 18 classrooms, opened its doors on the present 14th Avenue and 124th Street. In 1961, the 12 classroom annex was opened. In its heyday, St. Fidelis School had almost two thousand students, from kindergarten through grade 8. When it closed, there were just over 200 students. During all of these years, it was staffed by the Dominican Sisters of Amityville (Dominican Sisters of the American Congregation of the Holy Cross). Due to significant demographic changes in College Point, the elementary school was finally closed in June 2013.

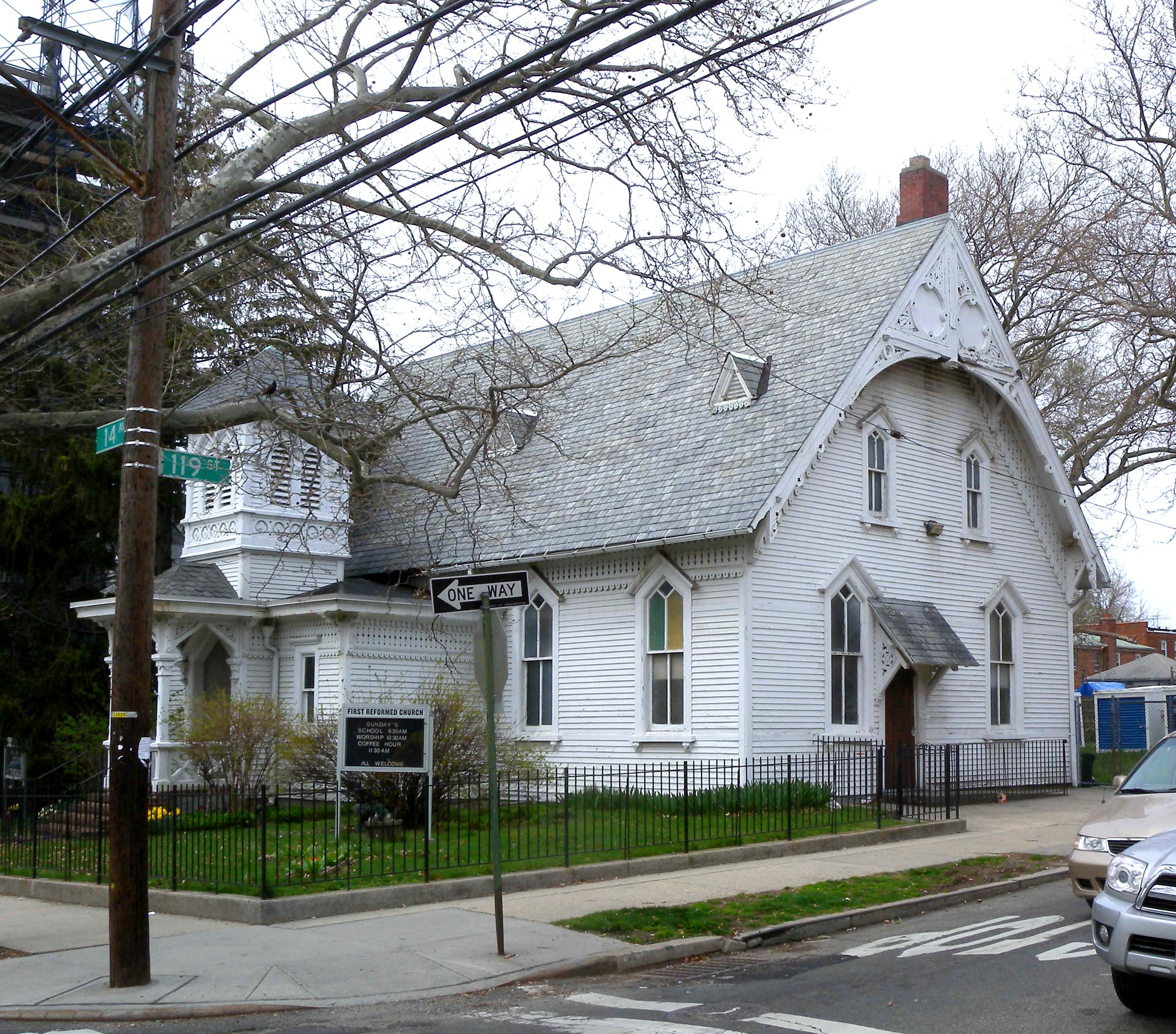
Sanctuary of First Reformed Church on 119th St

Up until Vatican II, St. Fidelis was a thriving parish. For many years, it was led by Father (and eventually Monsignor) William J. Osborne. Monsignor Osborne died in 1998 at the age of 102, the oldest living Catholic priest in the United States at the time. In the 1950s and 1960s, there were four daily masses in St. Fidelis Parish, as well as ten Sunday masses in three venues. Currently, with diminished enrollments and changing demographics, there is one daily mass, and four Sunday masses, one in Spanish.

St. Agnes Academic High School, a private Catholic high and independent of St. Fidelis parish, had been operating for over one hundred years. In its early years, it was very briefly co-educational, but it ultimately was restricted to girls. It was owned and staffed by the Dominican Sisters of Amityville, assisted by lay men and women. For many years, Reverend Mother Agatha, O.P., was superior and principal of St. Agnes High School. The Dominican Sisters reside in Saint Agnes Convent as well as the Harbor of Grace Convent, which was the original convent for this community. In June 2018, The Harbor of Grace Convent permanently closed, since the Diocese of Brooklyn wished to reclaim the building. The Harbor of Grace, first opened in the early 1970s, with Sr. Julianne (Nora Daniel) Connolly, O.P. being one of its pioneers. Sister Julianne had lived there for its entire history until it was closed permanently in 2018. St. Agnes Convent, the last of the Dominican Convents in College Point, closed in 2019. St Agnes Convent, the landmark of "High Street" for almost two centuries, then faced the wrecker ball and by November, 2022, this historical edifice was completely gone. In June 2021, St. Agnes High School closed permanently. Financial factors, significant changes in demographics and the toll of COVID-19 were factors leading to this decision. For the first time in nearly two centuries, no Catholic school was operating within College Point / the St Fidelis parish complex, and the Dominican Sisters, and their convents, are gone forever. Given the diminishing number of Catholics in North Queens, it is probable that the parish of St Fidelis will merge with Holy Trinity and St Luke's parish in the not too distant future. By 2022, the church building as well as the rectory, housing the parish priests, are the only remaining and functioning structures of the parish complex.

St. Fidelis Roman Catholic Church, St. John's Lutheran, and The First Reformed Church of College Point host the community's three largest congregations.

=== Libraries ===
The Queens Public Library's Poppenhusen branch is located at 121-23 14th Avenue.

== Recreation ==
=== Parks ===
- MacNeil Park, formerly known as College Point Shorefront Park as well as Chisholm's by many locals (after the family that owned the mansion that once stood in the park), features a water front view, full playground, basketball and handball courts, and baseball fields. The Chisholm's Mansion was located at the highest part of the park, overlooking the East River and Rikers Island. This mansion served as the summer residence of Mayor Fiorello LaGuardia during his term of office as Mayor of New York.
- Poppenhusen Playground is a park for primary school-aged children.
- College Point Park, the former location of P.S. 27, is located across the street from Poppenhusen Library.It is called "27" by many locals. It has basketball and handball courts as well as an adjacent municipal parking lot.
- Powell's Cove Park, an environmental waterfront park, lies on the border of College Point and Malba and affords a great view of the Bronx–Whitestone Bridge.
- Frank Golden Memorial Park, located behind the strip mall on 14th Avenue, features 4 baseball diamonds and is used by local softball leagues. This park also features a playground with a swing-set and jungle gym with slides. Next to the playground is a basketball court and a handball wall.

=== Sports ===
- College Point Sports Park: College Point is home to a newly reconstructed hockey rink on Ulmer Street complete with floodlights and bleachers, which was part of a larger reconstruction of the College Point Fields. The baseball fields and hockey rink are now New York City Department of Parks and Recreation Fields, but the entire property used to belong to the College Sports Association, which leased the fields from the city for $1 a day.
- College Point Little League: The College Point Little League, based out of the College Point Little League Building, is chartered by Little League Baseball in Williamsport, and serves the College Point, Flushing, and Whitestone areas of Queens. The College Point Little League is an all volunteer organization dedicated to providing boys and girls, ages 5 through 18, a place where they can build their baseball skills while learning good sportsmanship, fair play, teamwork, and most of all, having fun.
- College Point Stars: The College Point Stars (not affiliated with the College Point Little League) are a youth baseball team that advanced to the 2007 Cal Ripken Babe Ruth League Division World Series.

== Notable structures ==
=== Landmarks and historic buildings ===
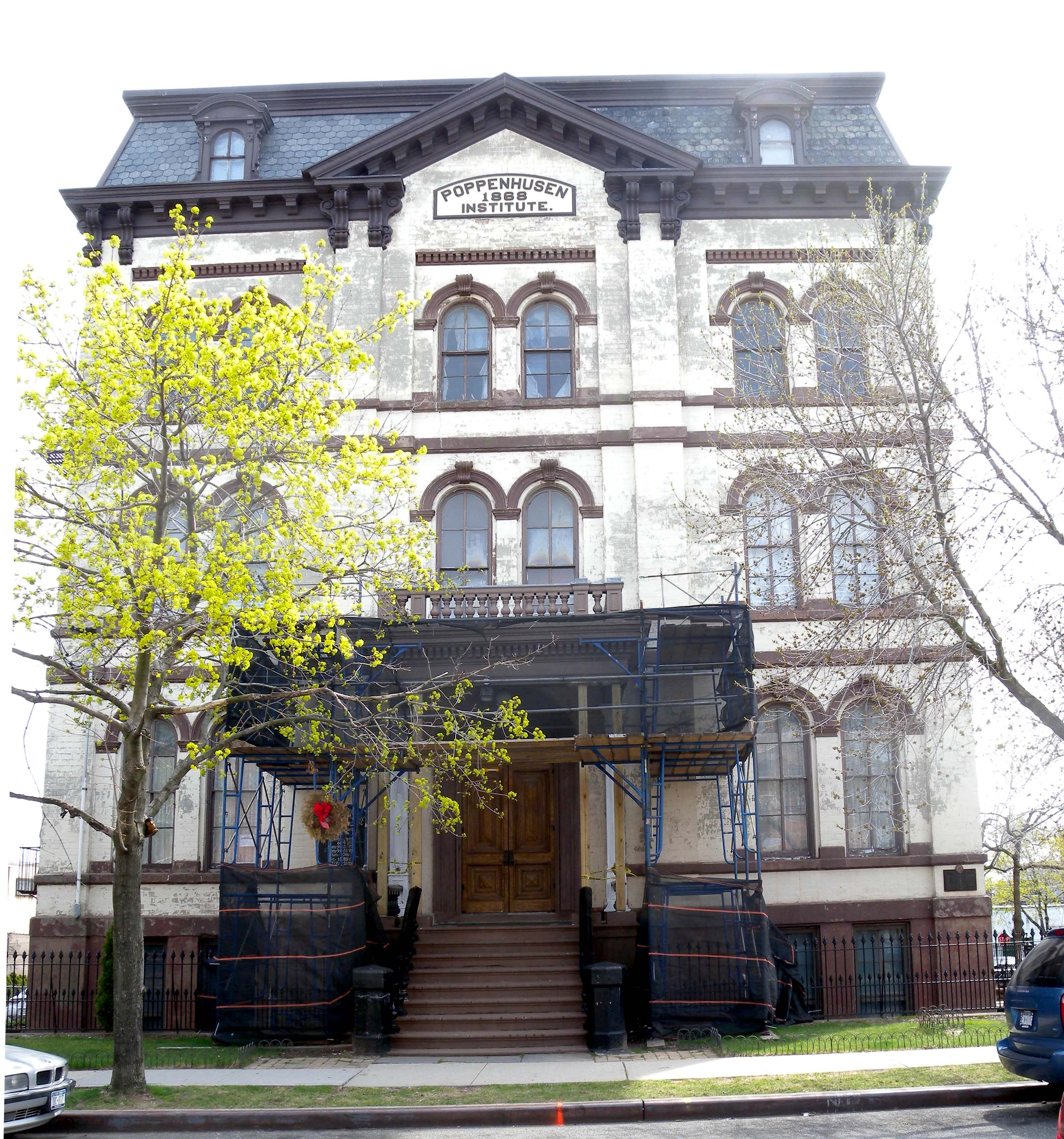
Poppenhusen Institute on the NRHP

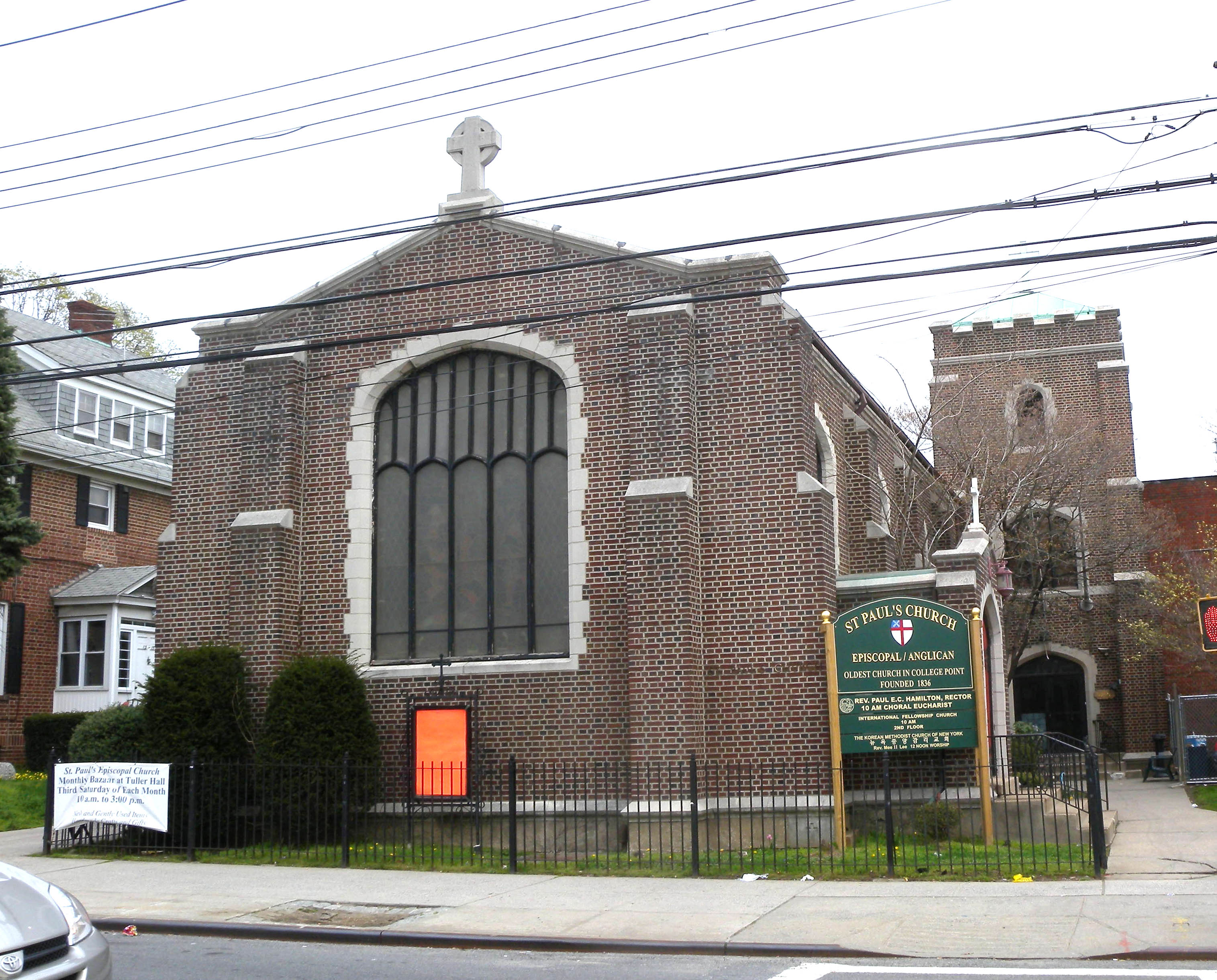
St Paul's Episcopal

- Academy Mailbox & Intercom Company – a gray-facaded warehouse on 15th Avenue built circa 1870. The building was originally used as an ice house to chill beer from a local brewery.
- College Point Little League Building – a listed on the National Register of Historic Places in 2000 as Firemen's Hall.
- Farrington's Service Station – The oldest Gulf gas station in the state and possibly the oldest gas station in Queens. It was founded in the 1860s at the corner of 126th Street and 15th Avenue as a blacksmith shop and transformed into a gas station and auto service center in the early 1900s. The building has been renovated several times over the past 150 years and is still in operation on the same corner.
- First Reformed Church – A church built in 1872 in the small town New England style. The church is on a large lot, has a bell tower, and is adorned with "gingerbread" trim. On June 6, 2008, a fire caused damage in the steeple, which was repaired, maintaining the historical appearance of the building. (Up on 119th Street) In 2018 it was listed on the National Register.
- Poppenhusen Institute – Built in 1868 by Conrad Poppenhusen, the founder of College Point. The architecture features a French Second Empire Mansard roof topping off the three Italianate style stories. During the entire Civil War, the Poppenhusen Institute building housed the disassembled Abraham Lincoln's log cabin. After the war, it was returned to Hodgenville Kentucky, the current site of the log cabin. The institute's other claim to fame is that it conducted America's first free kindergarten. Originally a town hall, this City Landmark now serves as a cultural and historical center and offers a variety of classes and activities.
- Schleicher Court – A mansion built in 1857 by Morris A. Gescheidt, it is located in the middle of 123rd Street at 13th Avenue. The mansion was built for Herman A. and Malvina Schleicher, and it is the only remaining 19th-century mansion in College Point built for a German-American family. From 1892 to 1923, John Jockers operated the Grand View Hotel at the property, at a time when College Point was a waterfront resort area. The house was divided into apartments in 1923. After the house had an electrical fire on July 9, 2008, the house was forcibly vacated by the Department of Buildings because of hazardous electrical conditions. The house was made a New York City designated landmark in 2009.
- Spangelberg Mansion – A yellow and white-facaded mansion circa 1860 now also divided into apartments.

=== Shopping and entertainment ===
- Farrington's Service Station was established in the 1860s on the corner of 126th Street and 15th Avenue as a blacksmith shop. John Farrington, a blacksmith, later transformed it into a gas station and auto service center in the early 1900s. The Farrington family still owns and operates the gas station on the same corner. It is the oldest Gulf station in the state.
- Empire Market on College Point Boulevard has sold German meats and groceries since 1920 and is owned by the Lepine's a third-generation German family. The store also offers a wide variety of candy in glass jars and is a favorite among children.
- College Meat Center, family owned and operated since 1963, has been serving local residents for over 40 years, surviving a fire in the 1980s.
- A strip mall-style shopping center on 20th Avenue includes several major chain retail stores, restaurants and a supermarket.
- De Point on 127th Street and 20th Avenue, an eco-friendly lifestyle center, was opened in 2012, with views of the Manhattan skyline, and a number restaurants, a spa, a swimming pool, a hotel, children's corner, rooftop garden restaurant and lounge and various shops.
- The College Point Multiplex Cinemas has 12 movie screens, as well as a mini-arcade.

=== Other points of interest ===
Flushing Airport, opened in 1927 along the shore of Flushing Bay, had been a busy aviation hub before LaGuardia Airport was built in 1939 about one mile away. It carried the IATA code FLU. In 1977, a Piper Twin Comanche crashed shortly after taking off from the airport. The incident eventually led to the closing of this airport in 1984. The site remains abandoned, although plans have been proposed over the years to convert it into a blimp-port or office park.

The printing plant for The New York Times is located in College Point as well, along the Whitestone Expressway just east of the former airport.

The Tallman Island Wastewater Treatment Plant is located at 127th Street near Powell's Cove. Tallman Island was formerly a separate island, but was fused to College Point in the mid-20th century. The island formerly contained a small resort with a hotel and dancing and dining pavilions until the 1930s. The wastewater plant was erected between 1937 and 1939, and was dedicated in April 1939.

== Transportation ==
MTA Regional Bus Operations' Q20, Q25, Q26, Q50 and Q76 local lines and QM2, QM20 and QM32 express lines serve the neighborhood. No New York City Subway lines have ever been built to the area, although a spur from the IRT Flushing Line (present-day 7 and <7> trains) was proposed during much of the early 20th century. The Long Island Rail Road's Whitestone Branch used to run through the area until it closed in 1932.

== Notable people ==
Notable current and former residents of College Point include:

- David Gallagher (born 1985), actor who portrayed "Simon Camden" on the show 7th Heaven
- Sebastián Guenzatti (born 1991) soccer player who plays for Tampa Bay Rowdies in the USL Championship.
- Steve Karsay (born 1972), Major League Baseball pitcher.
- Conrad Poppenhusen (1818–1883), founder of College Point, education innovator, hard rubber manufacturer, railroad tycoon and German-born philanthropist
- Reuben Nakian (1897-1986), was an American sculptor and teacher of Armenian extraction.

== See also ==
- Geography of New York City
- List of Queens neighborhoods
