= Poppenhusen Institute =

Historic building in Queens, New York

- U.S. National Register of Historic Places
- New York City Landmark
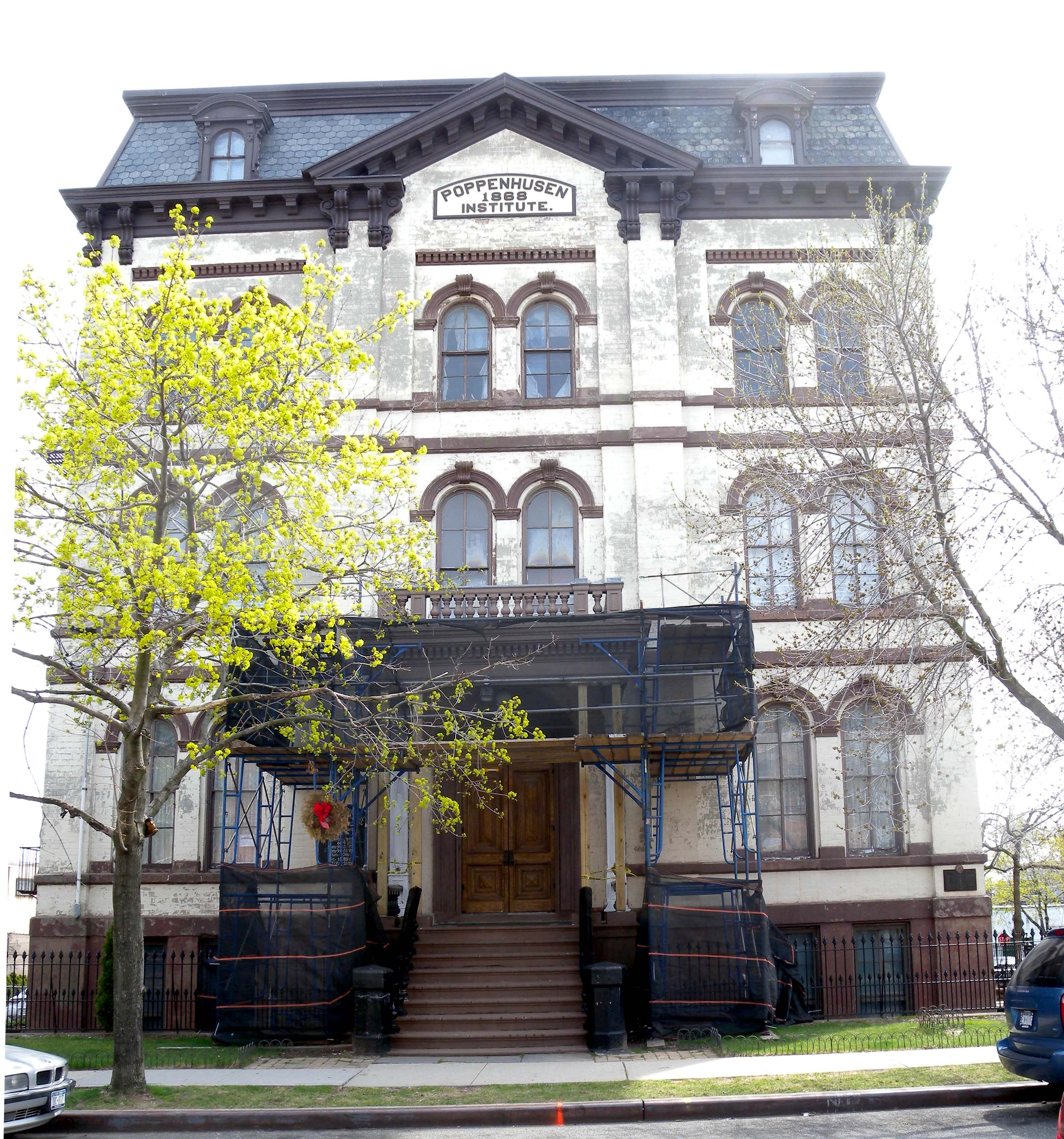
- Location: 114-04 14th Rd., College Point, Queens, New York
- Coordinates: 40°47′4″N 73°51′12″W
- Area: less than one acre
- Built: 1868
- Architect: Mundell & Teckritz
- Architectural style: Stern Victorian
- NRHP reference No.: 77000973
- NYCL No.: 0662

Significant dates
- Added to NRHP: August 18, 1977
- Designated NYCL: August 18, 1970

Poppenhusen Institute is a historic building at 114-04 14th Road in College Point, Queens, New York, that housed the first free kindergarten in the United States. In addition, this institute provided the first free evening classes for adults in the US. Currently, the Institute operates as a community cultural center. The institute building is five stories tall and was constructed in a stern Victorian style.

It was designated a municipal landmark by the New York City Landmarks Preservation Commission in 1970 and then added to the National Register of Historic Places in 1977.

== Description and history ==
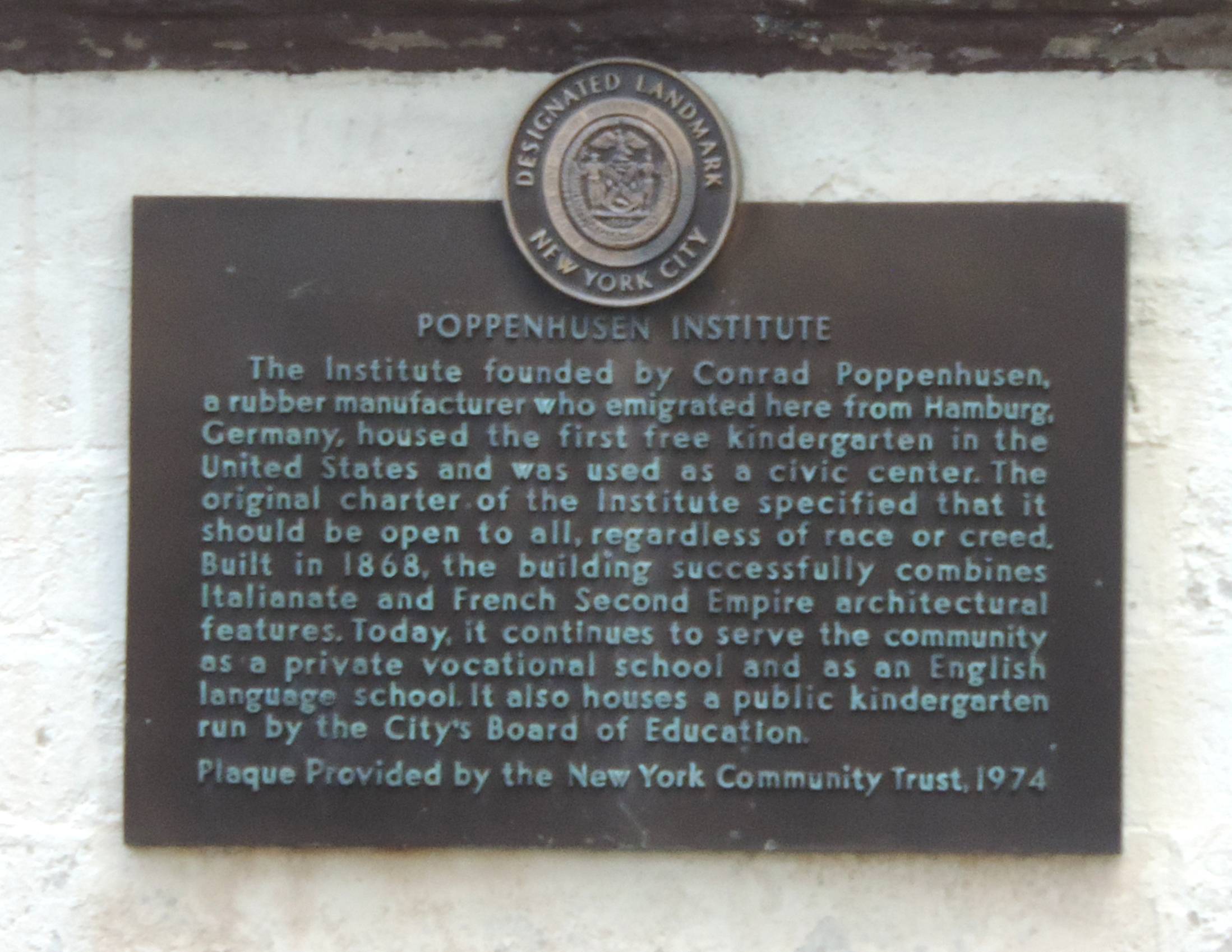
Landmark plaque

It was constructed in 1868 with private funds donated by Conrad Poppenhusen, the benefactor of College Point, New York. He began work on the institute on his 50th birthday in 1868, when he provided $100,000 to set up this project as a private educational venture: this venture remains one of the principal features of College Point. Conrad Poppenhusen's zeal, ability, and civic pride brought unprecedented prosperity to College Point. The Poppenhusen Institute is similar to the Cooper Union Institute in Manhattan: the reason for this is because the so-called "home arts" and the study of machinery were principally taught free to ambitious residents of the North Shore.

The original charter specified that it be open to all, irrespective of race, creed or religion, giving people the opportunity to improve their lives either by preparing them for better jobs or improving their leisure time. The institute was established for vocational training and is also served in the interests of Poppenhusen to provide educational opportunities for industrial workers. This institute was also built with the purpose of teaching English and factory crafts: even though it was still teaching these classes, the English courses have been supplemented or replaced by those in French and Spanish. The reason for this was because certain individuals felt their English was good enough. In addition, there were more sophisticated classes which taught draftsmanship and machine shop techniques for local workers in electronic plants. Along with these classes, the Poppenhusen Institute contained and provided scientific and historical collections, chemical and philosophical apparatus, books, drawings, pictures, statues, and other such means of education and instruction.

The institute housed the Justice of the Peace, the first home of the College Point Savings Bank, German Singing Societies, the first library in the area, a court room, the Sheriff's Office (2 jail cells remain today), as well as the first free kindergarten in the United States which began here on July 1, 1870."

Furthermore, this institute was also established for the protection, care, and custody of infants under the age of five years. The institute, to this day, has survived and is well known as a recognized trade school, enrolling about 400 men and women a year for evening classes.

The Poppenhusen Institute also became the location in which many historical exhibits and artifacts of Queens were displayed. In 1962, around Spring time in May, the first anniversary of the opening of the College Point Historical Room commenced at the institute and included a new exhibit on "Volunteer Fire Fighting Companies at College Point. Conrad Poppenhusen started the Enterprise Engine Company Two in 1861. A group called the smokeeaters later changed the unit's name to Enterprise Hose Company and established headquarters in the barns adjoining the institute's property on 14th road: this occurred after the engine was retired from service in 1875. The exhibit displayed fire equipment used during the 1800s.

== Residents ==
From 1968 to 1985, the Ponce Family lived within Poppenhusen Institute from January 1968 to December 1985. Dominick Ponce updated the electrical wiring and plumbing in the building and was entrusted provide care for the property and oversee it. Dominick Ponce died February 14, 2011.

== See also ==
- List of New York City Designated Landmarks in Queens
- National Register of Historic Places listings in Queens County, New York
