= College Point Little League Building =

Building in Queens, New York

- Firemen's Hall
- U.S. National Register of Historic Places
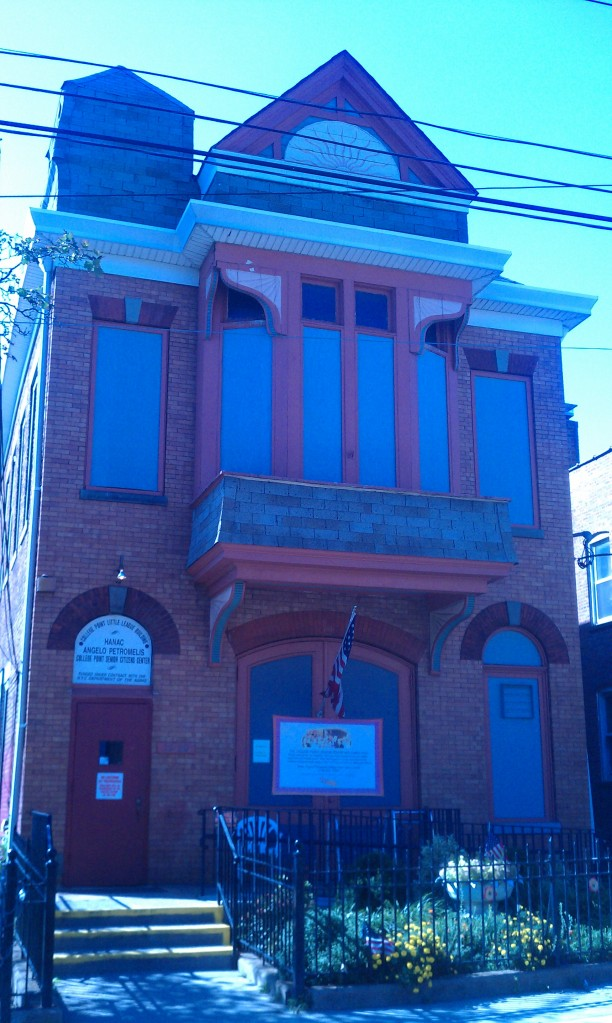

- Location within New York City Location within New York Location within the United States
- Location: 13-28 123rd St., College Point, New York
- Coordinates: 40°47′9″N 73°50′42″W
- Area: less than one acre
- Built: 1906
- Architect: Shreiner, Peter
- Architectural style: Queen Anne
- NRHP reference No.: 00001013
- Added to NRHP: August 31, 2000

Firemen's Hall is a historic meeting hall located in the College Point section of the New York City borough of Queens. It was built in 1906-1907 and is a two-story, rectangular brick building with a hipped roof in the Queen Anne style. A small rear addition was built about 1936. It was built for the Exempt Firemen's Benevolent Association of College Point. Although owned by the College Point Little League, the building is used by a number of community groups as a meeting and social hall.

It was listed on the National Register of Historic Places in 2000.
