= Conrad Poppenhusen =

German American businessman

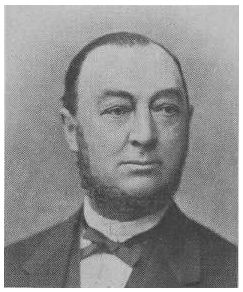
Conrad Poppenhusen

Conrad Poppenhusen (April 1, 1818 – December 12, 1883) was a German American businessman. He was also a philanthropist, a founder of College Point, Queens, and the founder of the first free kindergarten in the United States (on July 1, 1870).

== Early life ==
Poppenhusen was born in Hamburg, Germany, in 1818.

== Career ==
Poppenhusen worked for a whalebone purchaser before immigrating to the United States in 1843 to start a whalebone processing plant in Brooklyn, New York, New York. In 1852 Poppenhusen received a license from Charles Goodyear to produce hard rubber products and subsequently moved the company to a small rural village in Queens.

College Point was founded in 1870 when Poppenhusen incorporated the neighborhoods of Flammersburg and Strattonport together. For his workers in the area, Poppenhusen built housing, the First Reformed Church, and numerous streets.

In 1868 Poppenhusen founded the Flushing and North Side Railroad which connected College Point and Flushing, Queens with ferries to Manhattan. (Today the tracks connect to Manhattan directly via tunnels, but no longer to College Point.) In that same year he also founded the Poppenhusen Institute, containing a vocational high school and in 1870, added the first free kindergarten.

== Post-career ==
After Poppenhusen retired in 1871, his three sons lost much of his fortune, and he declared bankruptcy for over $4 million (at least about $130 million — or perhaps as much as $1.9 billion — in 2024 dollars).

== Family and personal life ==
Poppenhusen married Bertha Marie Henrietta Karker in May 1841. They had four children: sons Adolph Conrad (1842–1882), Heinrich Conrad (1846–1847), Herman Christian (1847–1891) and Alfred (1850–1887), and daughter Marie (1849–1874).

Conrad Poppenhusen died in College Point in 1883 and was memorialized by the community with a bust in Poppenhusen Park in 1884. His remains were stored temporarily in nearby Flushing Cemetery and were then shipped months later to his native Germany where they were buried in Ohlsdorf Cemetery in Hamburg.

The College Point branch of the Queens Library, built in 1904, bears his name. Additionally, streets in Hamburg and in College Point are named for him.
