= St. Agnes Academic High School (Queens) =

St. Agnes Academic High School.jpg
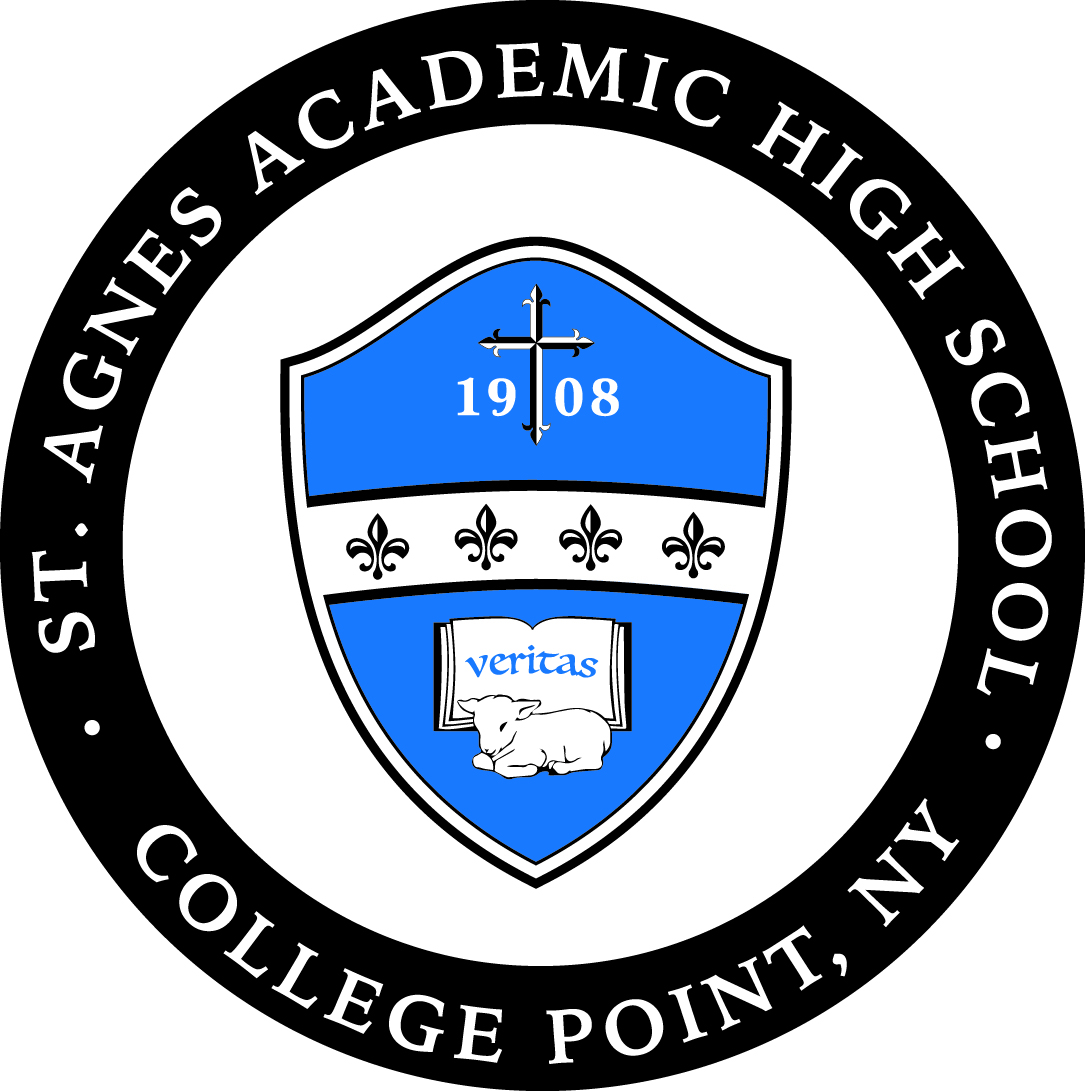

Location
- 13-20 124th Street; New York City (College Point, Queens), New York 11356; United States; 40°47′9″N 73°50′39″W

Information
- Type: Private, All-Female
- Religious affiliations: Roman Catholic; Sisters of St. Dominic
- Established: 1908
- Closed: 2021
- School code: 018
- Principal: Susan Nicoletti
- Faculty: 30
- Grades: 9-12
- Average class size: 26
- Colors: Blue and White
- Slogan: College Point, College Bound
- Athletics conference: CHSAA
- Sports: Basketball (Junior Varsity/Varsity), Bowling, Cheer-leading, Cross Country, Soccer, Softball, Track, Volleyball (Junior Varsity/Varsity)
- Team name: Blue Angels
- Accreditation: Middle States Association of Colleges and Schools
- Newspaper: Veritas
- Yearbook: Agnesene
- Tuition: $9,300 (2019-2020)
- Alumni Magazine: Agnews
- Website: http://www.stagneshs.org

St. Agnes Academic High School is a former all-girls, private, Roman Catholic high school in Queens, New York. It was located within the Roman Catholic Diocese of Brooklyn, and was established in 1908 by the Sisters of St. Dominic.

St. Agnes held its first graduation for 6 students in 1912. The school was originally co-educational, but shifted its focus to all-girls education in the aftermath of the Second World War. The current building was built in 1958.

St. Agnes had been affiliated with the Catholic University of America, Washington, D.C., and been accredited by the Middle States Association of Colleges and Schools.

The school was closed in June 2021 due to financial hardships.
