= Kindergarten =

Preschool educational approach

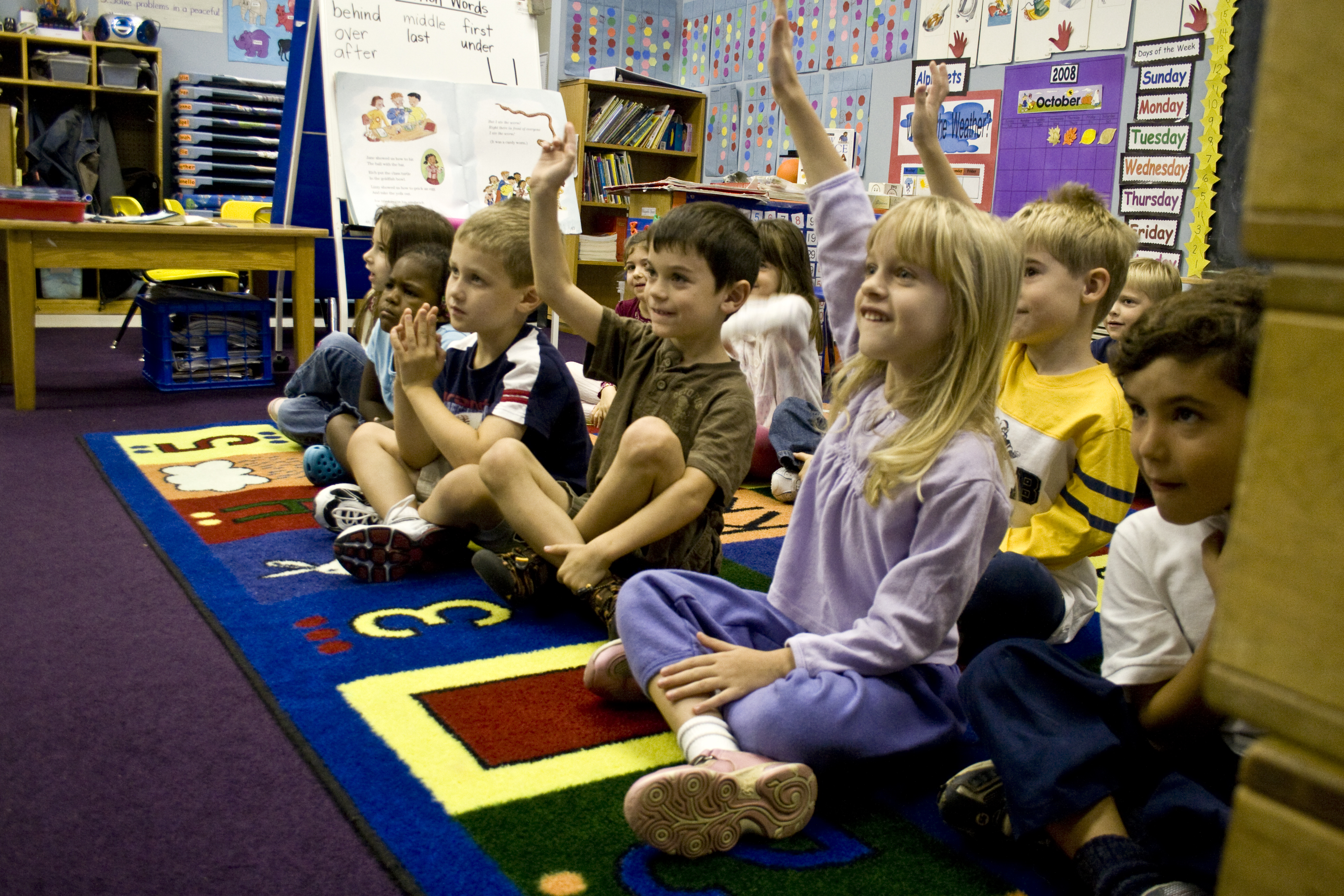
A kindergarten classroom

Kindergarten (UK: /ˈkɪndəˌɡɑːt(ə)n/, US: /ˈkɪndəɹˌɡɑːɹt(ə)n/, /ˈkɪndəɹˌɡɑːɹd(ə)n/) is a preschool educational approach based on playing, singing, practical activities such as drawing, and social interaction as part of the transition from home to school. Such institutions were originally made in the late 18th century in Germany and Alsace to serve children whose parents both worked outside home. The term was coined by German pedagogue Friedrich Fröbel, whose approach globally influenced early-years education. Today, the term is used in many countries to describe various educational institutions and learning spaces for children ranging from two to six years of age, based on various teaching methods.

== Etymology ==
The term is an adopted borrowing, barring the lack of the capitalization, of the German word Kindergarten (German: [ˈkɪndərˌɡartən]), which was coined in 1840 by pedagogue Friedrich Fröbel. It comes from terms Kind ('child') and Garten ('garden'), literally meaning "garden of children", as a "metaphorical sense of "place where children can grow in a natural way". The term is sometimes misspelled as a partial English calque in form of kindergarden.

== History ==
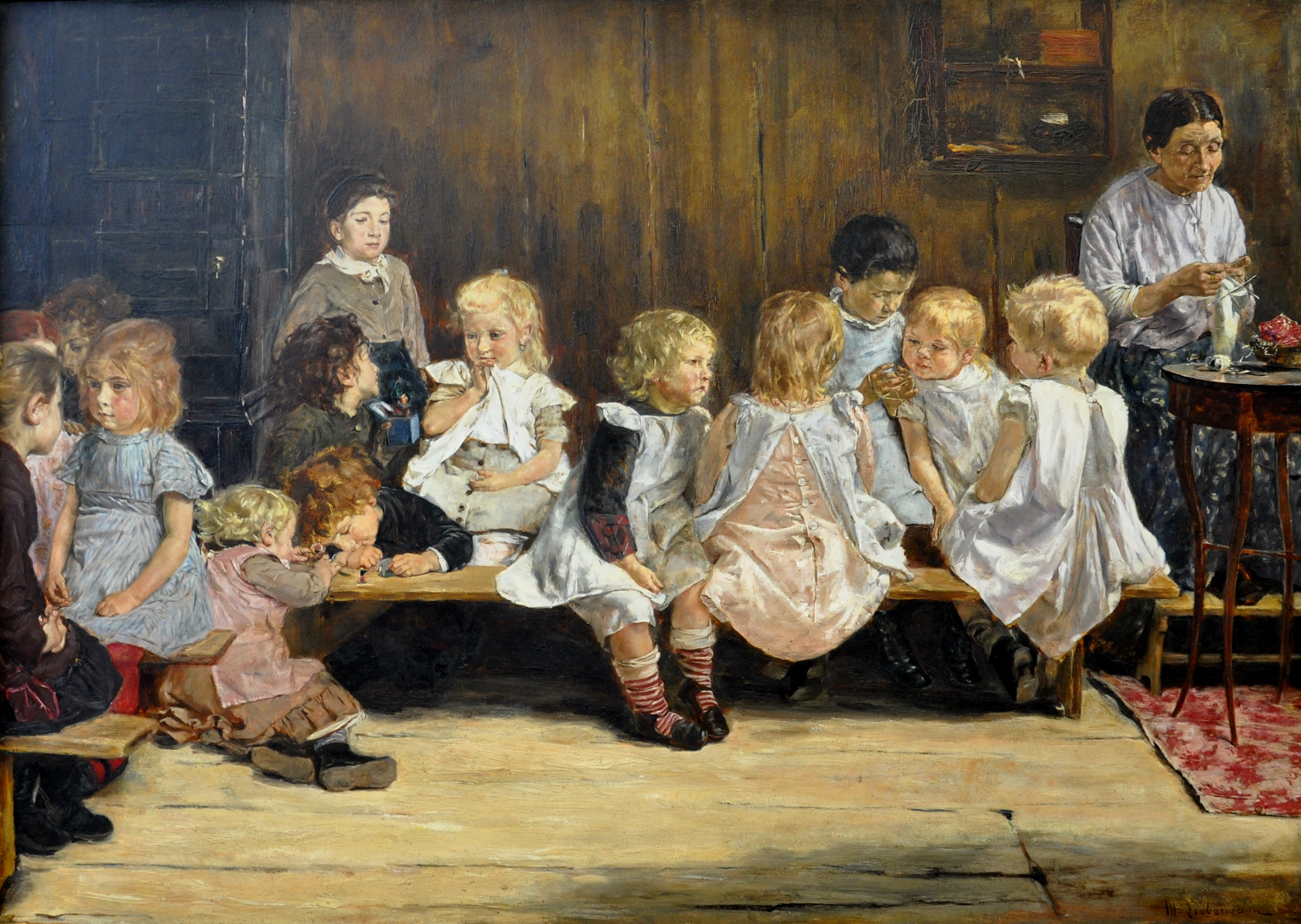
Kindergarten in Amsterdam 1880, by Max Liebermann

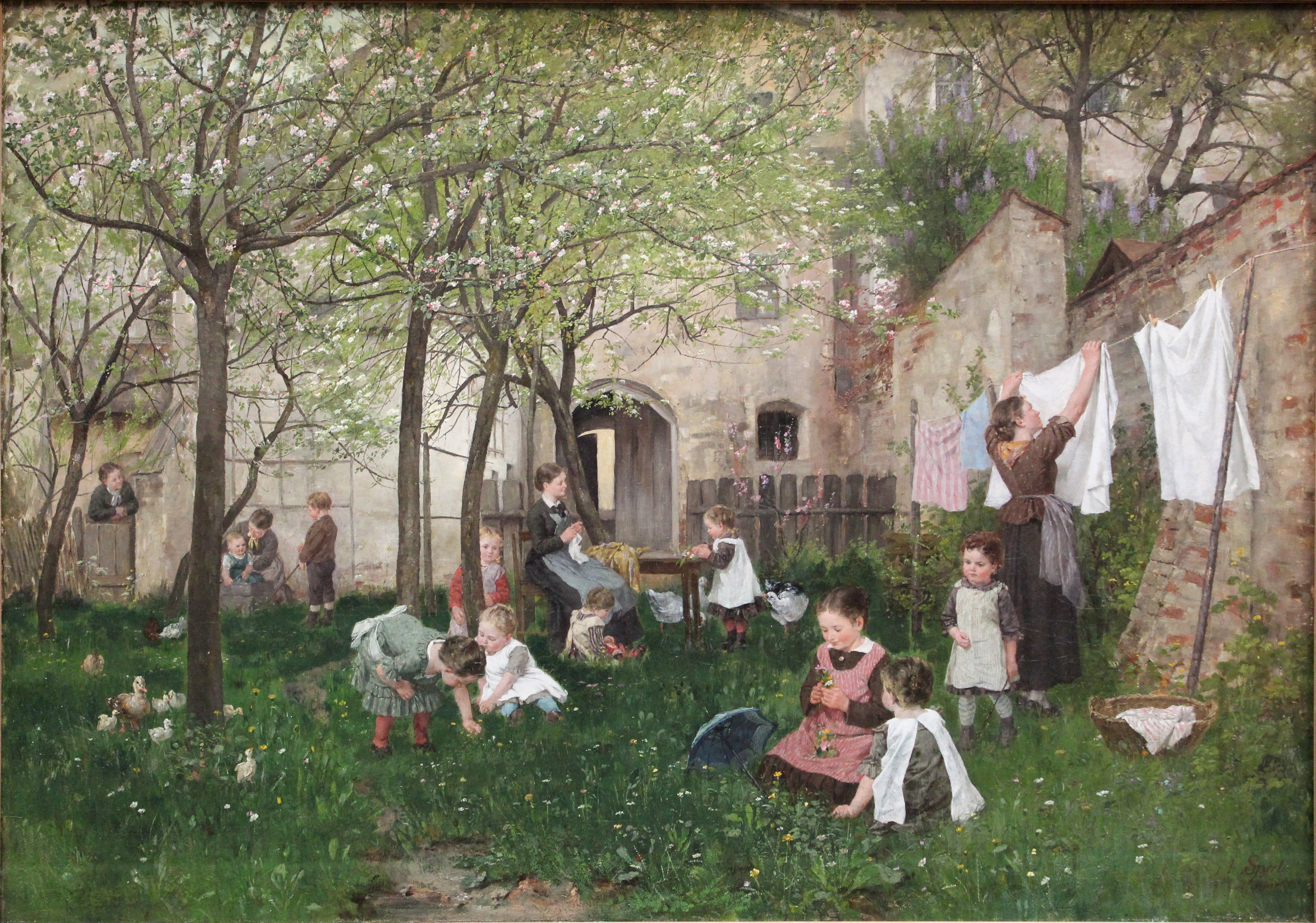
Kindergarten, by Johann Sperl, circa 1885

=== Background ===
In 1779, Johann Friedrich Oberlin and Louise Scheppler founded in Strasbourg an early establishment for caring for and educating preschool children whose parents were absent during the day. At about the same time, in 1780, similar infant establishments were created in Bavaria. In 1802, Princess Pauline zur Lippe established a preschool center in Detmold, the capital of the then principality of Lippe, Germany (now in the State of North Rhine-Westphalia).

In 1816, Robert Owen, a philosopher and pedagogue, opened the first British and probably globally the first infants school in New Lanark, Scotland. In conjunction with his venture for cooperative mills, Owen wanted the children to be given a good moral education so that they would be fit for work. His system was successful in producing obedient children with basic literacy and numeracy.

Samuel Wilderspin opened his first infant school in London in 1819, and went on to establish hundreds more. He published many works on the subject, and his work became the model for infant schools in Great Britain and further afield. Play was an important part of Wilderspin's system of education. He is credited with inventing the playground. In 1823, Wilderspin published On the Importance of Educating the Infant Poor, based on the school. He began working for the Infant School Society the next year, informing others about his views. He also wrote The Infant System, for developing the physical, intellectual, and moral powers of all children from 1 to seven years of age.

Countess Theresa Brunszvik (1775–1861), who had known and been influenced by Johann Heinrich Pestalozzi, was influenced by this example to open an Angyalkert ('angel garden' in Hungarian) on May 27, 1828, in her residence in Buda, the first of eleven care centers that she founded for young children. In 1836 she established an institute for the foundation of preschool centers. The idea became popular among the nobility and the middle class and was copied throughout the Kingdom of Hungary.

=== Creation of the kindergarten ===
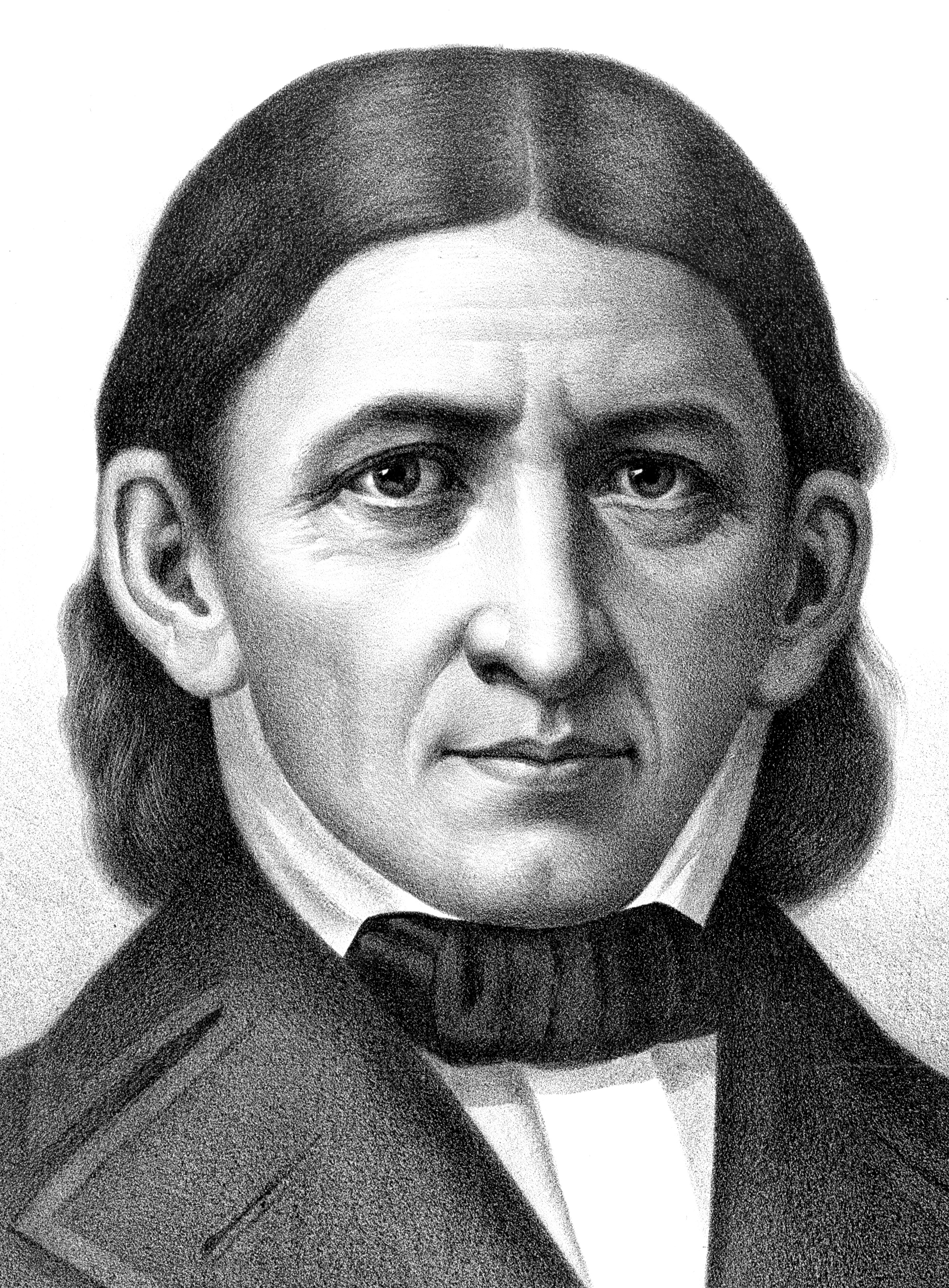
Friedrich Fröbel was one of the most influential founders of kindergartens, also coining the word in 1840.

Friedrich Fröbel (1782–1852) opened a "play and activity" institute in 1837, in Bad Blankenburg, in the principality of Schwarzburg-Rudolstadt, as an experimental social experience for children entering school. He renamed his institute Kindergarten (meaning "garden of children") on June 28, 1840, reflecting his belief that children should be nurtured and nourished "like plants in a garden". Fröbel introduced a pedagogical environment where children could develop through their own self-expression and self-directed learning, facilitated by play, songs, stories, and various other activities; this was in contrast to earlier infant establishments, and Fröbel is therefore credited with the creation of the kindergarten. Around 1873, Caroline Wiseneder's method for teaching instrumental music to young children was adopted by the national kindergarten movement in Germany.

In 1840, the well-connected educator Emily Ronalds was the first British person to study Fröbel's approach and he urged her to transplant his kindergarten concepts in England. Later, women trained by Fröbel opened kindergartens throughout Europe and around the world. The first kindergarten in the US was founded in Watertown, Wisconsin, in 1856, and was conducted in German by Margaretha Meyer-Schurz.

Elizabeth Peabody founded the first English-language kindergarten in the US in 1860. The first free kindergarten in the US was founded in 1870 by Conrad Poppenhusen, a German industrialist and philanthropist, who also established the Poppenhusen Institute. The first publicly financed kindergarten in the US was established in St. Louis in 1873 by Susan Blow.

Canada's first private kindergarten was opened by the Wesleyan Methodist Church in Charlottetown, Prince Edward Island, in 1870. By the end of the decade, they were common in large Canadian towns and cities. In 1882, The country's first public-school kindergartens were established in Berlin, Ontario (modern Kitchener) at the Central School. In 1885, the Toronto Normal School (teacher training) opened a department for kindergarten teaching.

The Australian kindergarten movement emerged in the last decade of the nineteenth century as both a philanthropic and educational endeavour. The first free kindergarten in Australia was established in 1896 in Sydney, New South Wales, by the Kindergarten Union of NSW (now KU Children's Services) led by reformer Maybanke Anderson.

American educator Elizabeth Harrison wrote extensively on the theory of early childhood education and worked to enhance educational standards for kindergarten teachers by establishing what became the National College of Education in 1886.

== By country ==
=== Afghanistan ===
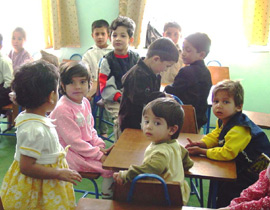
A kindergarten classroom in Afghanistan

In Afghanistan, children between the ages of three and six attend kindergartens (Dari: کودکستان, romanized: kōdakistān; Pashto: وړکتون, romanized: woṛëktun). Although kindergartens in Afghanistan are not part of the school system, they are often run by the government.

Early childhood development programs were first introduced during the Soviet occupation with the establishment in 1980 of 27 urban preschools. The number of preschools grew steadily during the 1980s, peaking in 1990 with more than 270 in Afghanistan. At its peak, there were 2,300 teachers caring for more than 21,000 children in the country. These facilities were an urban phenomenon, mostly in Kabul, and were attached to schools, government offices, or factories. Based on the Soviet model, these early childhood development programs provided nursery care, preschool, and kindergarten for children from three months to six years of age under the direction of the Department of Labor and Social Welfare.

The vast majority of Afghan families were never exposed to this system, and many of these families were in opposition to these programs due to the belief that it diminishes the central role of the family and inculcates children with Soviet values. With the onset of civil war after the Soviet withdrawal, the number of kindergartens dropped rapidly. By 1995, only 88 functioning facilities serving 2,110 children survived, and the Taliban restrictions on female employment eliminated all of the remaining centers in areas under their control. In 2007, there were about 260 kindergarten/preschool centers serving over 25,000 children. Though every government center is required to have an early childhood center, at present, no governmental policies deal with early childhood and no institutions have either the responsibility or the capacity to provide such services.

=== Australia ===
In each state of Australia, kindergarten (frequently referred to as kinder or kindy) means something slightly different. In Tasmania, New South Wales and the Australian Capital Territory, it is the first year of primary school. In Victoria, kindergarten is a form of preschool and may be referred to interchangeably as preschool or kindergarten. In Victoria, Queensland and Tasmania, the term for the first year of primary school is prep (short for "preparatory"), which is followed by year 1.

In Queensland, kindergarten is usually an institution for children around the age of four and thus it is the precursor to preschool and primary education. As with Victoria and Tasmania, the first year of primary school is also called prep, which is then followed by year 1.

The year preceding the first year of primary school education in Western Australia, South Australia or the Northern Territory is referred to respectively as pre-primary, reception or transition. In Western Australia, the year preceding pre-primary is called kindergarten.

=== Bangladesh ===
In Bangladesh, the term kindergarten, or KG school (kindergarten school), is used to refer to the schooling children attend from three to six years of age. The names of the levels are nursery, shishu ('children'), etc. The view of kindergarten education has changed significantly over time. Almost every rural area now has at least one kindergarten school, with most being run in the Bengali language. They also follow the textbooks published by the National Curriculum and Textbook Board (NCTB) with slight modification, adding some extra books to the syllabus. The grades generally start from nursery (sometimes "play group"), "KG" afterwards, and end with the 5th grade. Separate from the National Education System, kindergarten contributes greatly toward achieving the Millennium Development Goal of universal primary education in Bangladesh.

=== Brazil ===
In Brazil, kindergarten (Portuguese: Jardim de Infância) is the only non-compulsory education modality, for children up to four years old completed after March 31 for the vast majority of states. From the age of four completed until March 31, the child is eligible for preschool (Pré-Escola), which is mandatory and precedes the 1st grade. When a child turns six years old between April 1 and December 31, he/she must be in kindergarten (last grade of preschool nursery school), also known as kindergarten III, also known as 3º período da Escola Infantil.

=== Bulgaria ===
In Bulgaria, the term detska gradina (детска градина) refers to the caring and schooling children attend from ages three to seven (in some cases six). Usually the children attend the detska gradina from morning until late afternoon when their parents return from work. Most Bulgarian kindergartens are public. Since 2012, two years of preschool education are compulsory. These two years of mandatory preschool education may be attended either in kindergarten or in preparatory groups at primary schools.

=== Canada ===
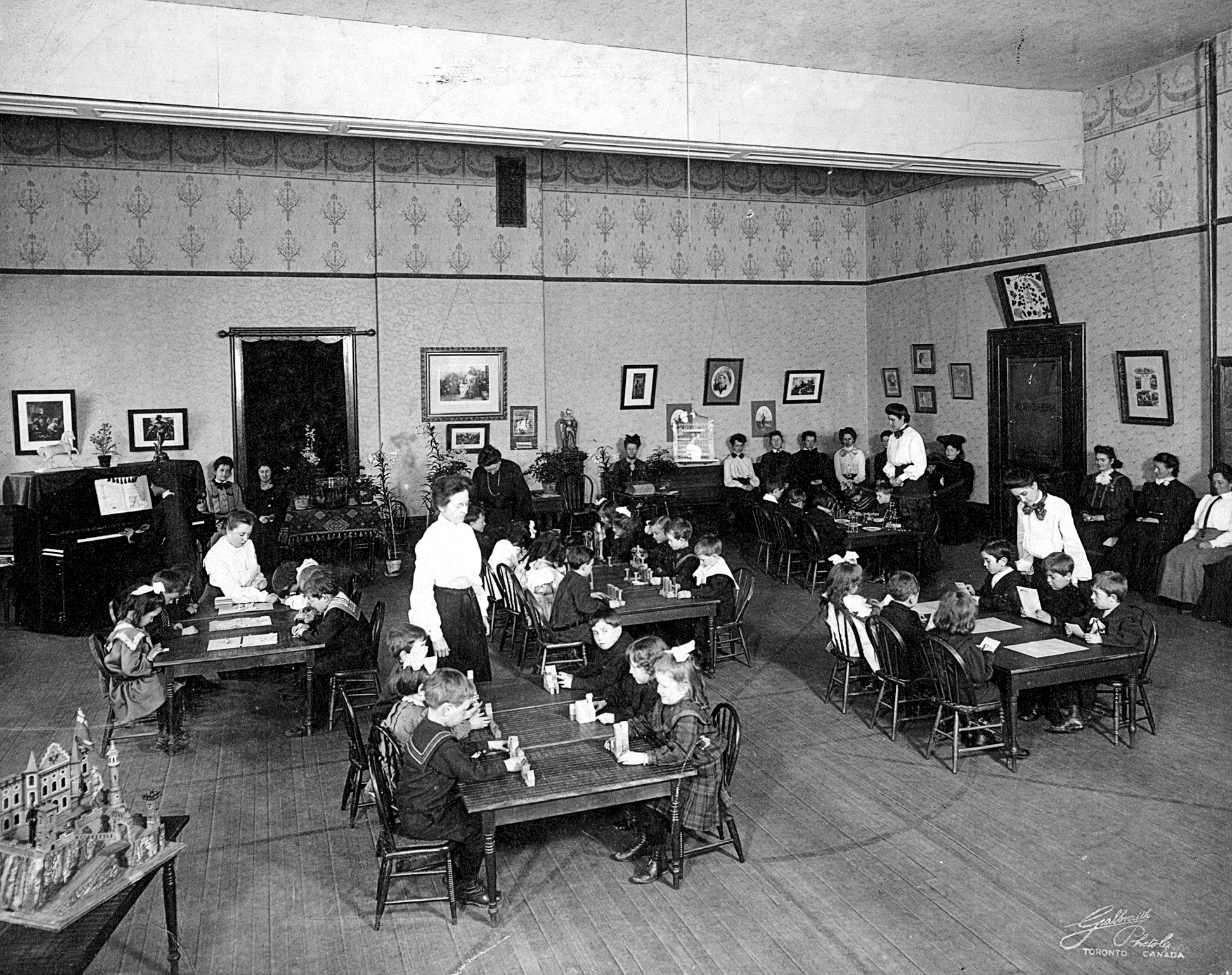
Student teachers training in a kindergarten class in 1898 in Toronto, Canada

Schools outside of Ontario and the Northwest Territories generally provide one year of kindergarten, except some private schools which offer junior kindergarten (JK) for four-year-olds (school before kindergarten is most commonly referred to as preschool). Kindergarten is mandatory in New Brunswick and Prince Edward Island, and is optional elsewhere. The province of Nova Scotia refers to kindergarten as grade primary. After kindergarten, the child begins grade one.

The province of Ontario and the Northwest Territories provide two years of kindergarten, usually part of an elementary school. Within the French school system in Ontario, junior kindergarten is called maternelle and senior kindergarten is called jardin d'enfants, which is a calque of the German word Kindergarten.

Within the province of Quebec, junior kindergarten is called prématernelle (which is not mandatory), is attended by four-year-olds, and senior kindergarten (SK) is called maternelle, which is also not mandatory by the age of five; this class is integrated into primary schools.

=== Chile ===
In Chile, the term equivalent to kindergarten is educación parvularia, sometimes also called educación preescolar. It is the first level of the Chilean educational system. It meets the needs of boys and girls integrally from birth until their entry to the educación básica (primary education), without being considered compulsory. Generally, schools imparting this level, the JUNJI (National Council of Kindergarten Schools) and other private institutions have the following organization of groups or subcategories of levels:

- Low nursery: Babies from eighty-five days to one year old.
- High nursery: Children from one to two years old.
- Low Middle Level: Children from two to three years old.
- High Middle Level: Children from three to four years old.
- First level of transition: Often called pre-kinder, for children from four to five years old.
- Second level of transition: Usually called kinder, for children from five to six years old. It is the last phase of this type of education; upon completion, children go to primero básico (first grade of primary education).

=== China ===
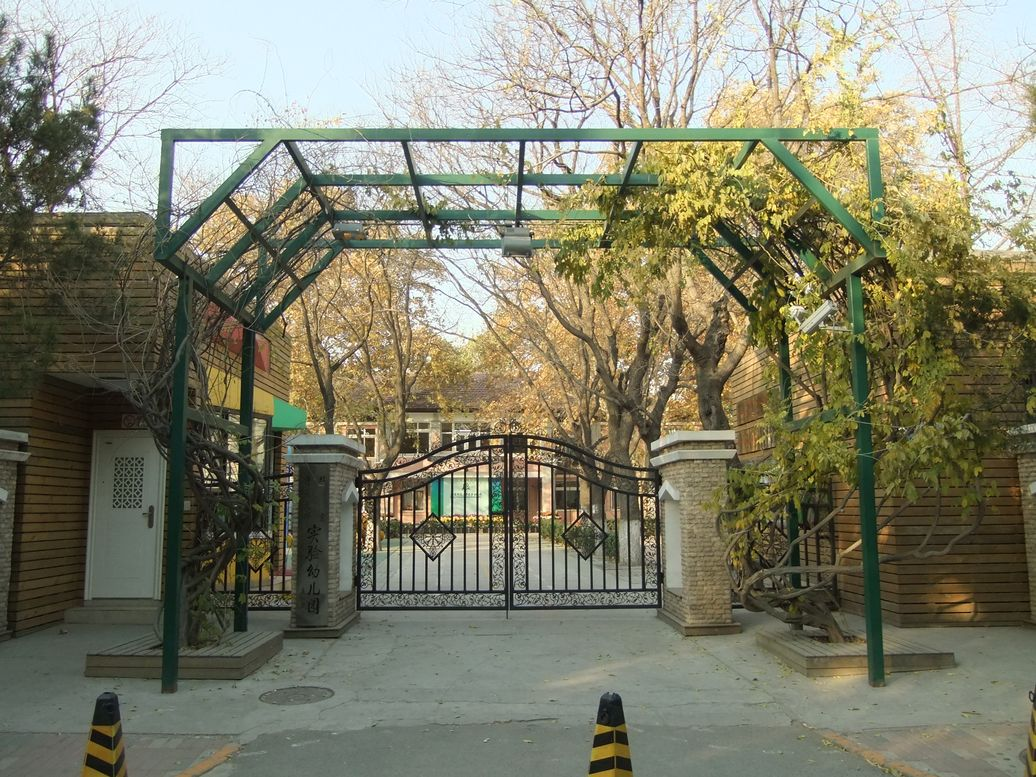
Chinese kindergarten, primary, and secondary schools are sometimes affiliated with tertiary institutions, e.g. Experimental Kindergarten of Beijing Normal University, Beijing, China.

In China, preschool education, before the child enters formal schooling at 6 years of age, is generally divided into a "nursery" or "preschool" stage and a "kindergarten" (Chinese: 幼儿园; pinyin: yòu'éryuán) stage. These can be two separate institutions, or a single combined one in different areas. Where there are two separate institutions, it is common for the kindergarten to consist of the two upper years, and the preschool to consist of one lower year. Common names for these three years are:

1. Nursery (or preschool or playgroup) (Chinese: 小班; pinyin: xiǎo bān): three- to four-year-old children
2. Lower kindergarten (Chinese: 中班; pinyin: zhōng bān): four- to five-year-old children
3. Upper kindergarten (Chinese: 大班; pinyin: dà bān): five- to six-year-old children.

In some places, children at five to six years may in addition or instead attend reception or preparatory classes (Chinese: 学前班; pinyin: xué qián bān) focusing on preparing children for formal schooling.

State (public) kindergartens only accept children older than three years, while private ones do not have such limitations.

=== Denmark ===
Kindergarten (børnehave) is a day care service offered to children from age three until the child starts attending school. Kindergarten classes (grade 0) were made mandatory in 2009 and are offered by primary schools before a child enters first grade.

Two-thirds of established day care institutions in Denmark are municipal day care centres while the other third are privately owned and are run by associations of parents or businesses in agreement with local authorities. In terms of both finances and subject matter, municipal and private institutions function according to the same principles.

Denmark is credited with pioneering (although not inventing) forest kindergartens, in which children spend most of every day outside in a natural environment.

=== Egypt ===
In Egypt, children may go to kindergarten for two years (KG1 and KG2) between the ages of four and six.

=== Finland ===
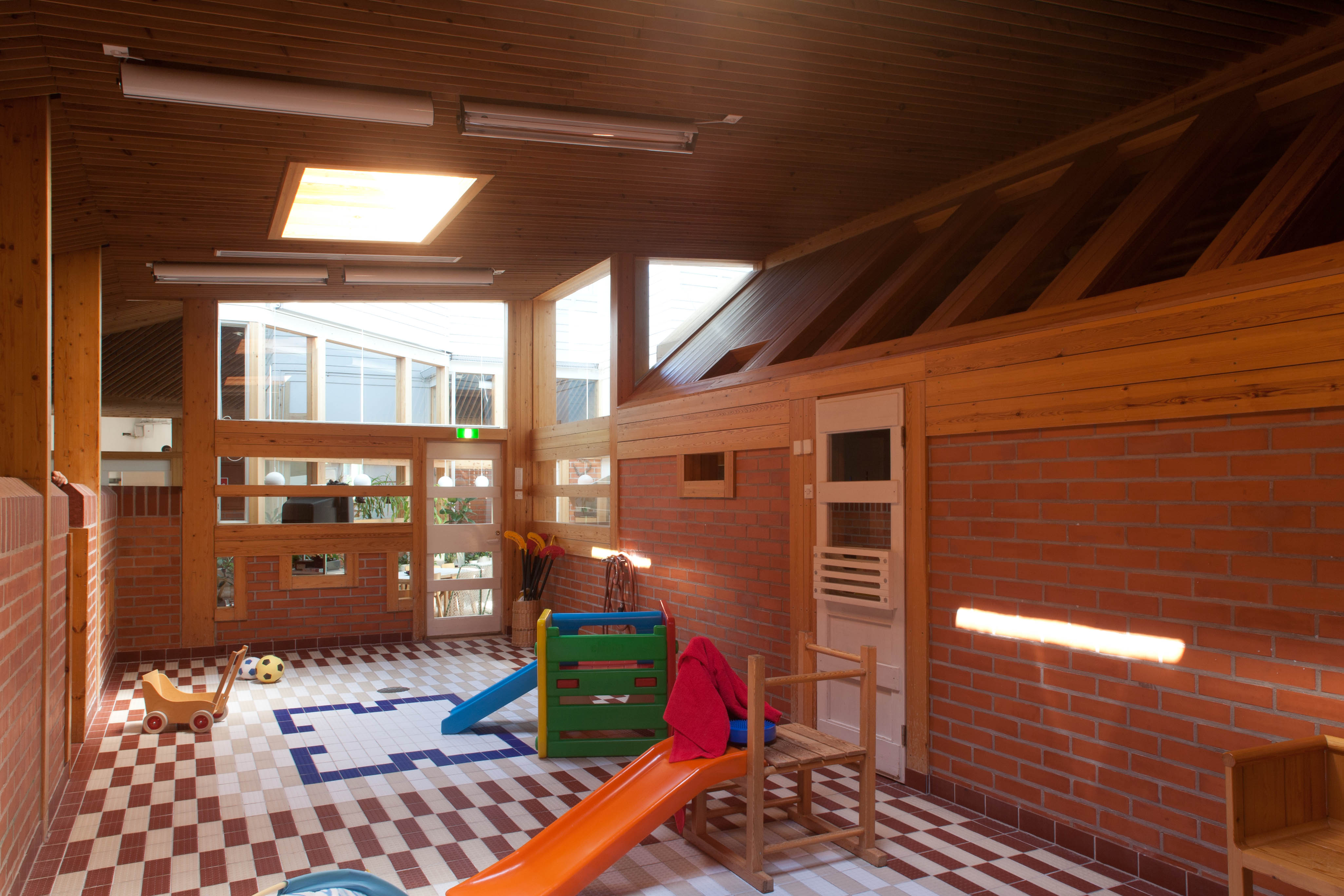
Interior of the Taikurinhattu kindergarten in Pori, Finland

At the end of the 1850s, Uno Cygnaeus, known as the "father of the Finnish primary school", presented the idea of bringing kindergartens to Finland after attending a kindergarten in Hamburg and a seminar training kindergarten teachers during his study trip to Central Europe. As early as 1920, there were about 80 kindergartens in operation across Finland, with a total of about 6,000 children.

Kindergarten activity emphasis and background communities vary. In Finland, most kindergartens are society's service to families while some are private. The underlying philosophy may be Montessori or Waldorf education. Preschools often also operate in connection with Finnish kindergartens. Kindergartens can also arrange language immersion programs in different languages. Finnish kindergartens now have an early childhood education plan, and parenting discussions are held with the parents of each child every year. Among OECD countries, Finland has higher-than-average public funding for early childhood education and the highest number of staff for children under the age of three: only four children per adult.

=== France ===
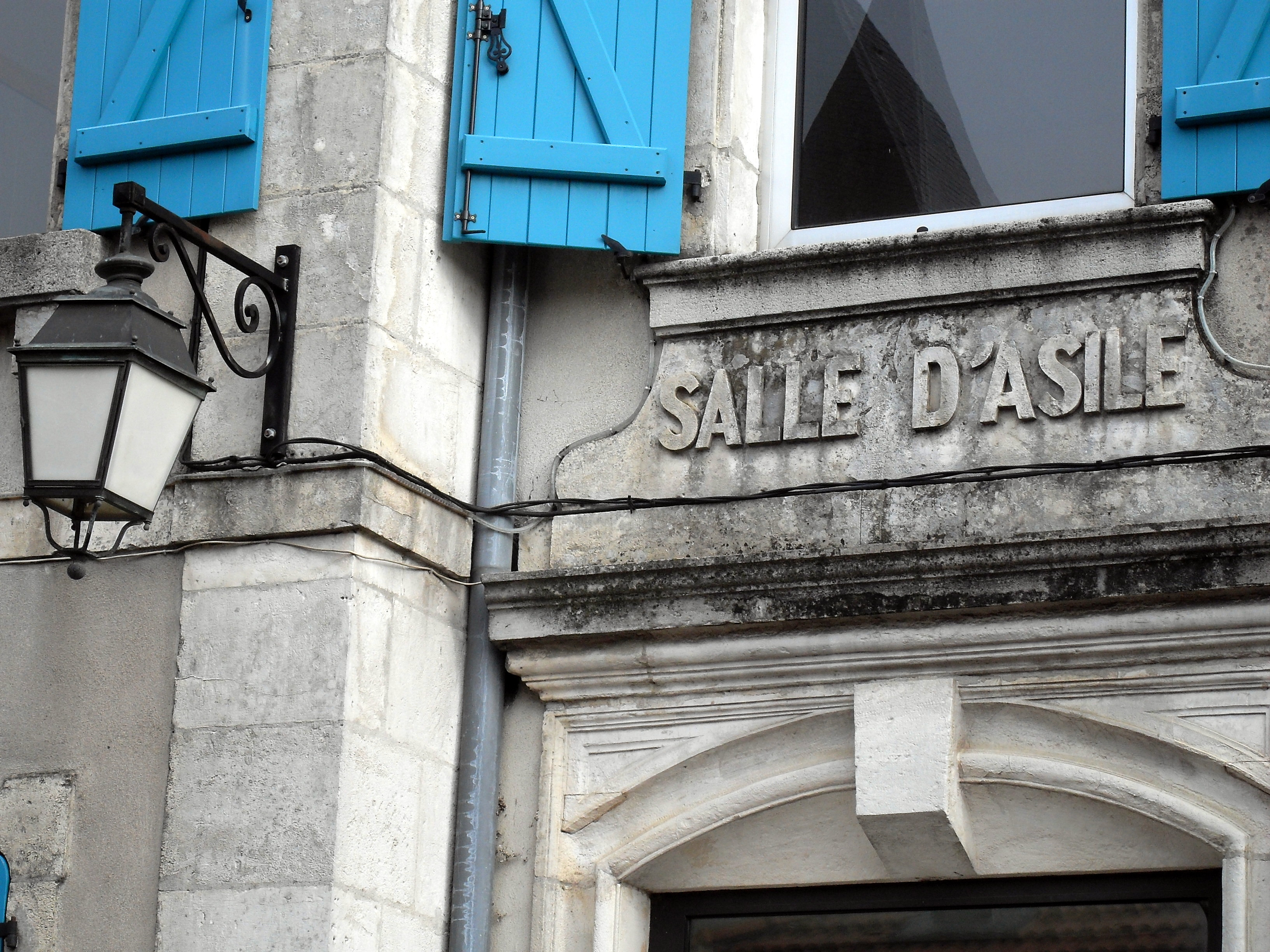
The wording salle d'asile was the former name of current école maternelle.

In France, preschool is known as école maternelle (French for "nursery school", literally "maternal school"). Free maternelle schools are available throughout the country, welcoming children aged from three to five (although in many places, children under three may not be granted a place). The ages are divided into grande section (GS: five-year-olds), moyenne section (MS: four-year-olds), petite section (PS: three-year-olds) and toute petite section (TPS: two-year-olds). It became compulsory in 2018 for all children aged three. Even before the 2018 law, almost all children aged three to five attended école maternelle. It is regulated by the Ministry of National Education.

=== Germany ===
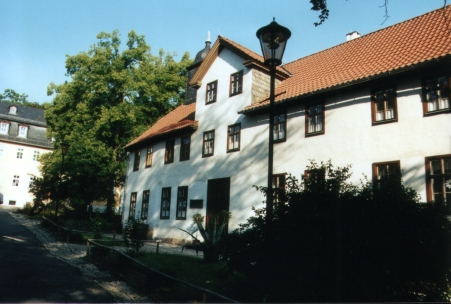
Allgemeine Deutsche Erziehungsanstalt in Keilhau (Germany), nowadays the Keilhau Free Fröbel School

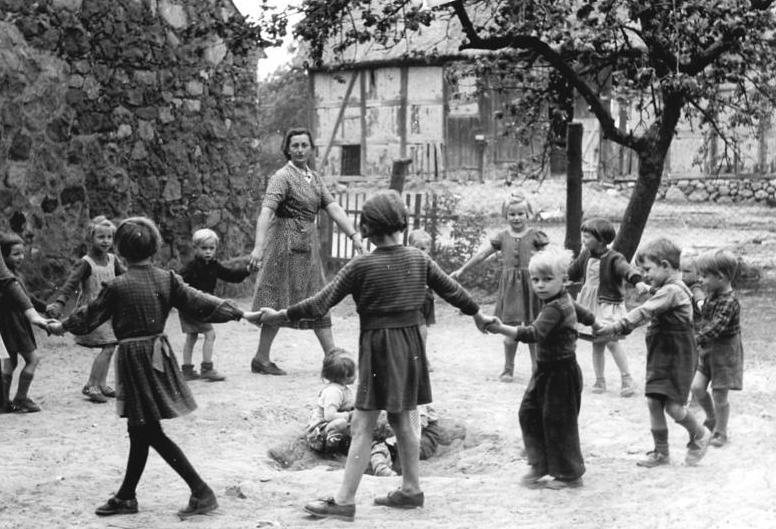
(East) German Kindergarten, 1956

In Germany, a Kindergarten (masculine: der Kindergarten, plural die Kindergärten) is a facility for the care of preschool children who are typically at least three years old. By contrast, Kinderkrippe or Krippe refers to a crèche for the care of children before they enter Kindergarten (nine weeks to about three years), while Kindertagesstätte—literally 'children's day site', usually shortened to Kita—is an umbrella term for any day care facility for preschoolers.

Attendance is voluntary, and usually not free of charge. Preschool children over the age of one are entitled to receive local and affordable day care. Within the federal system, Kindergärten fall under the responsibility of the states, which usually delegate a large share of the responsibility to the municipalities. Due to the subsidiarity principle stipulated by §4 SGB VIII, there are a multitude of operators, from municipalities, churches and welfare societies to parents' initiatives and profit-based corporations. Many Kindergärten follow a certain educational approach, such as Montessori, Reggio Emilia, "Berliner Bildungsprogramm" or Waldorf; forest kindergartens are well established. Most Kindergärten are subsidised by the community councils, with the fees depending on the income of the parents.

Even in smaller townships, there are often both Roman Catholic and Lutheran kindergartens available. Places in crèches and kindergarten are often difficult to secure and must be reserved in advance, although the situation has improved with a new law in effect August 2013. The availability of childcare, however, varies greatly by region. It is usually better in eastern regions, and in big cities in the north, such as Berlin or Hamburg, and poorest in parts of Southern Germany.

All caretakers in Kita or Kindergarten must have a three-year qualified education, or are under special supervision during training.

Kindergärten can be open from 7 a.m. to 5 p.m. or longer and may also house a crèche (Kinderkrippe) for children between the ages of eight weeks and three years, and possibly an afternoon Hort (often associated with a primary school) for school-age children aged six to ten who spend time after their lessons there. Alongside nurseries, there are day care nurses (Tagesmütter or Tagespflegepersonen) working independently of any preschool institution in individual homes and looking after only three to five children, typically up to the age of three. These nurses are supported and supervised by local authorities.

The term Vorschule ('preschool') is used both for educational efforts in Kindergärten and for a mandatory class that is usually connected to a primary school. Both systems are handled differently in each German state. The Schulkindergarten is a type of Vorschule.

=== Greece ===
In Greece, kindergarten is called nipiagogio (νηπιαγωγείο). Kindergarten is a form of preschool and may be referred to interchangeably as preschool.

=== Hong Kong ===
Pre-primary Services in Hong Kong refers to provision of education and care to young children by kindergartens and child care centres. Kindergartens, registered with the Education Bureau, provide services for children from three to six years old. Child care centres, on the other hand, are registered with the Social Welfare Department and include nurseries, catering for children aged two to three, and creches, looking after infants from birth to two.

At present, most of the kindergartens operate on a half-day basis offering upper and lower kindergarten and nursery classes. Some kindergartens also operate full-day kindergarten classes. Child care centres also provide full-day and half-day services with most centres providing full-day services.

The aim of pre-primary education in Hong Kong is to provide children with a relaxing and pleasurable learning environment to promote a balanced development of different aspects necessary to a child's development such as the physical, intellectual, language, social, emotional and aesthetic aspects.

To help establish the culture of self-evaluation in kindergartens and to provide reference for the public in assessing the quality and standard of pre-primary education, the Education Bureau has developed performance indicators for pre-primary institutions in Hong Kong. Commencing in the 2000–2001 school year, quality assurance inspection was launched to further promote the development of quality early childhood education.

=== Hungary ===
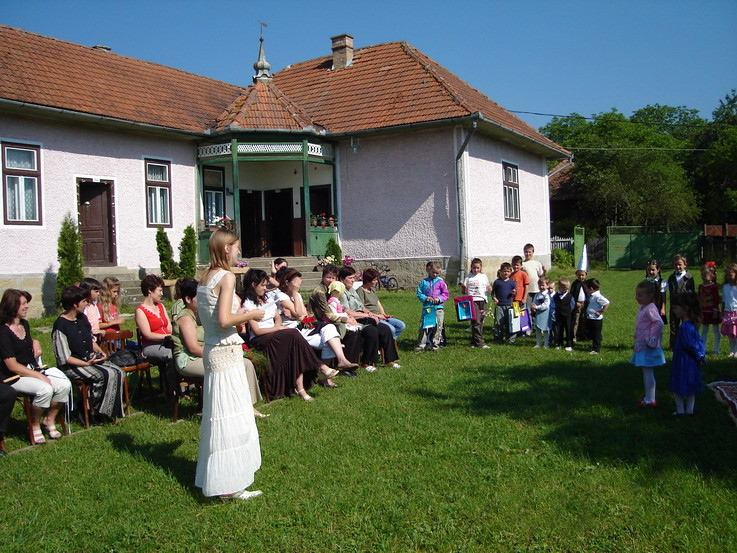
A Hungarian preschool class having outdoor activities, March 2007

In Hungary a kindergarten is called an óvoda ("protectory"). Children attend kindergarten between ages three and six or seven (they go to school in the year in which they have their seventh birthday). Attendance in kindergarten is compulsory from the age of three years, though exceptions are made for developmental reasons. Though kindergartens may include programs in subjects such as foreign language and music, children spend most of their time playing. In their last year, children begin preparation for elementary school.

Most kindergartens are state-funded. Kindergarten teachers are required to have a diploma.

=== India ===
In India, there are only informal directives pertaining to pre-primary education, for which pre-primary schools and sections need no affiliation. Directives state that children who are three years old on 30 September in the given academic year are eligible to attend nursery and kindergarten classes. Typically, children spend three to four years of their time in pre-primary school after which they are eligible to attend 1st standard in primary school which falls under HRD ministry norms. Pre-primary is not mandatory; however, it is preferred. All government schools and affiliated private schools allow children who are five years of age to enroll in standard 1 of a primary school. Mid-day meals are provided in most parts of the country and institutes run by the government.

=== Italy ===
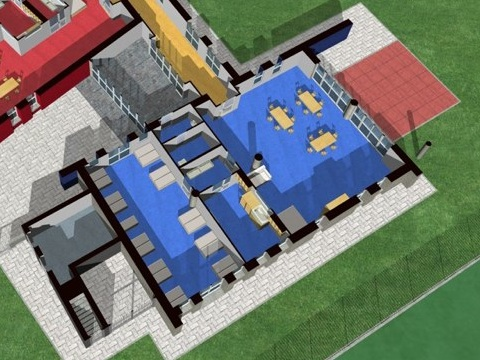
Typical classroom layout in an Italian nursery school. From left to right: restroom, bathroom, playroom, and outdoor playground.

In Italy, preschool education refers to two different grades:

- Nursery schools, called Asilo nido for children between three and thirty-six months;
- Maternal schools formerly scuola materna and now scuola dell'infanzia, for children three to five years old.

Italian asilo nido were officially instituted in a 1971 state law (L. 1044/1971), and may be run by either private or public institutions. They were originally established to allow mothers a chance to work outside of the home, and were therefore seen as a social service. Today, they mostly serve the purpose of general education and social interaction. In Italy, much effort has been spent on developing a pedagogical approach to children's care: well known is the so-called Reggio Emilia approach, named after the city of Reggio Emilia, in Emilia-Romagna.

Asilo nido normally occupy small one-story buildings, surrounded by gardens; usually suitable for no more than 60 or 70 children. The heart of the asilo nido are the classrooms, split into playroom and restroom; the playroom always has windows and doors leading to the outside playground and garden.

Maternal schools (scuola materna) were established in 1968 after State Law n. 444 and are a full part of the official Italian education system, though attendance is not compulsory. Like asilo nido (nursery schools), maternal schools may be held either by public or private institutions.

=== Japan ===
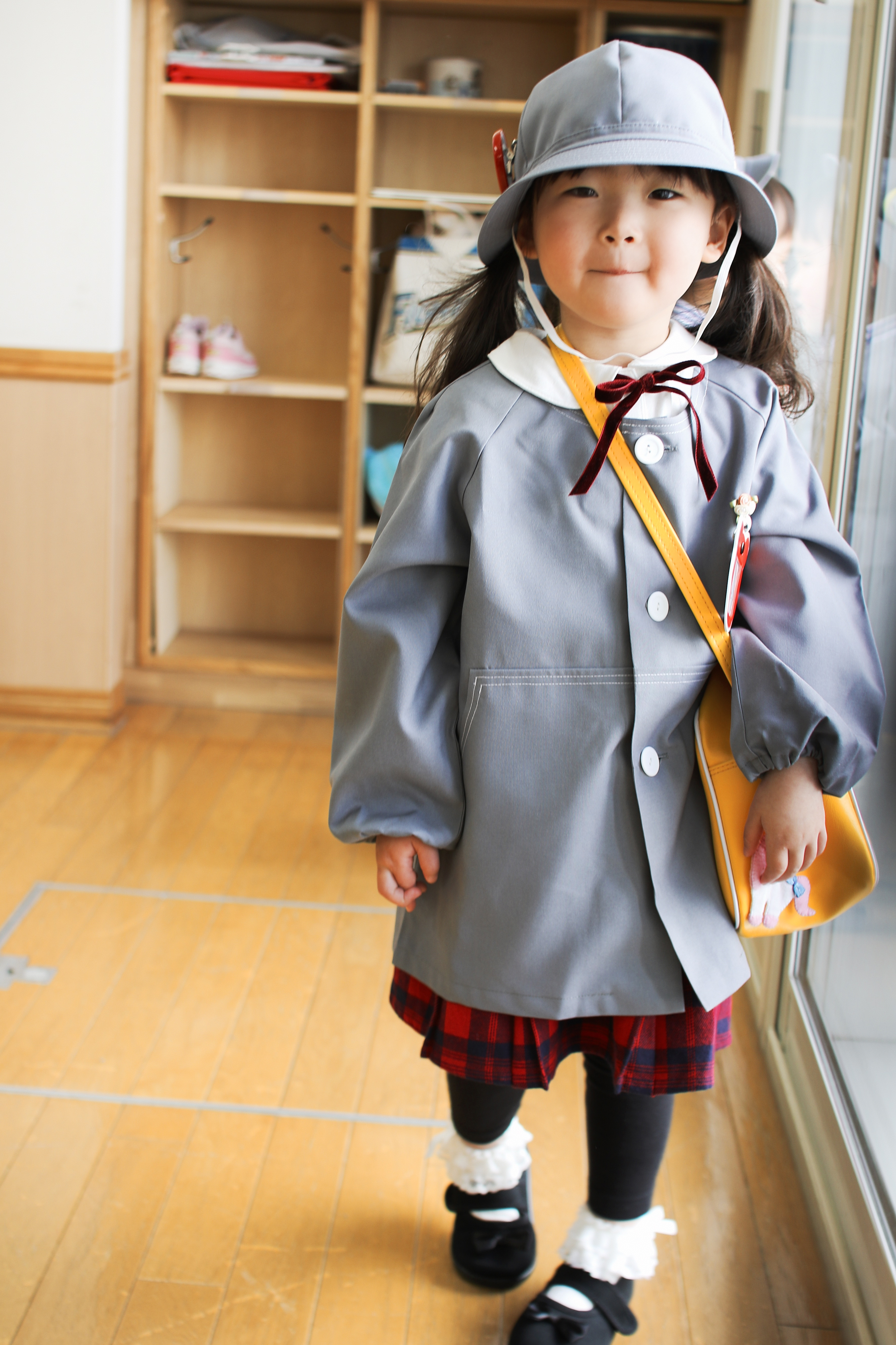
A girl at a Japanese kindergarten entrance ceremony

Early childhood education begins at home, and there are numerous books and television shows aimed at helping mothers and fathers of preschool children to educate their children and to parent more effectively. Much of the home training is devoted to teaching manners, social skills, and structured play, although verbal and number skills are also popular themes. Parents are strongly committed to early education and frequently enroll their children in preschools. Kindergartens (yōchien (幼稚園)), predominantly staffed by young female junior college graduates, are supervised by the Ministry of Education but are not part of the official education system. In addition to kindergartens, there exists a well-developed system of government-supervised nursery schools (hoikuen (保育園)), supervised by the Ministry of Labor. Whereas kindergartens follow educational aims, nursery schools are predominantly concerned with providing care for infants and toddlers. Together, these two kinds of institutions enroll 86% at age three and 99% at age five prior to their entrance into the formal system at first grade. The Ministry of Education's 1990 Course of Study for Preschools, which applies to both kinds of institutions, covers such areas as human relationships, health, environment, language, and expression. Starting from March 2008 the new revision of curriculum guidelines for kindergartens as well as for preschools came into effect.

=== North Korea ===
North Korean children attend kindergarten from four to six. Kindergartens have two sections; low class (Korean: 낮은반, romanized: nadŭnban) and high class (Korean: 높은반, romanized: nopŭnban). High class is compulsory.

=== South Korea ===
In South Korea, children normally attend kindergarten (Korean: 유치원, romanized: yuchi won) between the ages of three or four and six or seven in the Western age system. (Korean ages are calculated differently from Western ages: one is considered one year old from birth. Additionally, one's age increases by one year on January 1 regardless of when their birthday is. Hence in Korea, kindergarten children are called five-, six- and seven-year-olds). The school year begins in March. It is followed by primary school. Normally the kindergartens are graded on a three-tier basis.

Korean kindergartens are National and public(free education and excellent facilities) or private schools, and monthly costs vary. Korean parents often send their children to English kindergartens(academy) to give them a head start in English. Such specialized kindergartens(academy) can be mostly taught in Korean with some English lessons, mostly taught in English with some Korean lessons, or completely taught in English. Almost all Korean parents send their children to kindergarten.

Kindergarten programs in South Korea attempt to incorporate much academic instruction alongside more playful activities. Korean private kindergartners learn to read, write (often in English as well as Korean) and do simple arithmetic. Classes are conducted in a traditional classroom setting, with the children focused on the teacher and one lesson or activity at a time. The goal of the teacher is to overcome weak points in each child's knowledge or skills.

Because the education system in Korea is very competitive, private kindergartens are becoming more intensely academic. Children are pushed to read and write at a very young age. They also become accustomed to regular and considerable amounts of homework. Very young children may also attend other specialized afternoon schools, taking lessons in art, piano or violin, taekwondo, ballet, soccer or mathematics.

=== Kuwait ===
In Kuwait, Kuwaiti children may go to free government kindergartens for two years (KG1 and KG2) between the ages of four and five.

=== Luxembourg ===
In Luxembourg, kindergarten is called Spillschoul (literally 'playschool', plural Spillschoulen). It is a public education facility which is attended by children between the age of four (or five) and six, when they advance to Grondschoul (elementary school).

=== Malaysia ===
In Malaysia, kindergarten is known as tadika. Most kindergartens are available to children of ages five and six (and some are available to children as young as four). For children up to the age of three (or four), there are preschool playgroups. There are no fixed rules for when a child needs to go to a kindergarten, but the majority do at five years of age. The child will usually attend kindergarten for two years, before proceeding to primary school at age seven.

=== Mexico ===
In Mexico, kindergarten is called kínder, with the last year sometimes referred to as preprimaria (primaria is the name given to grades 1 through 6, so the name literally means 'prior to elementary school'). The kindergarten system in Mexico was developed by professor Rosaura Zapata, who received the country's highest honor for her contribution. It consists of three years of preschool education, which are mandatory before elementary school. Previous nursery is optional and may be offered in either private schools or public schools.

At private schools, kínders usually consist of three grades, and a fourth may be added for nursery. The fourth one is called maternal; it comes prior to the other three years and is not obligatory. While the first grade is a playgroup, the other two are classroom education.

In 2002, the Congress of the Union approved the Law of Obligatory Pre-schooling, which made preschool education for three to six-year-olds obligatory, and placed it under the auspices of the federal and state ministries of education.

=== Mongolia ===
In Mongolia, kindergarten is known as цэцэрлэг or tsetserleg. As of September 2013, there are approximately 152 kindergartens registered in the country. From those 152 kindergartens, 142 are state-owned. Children begin kindergarten at the age of two and finish it by five. The education system before kindergarten in Mongolia is called ясль, which accepts children between zero and two years of age.

=== Morocco ===
In Morocco, preschool is known as école maternelle, kuttab, or ar-rawd. State-run, free maternelle schools are available throughout the kingdom, welcoming children aged two to five (although in many places, children under three may not be granted a place). It is not compulsory, yet almost 80% of children aged three to five attend. It is regulated by the Moroccan Department of Education.

=== Nepal ===
In Nepal, kindergartens are run as private institutions, with their lessons conducted in English. The kindergarten education in Nepal is most similar to that of Hong Kong and India. Children start attending kindergarten from the age of two until they are at least five years old.

The kindergartens in Nepal have the following grades:

1. Nursery/playgroup: two- to three-year-olds
2. Lower kindergarten: three- to four-year-olds
3. Upper kindergarten: four- to five-year-olds

=== Netherlands ===
In the Netherlands, the equivalent term to kindergarten was kleuterschool. From the mid-19th century to the mid-20th century the term Fröbelschool was also common, after Friedrich Fröbel. However, this term gradually faded in use as the verb Fröbelen gained a slightly derogatory meaning in everyday language. Until 1985, it used to be a separate non-compulsory form of education (for children aged four to six years), after which children (aged six to twelve years) attended primary school (lagere school). After 1985, both forms were integrated into one, called basisonderwijs 'primary education'. For children under four, the country offers private, subsidized day care (kinderdagverblijf), which is non-compulsory but nevertheless very popular.

=== New Zealand ===
In New Zealand, kindergarten, commonly known as kindy, serves as preparation for primary education. Kindergartens in the country cater to children between two and five years old, offering various session options such as morning, afternoon, and full-day programs. The availability of these sessions depends on the capabilities of the specific center and the child's age. Typically, a full day at a kindergarten in New Zealand runs from 8:45 am to 3 pm.

=== North Macedonia ===
The Macedonian equivalent of kindergarten is detska gradinka (детска градинка), sometimes called zabavishte (забавиште) when the children are younger than four. Detska gradinka is not part of the state's mandatory education because the educational process in the country begins at the age of five or six, i.e. first grade.

=== Norway ===
In Norway, barnehage 'children's garden' is the term equivalent to kindergarten, used for children in the ages between ten months and six years. The first barnehager were founded in Norway in the late 19th century. Although they have existed for 120 years, they are not considered part of the education system. They are both publicly and privately owned and operated. The staff, at minimum the manager, should be educated as barnehagelærer 'kindergarten teacher', previously known as førskolelærer 'preschool teachers'. Children younger than three are often kept separate from the older children, since the youngest are only expected to play, rest and eat. All the children spend time outdoors every day. Many barnehager let the children sleep outdoors too. There is also an institution called barnepark 'children's park', which does not need to have certified staff.

=== Peru ===
In Peru, the term nido refers to the schooling children attend from three to six years of age. It is followed by primary school classes, which last for six years. Some families choose to send their children to primary school at the age of six. In 1902 the teacher Elvira García y García organized the first kindergarten for children two to eight years old, Fanning annex to the Lyceum for ladies. Her studies and concern for children led her to spread, through conferences and numerous documents, the importance of protecting children early and to respond to the formation of a personality based on justice and understanding, as well as the use of Fröbel's and Montessori's methods and parental participation.

=== Philippines ===
Early childhood education in the Philippines is mandatory, and is classified into:

- Center-based programs, such as the Barangay day care service, public and private preschools, kindergarten or school-based programs, community or church-based early childhood education programs initiated by non-government organizations or people's organizations, workplace-related child care and education programs, child-minding centers, health centers and stations; and
- Home-based programs, such as neighborhood-based playgroups, family day care programs, parent education and home visiting programs.

Early childhood education was strengthened through the creation of the Early Childhood Care and Development Act of 2000 (Republic Act No. 8980). In 2011, the Department of Education disseminated copies of the Kindergarten Education Act through Republic Act No. 10157 making it compulsory and mandatory in the entire nation. As a provision in this law, children under five years old are required to enroll in a kindergarten in any public elementary school in the country. Education officially started at the elementary level, and placing children into early childhood education through kindergarten was optional until June 6, 2011, when Kindergarten became compulsory which served as a requirement for the implementation of the K–12 curriculum and process of phasing out the 1945–2017 K–10 educational system on April 24, 2012, as part of the K–12's 9-year implementation process.

=== Poland ===
In Poland, Przedszkole (literally 'preschool'), is a preschool educational institution for children aged from three to six, mandatory for children aged six (this class is also commonly referred to as Zerówka or 'Class 0'), and optional for those aged seven whose parents submitted an application for the postponement of primary school.

=== Romania ===
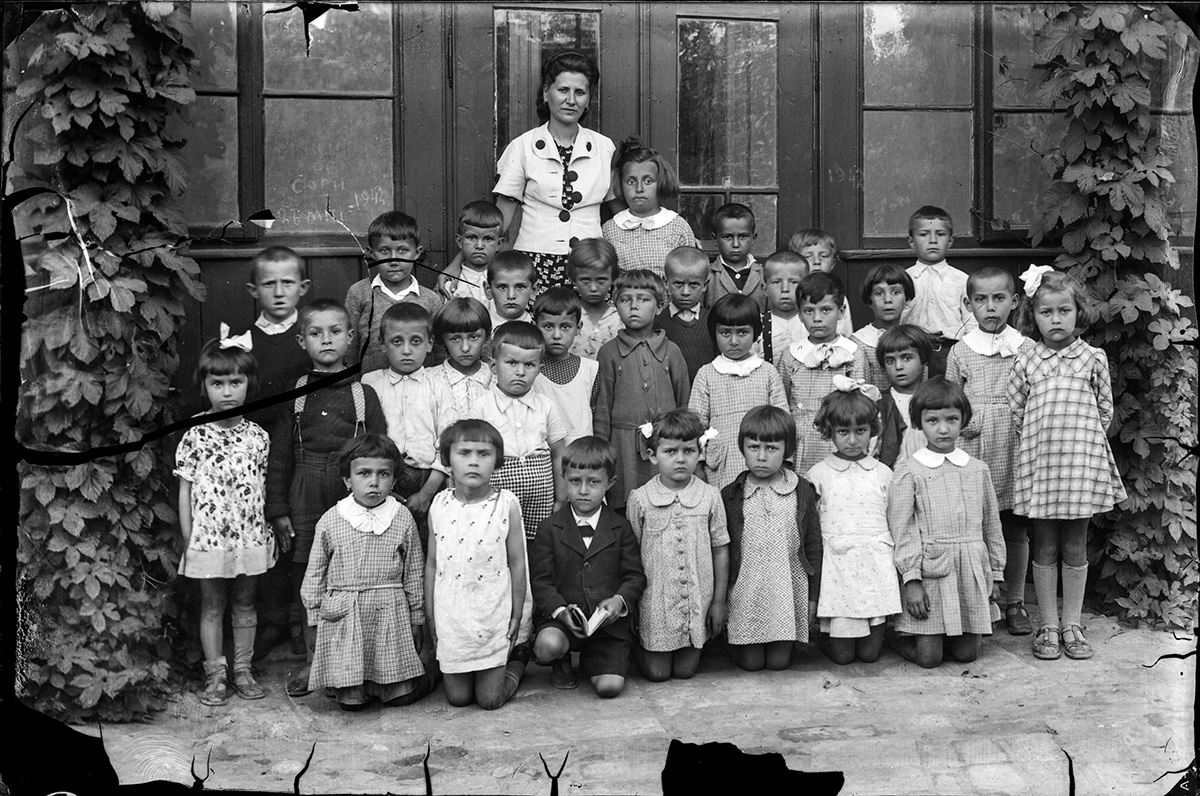
Kindergarten children in 1942 in Slobozia, Romania

In Romania, grădiniță (literally 'small garden') is the favored form of education for preschool children usually aged three to six. The children are divided into three age groups: 'little group' (grupa mică, age three–four), 'medium group' (grupa mijlocie, age four–five) and 'big group' (grupa mare, age five–six). In the last few years private kindergartens have become popular, supplementing the state preschool education system. Attending the last year of kindergarten is compulsory since 2020.

The 'preparatory school year' (clasa pregătitoare) is for children aged six–seven, and since it became compulsory in 2012, it usually takes place inside regular school classrooms and is considered "year 0" of elementary education, bridging the gap between kindergarten and years 1–4 of elementary school.

=== Russia ===
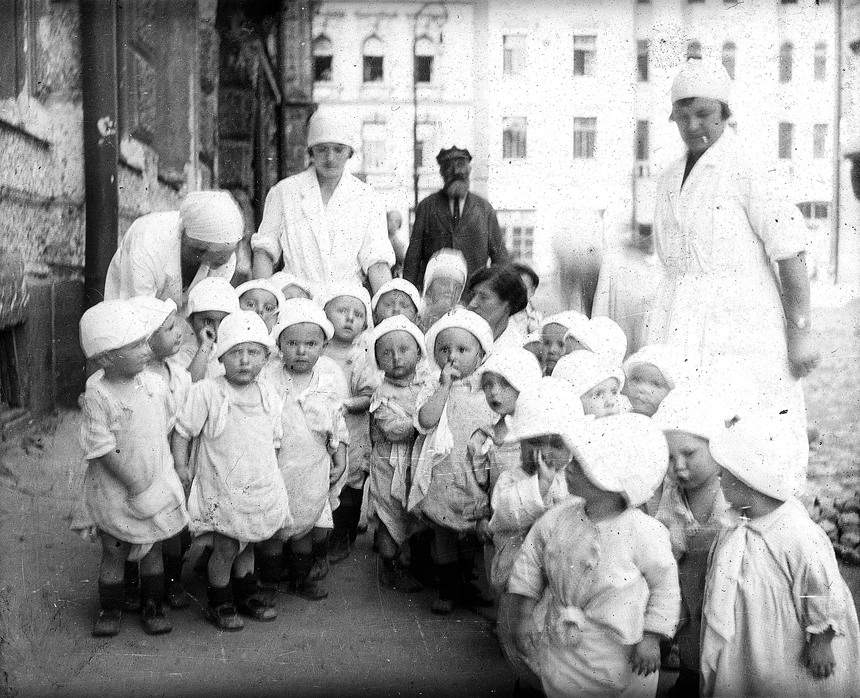
Children of a kindergarten on a walk, Leningrad, Soviet Union, 1930s

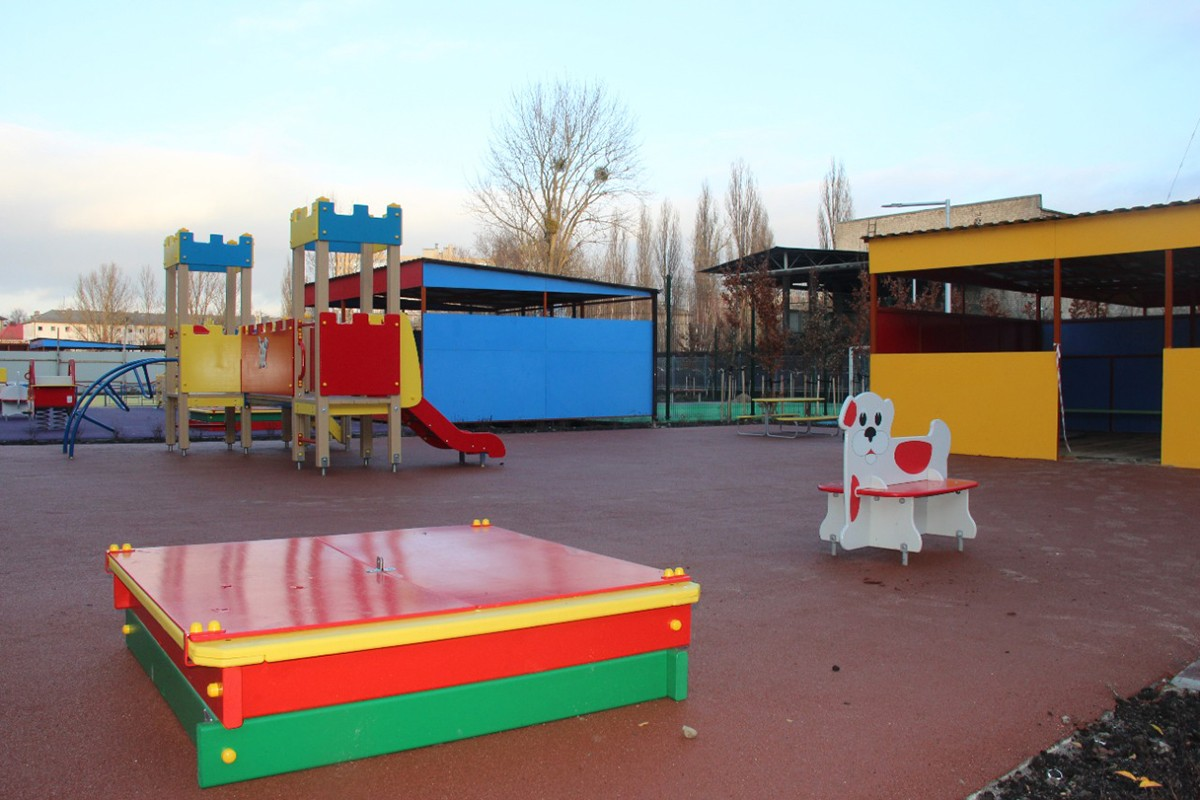
A playground at a kindergarten. Kaliningrad Oblast, Russia

In the Russian Federation, Детский сад (dyetskiy sad, literal translation of 'children's garden') is a preschool educational institution for children, usually three to six years of age.

=== Singapore ===
Kindergartens in Singapore provide up to three years of preschool for children ages three to six. The three years are commonly called nursery, kindergarten 1 (K1) and kindergarten 2 (K2), respectively.

The Ministry of Education runs several MOE Kindergartens at highly subsidized fees for K1 and K2 students. Many other kindergartens and nurseries are managed by the private entities, including the PAP Community Foundation which has over 370 kindergartens Other kindergartens are run by religious bodies, civic or business groups.

=== South Africa ===
Kindergartens (commonly known as creche) in South Africa provide preschool programs for children of all ages up to six. The one to three-year program, known as nursery, kindergarten 1 (K1), and kindergarten 2 (K2), prepares children for their first year in primary school education. Some kindergartens further divide nursery into N1 and N2.

=== Spain ===
In Spain, kindergarten is called Infantil or Educación Infantil and covers ages three to six, the three courses being called, respectively, P-3, P-4 and P-5. Though non-mandatory, most children in Spain attend these courses.

Before that, children aged zero to three may attend the escuela infantil and take courses P-0, P-1 and P-2. In most parts of Spain escuelas infantiles are specialized schools completely separate from regular schools.

=== Sudan ===
Kindergarten in Sudan is divided into private and public kindergarten. Preschool is compulsory in Sudan. Kindergarten age spans from three–six years. The curriculum covers Arabic, English, religion, mathematics and more.

=== Sweden ===
In Sweden, kindergarten activities were established in the 19th century, and have been widely expanded since the 1970s. The first Swedish kindergarten teachers were trained by Henriette Schrader-Breymann at the Pestalozzi-Fröbel Haus, which she founded in 1882. Today Kindergarten education is offered through Förskolor.

=== Taiwan ===
While many public kindergartens and preschools exist in Taiwan, private kindergartens and preschools are also quite popular. Many private preschools offer accelerated courses in various subjects to compete with public preschools and capitalize on public demand for academic achievement. The curriculum at such preschools often encompasses subject material such as science, art, physical education and even mathematics classes. The majority of these schools are part of large school chains, which operate under franchise arrangements. In return for annual fees, the chain enterprises may supply advertising, curriculum, books, materials, training, and even staff for each individual school.

There has been a huge growth in the number of privately owned and operated English immersion preschools in Taiwan since 1999. These English immersion preschools generally employ native English-speaking teachers to teach the whole preschool curriculum in an English only environment. The legality of these types of schools has been called into question on many occasions, yet they continue to prosper. Some members of Taiwanese society have raised concerns as to whether local children should be placed in English immersion environments at such a young age, and have raised fears that the students' abilities in their mother language may suffer as a result. The debate continues, but at the present time, the market for English immersion preschools continues to grow.

=== Uganda ===
In Uganda, kindergarten is nursery or pre-primary and usually covers ages three to five, the three classes called baby class, middle class and top class, respectively. Pupils graduating from top class then go on to enrol in P1 – the first year of primary school. Though non-mandatory, most children in Uganda today attend these classes. In most parts of Uganda, nursery schools are specialised schools completely separate from regular primary schools.

=== Ukraine ===
In 2010, a total of 56% of children aged one to six years old had the opportunity to attend preschool education, the Education and Science Ministry of Ukraine reported in August 2010. Many preschools and kindergartens were closed previously in light of economic and demographic considerations.

=== United Kingdom ===
The term kindergarten is rarely used in the UK to describe modern preschool education or the first years of compulsory primary school education. Preschools are usually known as nursery schools or nursery classes within a primary school (occasionally creches or playgroups), with private nurseries offering childcare for babies and children up to age four, while the first year of schooling is known as Reception in England and Wales, beginning in the school year a child turns 5 (in practice meaning most start school aged 4) and Primary One in Scotland and Northern Ireland (though different terms may be used in the small minority of UK schools which teach primarily through the medium of a language other than English). Nursery forms part of the Foundation Stage of education. In the 1980s, England and Wales officially adopted the Northern Irish system whereby children start school either in the term or year in which they will become five depending on the policy of the local education authority. In England, schooling is not compulsory until a child's fifth birthday but in practice most children join school in the Reception year the September before their fifth birthday at the age of 4. In Scotland, schooling becomes compulsory between the ages of four-and-a-half and five-and-a-half years depending on their birthday (school starts in August for children who were four by the end of the preceding February).

However, the word kindergarten is used for more specialist organisations such as forest kindergartens and is sometimes used in the naming of private nurseries that provide full-day child care for working parents. Historically the word was used during the nineteenth century when activists like Emily Ronalds and later Adelaide Manning were introducing educators to the work of Friedrich Fröbel.

In the UK, parents have the option of nursery for their children at the ages of three or four years, before compulsory education begins. Before that, less structured childcare is available privately. The details vary between England, Northern Ireland, Scotland and Wales.

Some nurseries are attached to state infant or primary schools, but many are provided by the private sector. The Scottish government provides funding so that all children from the age of three until they start compulsory school can attend five sessions per week of two and a half hours each, either in state-run or private nurseries. Working parents can also receive from their employers childcare worth £55 per week free of income tax, which is typically enough to pay for one or two days per week.

==== England ====
Every child in England at the first school term after their third birthday is entitled to 15 hours per week free childcare funding. Pre-schools in England follow the Early Learning Goals, set by the Early Years Foundation Stage, for education produced by the Department for Education, which carries on into their first year of school at the age of four. This year of school is usually called Reception. The Early Learning Goals cover the main areas of education without being subject driven. These areas include:

The three prime areas:

- communication and language
- physical development
- personal, social and emotional development

The four specific areas:

- literacy
- mathematics
- understanding the world
- expressive arts and design

Pupils attend nursery school for four or five terms. It is also common practice for many children to attend nursery much earlier than this. Many nurseries have the facilities to take on babies, using the 'Early Years Foundation Stage' framework as a guide to give each child the best possible start to becoming a competent learner and skilful communicator. Nurseries and playgroups are inspected and regulated by Her Majesty's Inspectors (Office for Standards in Education).

==== Scotland ====
The Scottish government defines its requirements for nursery schools in the Early Years Framework and the Curriculum for Excellence. Each school interprets these with more or less independence (depending on their management structure) but must satisfy the Care Inspectorate in order to retain their licence to operate. The curriculum aims to develop:

- confident individuals
- effective contributors
- responsible citizens
- successful learners

=== United States ===
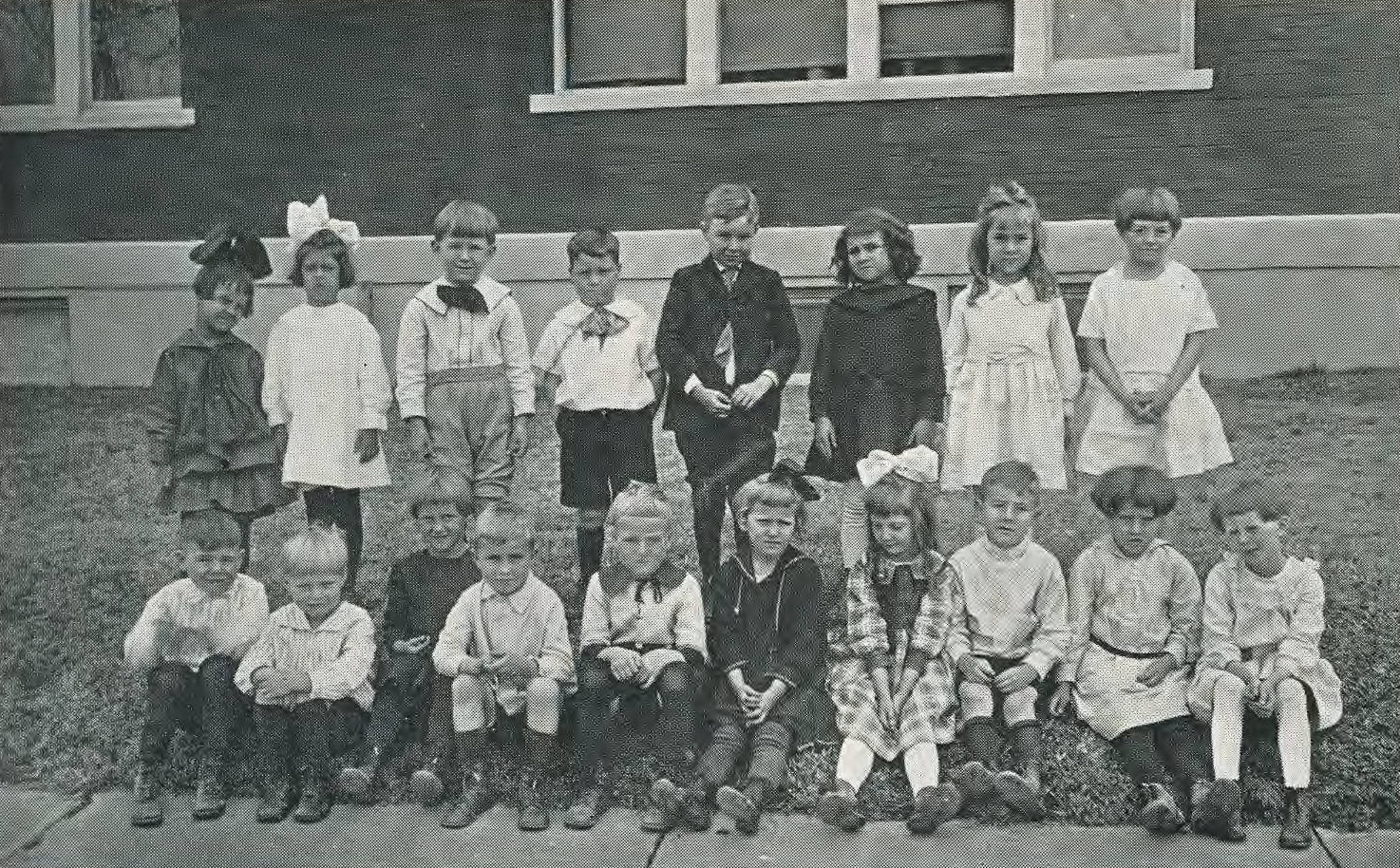
1921 kindergarten class at the East Texas State Normal College Training School

In the United States, kindergarten is usually part of the K–12 educational system, but attendance is not compulsory across the country; each state determines whether or not kindergarten is compulsory. Forty-three of the fifty states (the exceptions being Alaska, Idaho, Minnesota, Michigan, New Hampshire, New York, and Pennsylvania) require school districts to offer a kindergarten year, either for a full-day or a half-day.

In most schools, children begin kindergarten at age five for one year. Students develop skills such as numeracy, literacy, and a greater awareness of the world around them geographically, scientifically, socially, and culturally.

== See also ==
- Forest kindergarten
- Head Start Program
- Kitafahrten
- Montessori education
- Pre-math skills
- Reggio Emilia approach
- Universal preschool
- Waldorf education
