= Neighborhoods in New York City =

The five boroughs: 1: Manhattan, 2: Brooklyn, 3: Queens, 4: The Bronx, 5: Staten Island

The neighborhoods in New York City are located within the five boroughs of the City of New York. Their names and borders are not officially defined, and they change from time to time.

== Boroughs ==
New York City is split up into five boroughs: the Bronx, Brooklyn, Manhattan, Queens, and Staten Island. Each borough has the same boundaries as a county of the state. The county governments were dissolved when the city consolidated in 1898, along with all city, town, and village governments within each county. The term borough was adopted to describe a unique form of governmental administration for each of the five fundamental constituent parts of the newly consolidated city.

== Neighborhoods by borough ==
- List of Bronx neighborhoods
- List of Brooklyn neighborhoods
- List of Manhattan neighborhoods
- List of Queens neighborhoods
- List of Staten Island neighborhoods

== Community areas ==
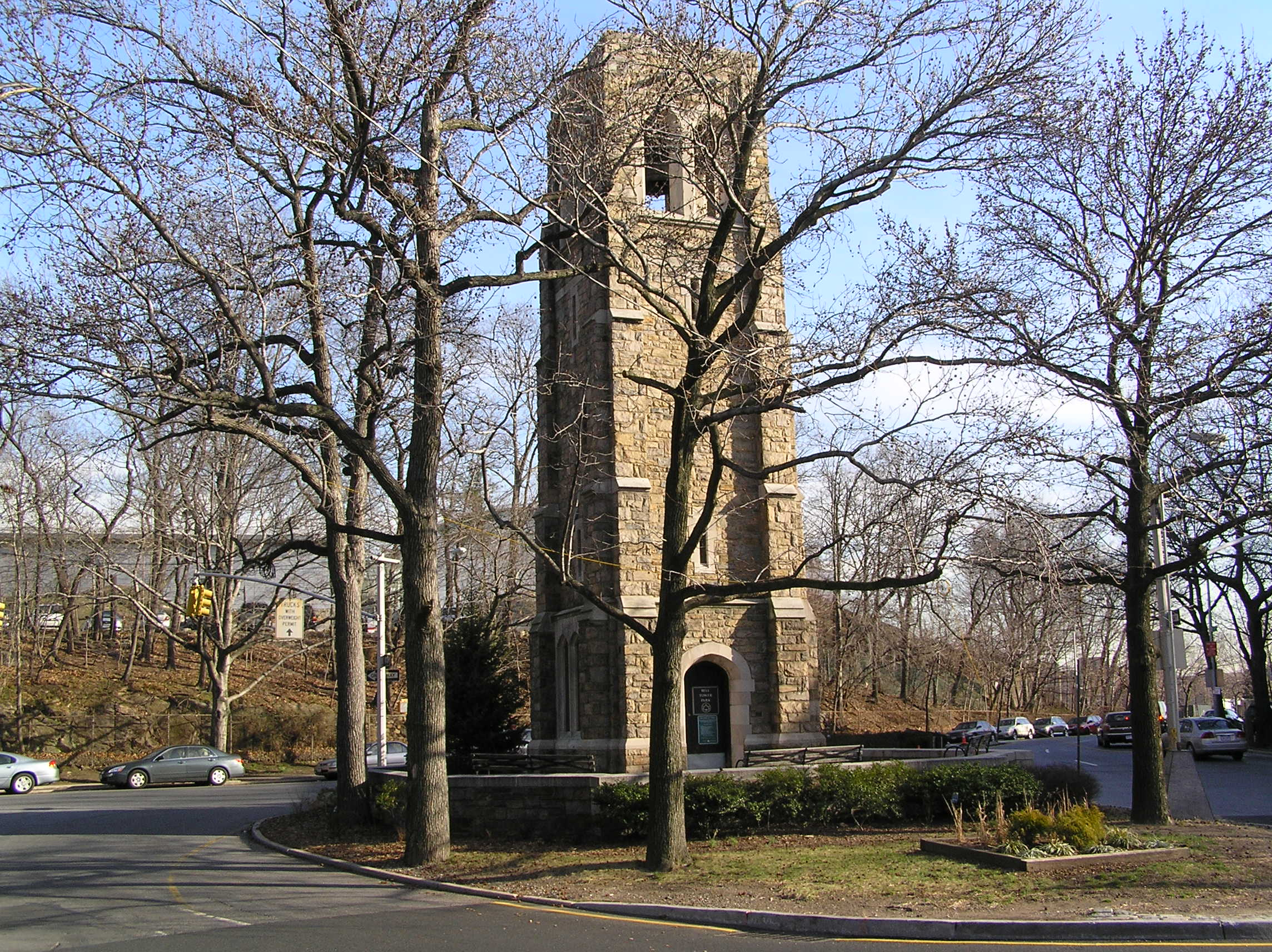
Riverdale, Bronx

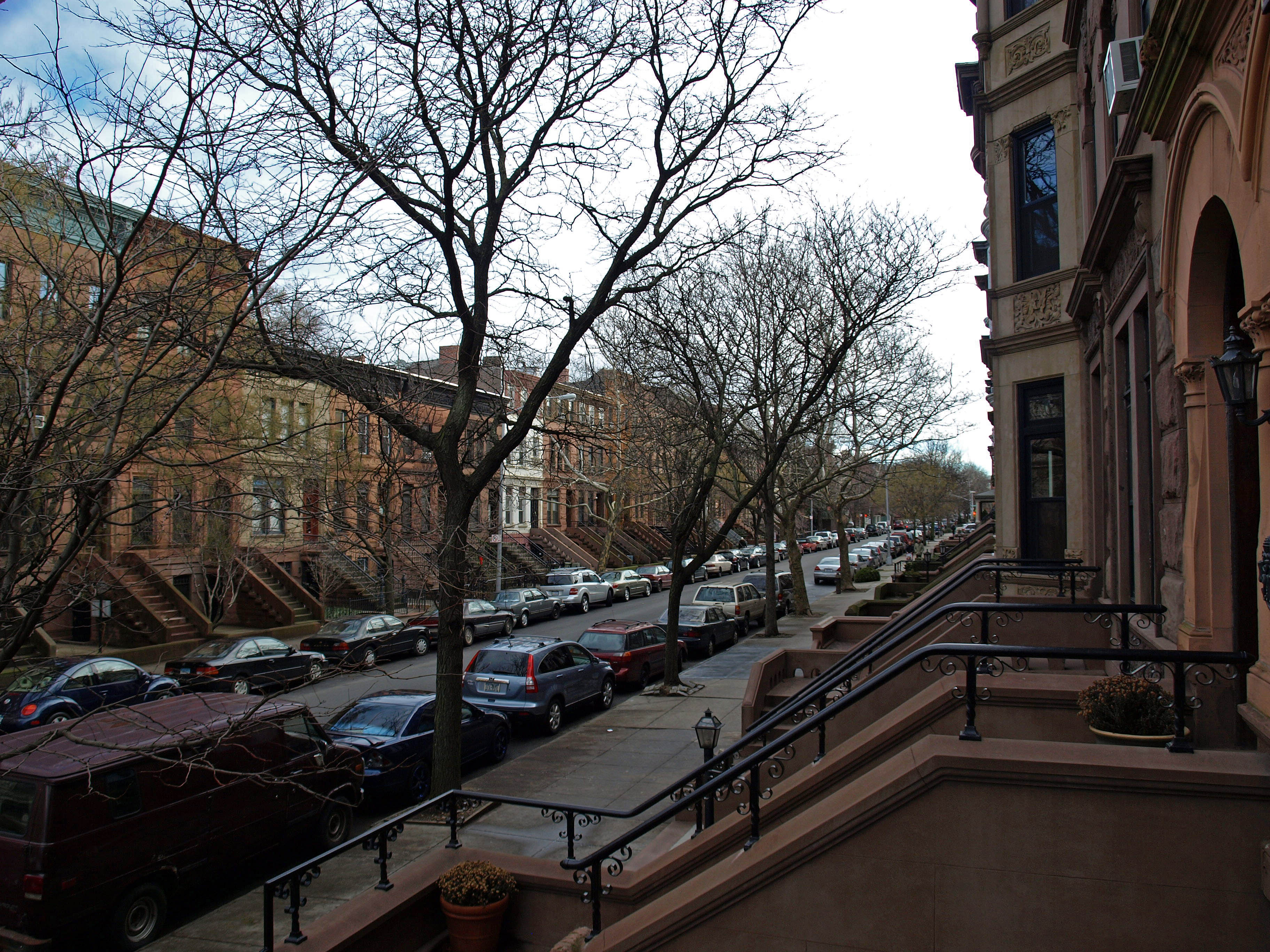
Prospect Heights, Brooklyn

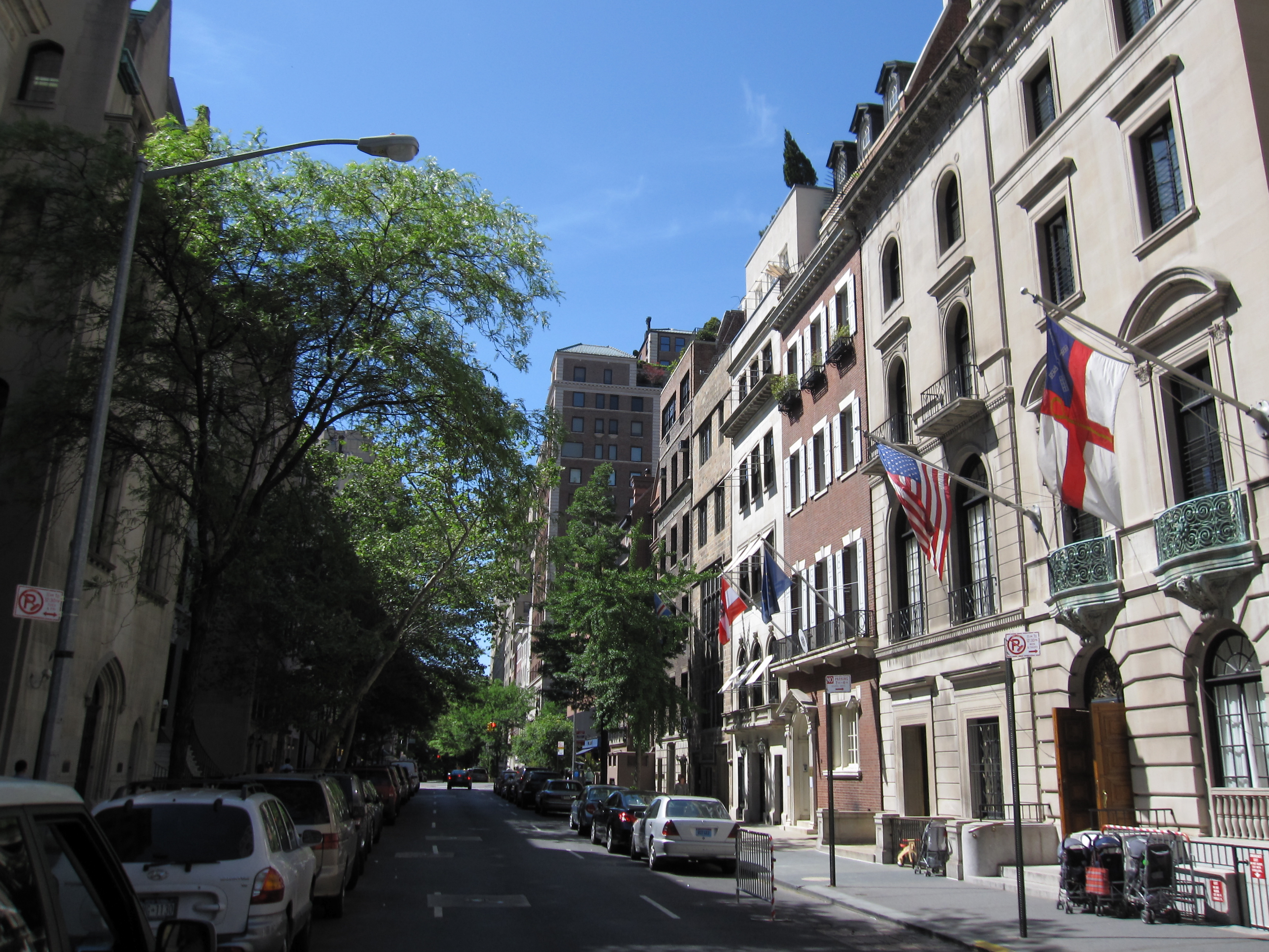
Upper East Side, Manhattan

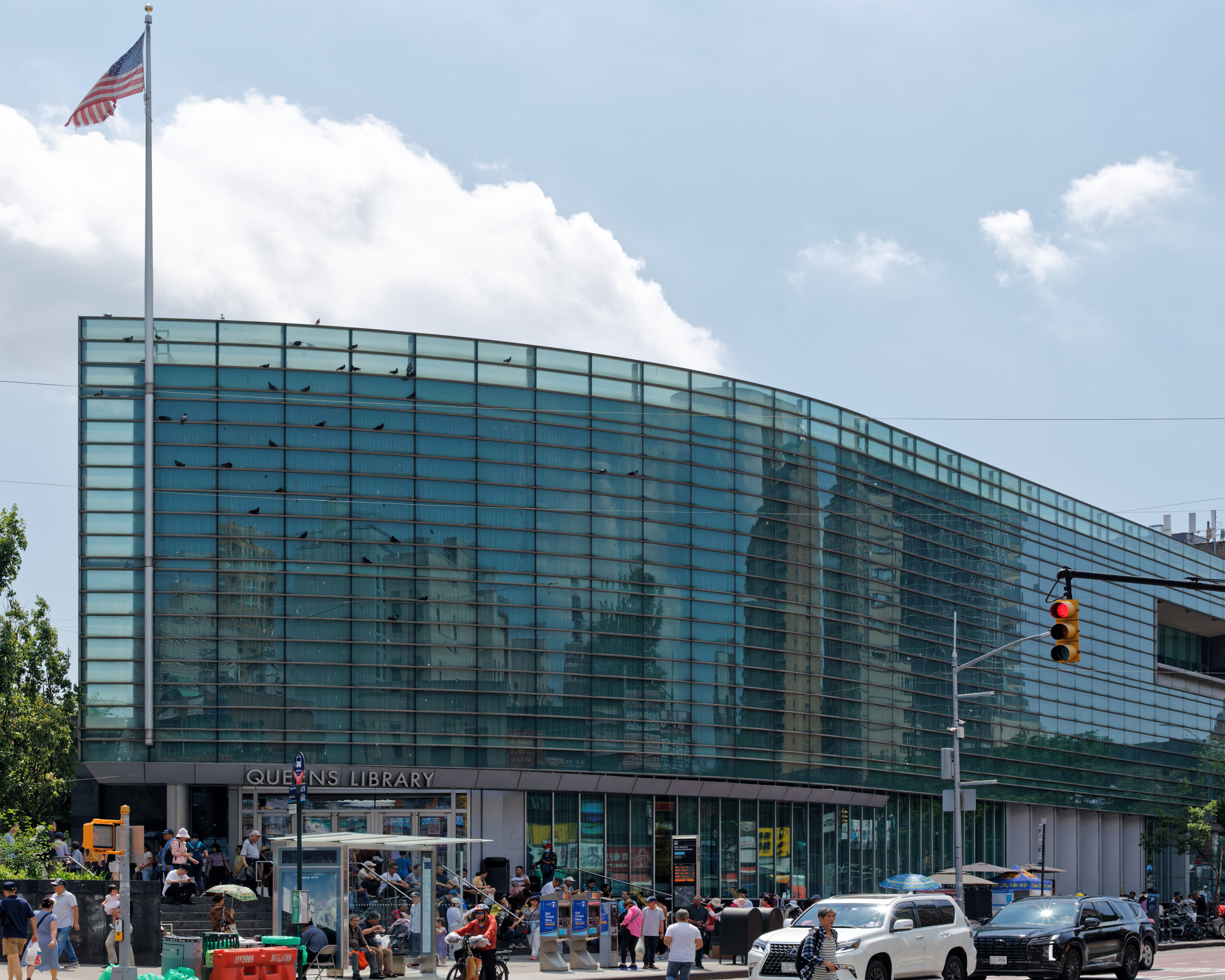
Flushing, Queens

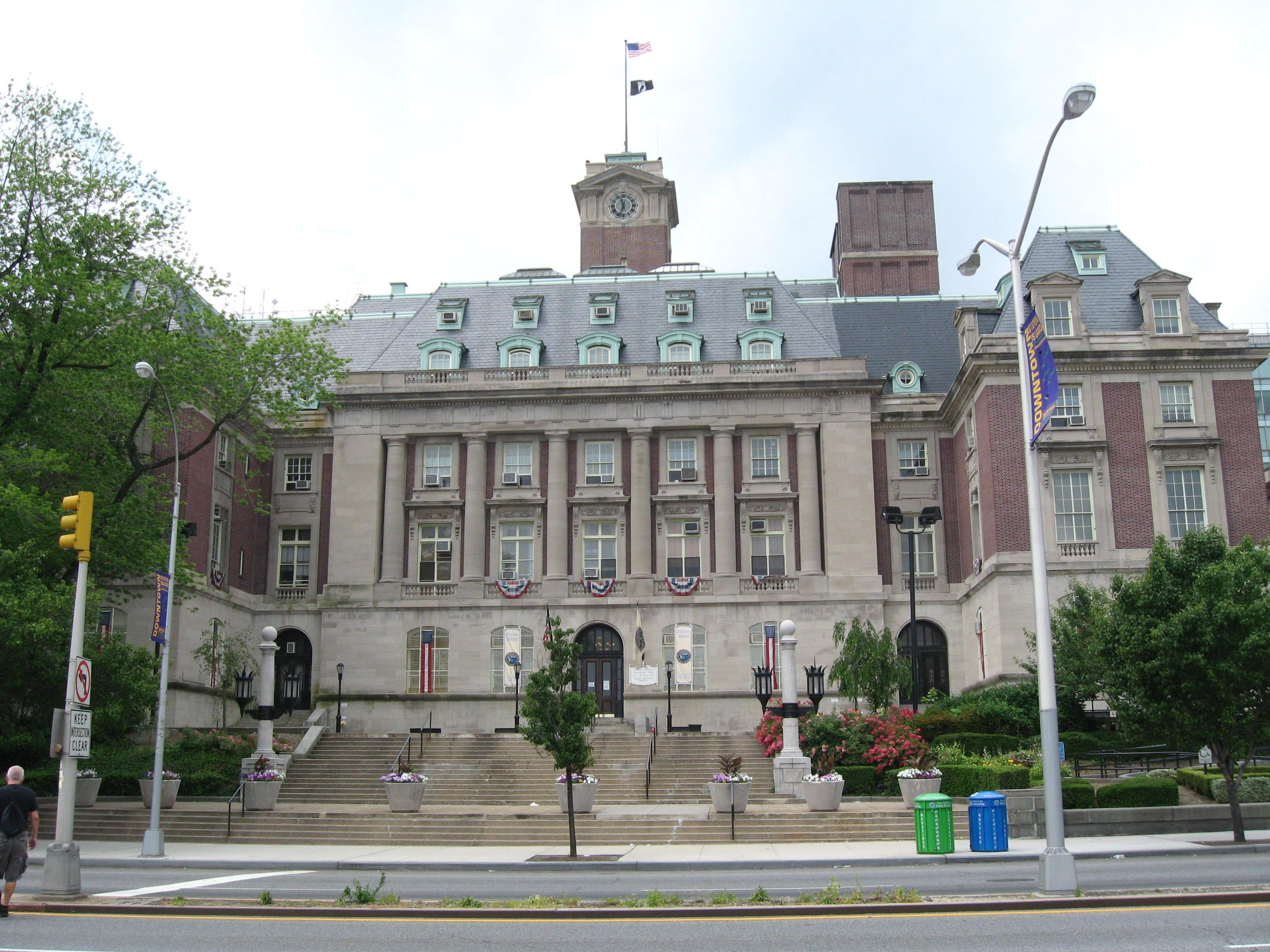
St. George, Staten Island

Community Boards in New York City
Community Board (CB)	Area km^{2}	Pop. Census 2020	Pop./ km^{2}	Neighborhoods
Bronx CB 1	7.17	100,929	14,077	Melrose, Mott Haven, Port Morris
Bronx CB 2	5.54	54,454	9,829	Hunts Point, Longwood
Bronx CB 3	4.07	93,755	23,036	Claremont, Concourse Village, Crotona Park, Morrisania
Bronx CB 4	5.28	150,436	28,492	Concourse, Highbridge, Mount Eden
Bronx CB 5	3.55	132,584	37,348	Fordham, Morris Heights, Mount Hope, University Heights
Bronx CB 6	4.01	89,216	22,248	Bathgate, Belmont, East Tremont, West Farms
Bronx CB 7	4.84	146,813	30,333	Bedford Park, Fordham Heights, Jerome Park, Kingsbridge Heights, Norwood, University Heights
Bronx CB 8	8.83	106,924	12,109	Fieldston, Kingsbridge, Kingsbridge Heights, Marble Hill, Riverdale, Spuyten Duyvil, Van Cortlandt Village
Bronx CB 9	12.41	188,249	15,169	Bronx River, Bruckner, Castle Hill, Clason Point, Harding Park, Parkchester, Soundview, Unionport
Bronx CB 10	16.76	130,763	7,802	City Island, Co-op City, Locust Point, Pelham Bay, Silver Beach, Throgs Neck, Westchester Square
Bronx CB 11	9.32	119,666	12,840	Allerton, Bronxdale, Indian Village, Laconia, Morris Park, Pelham Gardens, Pelham Parkway, Van Nest
Bronx CB 12	14.56	163,489	11,229	Baychester, Edenwald, Eastchester, Fish Bay, Olinville, Wakefield, Williamsbridge, Woodlawn Heights
Brooklyn CB 1	12.82	204,125	15,922	Greenpoint, Williamsburg, Williamsburg Houses
Brooklyn CB 2	7.72	130,021	16,842	Boerum Hill, Brooklyn Heights, Brooklyn Navy Yard, Clinton Hill, Dumbo, Fort Greene, Fulton Ferry, Fulton Mall, Vinegar Hill
Brooklyn CB 3	7.67	174,960	22,811	Bedford–Stuyvesant, Ocean Hill, Stuyvesant Heights
Brooklyn CB 4	5.31	120,747	22,740	Bushwick
Brooklyn CB 5	14.61	200,293	13,709	City Line, Cypress Hills, East New York, Highland Park, New Lots, Starrett City
Brooklyn CB 6	9.01	113,933	12,645	Carroll Gardens, Cobble Hill, Gowanus, Park Slope, Red Hook
Brooklyn CB 7	10.96	133,230	12,156	Greenwood Heights, Sunset Park, Windsor Terrace
Brooklyn CB 8	4.25	108,259	25,473	Crown Heights, Prospect Heights, Weeksville
Brooklyn CB 9	4.07	102,000	25,061	Crown Heights, Prospect Lefferts Gardens, Wingate
Brooklyn CB 10	10.57	136,071	12,873	Bay Ridge, Dyker Heights, Fort Hamilton
Brooklyn CB 11	10.18	198,870	19,535	Bath Beach, Bensonhurst, Gravesend, Mapleton
Brooklyn CB 12	9.32	205,377	22,036	Borough Park, Kensington, Midwood, Ocean Parkway
Brooklyn CB 13	8.88	108,905	12,264	Bensonhurst, Brighton Beach, Coney Island, Gravesend, Sea Gate
Brooklyn CB 14	7.61	164,568	21,625	Flatbush, Kensington, Midwood, Ocean Parkway
Brooklyn CB 15	12.82	169,632	13,232	East Gravesend, Gerritsen Beach, Homecrest, Kings Bay, Kings Highway, Madison, Manhattan Beach, Plum Beach, Sheepshead Bay
Brooklyn CB 16	4.97	98,506	19,820	Brownsville, Ocean Hill
Brooklyn CB 17	8.73	162,446	18,608	Ditmas Village, East Flatbush, Erasmus, Farragut, Remsen Village, Rugby
Brooklyn CB 18	24.68	204,095	8,270	Bergen Beach, Canarsie, Flatlands, Georgetown, Marine Park, Mill Basin, Mill Island
Manhattan CB 1	4.45	78,390	17,616	Battery Park City, Financial District, Tribeca
Manhattan CB 2	4.01	92,445	23,054	Chinatown, Greenwich Village, Little Italy, NoHo, SoHo, West Village
Manhattan CB 3	4.56	163,141	35,777	Alphabet City, Chinatown, East Village, Lower East Side, Two Bridges
Manhattan CB 4	5.41	131,351	24,279	Chelsea, Clinton, Hell's Kitchen, Hudson Yards
Manhattan CB 5	4.25	63,600	14,965	Midtown
Manhattan CB 6	3.55	155,614	43,835	Gramercy Park, Kips Bay, Rose Hill, Murray Hill, Peter Cooper Village, Stuyvesant Town, Sutton Place, Tudor City, Turtle Bay, Waterside Plaza
Manhattan CB 7	5.46	222,129	40,683	Lincoln Square, Manhattan Valley, Upper West Side
Manhattan CB 8	5.13	231,983	45,221	Lenox Hill, Roosevelt Island, Upper East Side, Yorkville
Manhattan CB 9	3.91	110,458	28,250	Hamilton Heights, Manhattanville, Morningside Heights
Manhattan CB 10	3.63	130,440	35,934	Harlem, Polo Grounds
Manhattan CB 11	5.75	125,771	21,873	East Harlem, Randall's Island, Spanish Harlem, Wards Island
Manhattan CB 12	7.64	180,206	23,587	Inwood, Washington Heights
Queens CB 1	14.97	196,803	13,146	Astoria, Astoria Heights, Queensbridge, Dutch Kills, Long Island City, Ravenswood, Rikers Island, Steinway
Queens CB 2	13.36	137,981	10,328	Blissville, Hunters Point, Long Island City, Sunnyside, Sunnyside Gardens, Woodside
Queens CB 3	7.33	179,134	24,438	East Elmhurst, Jackson Heights, North Corona
Queens CB 4	6.16	181,025	29,387	Corona, Elmhurst
Queens CB 5	19.63	178,178	9,077	Fresh Pond, Glendale, Maspeth, Middle Village, Liberty Park, Ridgewood
Queens CB 6	7.59	120,955	15,936	Forest Hills, Rego Park
Queens CB 7	32.97	269,587	8,177	Bay Terrace, Beechhurst, College Point, Flushing, Linden Hill, Malba, Queensboro Hill, Whitestone, Willets Point
Queens CB 8	19.17	161,402	8,420	Briarwood, Fresh Meadows, Holliswood, Jamaica Estates, Kew Gardens Hills, Pomonok, Pomonok Houses, Utopia
Queens CB 9	10.08	152,839	15,163	Kew Gardens, Ozone Park, Richmond Hill, Woodhaven
Queens CB 10	16.19	129,411	7,993	Howard Beach, Lindenwood, Richmond Hill, South Ozone Park, Tudor Village
Queens CB 11	24.99	122,211	4,890	Auburndale, Bayside, Douglaston, East Flushing, Hollis Hills, Little Neck, Oakland Gardens
Queens CB 12	25.46	256,278	10,066	Baisley Park, Jamaica, Hollis, Rochdale Village, St. Albans, South Jamaica, Springfield Gardens
Queens CB 13	33.31	199,218	5,981	Bellerose, Brookville, Cambria Heights, Floral Park, Glen Oaks, Laurelton, Meadowmere, Queens Village, Rosedale
Queens CB 14	23.28	124,173	5,334	Arverne, Bayswater, Belle Harbor, Breezy Point, Edgemere, Far Rockaway, Neponsit, Rockaway Park, Seaside
Staten Island CB 1	36.62	189,663	5,179	Arlington, Castleton Corners, Clifton, Concord, Elm Park, Fort Wadsworth, Graniteville, Grymes Hill, Livingston, Mariners Harbor, Meiers Corners, New Brighton, Port Ivory, Port Richmond, Randall Manor, Rosebank, St. George, Shore Acres, Silver Lake, Stapleton, Sunnyside, Tompkinsville, West Brighton, Westerleigh
Staten Island CB 2	54.62	140,795	2,578	Arrochar, Bloomfield, Bulls Head, Chelsea, Dongan Hills, Egbertville, Emerson Hill, Grant City, Grasmere, Midland Beach, New Dorp, New Springville, Oakwood, Ocean Breeze, Old Town, South Beach, Todt Hill, Travis
Staten Island CB 3	58.97	164,723	2,793	Annadale, Arden Heights, Bay Terrace, Charleston, Eltingville, Great Kills, Greenridge, Huguenot, Pleasant Plains, Prince's Bay, Richmond Valley, Rossville, Tottenville, Woodrow
New York City	831.39	8,804,190	10,590	

== See also ==
- New York City ethnic enclaves
