= Seaside, Queens =

Seaside
- Neighborhood of Queens
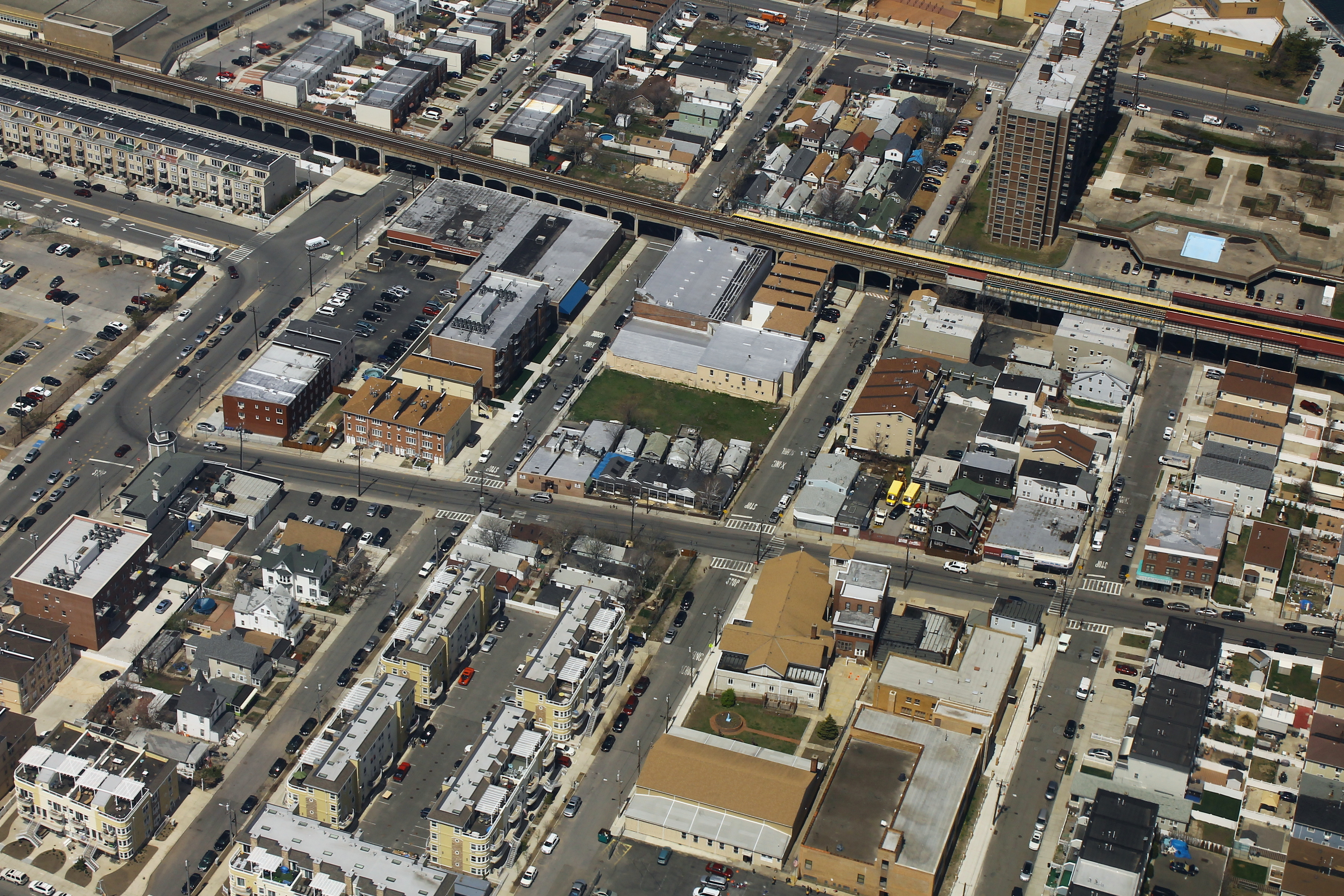
- Aerial view of the area
- Location within New York City
- Coordinates: 40.583°N 73.826°W
- Country: United States
- State: New York
- City: New York City
- County/Borough: Queens
- Community District: Queens 14
- Time zone: UTC−5 (EST)
  - Summer (DST): UTC−4 (EDT)
- ZIP Code: 11694
- Area codes: 718, 347, 929, and 917

Seaside is a section of the Rockaway Peninsula in the New York City borough of Queens. It is bordered by the Rockaway Beach neighborhood on the east, and by the neighborhood of Rockaway Park on the west. Formerly a resort community of small seasonal bungalows, Seaside is today dominated by middle-income high-rise Mitchell-Lama apartment buildings along its south shore beachfront. The zip code of Seaside is 11694.

The main roads through Seaside are Rockaway Beach Boulevard, Rockaway Freeway, and the never-finished Shore Front Parkway. The southern end of the Cross Bay Veterans Memorial Bridge can be found between Seaside and Rockaway Park. Seaside contains New York City Subway stations on the IND Rockaway Line (A and S trains) at Beach 105th and Beach 98th Streets.
