= CB7 =

CB7 may refer to:

- CB postcode area, in England
- Queens Community Board 7, a local governmental advisory board in New York City
- .cb7, a file extension for 7z-compressed comic book archive files
- CB7, a 2020 album by German rapper Capital Bra
