= Bayswater, Queens =

Neighborhood in New York City

Bayswater
- Neighborhood of Queens
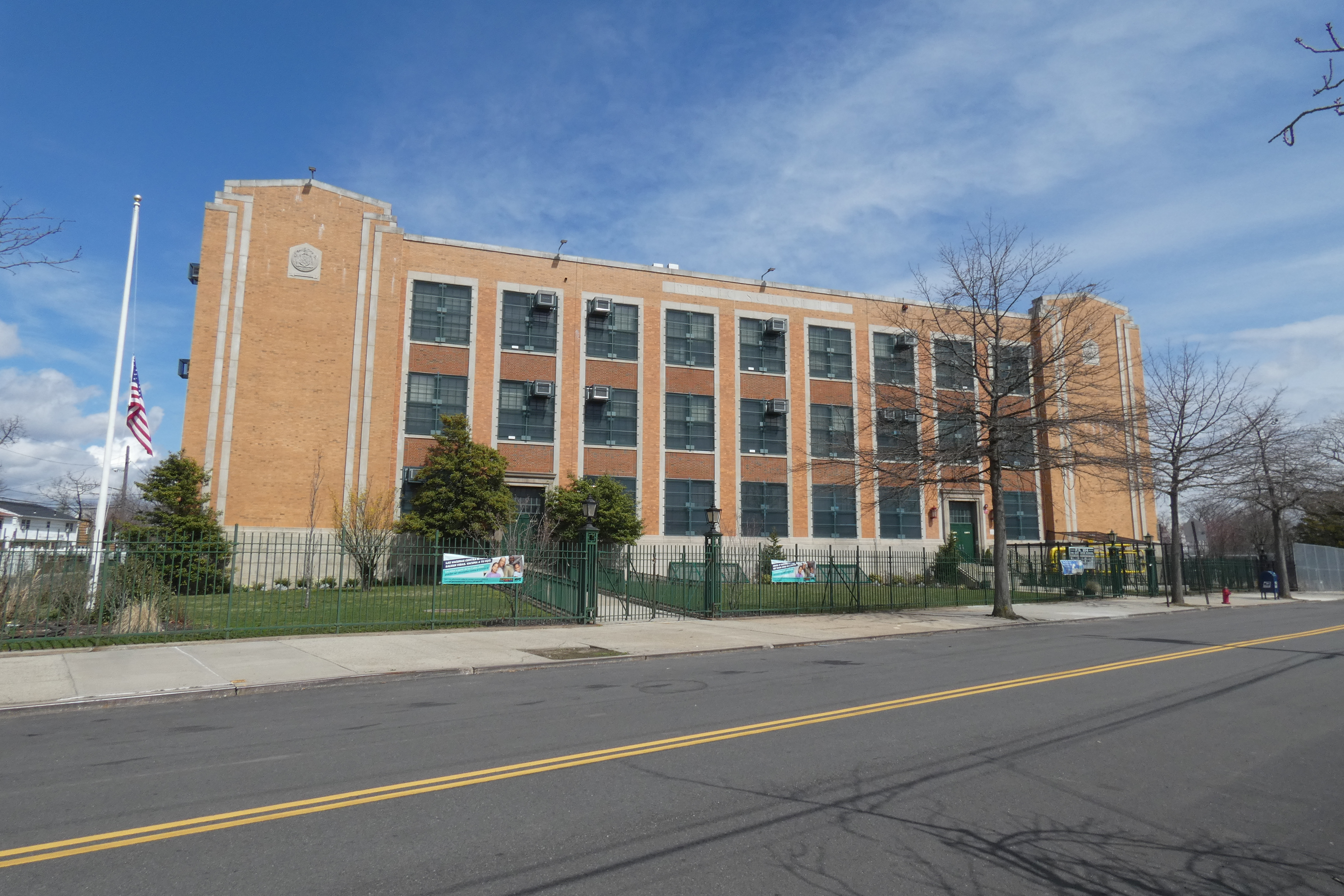
- PS 104, an elementary school in the neighborhood
- Interactive map of Bayswater
- Coordinates: 40.605°N 73.765°W
- Country: United States
- State: New York
- City: New York City
- County/Borough: Queens
- Community District: Queens 14

Population (2019)
  - Total: 19,128

Race and Ethnicity
  - Black: 47%
  - Hispanic (Note: Hispanic includes respondents of any race. Other categories are non-Hispanic.): 27%
  - White: 21%
  - Asian: 4%
  - Multiracial: 1%
- Time zone: UTC−5 (EST)
  - Summer (DST): UTC−4 (EDT)
- ZIP Code: 11691
- Area codes: 718, 347, 929, and 917

Bayswater is a small neighborhood in the New York City borough of Queens, on the eastern end of the Rockaway Peninsula. The community is located to the northwest of Far Rockaway, along the southeastern shore of Jamaica Bay.

One of Bayswater's early developers was William Trist Bailey, who had purchased the property and laid out the community around 1878, hence the street names Bailey Court and Trist Place. Once the location of a number of summer hotels such as the Elstone Park and the Sunset Lodge, Bayswater is now a year-round residential neighborhood. Bayswater has a diverse population with large numbers of Black and Orthodox Jewish residents. The Bayswater Civic Association represents the area.

Bayswater is located in Queens Community District 14 and its ZIP Code is 11691. It is patrolled by the New York City Police Department's 101st Precinct. Bayswater is served by limited Q22 bus service.

== See also ==
- Bayswater Point State Park
