= Willets Point =

Neighborhood in New York City

- Neighborhood of Queens
- Willets Point in July 2026, as seen from Citi Field.
- Location within New York City
- Coordinates: 40.758°N 73.842°W
- Country: United States
- State: New York
- City: New York City
- County/Borough: Queens
- Community District: Queens 7

Population
  - Estimate (2011): 10
- Time zone: UTC−5 (Eastern)
  - Summer (DST): UTC−4 (EDT)
- ZIP Code: 11368
- Area codes: 718, 347, 929, and 917

Willets Point, also known locally as the Iron Triangle, is an industrial neighborhood within Corona, in the New York City borough of Queens. Located east of Citi Field near the Flushing River, it has been known for its automobile shops and junkyards. It had a population of 10 people in 2011.

Proposals to redevelop Willets Point started after World War II, but gained full traction in 2007. New York City Council members and the few residents of the area strongly opposed the original plan, leading to several years of lawsuits. In 2011, the city began a $4 billion redevelopment project to construct a retail shopping center, residential buildings with a combined 3,000 units, an entertainment complex, and a public school. The New York City Economic Development Corporation's plan to redevelop the area was approved in 2013, and demolition of the industrial section of Willets Point began in 2016.

The new development was originally set to open in stages between 2018 and 2032. However, the redevelopment plans were changed after a New York state court blocked the construction of the shopping center. The development was re-approved in February 2018. Etihad Park, a soccer specific stadium due to open for the 2027–28 Major League Soccer season, began construction on the Willets Point site with a groundbreaking ceremony in December 2024.

== Description ==
Willets Point is bounded by Northern Boulevard to the north, 126th Street and Citi Field to the west, Roosevelt Avenue and Flushing Meadows–Corona Park to the south, and the Flushing River to the east. The New York City Subway's Mets–Willets Point station, serving the 7 and <7> trains, is located at the southwest corner of the area, at Roosevelt Avenue and 126th Street. New York City Bus's Casey Stengel depot is also in that area, as well as the Q90 bus. The neighborhood is part of Queens Community District 7.

Willets Point is zoned mostly for industrial activity. It has no sidewalks or sewers as of 2013, and due to the area's geography and the lack of paved roads in the area, flooding is common during heavy rains. The area consists mostly of auto repair shops, scrap yards, waste processing sites, and similar small businesses. It has been described as being "post-apocalyptic" in appearance. A Hunter College study in April 2006 found that Willets Point was a "unique regional destination" for auto parts and repairs, and that the 225 businesses in the area employed a combined 1,400 to 1,800 people at the time. It had a population of 10 people as of 2011. The concentration of auto-repair shops resulted in the area's nickname, "Iron Triangle".

== History ==
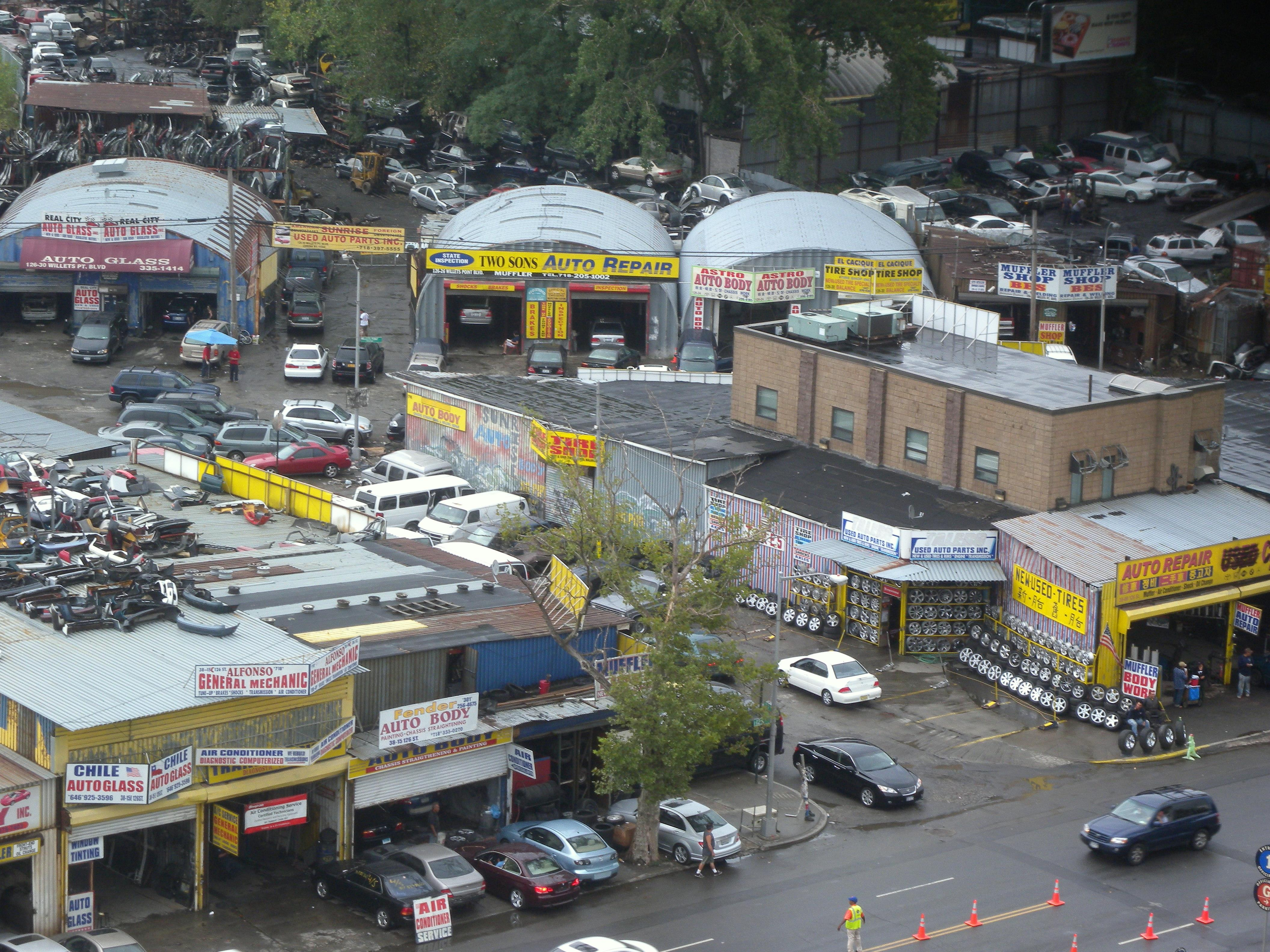
Willets Point, as seen from Citi Field looking east (2010)

The area was named after the portion of Willets Point Boulevard lying west of Flushing Creek, which flows northward past the area. Willets Point Boulevard once crossed a now-demolished bridge over Flushing Creek and continued to the Willets Point cape, at the confluence of the East River and Long Island Sound. The original Willets Point is the site of Fort Totten near Bayside, but over the course of the 20th century it became commonplace to apply the name "Willets Point" (derived from the street, rather than the geographical feature) to the area on the Flushing River instead. The neighborhood, street, and cape's name are all derived from the Willets family, whose land the government bought in 1857 to build Fort Totten (originally named "Fort at Willets Point").

The area is also referred to as "Willet Point" [sic] in the official New York State Gazetteer, maintained and published by the New York State Department of Health, which includes numerous defunct hamlets and towns, some with alternate or archaic spellings.

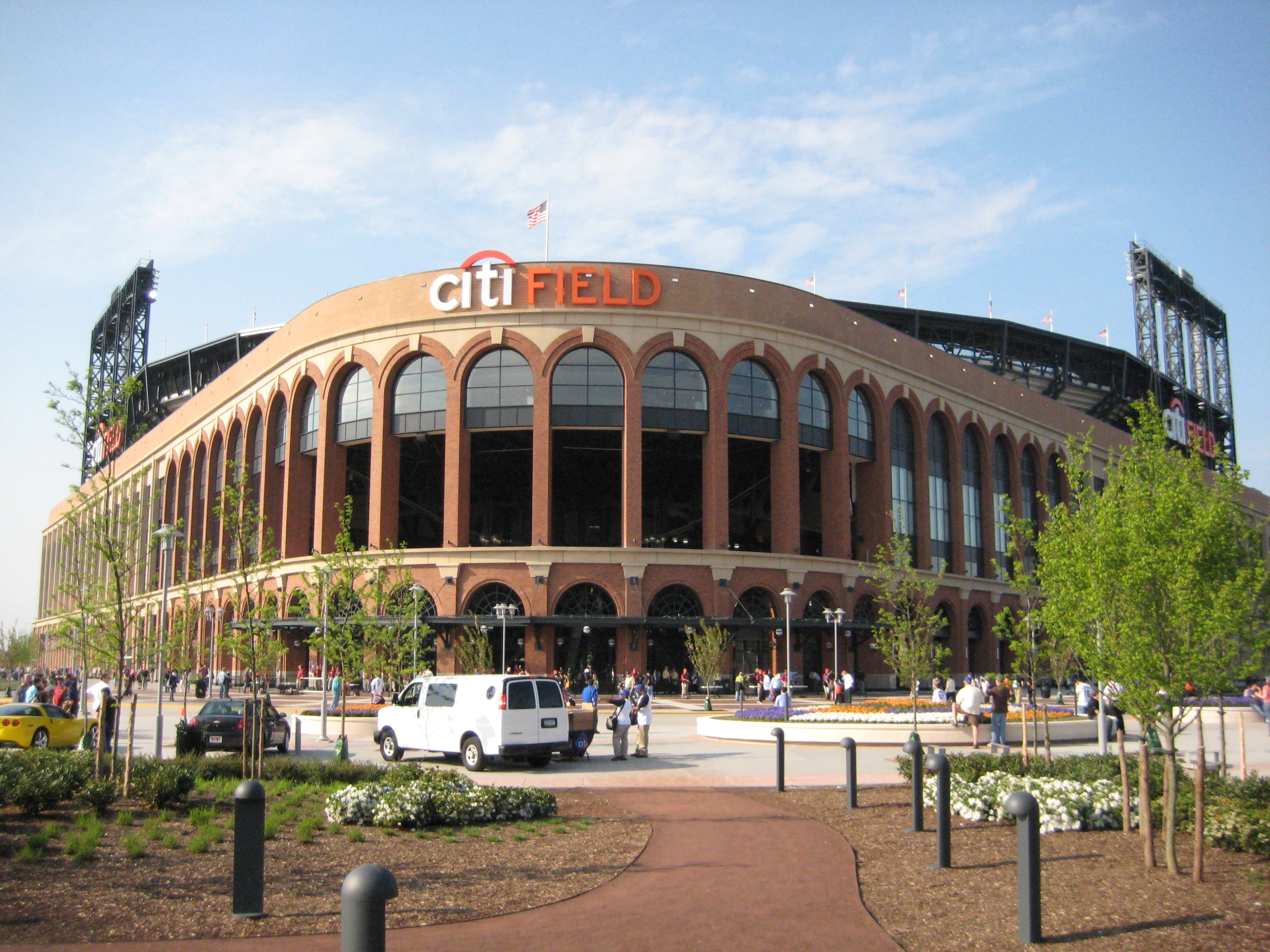
Citi Field, which opened in Willets Point in 2009

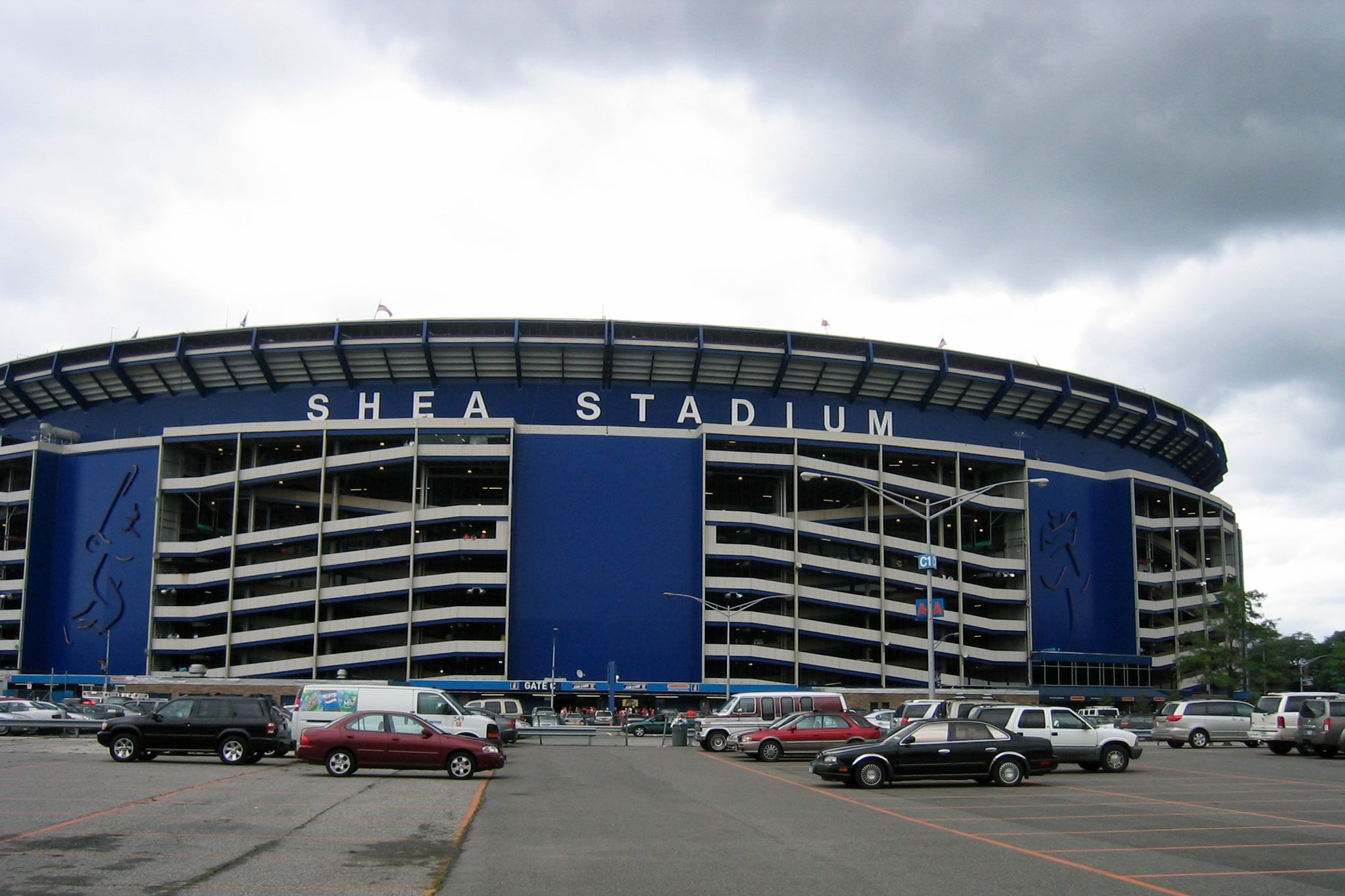
Shea Stadium, which was located in Willets Point from 1964 to 2008

By the end of World War II, Willets Point was known as an area of auto junkyards. Since then, several redevelopment plans for Willets Point were proposed, but never implemented. Before the 1964 New York World's Fair, Robert Moses tried to incorporate Willets Point into Flushing Meadows–Corona Park but failed when the junkyard owners hired Mario Cuomo as their lawyer. Moses regarded the region as an "eyesore and a disgrace to the borough of Queens". Shea Stadium, home of the New York Mets of Major League Baseball and the New York Jets of the American Football League and later the National Football League, was opened in 1964, the same year as the World's Fair.

After the Jets left Shea Stadium at the end of the 1983 season to play at the Meadowlands, Willets Point was the proposed location for a new, 82,000-seat domed football stadium that would bring the Jets back to New York. After the Jets decided to remain in New Jersey, the proposed stadium was also discussed as a potential new home for the St. Louis Cardinals of the NFL, the Atlanta Falcons, and the New Jersey Generals. By the 1990s, the Mets were looking to replace the aging Shea Stadium.

New York City Mayor Michael Bloomberg started planning for the redevelopment of Willets Point in 2002. Citi Field was originally proposed as part of the city's bid for the 2012 Summer Olympics, which was submitted in 2005. Willets Point was supposed to contain athletes' housing. Even though New York City lost the bid to London, the plans for Citi Field progressed anyway. Following Citi Field's completion, Shea Stadium was demolished in 2009. Starting in 2009, the neighborhood was discussed as a potential site for the New York Islanders of the National Hockey League to move to, before they moved to UBS Arena, adjacent to Belmont Park in 2021. Willets Point is currently planned to be the home of Etihad Park for New York City FC of Major League Soccer.

Hard Rock International and New York Mets owner Steve Cohen have proposed building a 2,300 room integrated resort in the parking lots west of Citi Field which would include a casino and be the largest hotel in New York City if built. The success of this proposal is dependent on the proposal receiving a casino license.

== Redevelopment ==
=== Initial proposal and controversy ===
On May 1, 2007, Mayor Bloomberg announced his administration's new plan for urban renewal in the area. The plan called for replacing the scrapyards and industrial sites with a sustainable and affordable mixed-use development including a convention center, 5,500 units of housing, 1.7 million square feet (0.16×10^{6} m^{2}) of retail, 130,000 square feet (12,000 m^{2}) for a school, 500,000 square feet (46,000 m^{2}) of office space, 150,000 square feet (14,000 m^{2}) Community Facility, as well as environmental remediation, installation of sewers and other infrastructure, and relocation of previous businesses. Willets Point would create more than 5,300 permanent jobs and add 18,000 construction jobs.

On April 9, 2008, the Willets Point Industry and Realty Association (WPIRA), a group of the 10 largest business and land owners in Willets Point, filed a lawsuit in the US District Court for the Eastern District of New York against the City of New York seeking a court order requiring the City to provide infrastructure improvements, including repairs to streets and storm sewers, installation of sanitary sewers, street lights, street signs and other services that the City had allegedly withheld for over 40 years, as well as unspecified damages for past neglect. Judge Edward R. Korman granted the City's motion to dismiss this lawsuit on November 25, 2009.

On April 21, 2008, a majority of the New York City Council's members expressed their "adamant opposition" to the proposed Willets Point redevelopment in writing to Robert Lieber, New York City's Deputy Mayor for Economic Development. The "adamant opposition" letter was signed by 29 City Council members. Three days later, Queens elected officials, various union members and others rallied at a press conference on the steps of New York City Hall. The gathering was in support of having the City move forward with the proposed development of Willets Point. The rally was led by Queens Borough President Helen M. Marshall. Also in attendance were state senators Frank Padavan and Toby Ann Stavisky and Assembly Member Nettie Mayersohn, and former Queens Borough President Claire Shulman.

On June 30, 2008, the plan was approved with numerous conditions by Queens Community Board 7 and by the City Planning Commission on September 24, 2008. The City Council held a public hearing regarding the plan on October 17 and voted on November 13, 2008, to approve the redevelopment plan, which includes the potential use of eminent domain to acquire property. Some property owners have vowed to try to stop the plan through litigation, while others voluntarily sold their property to the City during the fall of 2008 so as to avert involuntary taking of their property through eminent domain and relocation by the New York City Economic Development Corporation. On July 31, 2009, the Corporation announced plans to invest $100 million into infrastructure projects in Queens that would include development in Willets Point.

In March 2009, Joseph Ardizzone, the only resident of Willets Point at the time, as well several local businesses filed another lawsuit in state court. The new suit challenged the City's approval of the development plan and contending that the plan had undergone inadequate environmental review. Allegations arose in 2009 that the City of New York and its Economic Development Corporation had improperly provided funding to organizations that lobbied the City Council in favor of the Willets Point development plan. In May 2010 the New York City Department of Transportation opened a new Municipal Asphalt Plant on Harper Street, on the north side of Willets Point.

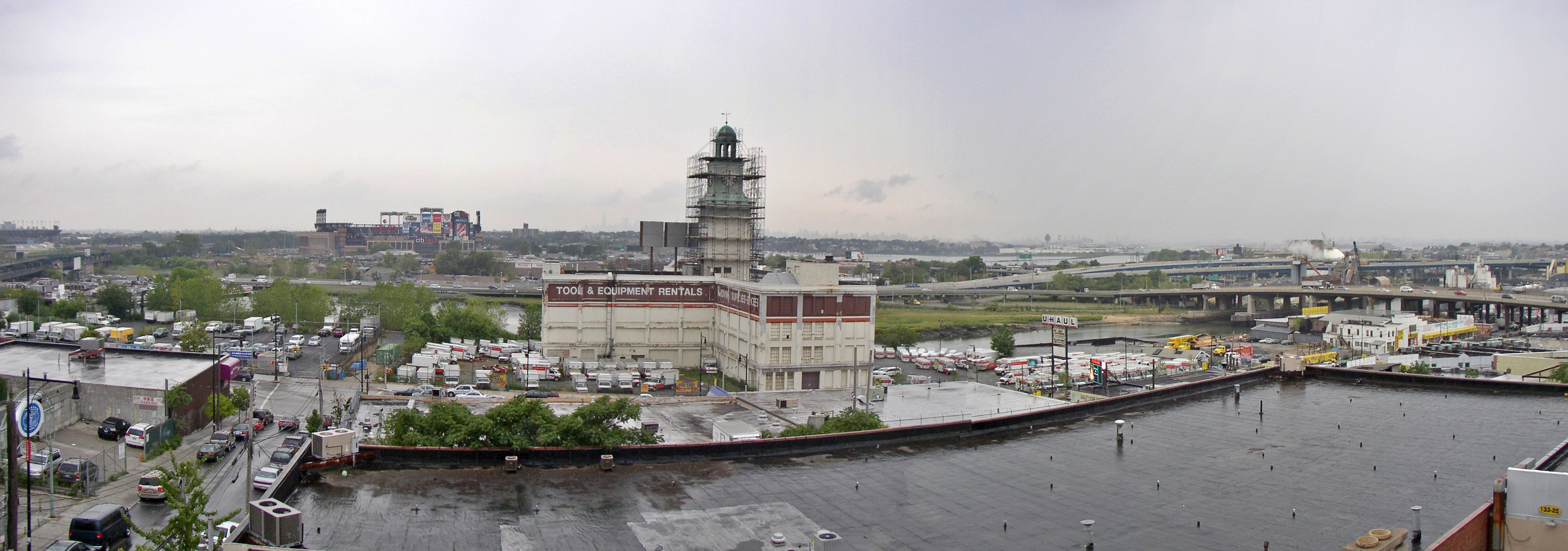
From Flushing; Willets Point is in the background and to the left is Citi Field (2010)

=== Plan approved by City Council ===
In 2011, the $4 billion redevelopment project began. The next year, the city changed the agreement to include a mall with 200 stores, as well as a 2,500-unit housing development, of which 875 would be affordable housing. This caused a change in public opinion, and many of the project's original supporters came to oppose the mall. A draft supplemental environmental impact statement (EIS) was published on March 15, 2013, and a final EIS was published on August 9. At the time of the FEIS's approval, the redevelopment area consisted of four parking lots around Citi Field, as well as a "Special Willets Point District" consisting of a triangle-shaped area where most of the industry was located. On October 9 of the same year, the City Council approved the Willets Point redevelopment plan.

In phase 1A of the plan, which was expected to be completed in 2018, a 200-room hotel would have been constructed alongside a retail area of 30,000 square feet (2,800 m^{2}), connected by an esplanade at 126th Street. There would have been a temporary 2,825-spot parking lot east of the hotel and retail area, which would host recreational events for at least half the year. Meanwhile, one of Citi Field's western parking lots would have been demolished to make room for a mall with 1,000,000 square feet (93,000 m^{2}) of leasable retail space and up to 200 stores including anchors. The mall would have included a food court, a movie theater, and a new 2,900-spot parking structure. Another 1,800-spot parking structure would have replaced an existing 640-spot western portion of Citi Field's South Lot south of Roosevelt Avenue. Even after Phase 1A was finished, there would still be a portion of the Willets Point triangle for automotive and industrial uses.

Phase 1B of the plan would have taken ten more years to build, and would have complete by 2028. The temporary 2,825-spot lot would have been gradually redeveloped into 4,230,000 square feet (393,000 m^{2}) of "residential, retail, additional hotel, office, parking, and community facility" development, as well as a public school and 6 acres (2.4 ha) of parkland. The eastern portion of the South Lot, as well as Lot D to the east, would have been replaced with two 6-floor parking structures. This proposal for Phase 1B would have followed the same zoning map as in Phase 1A. As in Phase 1A, a smaller portion of the Willets Point triangle was to remain for automotive and industrial uses. Since the streets in this part of the redevelopment project slope downward, the Phase 1B development would have also graded downward toward the industrial section of the neighborhood. The Van Wyck Expressway would also have had two new access ramps to serve Phase 1B. The city allocated $66 million of their budget for the design and construction of the new ramps.

Housing would have been built as part of the second phase of the project, set to be complete by 2032. There would have been 2,490 housing units, of which 35%, or 1,000, will be affordable units. However, in the 2013 FEIS, the EDC stipulated that there might be up to 5,850 housing units, which would comprise a combined 5,850,000 square feet (543,000 m^{2}) of space. There would also be 1,250,000 square feet (116,000 m^{2}) of retail space; 500,000 square feet (46,000 m^{2}) of office space; 400,000 square feet (37,000 m^{2}) of space for a new convention center; 560,000 square feet (52,000 m^{2}) for a hotel or hotels with a combined 700 rooms; 150,000 square feet (14,000 m^{2}) for a community center; 230,000 square feet (21,000 m^{2}) for a public school; and 8 acres (3.2 ha) of parkland. Parking would also be expanded up to 6,700 spaces based on demand. Lot B, located between Citi Field and Roosevelt Avenue, would likely have a retail area, a parking lot, and a 10-floor office building. This would significantly alter the zoning for the area, but would also bring more economic activity into Flushing and Corona.

=== Changes to plan ===
In 2014, Bill de Blasio replaced Michael Bloomberg as mayor of New York City. He opposed the redevelopment plan because of the lack of affordable housing, but the City Council approved the project in 2015. State Senator Tony Avella and a small community group sued to stop the mall from being built. In June 2015, a state court ruled that the mall could not be built on a parking lot in Willets Point. The developers appealed the lawsuit, but the city's government refused to join in on the appeal.

By the end of July 2016, the last auto repair shops between 38th and Roosevelt Avenues had been closed and demolition had started on the development, now priced at US$4 billion. Most Willets Points business owners either went out of business or moved to Hunts Point, Bronx. Actual construction on the Phase 1 shopping area was halted by a 2015 lawsuit, which was filed to prevent the retail area from being built in a portion of the neighborhood that is legally part of Flushing Meadows–Corona Park. The suit did not preclude any other part of Phase 1A from being built. The New York Supreme Court, which began hearing arguments in April 2017, ruled against the construction of the mall on June 6.

In February 2018, the de Blasio administration and developers came to an agreement in which 1,100 lower- and middle-class apartments, a 450-pupil school, parks, and 6 acres (2.4 ha) of retail space would be built. The new plan did not include a mall, as the original plan had. Under the agreement, the developers The Related Companies and Sterling Equities were expected to clear all toxic materials from Willets Point by 2020, and the first 500 apartments were expected to open by 2022. The project was further delayed until May 2021, when the Queens Borough Board voted to allow phase 1 of the Willets Point development to proceed.

=== Construction ===
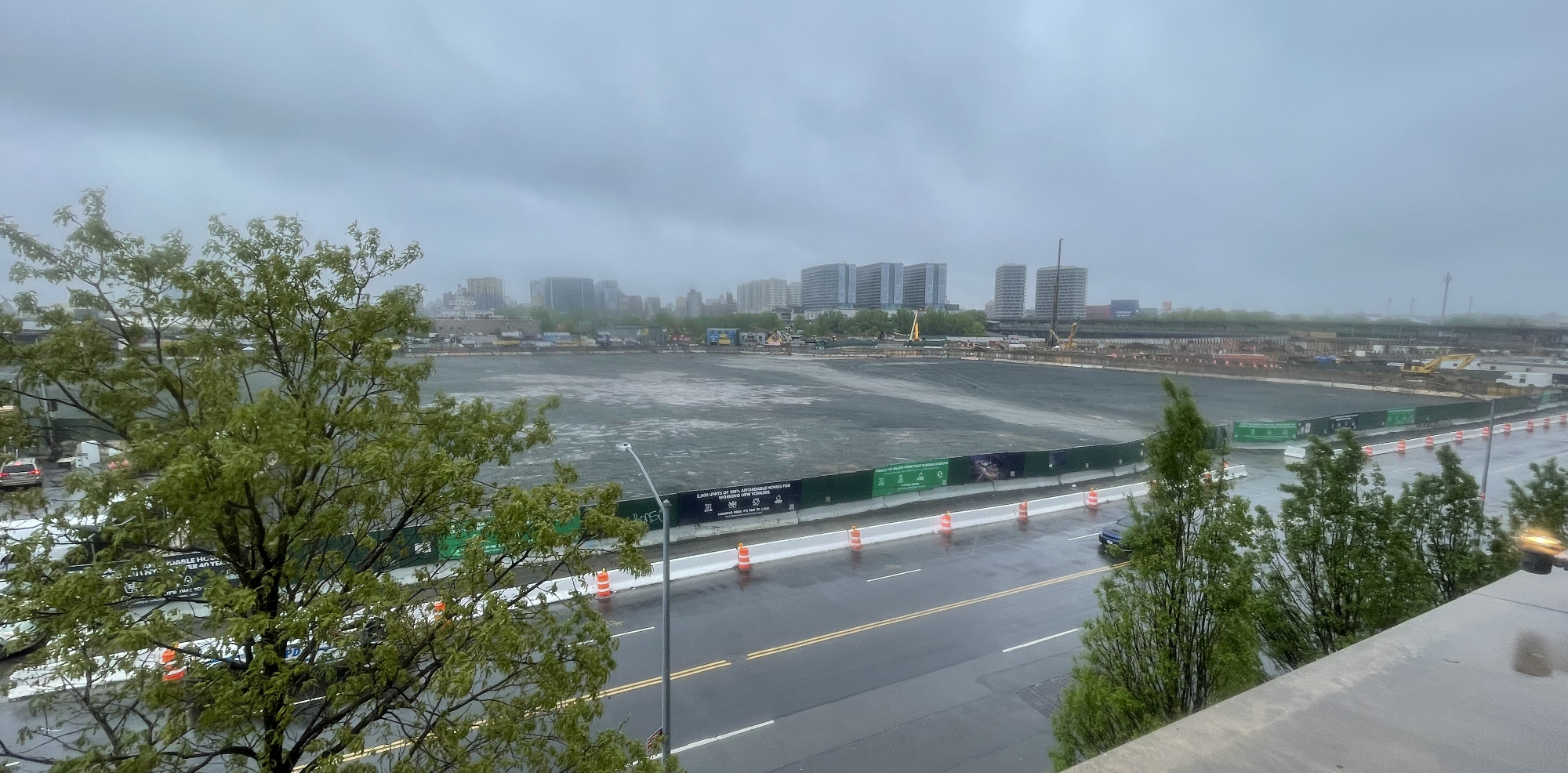
Willets Point in May 2024, between completion of soil remediation and construction of Etihad Park.

A groundbreaking ceremony for the project took place on June 16, 2021. The event marked the beginning of a three-year pollution remediation project at the site. In November 2022, the government of New York City and New York City FC of Major League Soccer agreed to build a 25,000-seat stadium named Etihad Park in Willets Point. The stadium was expected to be completed in 2027. It would be part of a larger mixed-use development with a 250-room hotel and 2,500 housing units on a 23-acre (9.3 ha) lot. The construction of Etihad Park began in December 2024; at the time, it was planned to open in 2027. The two residential buildings in the first phase of Willets Point's redevelopment were halfway completed in January 2025 and topped out that May.

== In popular culture ==
The "Valley of Ashes" described in F. Scott Fitzgerald's novel The Great Gatsby is said to have been inspired by a former dump (now the location of Flushing Meadows–Corona Park) in Willets Point. The 2007 film Chop Shop was also filmed and set in this neighborhood. The 2010 dramatic film Willets Point, directed by T. J. Collins, is set in the neighborhood.

The 2018 documentary The Iron Triangle, directed by Prudence Katze and William Lehman, describes the history behind the destruction of the once-thriving neighborhood.

The 2010 cinéma vérité documentary Foreign Parts is shot in Willets Point and shows life and industry there prior to redevelopment.
