= Queens Community Board 1 =

Queens Community District 1 Queens Community Board 1
- Community District
- Country: United States
- State: New York
- City: New York City
- Borough: Queens
- Neighborhoods: list: Astoria; Ditmars; Long Island City; Queensbridge; Ravenswood; Rikers Island; Steinway; Woodside

Government
  - Type: Community board
  - Body: Queens Community Board 1
  - Chairperson: Evie Hantzopoulos
  - District Manager: Florence Koulouris

Area
  - Total: 6.2 sq mi (16 km^{2})

Population (2016)
  - Total: 172,468
  - Density: 28,000/sq mi (11,000/km^{2})

Ethnicity
  - African American: 6.3%
  - Asian: 15.9%
  - Hispanic and Latino Americans: 27.2%
  - White: 47.8%
  - Others: 2.9%
- Time zone: UTC−5 (Eastern)
  - Summer (DST): UTC−4 (EDT)
- ZIP codes: 11101, 11102, 11103, 11105, 11106, and 11370
- Area codes: 718, 347, and 929, and 917
- Police Precincts: 114th (website)
- Website: www1.nyc.gov/site/queenscb1/index.page

The Queens Community Board 1 is a local advisory group in New York City, encompassing the neighborhoods of Astoria, Long Island City, Queensbridge, Ditmars, Ravenswood, Steinway, Garden Bay, and Woodside, in the Borough of Queens. It also includes Rikers Island, the citywide correctional complex, which is within the Borough of the Bronx but connected by its only bridge to Astoria. The Board's district is delimited by the East River on both west and north, by the Brooklyn–Queens Expressway on the east, and by Northern Boulevard, the Long Island Rail Road and Bridge Plaza North on the south.

As of November 2026, the current chairperson is Evie Hantzopoulos.

== Demographics ==
Historical population
Year	Pop.	±%
1980	185,198	—
1990	188,549	+1.8%
2000	211,220	+12.0%
2010	191,105	−9.5%
2012-2016 Est.	172,468	−9.8%
Source: NYC Planning (1980-2004, 2016)

As of the United States Census, 2000, the Community Board had a population of 211,220, up from 188,549 in 1990 and 185,198 in 1980.

Of them (as of 2000), 88,606 (41.9%) were White non-Hispanic, 21,581 (10.2%) were African American, 27,399 (13.0%) were Asian or Pacific Islander, 475 (0.2%) were American Indian or Native Alaskan, 3,099 (1.5%) were of some other race, 12,368 (5.9%) were of two or more races, and 57,692 (27.3%) were Hispanic.

As of 2004, 23.4% of the population benefited from public assistance, which was up from 13.2% in 2000.

== Geography ==
The land area is 3,702.0 acres (14.981 km^{2}), or 5.8 square miles (15 km^{2}).
