= Breezy Point, Queens =

Neighborhood in New York City

Breezy Point
- Neighborhood of Queens
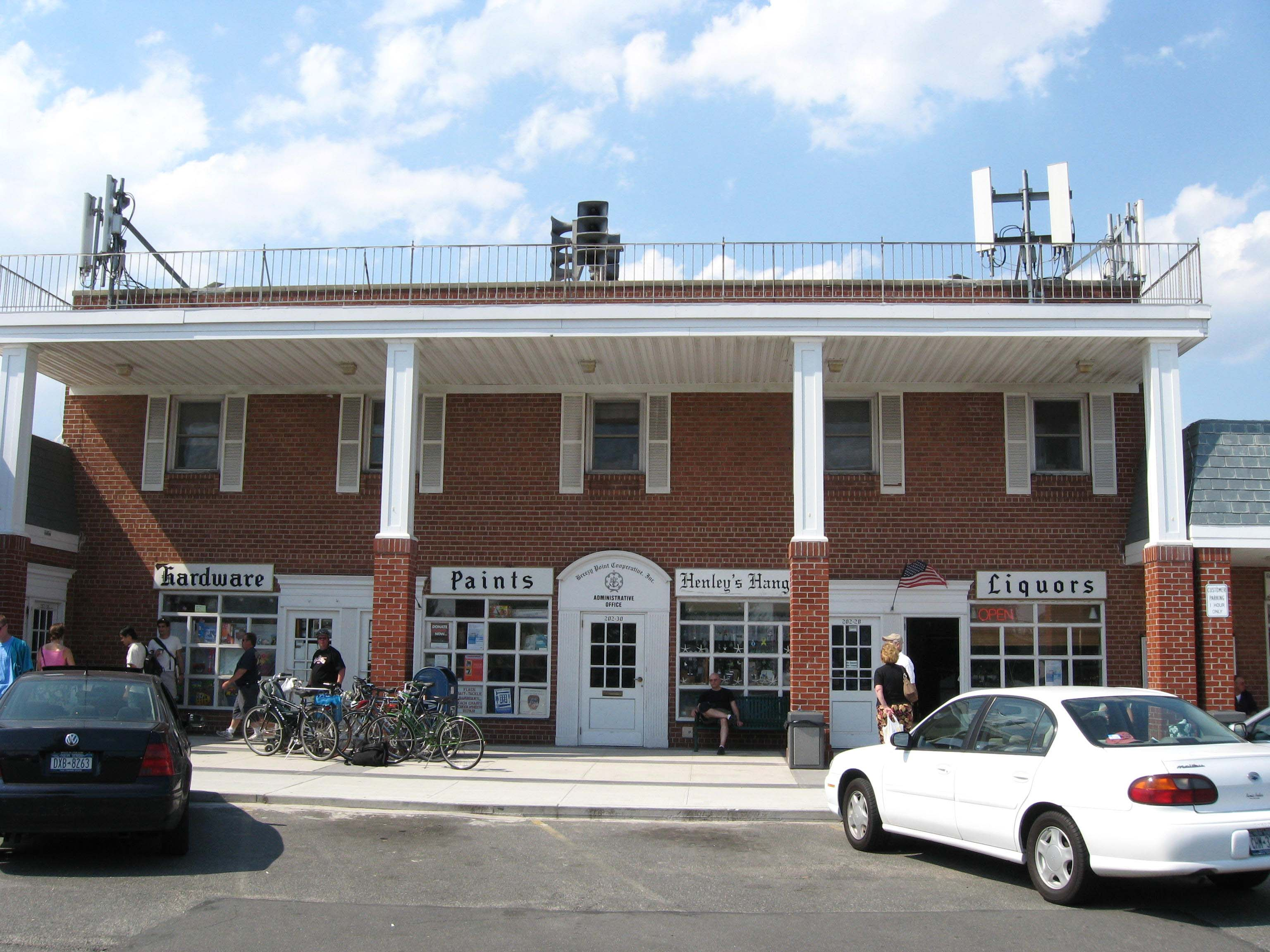
- Breezy Point Shopping Center
- Nicknames: Irish Riviera, Cois Farraige
- Interactive map of Breezy Point
- Coordinates: 40.555°N 73.925°W
- Country: United States
- State: New York
- City: New York City
- County/Borough: Queens
- Community District: Queens 14

Area
  - Total: 0.78 sq mi (2.0 km^{2})

Population (2010)
  - Total: 4,079

Ethnicity
  - White: 98.2%
  - Black: 0.1%
  - Hispanic: 1.2%
  - Asian: 0.6%
  - Other: 0.1%

Economics
  - Median income: $86,941
- Time zone: UTC−5 (EST)
  - Summer (DST): UTC−4 (EDT)
- ZIP Code: 11697
- Area codes: 718, 347, 929, and 917
- Website: breezypointcoop.org

Breezy Point is a neighborhood in the New York City borough of Queens, located on the western end of the Rockaway peninsula, between Rockaway Inlet and Jamaica Bay to the north and the Atlantic Ocean to the west and south. The community is run by the Breezy Point Cooperative, in which all residents pay the maintenance, security, and community-oriented costs involved with keeping the community private. The cooperative owns the entire 500-acre (2 km^{2}) community; residents own their homes and hold shares in the cooperative.

The New York Times described Breezy Point as consisting of "three small neighborhoods:" Rockaway Point, Roxbury, and namesake Breezy Point, and that Rockaway Point Boulevard "runs between the sections."

It is less urbanized than most of the rest of New York City, and it is part of Queens Community District 14. Breezy Point is patrolled by the 100th Precinct of the New York City Police Department; its ZIP Code is 11697.

== Geography ==
Breezy Point's three neighborhoods are:

- Breezy Point, west of Ocean Avenue near the tip of the peninsula
- Rockaway Point, between Ocean Avenue and Beach 201st Street, and
- Roxbury, about a mile east, near the Marine Parkway Bridge leading to Brooklyn.

Breezy Point Tip, to the west of the community, is part of Gateway National Recreation Area, which is run by the National Park Service. This isolated, 200-acre (0.81 km^{2}) area includes an ocean-facing beach, a shoreline on Jamaica Bay, sand dunes, and marshland. It is a breeding spot for the piping plover, least tern, black skimmer, American oystercatcher and common tern.

== Demographics ==
Based on data from the 2010 United States census, the population of the combined area of Breezy Point/Belle Harbor/Rockaway Park/Broad Channel was 28,018, an increase of 1,307 (4.9%) from the 26,711 counted in 2000. Covering an area of 2,033.88 acres (823.08 ha), the four neighborhoods had a population density of 13.8 inhabitants per acre (8,800/sq mi).

The racial makeup of the neighborhoods was 78.3% (21,946) White, 7.5% (2,095) African American, 0.1% (29) Native American, 2.1% (595) Asian, 0.0% (8) Pacific Islander, 0.2% (66) from other races, and 0.9% (259) from two or more races. Hispanic or Latino of any race were 10.8% (3,020) of the population.

However, according to the United States Census Bureau, the community's ZIP Code (11697) is 98.2% white and has the nation's 2nd highest concentration of Irish-Americans, at 60.3% as of the United States Census, 2000 (Squantum, in Quincy, Massachusetts, is number 1, at 65%). The community's demographics are maintained as a result of a Cooperative rule that a person, prior to buying a house, must be recommended by three members of the Cooperative and approved by its board of directors. Breezy Point functions mainly as a summer get-away for many residents of New York. Estimates put summer residency at 12,000, while year-round residency was 4,337 in the most recent Census.

Due to its history of population by Irish-Americans, Breezy Point has been called the "Irish Riviera." Since the mid-1990s, Italians and Jews have also moved into Breezy Point, making the concentration of Irish-Americans drop.

== History ==
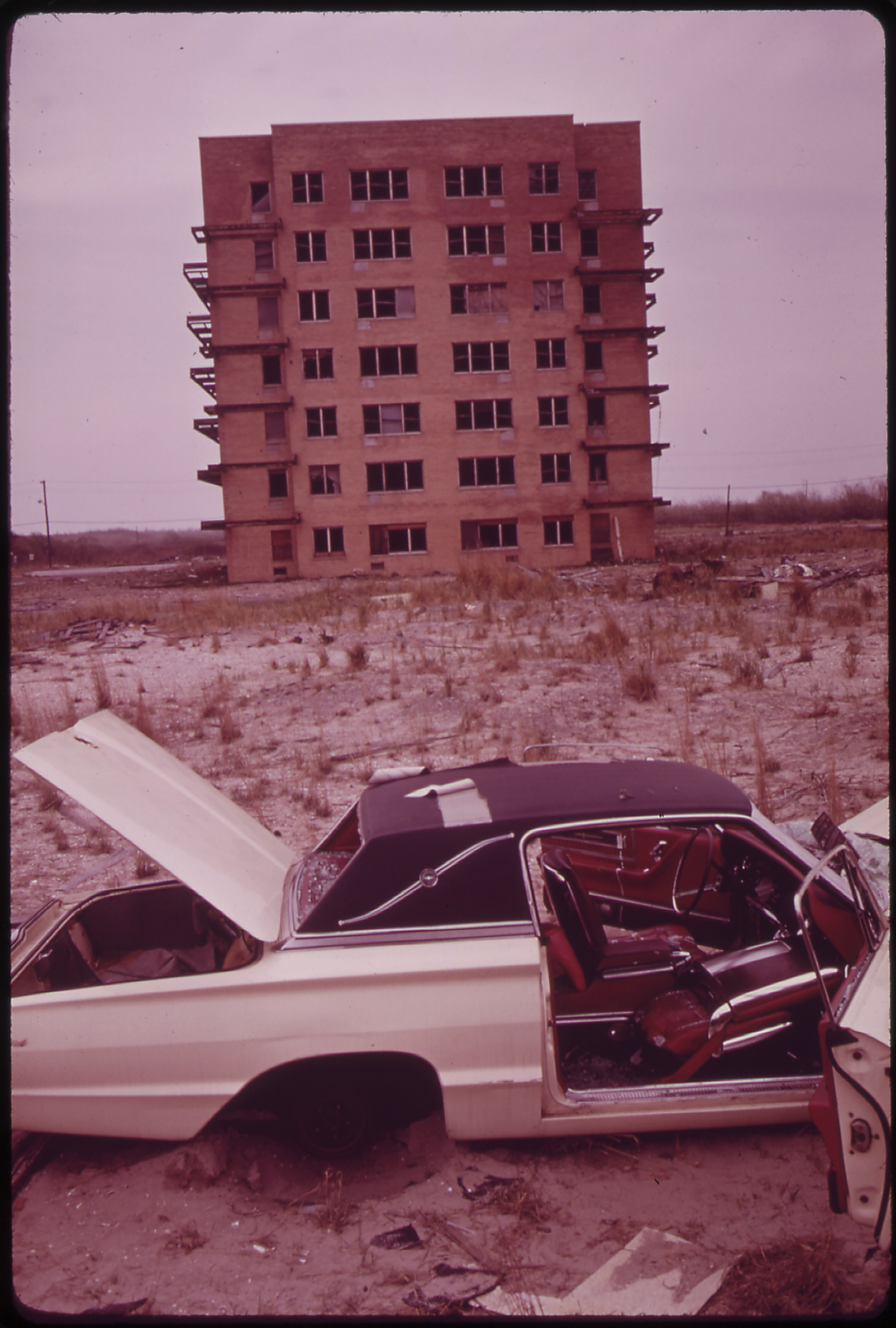
Apartment house abandoned during construction, 1973. Photo by Arthur Tress.

The community began as summer beach bungalows, in the "early 1900s", according to the New York Times although this is impossible because at the time the shoreline was further east until landfill extended the Rockaways. Breezy Point was sold to the Atlantic Improvement State Corporation for $17 million in 1960. The residents of the community purchased half of the land for approximately $11 million and formed the Breezy Point Cooperative. Today, it consists of about 3,500 homes. The construction of apartment buildings commenced in the late 1960s and was halted by City ordinance.

The Silver Gull Beach Club, located in Breezy Point, doubled as the El Flamingo Beach Club in the 1984 film The Flamingo Kid.

As a partially gated community, Breezy Point is patrolled by its own private security force that restricts access to owners, renters and their guests. It also features three of New York City's nine remaining volunteer fire departments.

On September 8, 2012, the community was struck by a tornado shortly before 11 a.m. that started as a waterspout over the Atlantic Ocean and came ashore at the Breezy Point Surf Club.

=== Hurricane Sandy and subsequent fire ===
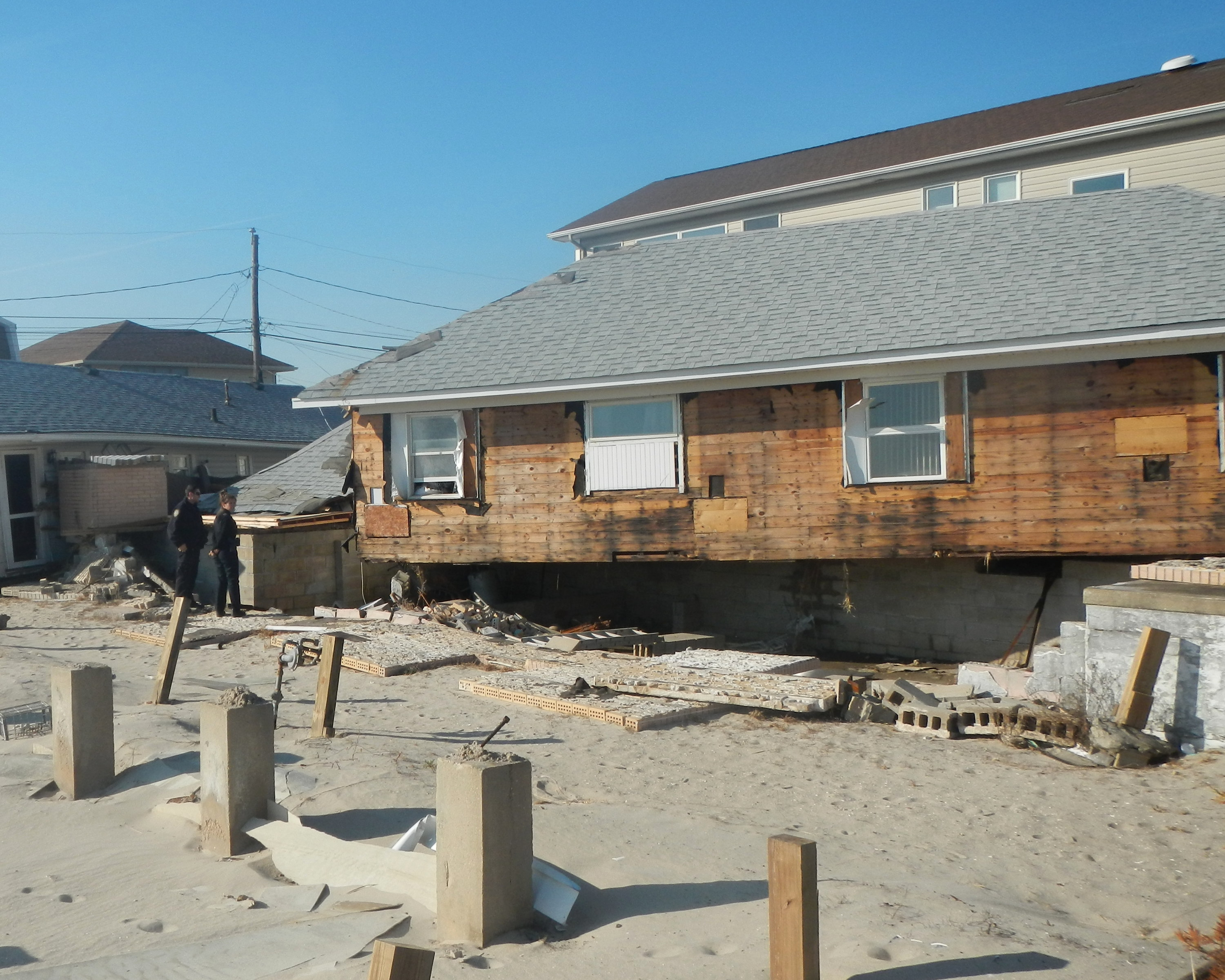
Hurricane Sandy damage

On October 29, 2012, Breezy Point was hit hard by Hurricane Sandy. Jamaica Bay and the Atlantic Ocean flooded the land between these bodies of water. Most Breezy Point homes were damaged or destroyed by high water, and basements and vehicles were ruined. The hurricane also damaged nearly half of the cabanas at Silver Gull Beach Club.

That night, a six-alarm fire arose at 1-73 Ocean Avenue. Local volunteer firefighters were trapped in place for several hours due to the flooding. Once the waters receded, the Rockaway Point Fire Department rescued more than 41 civilians, while the New York City, Point Breeze, and Roxbury Fire Departments found 130 homes burned to the ground. Nearby, another 50 homes were damaged by the fire. According to an official report in December, rising seawater caused the fire by contacting a house's electrical wires.

=== Historical note ===
A New York Times 1940 headline said: New Coast Guard Station: Work starts on $119,975 unit on Rockaway Point In actuality, this marked work on what was named "Station Rockaway Point, New York". Closure was announced May 2003.

== Ecology ==
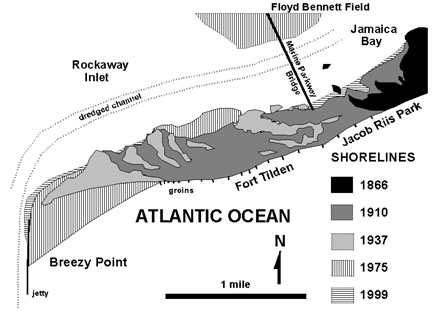
U.S. Geological Survey Image of Breezy Point and the surrounding area

According to the United States Fish and Wildlife Service, beaches on the Breezy Point peninsula are home to one of the most diverse breeding shorebird areas in the Metropolitan area. Shorebirds that breed here include:

- The piping plover, federally designated as threatened
- The Migratory Bird Treaty Act-protected American oystercatcher
- The New York State Species of Special Concern, black skimmer
- The common tern, designated threatened in New York State
- The least tern, designated threatened in New York State

The beaches in Breezy Point Tip are owned by the federal government and are federally and state-protected areas in which development is extremely limited. The beaches in Breezy Point are owned by the Breezy Point Cooperative as a consequence of litigation with the federal government in the 1980s.

== Education ==
Breezy Point residents are zoned for schools in the New York City Department of Education, which operates PS/MS 114 Belle Harbor School for grades K-8.

== Notable residents ==
Notable current and former residents of Breezy Point include:

- Hugh Carey (1919–2011), 51st Governor of New York, was a resident during the time he served in Congress.
- Harry J. Donnelly (1922–1989), politician who served two terms in the New York State Assembly.
- Charles Hynes (1935–2019), district attorney of Kings County, New York from 1990 until 2013.
- Brian McNamee (born c. 1967), former strength and conditioning coach for the New York Yankees and Toronto Blue Jays
- Jimmy Ring (1895–1965), Major League Baseball player
- Daniel T. Scannell (1912–2000), attorney and business executive who held numerous positions in New York's Metropolitan Transportation Authority.
- Bob Turner (born 1941), businessman and politician who served as the United States representative for New York's 9th congressional district from 2011 to 2013.

== Similar places ==
- Sea Gate, Brooklyn- A fully gated community
- Forest Hills, Queens- Another neighborhood with private security
- Fieldston, Bronx- Another private neighborhood
