= Queens Community Board 4 =

Queens Community District 4 Queens Community Board 4
- Community District
- Country: United States
- State: New York
- City: New York City
- Borough: Queens
- Neighborhoods: list: Corona; Elmhurst; LeFrak City

Government
  - Type: Community board
  - Body: Queens Community Board 4
  - Chairperson: Marialena Giampino
  - District Manager: Christian Cassagnol

Area
  - Total: 2.4 sq mi (6.2 km^{2})

Population (2016)
  - Total: 142,289
  - Density: 59,000/sq mi (23,000/km^{2})

Ethnicity
  - African-American: 7.9%
  - Asian: 33.2%
  - Hispanic and Latino Americans: 50.7%
  - White: 6.3%
  - Others: 1.9%
- Time zone: UTC−5 (Eastern)
  - Summer (DST): UTC−4 (EDT)
- ZIP codes: 11368, 11373, and 11377
- Area codes: 718, 347, and 929, and 917
- Police Precincts: 110th (website)
- Website: www1.nyc.gov/site/queenscb4/index.page

The Queens Community Board 4 is a local government in the New York City borough of Queens, encompassing the neighborhoods of Elmhurst, Corona, Corona Heights, Newtown, and also includes LeFrak City, Queens Center Mall and Flushing Meadows-Corona Park. It is delimited by Roosevelt Avenue to the north, the New York Connecting Railroad to the west, the Horace Harding Expressway to the south and Flushing Meadows Corona Park on the east.
