= List of Manhattan neighborhoods =

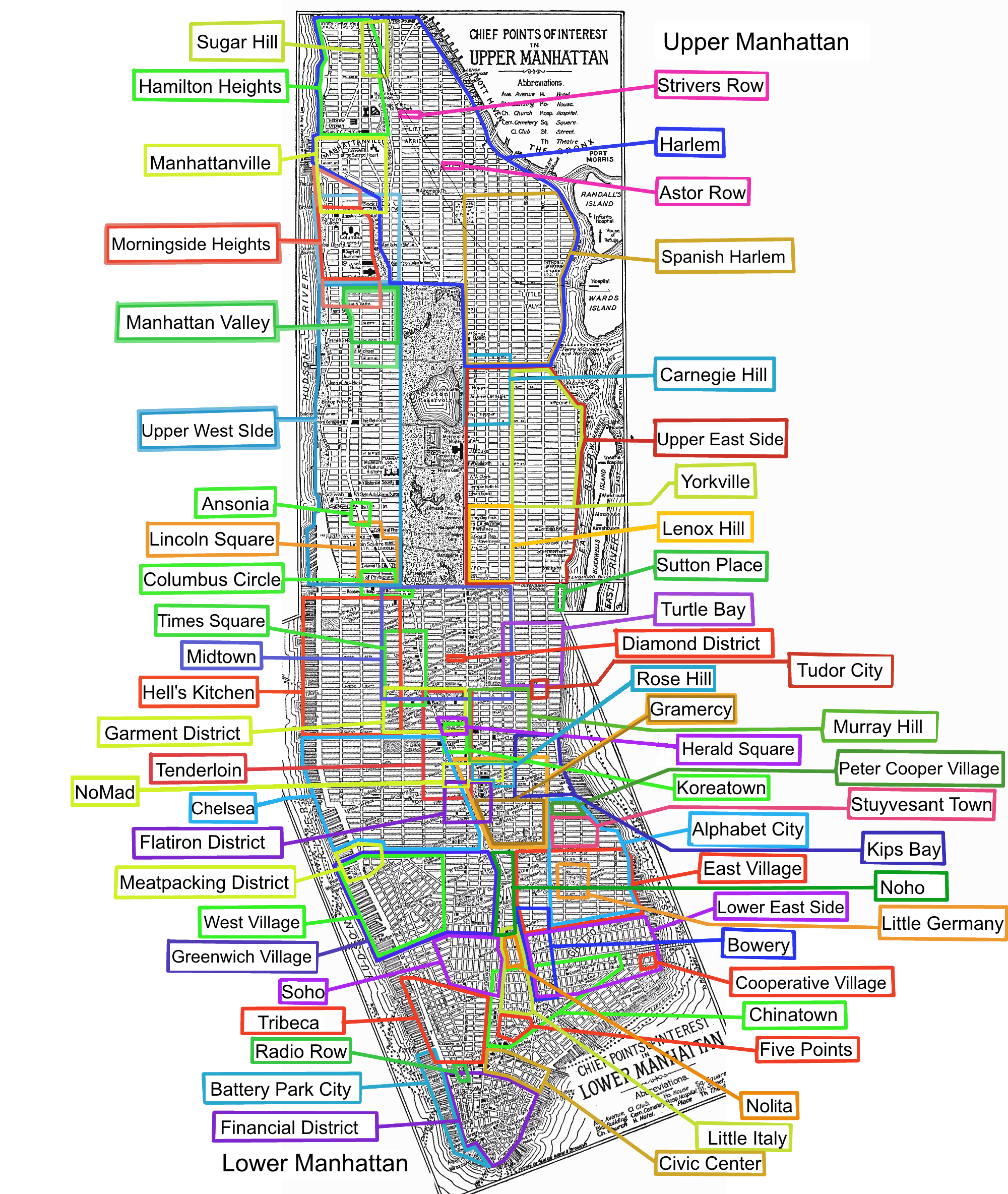
Approximate locations of some past and present Manhattan neighborhoods

This is a list of neighborhoods in the New York City borough of Manhattan arranged geographically from the north of the island to the south.

These approximate definitions are used:

- Upper Manhattan is the area above 96th Street.
- Midtown Manhattan is the area between 34th Street and 59th Street.
- Lower Manhattan is the area below 14th Street.
- West Side is the area west of Fifth Avenue; East Side is the area east of Fifth Avenue.

Neighborhood names and boundaries are not officially defined. They may vary or change from time to time due to demographic and economic variables.

== Uptown neighborhoods ==
Name of the neighborhood	Limits south to north and east to west
Upper Manhattan	Above 96th Street
Marble Hill MN01 (Note: MN = Manhattan Neighborhood Number)	The neighborhood is located across the Harlem River from Manhattan Island and has been connected to The Bronx and the rest of the North American mainland since 1914, when the former course of the Spuyten Duyvil Creek was filled in.
Inwood MN02	Above Dyckman Street
Fort George (part of Washington Heights)	East of Broadway between West 181st Street and Dyckman Street
Washington Heights MN35 & 36	West 155th Street to Dyckman Street
Hudson Heights (part of Washington Heights)	West 181st Street to Fort Tryon Park west of Broadway
West Harlem	West 125th to West 155th Streets; St. Nicholas Avenue to Broadway
Hamilton Heights (part of Harlem) (MN04	West 135th to West 155th streets; Broadway to the Hudson River
Manhattanville MN06	West 125th to West 135th streets; St. Nicholas Avenue to the Hudson River
Morningside Heights MN09	West 110th to West 125th streets; Morningside to Riverside drives
Central Harlem MN03 & 11	110th to 155th streets; Park to St. Nicholas avenues
Harlem	96th to 141st Streets (east), 110th to 155th streets (central), 125th to 155th streets (west)
St. Nicholas Historic District, aka Strivers' Row (Central Harlem)	West 137th to West 138th Streets; 7th to 8th avenues
Astor Row (Central Harlem)	Centered at West 130th Street
Sugar Hill (Central Harlem)	West 145th to West 155th streets; Edgecombe to Amsterdam avenues
Marcus Garvey Park, Mount Morris Historical District	120th to 124th Streets; Madison to 5th avenues
Le Petit Senegal (Little Senegal)	116th Street east of Morningside Park
East Harlem (Spanish Harlem) MN33 & 34	96th to 141st streets; the East River to 5th Avenue
Upper East Side MN40	East 59th to 96th streets; the East River to 5th Avenue (and 96th to 110th streets along 5th Avenue)
Lenox Hill MN31	60th to 77th streets; the East River to Park Avenue
Carnegie Hill	86th to 98th streets; 3rd to 5th avenues (centered at East 91st Street and Park Avenue)
Yorkville MN32	East 79th to East 96th streets; the East River to 3rd Avenue (centered at East 86th Street and 3rd Avenue)
Upper West Side MN12	West 59th to West 110th streets; Central Park West to the Hudson River
Manhattan Valley, Bloomingdale District	West 96th to West 110th streets; Central Park West to Broadway
Lincoln Square MN14 (once San Juan Hill)	West 59th to West 66th streets; Columbus Avenue to Broadway

== Midtown neighborhoods ==
Name of the neighborhood	Limits south to north and east to west
Columbus Circle	West 59th Street and 8th Avenue
Sutton Place	East 53rd to East 59th streets; 1st Avenue to Sutton Place
Rockefeller Center	49th to 51st streets; 5th to 6th avenues
Diamond District	47th Street from 5th to 6th avenues
Theater District	West 42nd to West 53rd streets; 6th to 8th avenues
Turtle Bay MN19	East 42nd to East 53rd streets; East River to Lexington Avenue
Midtown East	East 42nd to East 59th streets; East River to 5th Avenue
Midtown MN17	40th to 59th streets; 3rd to 9th avenues
Tudor City	East 40th to East 43rd streets; 1st to 2nd avenues
Little Brazil	46th Street from 5th to 6th avenues
Times Square	West 39th to West 52nd streets; 7th to 9th avenues
Hudson Yards MN13	West 28th to West 40th Streets; 9th Avenue to the Hudson River
Midtown West	West 34th to West 59th streets; 5th Avenue to the Hudson River
Hell's Kitchen (Clinton) MN15	West 34th to West 59th streets; 8th Avenue to the Hudson River
Garment District	34th to 42nd streets and 5th to 9th avenues
Herald Square	West 34th Street and 6th Avenue
Koreatown	31st to 36th streets; 5th to 6th avenues
Murray Hill aka Curry Hill aka Little India MN20 (former Little Armenia)	East 34th to East 40th streets; 3rd to Madison avenues
Tenderloin	23rd Street to 42nd streets; 5th to 7th avenues
Madison Square	West 23rd to West 26th streets; 5th Avenue to Broadway

== Between Midtown and Lower Manhattan ==
Name of the neighborhood	Limits south to north and east to west
Flower District	26th to 28th Streets; 6th to 7th avenues
Brookdale	East 25th Street from FDR Drive to 1st Avenue
Kips Bay	East 23rd to 34th streets; the East River to 3rd Avenue
Rose Hill	Between Murray Hill to the north and Gramercy Park to the south
NoMad	East 25th Street to East 29th Street; Madison Avenue to 6th Avenue
Peter Cooper Village^{†} (former Gas House district)	East 20th to East 23rd streets; Avenue C to 1st Avenue
Chelsea	West 14th to West 34th Streets; 6th Avenue to the Hudson River
Flatiron District, Toy District, Photo District	16th to 27th streets; Park Avenue South to 6th Avenue
Gramercy Park MN21	East 14th to East 23rd streets; 1st Avenue to Park Avenue South
Stuyvesant Square	15th to 18th streets; 1st to 3rd avenues
Union Square	East 14th to East 17th Streets; 4th Avenue to University Place
Stuyvesant Town^{†} MN50 (former Gas House district)	East 14th to East 20th streets; Avenue C to 1st Avenue
Meatpacking District	Horatio to West 15th streets; Hudson Street to the Hudson River
Waterside Plaza	East 25th to East 29th streets; the East River to FDR Drive

^{†} Large scale developments

== Lower Manhattan neighborhoods ==
Name of the neighborhood	Limits south to north and east to west
Lower Manhattan	Below 14th Street
Little Germany (historic)	East 7th to East 10th streets; avenues A to B
Alphabet City and Loisaida	East Houston to East 14th streets; the Hudson River to Avenue A
East Village MN22	East Houston to East 14th streets; the East River to the Bowery
Greenwich Village	West Houston to West 14th streets; Broadway to the Hudson River
NoHo	East Houston Street to Astor Place; the Bowery to Broadway
Bowery	Canal to East 4th streets; the Bowery
West Village MN23	West Houston to West 14th streets; 6th Avenue (or 7th Avenue) to the Hudson River
Lower East Side MN28	Canal to East Houston streets; the East River to the Bowery
SoHo MN24	Canal to West Houston streets; Lafayette to Varick streets
Nolita (NoLIta)	Broome to Houston streets; the Bowery to Lafayette Street
Little Australia	Mulberry Street and Mott Street in Nolita
Little Italy	Mulberry Street from Canal to Broome streets
Chinatown MN27	Chambers to Delancey streets; East Broadway to Broadway
Financial District	Below Chambers Street
Five Points (historic)	Worth and Baxter streets
Cooperative Village^{†}	Frankfort to Grand streets; FDR Drive to East Broadway
Two Bridges	Brooklyn Bridge to Montgomery Street; St. James Place to the East River
Tribeca (TriBeCa)	Vesey Street to Canal Street; Broadway to the Hudson River
Civic Center	Vesey to Chambers streets; the East River to Broadway
Radio Row (historic)	Greenwich Street from Cortlandt to Dey streets (World Trade Center site)
South Street Seaport (historic)	South of Fulton Street and along the FDR Drive
Battery Park City MN25^{†}	West of West Street
Hudson Square	West
Little Syria (historic)	Washington Street from Battery Park to above Rector Street

^{†} Large scale developments

== Islands ==
- Ellis Island
- Governors Island
- Liberty Island
- Randalls and Wards Islands
- Roosevelt Island

== See also ==
- Neighborhoods in New York City
- List of Bronx neighborhoods
- List of Brooklyn neighborhoods
- List of Queens neighborhoods
- List of Staten Island neighborhoods
- Tin Pan Alley (Location)
