= Bayswater Point State Park =

Public park in Queens, New York

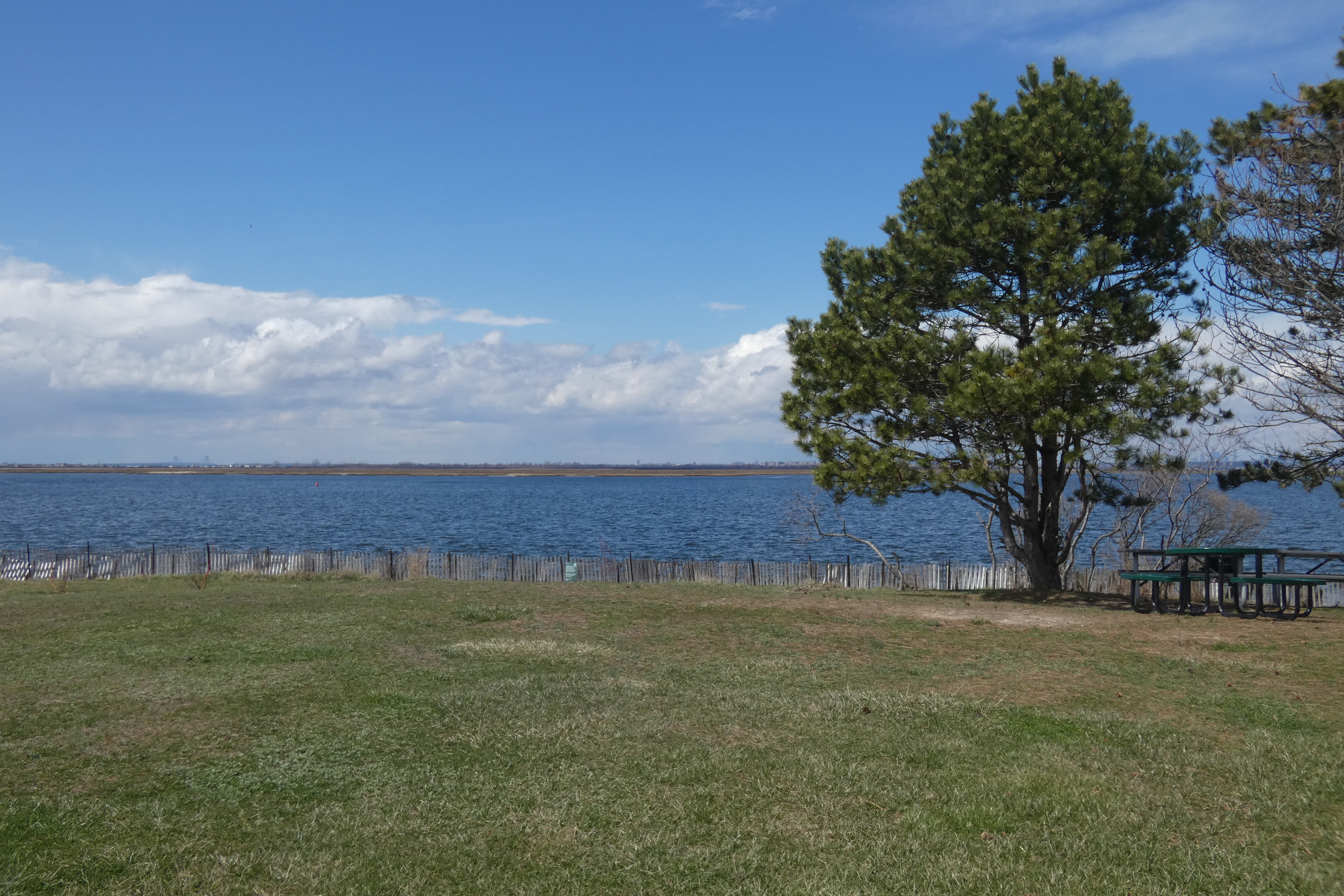
- View from park

- Location within New York City Location within New York Location within the United States
- Interactive map of Bayswater Point State Park
- Type: State park
- Location: 1479 Point Breeze Place; Far Rockaway, New York
- Nearest city: Queens, New York
- Coordinates: 40°37′N 73°46′W
- Area: 17 acres (0.069 km^{2})
- Created: 1991
- Operator: New York State Office of Parks, Recreation and Historic Preservation
- Visitors: 12,620 (in 2020)
- Open: All year
- Website: Bayswater Point State Park

Bayswater Point State Park is a 17-acre (0.069 km^{2}) state park located on Jamaica Bay in Queens, New York. The park is located at the western end of Mott Avenue in Bayswater near Far Rockaway and is built on land that once housed the mansion and estate of banker Louis A. Heinsheimer.

== History ==
The site of Bayswater Point State Park once contained Breezy Point, an expansive mansion built in 1907 by New York City banker Louis A. Heinsheimer. In 1925, the mansion was converted into a home for disabled children, and it was later used as a home for children with intellectual disabilities before being placed for sale in the late 1980s.

A 12-acre (0.049 km^{2}) parcel that was to become Bayswater Point State Park was purchased by the Trust for Public Land in 1986. The mansion, which by that point had been damaged by fire, was demolished in 1987 prior to the land being given to New York State in 1988; only the conservatory was left standing.

New York State designated the land as a state park in 1991, and gave New York City Audubon administrative duties over the park. Between 1994 and 1996, the Audubon Society conducted a research and restoration project at Bayswater Point, seeking to engage the public with the land's conservation.

In early May 2010, the park was briefly closed to the public as a result of budget cuts, along with 57 additional state parks and historic sites. However, by month's end an agreement had been reached to re-open many of the parks, including Bayswater Point. In 2015, an $80,000 improvement project to stabilize Sunset Lodge at the park was announced.

== Usage ==
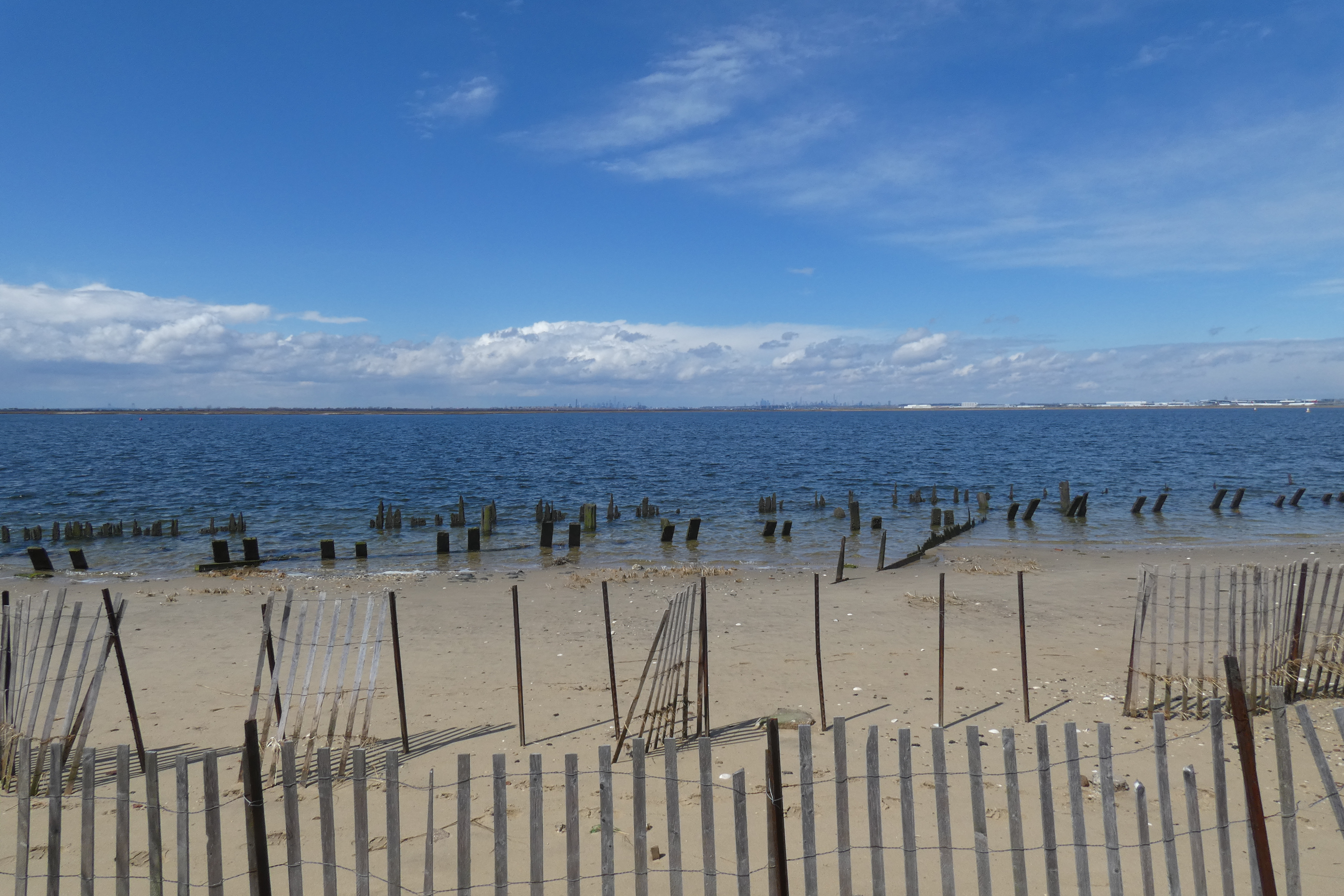
Beach at park

Bayswater Point State Park was established in order to preserve important habitat for migratory birds in Jamaica Bay. The park also protects habitat for butterflies such as the Delaware skipper, and its beach is used by horseshoe crabs during their annual mating season. As such, the park is largely undeveloped, and primarily offers space for passive recreation such as hiking, birdwatching, and fishing.

== See also ==
- List of New York state parks
