= Bay Terrace, Queens =

Neighborhood in New York City

Bay Terrace
- Neighborhood of Queens
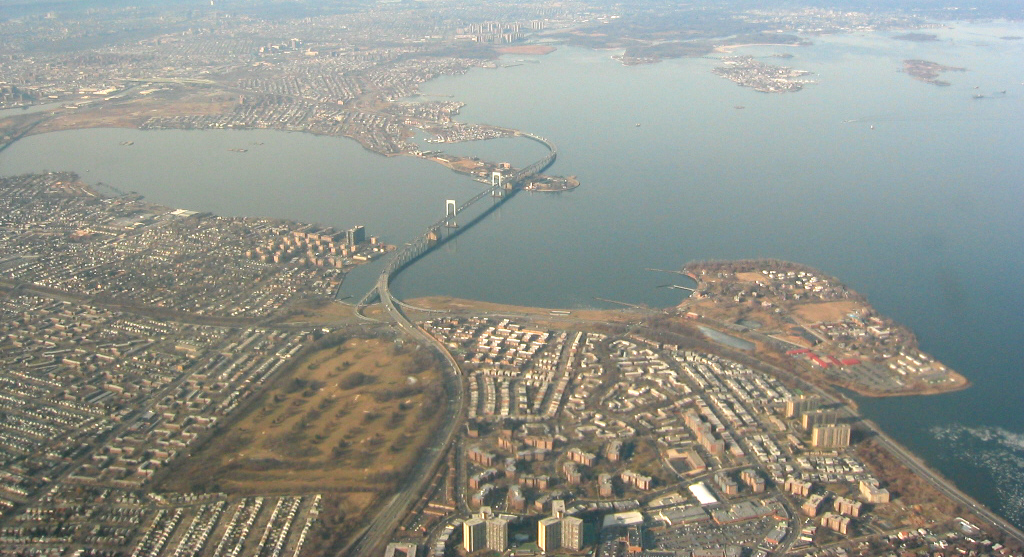
- Aerial view of Bay Terrace, with the Throgs Neck Bridge crossing the East River to the north
- Interactive map of Bay Terrace
- Coordinates: 40.783°N 73.781°W
- Country: United States
- State: New York
- City: New York City
- County/Borough: Queens
- Community District: Queens 7

Population (2010 United States census)
  - Total: 21,751

Ethnicity
  - White: 68.4%
  - Asian: 20.4%
  - Hispanic: 8.5%
  - Black: 1.3%
  - Other: 1.3%

Economics
  - Median income: $51,284
- Time zone: UTC−5 (EST)
  - Summer (DST): UTC−4 (EDT)
- ZIP Codes: 11359, 11360
- Area codes: 718, 347, 929, and 917

Bay Terrace is a neighborhood in the northeastern section of the New York City borough of Queens. It is often considered part of the larger area of Bayside. Bay Terrace overlooks the East River and the approaches to the Throgs Neck Bridge from the Clearview Expressway and Cross Island Parkway. It is bounded on the west by the Clearview Expressway, on the south by 26th and 28th Avenues, to the east by the Little Neck Bay, and to the north by the East River.

Bay Terrace is located in Queens Community District 7 and its ZIP Code is 11360. It is patrolled by the New York City Police Department's 109th Precinct. Politically, Bay Terrace is represented by the New York City Council's 19th District.

== History ==
In 1639, Dutch Governor Willem Kieft (1597–1647) purchased the land that today encompasses Queens County from the Matinecock. William Lawrence (1622–1680), who served as a magistrate under Dutch and English administrations, was granted a parcel of land by King Charles II in 1645 that included a large portion of what is today Bayside, in addition to College Point, Whitestone, and Fort Totten. Bayside began its course of development from an agricultural community to a suburb when the North Shore Railroad was extended in 1866. During the following several decades, the Bayside Land Association purchased farms for development. Bay Terrace, originally included within the bounds of Bayside, remained composed of farms and large estates until the 1950s, when Cord and Charles Meyer sold their 225-acre (0.91 km^{2}) farm for development.

The construction of the Bay Terrace Cooperative apartment buildings and garden apartments in the 1950s, as well as the development of the Bay Terrace Shopping Center, lent the area its own identity. The area encompasses gated cooperative/condominium developments such as the Bay Club and Baybridge Condos. Other cooperative/condominium developments include the Towers at Waters Edge, the Kennedy Street Quad, the Bayside Townhouse Condominiums, Bay Country Owners, Bell Owners and others. The gated estate community of the "Bayside Gables" is also located within the Bay Terrace neighborhood, being the site of some of the only single family homes in the area.

The New York City Department of City Planning conducted a transportation study of Bay Terrace in 2004. Findings included parking and intersection issues, including poor access to the Cross Island Parkway. The study found that a median needed to be constructed along the length of 212th Street, with increased access to the Cross Island Parkway near the Baybridge Commons Shopping Center and reconstruction of the existing entrance and exit ramps. The Bay Terrace at Bayside shopping center planned on adding new storefronts to their plaza. including World Kitchen; Aéropostale; and PM Pediatrics, a pediatric emergency care facility.

== Demographics ==
For census purposes, the New York City government classifies Bay Terrace as part of a larger neighborhood tabulation area called Fort Totten–Bay Terrace–Clearview. Based on data from the 2010 United States census, the population of Fort Totten–Bay Terrace–Clearview was 21,751, a change of -980 (-4.5%) from the 22,731 counted in 2000. Covering an area of 1,071.49 acres (433.62 ha), the neighborhood had a population density of 20.3 inhabitants per acre (13,000/sq mi; 5,000/km^{2}).

The racial makeup of the neighborhood was 68.4% (14,879) White, 1.3% (283) African American, 0.1% (12) Native American, 20.4% (4,446) Asian, 0% (1) Pacific Islander, 0.1% (29) from other races, and 1.1% (246) from two or more races. Hispanic or Latino of any race were 8.5% (1,855) of the population.

The entirety of Community Board 7, which comprises Bay Terrace, Flushing, College Point, and Whitestone, had 263,039 inhabitants as of NYC Health's 2018 Community Health Profile, with an average life expectancy of 84.3 years. This is longer than the median life expectancy of 81.2 for all New York City neighborhoods. Most inhabitants are middle-aged and elderly: 22% are between the ages of between 25 and 44, 30% between 45 and 64, and 18% over 65. The ratio of youth and college-aged residents was lower, at 17% and 7% respectively.

As of 2017, the median household income in Community Board 7 was $51,284. In 2018, an estimated 25% of Community Board 7 residents lived in poverty, compared to 19% in all of Queens and 20% in all of New York City. One in seventeen residents (6%) were unemployed, compared to 8% in Queens and 9% in New York City. Rent burden, or the percentage of residents who have difficulty paying their rent, is 57% in Community Board 7, higher than the boroughwide and citywide rates of 53% and 51% respectively. Based on this calculation, as of 2018, Community Board 7 is considered to be high-income relative to the rest of the city and not gentrifying.

== Police and crime ==
Community Board 7 are patrolled by the 109th Precinct of the NYPD, located at 37-05 Union Street. The 109th Precinct ranked 9th safest out of 69 patrol areas for per-capita crime in 2010. As of 2018, with a non-fatal assault rate of 17 per 100,000 people, Community District 7's rate of violent crimes per capita is less than that of the city as a whole. The incarceration rate of 145 per 100,000 people is lower than that of the city as a whole.

The 109th Precinct has a lower crime rate than in the 1990s, with crimes across all categories having decreased by 83.7% between 1990 and 2018. The precinct reported 6 murders, 30 rapes, 202 robberies, 219 felony assaults, 324 burglaries, 970 grand larcenies, and 126 grand larcenies auto in 2018.

== Fire safety ==
Bay Terrace is served by two New York City Fire Department (FDNY) fire stations. Engine Company 306 is located at 40-18 214th Place, while Engine Company 320//Ladder Company 167 is located at 36-18 Francis Lewis Boulevard.

The FDNY EMS Training Academy is located in Bay Terrace at Fort Totten. The site also contains a museum of FDNY EMS history.

== Health ==
As of 2018, preterm births and births to teenage mothers are less common in Community District 7 than in other places citywide. In Community District 7, there were 63 preterm births per 1,000 live births (compared to 87 per 1,000 citywide), and 8 births to teenage mothers per 1,000 live births (compared to 19.3 per 1,000 citywide). Community District 7 have a higher than average population of residents who are uninsured. In 2018, this population of uninsured residents was estimated to be 14%, slightly higher than the citywide rate of 12%.

The concentration of fine particulate matter, the deadliest type of air pollutant, in Community District 7 is 0.0073 milligrams per cubic metre (7.3×10^{−9} oz/ft^{3}), less than the city average. Thirteen percent of Community District 7 residents are smokers, which is lower than the city average of 14% of residents being smokers. In Community District 7, 13% of residents are obese, 8% are diabetic, and 22% have high blood pressure—compared to the citywide averages of 22%, 8%, and 23% respectively. In addition, 15% of children are obese, compared to the citywide average of 20%.

Ninety-five percent of residents eat some fruits and vegetables every day, which is higher than the city's average of 87%. In 2018, 71% of residents described their health as "good", "very good", or "excellent", lower than the city's average of 78%. For every supermarket in Community District 7, there are 6 bodegas.

The nearest major hospitals are Flushing Hospital Medical Center in Flushing and Long Island Jewish Medical Center in Glen Oaks.

== Post office and ZIP Codes ==
Bay Terrace is covered by ZIP Codes 11359 in Fort Totten and 11360 in the rest of the neighborhood. The United States Post Office operates the Bay Terrace Station at 212-71 26th Avenue.

== Parks ==
Bay Terrace is home to scenic waterfront parks and recreational facilities, including Fort Totten; the Bay Terrace Playground; Little Bay Park, at the foot of the Throgs Neck Bridge; and Joe Michael's Mile, along Little Neck Bay next to Cross Island Parkway.

== Education ==
Community District 7 generally has a similar rate of college-educated residents to the rest of the city as of 2018. While 37% of residents age 25 and older have a college education or higher, 23% have less than a high school education and 40% are high school graduates or have some college education. By contrast, 39% of Queens residents and 43% of city residents have a college education or higher. The percentage of Community District 7 students excelling in math rose from 55% in 2000 to 78% in 2011, and reading achievement rose from 57% to 59% during the same time period.

Community District 7's rate of elementary school student absenteeism is less than the rest of New York City. In Community District 7, 9% of elementary school students missed twenty or more days per school year, lower than the citywide average of 20%. Additionally, 86% of high school students in Community District 7 graduate on time, more than the citywide average of 75%.

=== Schools ===
Bay Terrace's public schools are operated by the New York City Department of Education. Bay Terrace contains the following public schools:

- PS 169 Bay Terrace
- IS 25 Adrien Block
- JHS 194 William Carr
- MS 294 Bell Academy
- Bayside High School

=== Libraries ===
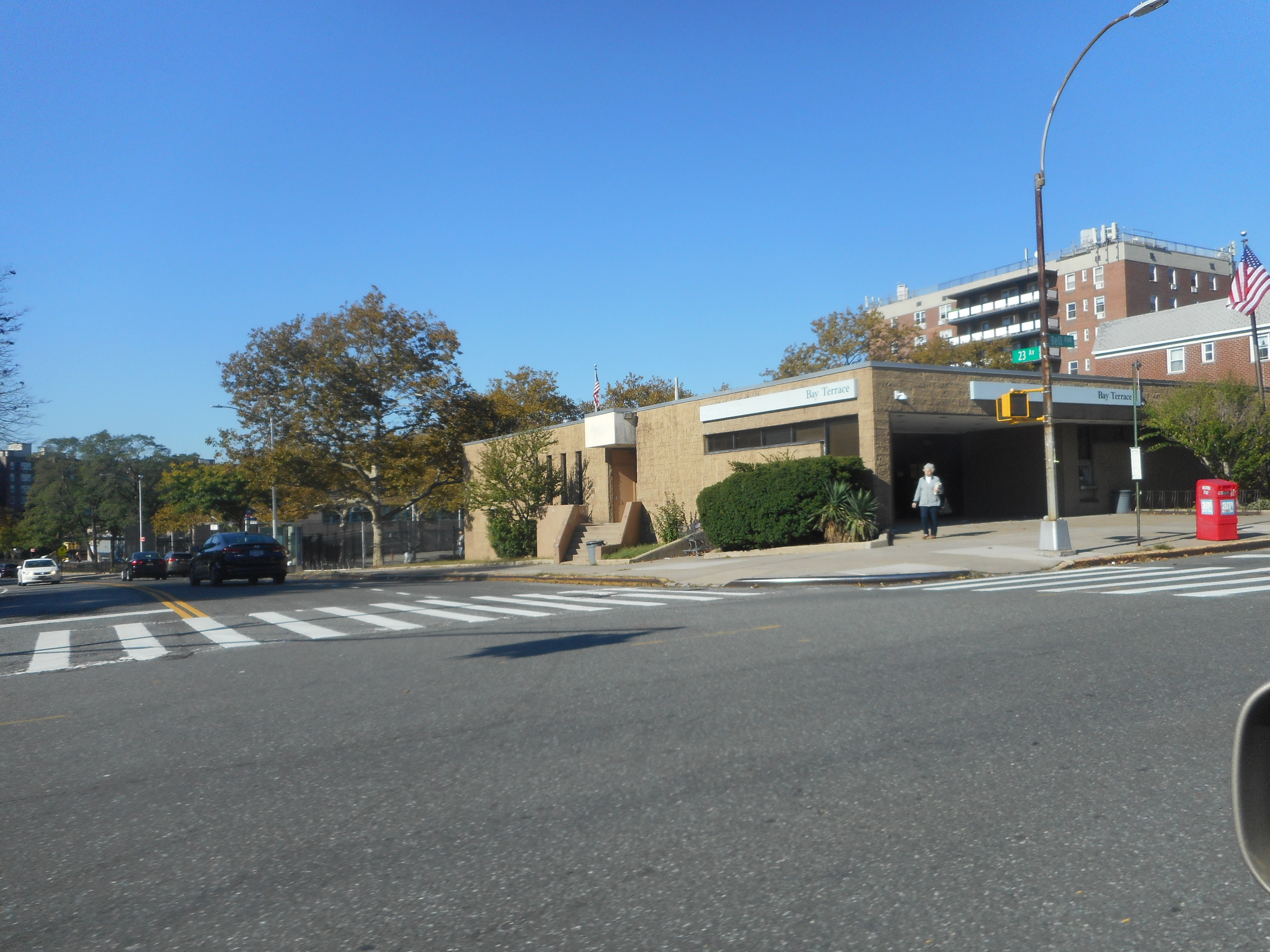
Bay Terrace Branch Queens Public Library on Bell Boulevard and 23rd Avenue

The Queens Public Library's Bay Terrace Branch is located at 18-36 Bell Boulevard.

== Transportation ==
Bay Terrace is served by the New York City Bus's Q13, Q16, Q31 buses and MTA Bus Company's Q28, QM2, QM20, QM32 buses; nearby is also the Bayside station on the Long Island Rail Road's Port Washington Branch.
