= Queens Community Board 7 =

Queens Community District 7 Queens Community Board 7
- Community District
- Country: United States
- State: New York
- City: New York City
- Borough: Queens
- Neighborhoods: list: Bay Terrace, Beechhurst, College Point; Flushing; Malba; Murray Hill; Queensboro; Whitestone; Willets Point

Government
  - Type: Community board
  - Body: Queens Community Board 7
  - Chairperson: Chuck Apelian
  - District Manager: Marilyn McAndrews

Area
  - Total: 11.8 sq mi (31 km^{2})

Population (2016)
  - Total: 250,162
  - Density: 21,200/sq mi (8,190/km^{2})

Ethnicity
  - African-American: 2.1%
  - Asian: 52.1%
  - Hispanic and Latino Americans: 17.6%
  - White: 25.6%
  - Others: 2.5%
- Time zone: UTC−5 (Eastern)
  - Summer (DST): UTC−4 (EDT)
- ZIP codes: 11354, 11355, 11356, 11357, 11358, 11360, and 11367
- Area codes: 718, 347, and 929, and 917
- Police Precincts: 109th (website)
- Website: www1.nyc.gov/site/queenscb7/index.page

The Queens Community Board 7 is a local governmental advisory board in New York City, encompassing the neighborhoods of Flushing, Bay Terrace, College Point, Whitestone, Malba, Murray Hill, Linden Hill, Beechhurst, Queensboro Hill and Willets Point, in the borough of Queens. It is delimited by the Flushing Bay to the west, the East River to the north, Utopia Parkway (south of 24th Avenue) and Little Neck Bay (north of 24th Avenue) on the east, and Reeves Avenue on the south. CB7 is the biggest community board in Queens.

Half of the board's members are appointed by the Queens Borough President, and half are nominated by the New York City Council members who represent the district.

== Demographics ==
As of the 2000 United States census, the community board has a population of 325,500. 84,654 (28.1%) were White non-Hispanic, 20,485 (8.2%) were African-American, 92,399 (58.3%) were Asian or Pacific Islander, 1,856 (2.4%) were American Indian or Native Alaskan, 2,256 (1.0%) were of some other race, 14,458 (6.9%) were of two or more race, and 42,865 (32.4%) were Hispanic.

According to the 2010 Census, Queens Community Board 7 had a population of 247,354. This included White non-Hispanic (73,668 or 29.8%), Black/African American (5,512 or 2.2%), Asian or Pacific Islander (122,094 or 49.4%), American Indian and Alaska Native (215 or 0.1%), and (41,164 or 16.6%) Hispanic.
