= Queens Community Board 14 =

Queens Community District 14
- Community District
- Country: United States
- State: New York
- City: New York City
- Borough: Queens
- Neighborhoods: List: Rockaway; Arverne; Bayswater; Belle Harbor; Breezy Point; Edgemere; Far Rockaway; Neponsit

Government
  - Chairperson: Dolores Orr
  - District Manager: Felicia Johnson

Area
  - Total: 7 sq mi (18 km^{2})

Population (2010)
  - Total: 114,978
  - Density: 16,000/sq mi (6,300/km^{2})

Ethnicity
  - African-American: 35.1%
  - Asian: 3.5%
  - Hispanic and Latino Americans: 24.4%
  - White: 35.1%
  - Others: 2.2%
- Time zone: UTC−5 (Eastern)
  - Summer (DST): UTC−4 (EDT)
- ZIP codes: 11691, 11692, 11694 and 11697
- Area code: 718, 347, 929, and 917
- Police Precincts: 100th (website); 101st (website)
- Website: www1.nyc.gov/site/queenscb14/index.page

The Queens Community Board 14 is a local government in the New York City borough of Queens, encompassing the neighborhoods of Breezy Point, Belle Harbor, Neponsit, Arverne, Bayswater, Edgemere, Rockaway Park, Rockaway and Far Rockaway. It is bounded to the north by Brooklyn and Jamaica Bay, on the east by the Nassau County border, and to the south by the Atlantic Ocean.
