= Community boards of Queens =

New York City political board

Map of community districts in the City of New York

Community boards of Queens are New York City community boards in the borough of Queens, which are the appointed advisory groups of the community districts that advise on land use and zoning, participate in the city budget process, and address service delivery in their district.

Community boards are each composed of up to 50 volunteer members appointed by the local borough president, half from nominations by City Council members representing the community district (i.e., whose council districts cover part of the community district). Additionally, all City Council members representing the community district are non-voting, ex officio board members.

== History ==
The 1963 revision of the New York City Charter extended the borough of Manhattan's "Community Planning Councils" (est. 1951) to the outer boroughs as "Community Planning Boards", which are now known as "Community Boards".

The 1975 revision of the New York City Charter set the number of community districts/boards to 59, established the position of the district manager for the community districts, and created the Uniform Land Use Review Procedure which gave the community boards the authority to review land use proposals such as zoning actions, and special permits.

== Community boards ==
Borough	Borough President (BP)	Number of Districts	Max. number of BP appointees	Max. number of all appointees
Queens	Donovan Richards	14	350	700

The 14 community boards in Queens, and a few representative neighborhoods in each, are listed below:

- Queens Community Board 1 : Astoria, Long Island City, Rikers Island
- Queens Community Board 2 : Sunnyside, Woodside
- Queens Community Board 3 : Jackson Heights, East Elmhurst, North Corona
- Queens Community Board 4 : Elmhurst, Corona
- Queens Community Board 5 : Maspeth, Middle Village, Ridgewood, Glendale
- Queens Community Board 6 : Rego Park, Forest Hills
- Queens Community Board 7 : Flushing, Whitestone, College Point
- Queens Community Board 8 : Fresh Meadows, Kew Gardens Hills, Jamaica Hills
- Queens Community Board 9 : Woodhaven, Richmond Hill, Ozone Park, Kew Gardens
- Queens Community Board 10 : Howard Beach, South Ozone Park, Ozone Park,
- Queens Community Board 11 : Bayside, Douglaston, Little Neck, Auburndale
- Queens Community Board 12 : Jamaica, South Jamaica, Hollis, St. Albans
- Queens Community Board 13 : Laurelton, Cambria Heights, Queens Village, Glen Oaks
- Queens Community Board 14 : The Rockaways, Broad Channel

== Other areas ==
Within the borough of Queens there are five joint interest areas (JIA), which are outside of the jurisdiction of individual community districts, and have their own district number. The five JIAs in Queens county are:

- District 80 - LaGuardia Airport, 2010 Census population: Zero
- District 81 - Flushing Meadows-Corona Park, 2010 Census population: 56
- District 82 - Forest Park, 2010 Census population: 691
- District 83 - JFK International Airport, 2010 Census population: Zero
- District 84 - Queens Gateway National Recreation Area, 2010 Census population: 45

Rikers Island, while legally a part of The Bronx, is represented by Queens Community Board 1.

== Queens Borough Board ==
The Queens Borough Board is composed of the borough president, New York City Council members whose districts are part of the borough, and the chairperson of each community board in Queens. The current borough board is composed of the 30 members listed in the table below:

Queens Borough Board
Area	Title	Member name	Notes
Borough of Queens	Borough President	Donovan Richards	
Queens Community District 1	Chairperson	Evie Hantzopoulos	
Queens Community District 2	Chairperson	Anatole Ashraf	
Queens Community District 3	Chairperson	Edmund Rosenbaum	
Queens Community District 4	Chairperson	Marialena Giampino	
Queens Community District 5	Chairperson	Vincent Arcuri Jr.	
Queens Community District 6	Chairperson	Heather Beers-Dimitriadis	
Queens Community District 7	Chairperson	Chuck Apelian	
Queens Community District 8	Chairperson	Martha Taylor	
Queens Community District 9	Chairperson	Sherry Algredo	
Queens Community District 10	Chairperson	Betty Braton	
Queens Community District 11	Chairperson	Paul DiBenedetto	
Queens Community District 12	Chairperson	Carlene O. Thorbs	
Queens Community District 13	Chairperson	Bryan Block	
Queens Community District 14	Chairperson	Dolores Orr	
City Council District 19	Council member	Vickie Paladino	
City Council District 20	Council member	Sandra Ung	
City Council District 21	Council member	Francisco Moya	
City Council District 22	Council member	Tiffany Cabán	
City Council District 23	Council member	Linda Lee	
City Council District 24	Council member	James Gennaro	
City Council District 25	Council member	Shekar Krishnan	
City Council District 26	Council member	Julie Won	
City Council District 27	Council member	Nantasha Williams	
City Council District 28	Council member	Adrienne Adams	
City Council District 29	Council member	Lynn Schulman	
City Council District 30	Council member	Robert Holden	
City Council District 31	Council member	Selvena Brooks-Powers	
City Council District 32	Council member	Joann Ariola	
City Council District 34	Council member	Jennifer Gutiérrez	Also member of the Brooklyn Borough Board

== Notable members ==
- Adrienne Adams (Queens CB12)
- Tony Avella (Queens CB7)
- Edward Braunstein (Queens CB11)
- Robert Holden (Queens CB5)
- Bill Kresse (Queens CB3)
- Peter Koo (Queens CB7)
- Michael G. Miller (Queens CB4)
- Jessica Ramos (Queens CB3)
- Claire Shulman
- Julie Won (Queens CB2)

== See also ==
- Government of New York City
- List of Queens neighborhoods
- New York City Council
- Borough president
- Borough boards of New York City
