= List of Queens neighborhoods =

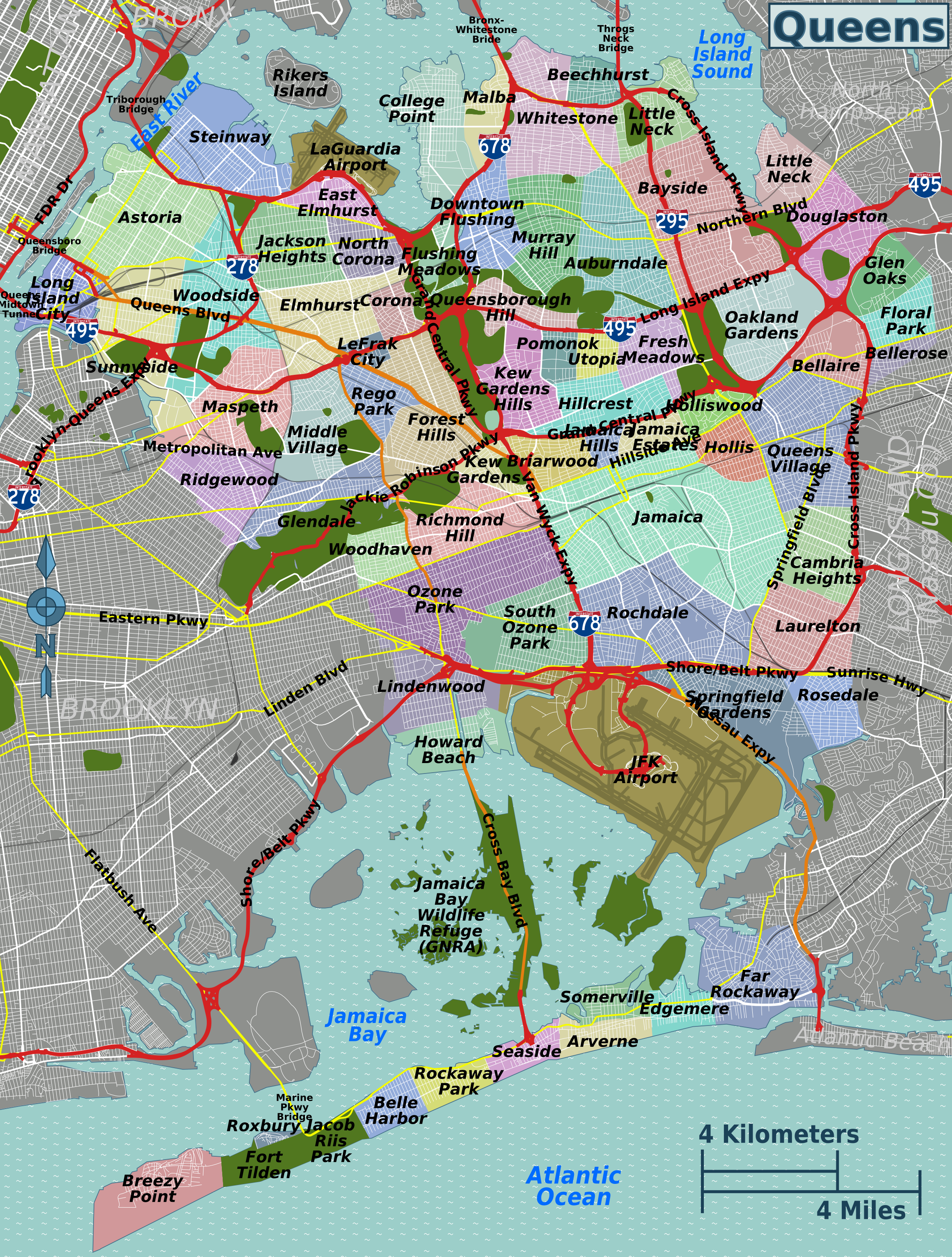
A map of Queens neighborhoods.

This is a list of neighborhoods in Queens. Queens is one of the five boroughs of New York City in the U.S. state of New York.

== Northwestern Queens ==
- Astoria
  - Astoria Heights
  - Ditmars
    - Steinway
  - Little Egypt
- Long Island City
  - Blissville
  - Hunters Point
  - Dutch Kills
  - Queensbridge (housing development)
  - Queensview (housing development)
  - Queens West
  - Ravenswood (housing development)
- Sunnyside
  - Sunnyside Gardens
- Woodside
  - Little Manila
  - Boulevard Gardens
- Willets Point

== Southwestern Queens ==
- The Hole
- Howard Beach
  - Hamilton Beach
  - Howard Park
  - Lindenwood (housing development)
  - Old Howard Beach
  - Ramblersville
  - Rockwood Park
- Ozone Park
  - South Ozone Park
  - Tudor Village
- Richmond Hill
- Woodhaven

== Central Queens ==
- Briarwood
- Corona
  - LeFrak City (housing development)
  - North Corona
- East Elmhurst
  - LaGuardia Airport
  - Landing Lights
  - Astoria Heights
  - North Beach
- Elmhurst
- Forest Hills
  - Forest Hills Gardens
- Fresh Pond
- Glendale
- Jackson Heights
- Kew Gardens
- Maspeth
- Middle Village
- Rego Park
- Ridgewood
  - Wyckoff Heights

== Northeastern Queens ==
- Bayside
  - Bay Terrace
  - Bayside Hills
  - Fort Totten
  - Oakland Gardens
- Bellerose
- College Point
- Douglaston–Little Neck
  - Douglaston
    - Douglas Bay
    - Douglas Manor
    - Douglaston Hill
    - Douglaston Park
    - Winchester Estates
  - Little Neck
    - Pines
    - Little Neck Hills
    - Westmoreland
- Flushing
  - Broadway–Flushing
  - Bowne Park
  - Chinatown
  - Downtown Flushing
  - Koreatown
  - Linden Hill
  - Murray Hill
  - Willets Point
  - Pomonok
  - Queensboro Hill
- Floral Park
- Auburndale
- Kew Gardens Hills
  - Parkway Village
  - Pomonok
- Fresh Meadows
  - Hillcrest
  - Utopia
- Glen Oaks
  - North Shore Towers (housing development)
- Whitestone
  - Beechhurst
  - Clearview
  - Malba

== Southeastern Queens ==
- Bellaire
- Brookville
- Cambria Heights
- Hollis
  - Hollis Hills
  - Holliswood
- Jamaica
  - Jamaica Estates
  - Jamaica Hills
  - South Jamaica
  - Rochdale Village (Cooperative Housing Development)
  - St. Albans
- Laurelton
- Queens Village
- Rosedale
  - Meadowmere
  - Warnerville
- Springfield Gardens

== The Rockaways ==
- Arverne
- Bayswater
- Belle Harbor
- Breezy Point
- Broad Channel
- Edgemere
- Far Rockaway
- Hammels
- Neponsit
- Rockaway Beach
- Rockaway Park
- Roxbury
- Seaside

== Postal mail, ZIP Codes, and neighborhoods ==
Unlike neighborhoods in the other four boroughs, some Queens neighborhood names are used as the town name in postal addresses. For example, whereas the town, state construction for all addresses in Manhattan is New York, New York (except in Marble Hill, where Bronx, New York is used), and all neighborhoods in Brooklyn use Brooklyn, New York, residents of College Point would use the construction College Point, New York or Flushing, New York instead of Queens, New York.

From the time of the inception of the ZIP Code system until 1998, the postal zones of Queens and western Nassau County—whose secession from Queens County in 1899 did not affect postal routes—were organized based on which main post office routed the neighborhood's postal mail. The name of the main post office was the default name of the corresponding ZIP Code. For example, Fresh Meadows postal mail was routed through the main post office in Flushing, and Fresh Meadows' ZIP Codes 11365 and 11366 were both labeled as "Flushing".

At the urging of the citizens of Queens and with the support of Congressman Gary Ackerman, ZIP Codes are also named after the main post office they serve. The original ZIP Codes themselves are still used by the USPS for mail delivery purposes. Queens neighborhoods may have one of the following ZIP Code prefixes, which are classified under the following main post offices:

- 111: Long Island City
- 113: Flushing
- 114: Jamaica
- 116: Rockaway

== See also ==
- List of Bronx neighborhoods
- List of Brooklyn neighborhoods
- List of Manhattan neighborhoods
- List of Staten Island neighborhoods
- Community boards of Queens
