= Whitestone, Queens =

Neighborhood in New York City

Whitestone
- Neighborhood of Queens
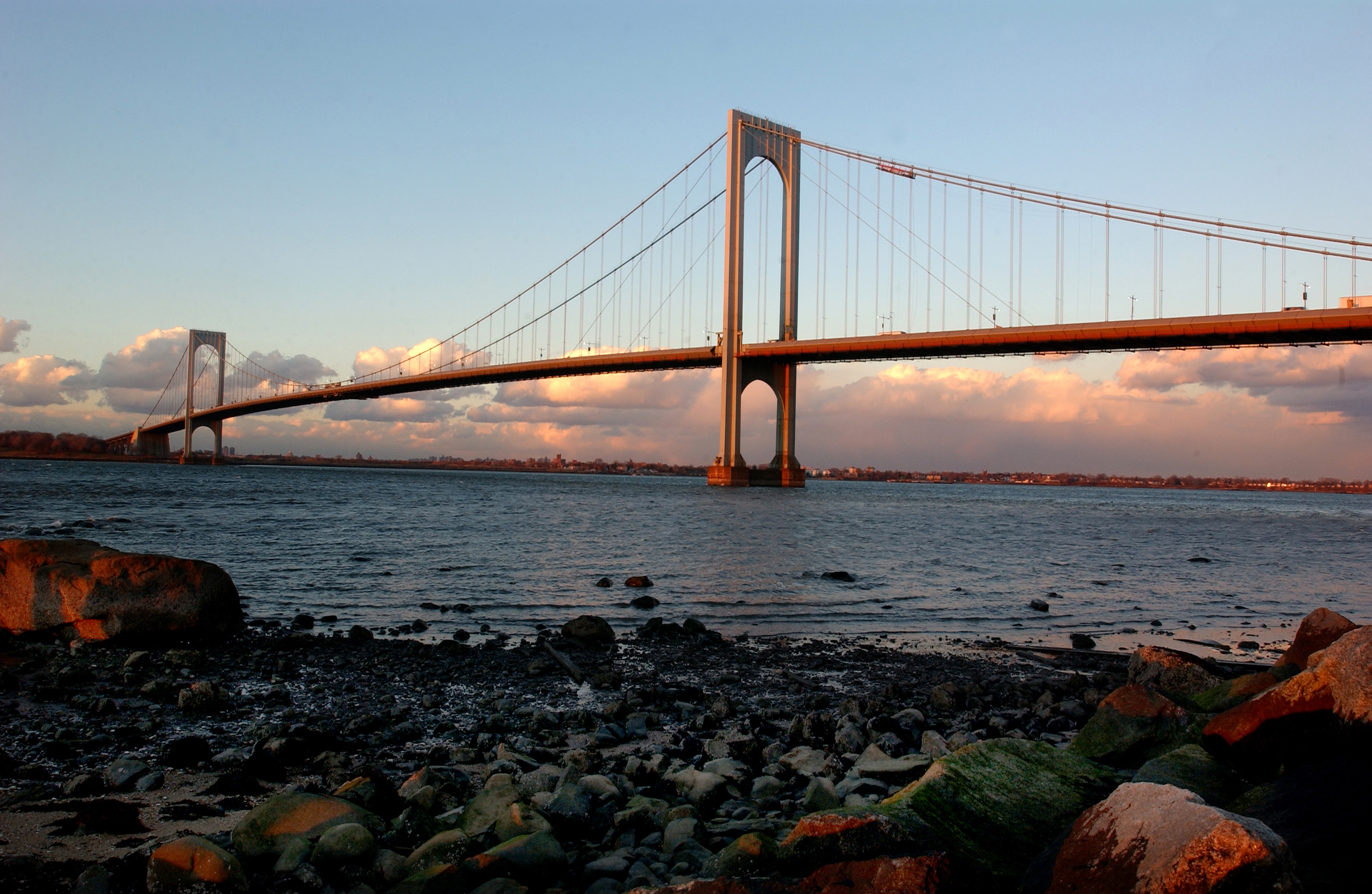
- The Bronx–Whitestone Bridge as seen from Whitestone
- Location within New York City
- Coordinates: 40.79°N 73.81°W
- Country: United States
- State: New York
- City: New York City
- County/Borough: Queens
- Community District: Queens 7
- Council District: 19th
- Demonym(s): Whitestoner, Whitestonian
- Time zone: UTC−05:00 (Eastern)
  - Summer (DST): UTC−04:00 (EDT)
- ZIP Code: 11357
- Area codes: 718, 347, 929, and 917
- Website: www.whitestone.nyc

Whitestone is a residential neighborhood in the northernmost part of the New York City borough of Queens. The neighborhood proper is located between the East River to the north; College Point and Whitestone Expressway to the west; Flushing and 25th Avenue to the south; and Bayside and Francis Lewis Boulevard to the east.

Whitestone contains the subsection of Malba, which is bounded to the north by the East River, to the east by the Whitestone Expressway, to the south by 14th Avenue, and to the west by 138th Street. Malba was cited in a New York Times article as one of the few "elite enclaves" of Queens.

Whitestone is located in Queens Community District 7 and its ZIP Code is 11357. It is patrolled by the New York City Police Department's 109th Precinct. Politically, Whitestone is represented by the New York City Council's 19th District.

== History ==
=== Whitestone ===
Dutch settlers derived the name of the town from limestone that used to lie on the shore of the river according to a popular tradition. This tradition is supported by 17th century wills and deeds, which may be found in The New York Genealogical and Biographical Record, that refer to "the white stone" as a local landmark and survey reference point.

The area was, in large part, the estate of Francis Lewis, a delegate to the Continental Congress and a signer of the Declaration of Independence. The estate was the site of a British raid during the Revolutionary War. Lewis was not present but his wife was taken prisoner and his house was burned to the ground. For a period of time Whitestone was called Clintonville after Dewitt Clinton, the former governor of New York; this etymology is present in the name of Clintonville Street, located in the neighborhood. In the late 19th century, many wealthy New Yorkers began building mansions in the area, on what had once been farmland or woodland. Rapid development of the area ensued in the 1920s, however, as trolley and Long Island Rail Road train service on the Whitestone Branch was expanded into the neighborhood. Although this rail service ended during the Great Depression, part of the right-of-way was later used by Robert Moses to help construct the Belt Parkway, which includes the Whitestone Expressway which runs along the southeast edge of the former Flushing Airport and through Whitestone. Flushing Airport has been abandoned since 1985.

Further development came with the completion of the Bronx–Whitestone Bridge in 1939. The bridge measures 2,300 feet (700 m) at its center span and was the fourth-longest bridge in the world at the time of its construction.

=== Malba subsection ===
Map of Malba

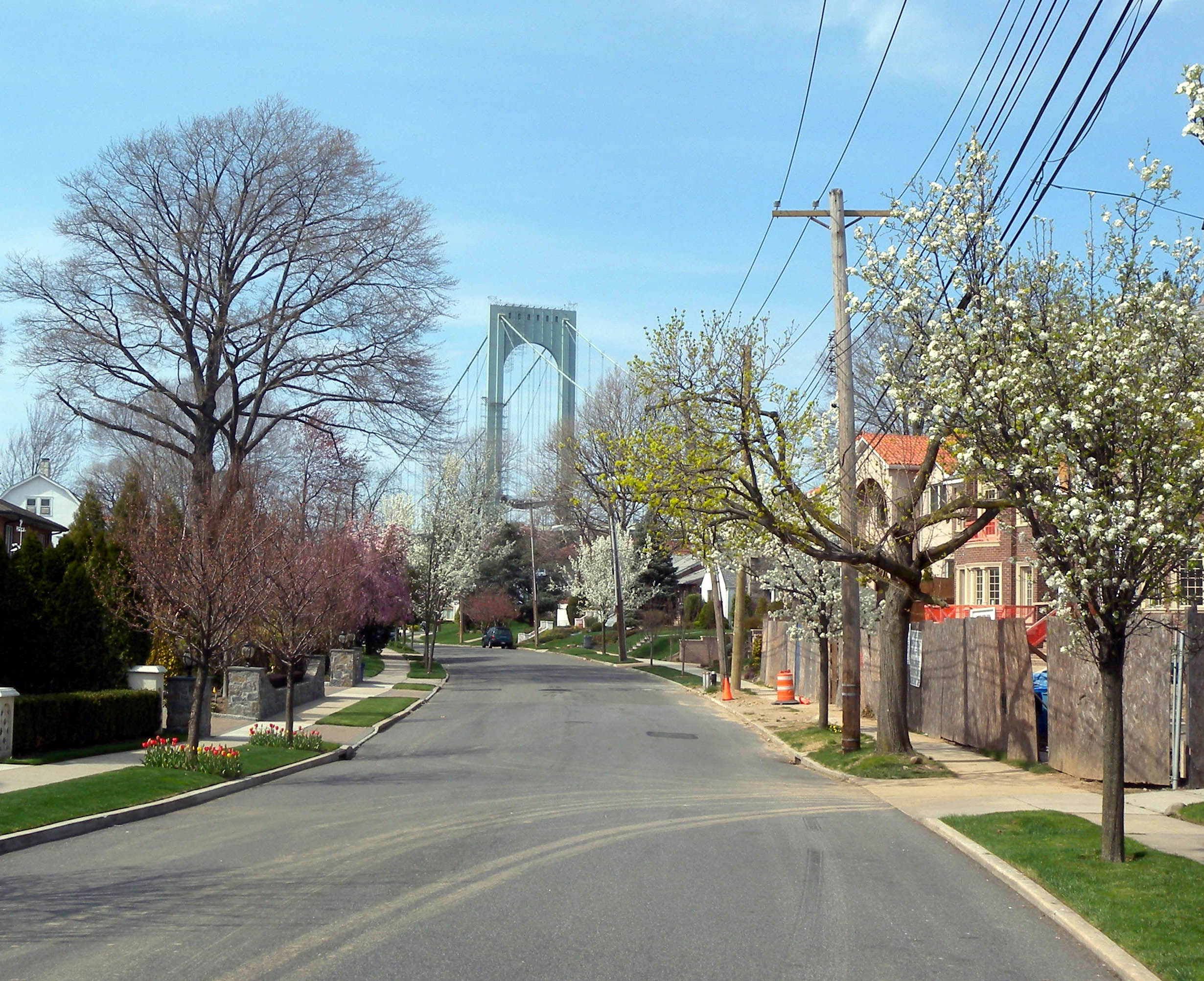
Malba Drive

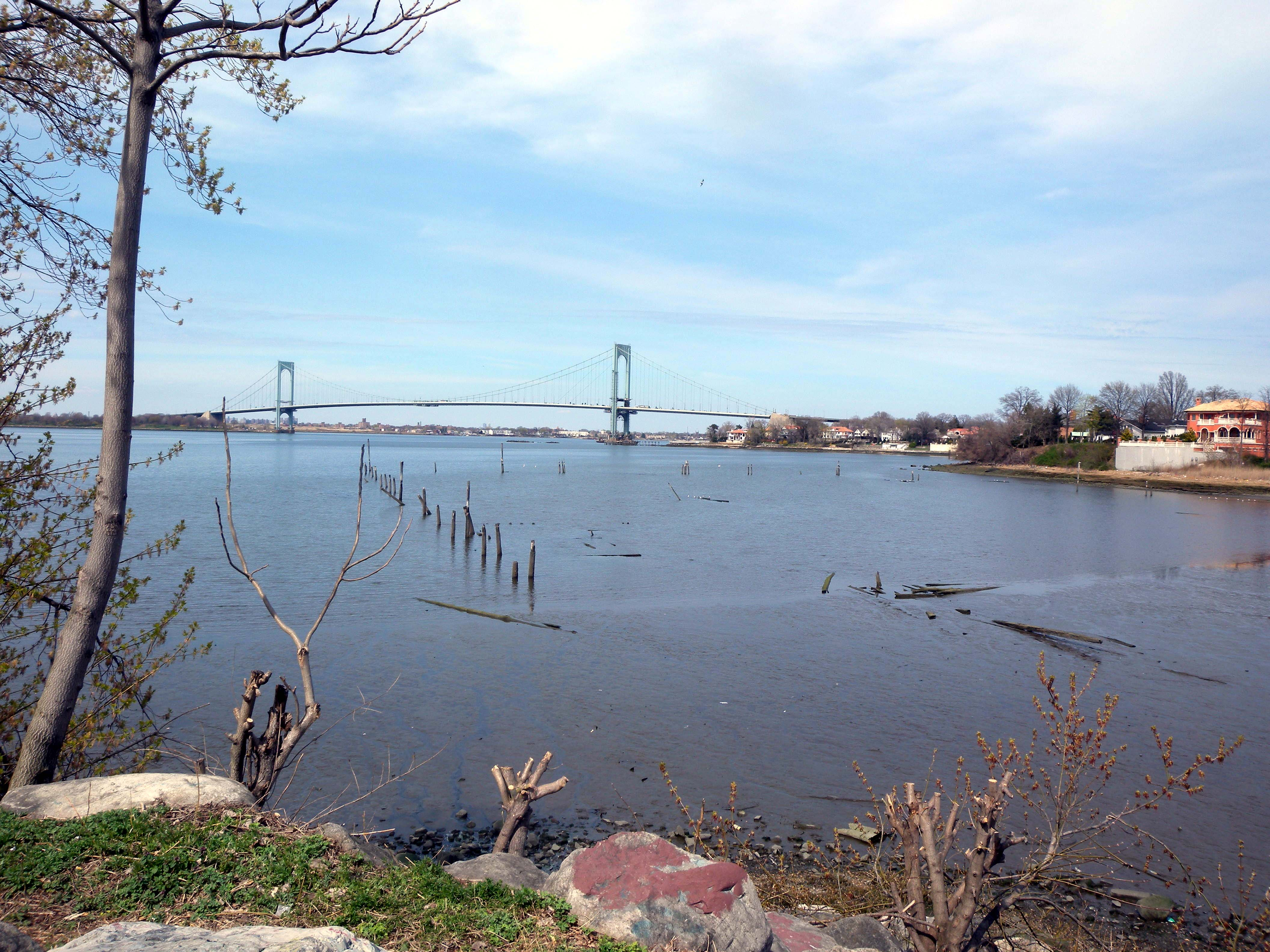
Powell's Cove

The name of the subsection of Malba in northern Whitestone is derived from the first letters of the surnames of its five founders of the Malba Land Company: Maycock, Alling, Lewis, Bishop, and Avis. Malba is considered part of Whitestone, and is one of the more affluent communities in Queens. Demographically, the population is mostly white and of European descent (Greek, Italian, Irish), as well as Jewish, with a small minority of Asian Americans. Most of the residential properties in Malba are large expensive homes.

The first known resident of the area known as present-day Malba was David Roe, who arrived from England in the 1640s. According to Clarence Almon Torrey's book, David Roe Of Flushing And Some Of His Descendants, Roe became a resident of Flushing circa 1666. In 1683, Roe was taxed upon owning 35 acres (140,000 m^{2}) and thereafter increased his holdings substantially, ultimately acquiring the upland around what was to become Malba. Roe's farm was on the east side of the bay, which was then known as "Roe's Cove". He was among the most well-to-do citizens of Flushing, owning lands, farm stock, carpenter's tools and two slaves.

In 1786, John Powell purchased Roe's 87-acre (350,000 m^{2}) parcel for 1,685 pounds, 6 shillings, and 8 pence. It has been reported that Roe lost his lands for his allegiance to the crown during the American War of Independence. Powell thereafter built a home and the cove was renamed "Powell's Cove", the name it bears today. During the 19th century, some of Powell's land passed into the hands of Harry Genet, a member of the Tammany Hall, New York City's infamous political machine. Powell's house was destroyed by fire in the 1890s.

During the second half of the 19th century, the Roe/Powell land passed to a succession of owners. A map dating from 1873 lists the Smiths, Biningers and Nostrands as landowners in the area. The Nostrand and Smith farms represented a large portion of what is Malba today. The area around Hill Court and 14th Avenue was known as "Whitestone Heights". In 1883 railroad service to Manhattan was extended on the "Whitestone and Westchester Railroad", later the Long Island Rail Road. The terminus of the Whitestone line was at "Whitestone Landing" (154th Street), a popular summer resort area during the late 19th century and early 20th century.

William Ziegler, a self-made industrialist and president of the Royal Baking Powder Company bought all these parcels in or about 1883 and his holdings became known as the "Ziegler Tract". Ziegler died on May 24, 1905, leaving his wife, Electa Matilda Ziegler (a philanthropist for the blind, among other things) and son, William Jr., then 14 years of age.

William S. Champ (Ziegler's former secretary) and W.C. Demarest (Mrs. Ziegler's nephew) (both to become among the first families residing in Malba) formed a Realty Trust to purchase the Ziegler tract from his estate for development purposes. Champ was vice president of the Realty Trust, and also one of the executors of Ziegler's estate. The Ziegler Tract had been appraised for $100,000 shortly after Ziegler's death. In the spring of 1906, the Realty Trust secured over 100 investors from New Haven, Guilford, Bridgeport, and other Connecticut towns, to the planned purchase of the Ziegler Tract. Based on a review of early maps of the area, the developers, at one point, planned a very densely populated community; with homes on lots no bigger than 20 feet (6.1 m) wide. This plan was modified and much larger properties were developed. The trust represented to the investors that the property could be purchased from the Ziegler estate for $640,000. In fact, the 163 acres (0.66 km^{2}) which ultimately became Malba, had been earlier purchased from the Ziegler estate for $350,000. Thereafter such Connecticut residents as Samuel R. Avis, Noble P. Bishop, George W. Lewis, David R. Alling and George Maycock were elected trustees (altogether these were the five names that combined to form the MALBA name) of the Malba Land Company. The true, lesser, amount paid to Ziegler's estate was not uncovered until 1912. (For a complete discussion of the Realty Trust's acquisition of the land and its subsequent defense of a lawsuit from the Malba Land Company, see Crowe v. Malba Land Co., 135 N.Y.S. 454, 76 Misc. 676 (Sup. Ct. Queens Co. 1912)).

Development slowly began in 1908. A railroad station on the Whitestone line was added where 11th Avenue sits today. The Champs and Demarests were among Malba's first families to own homes in Malba. There were thirteen houses by the time of World War I and more than a hundred were built in the 1920s. The railroad station closed in 1932. The triangle by Malba Drive and 11th Avenue was dedicated as "Jane Champ Park" on November 16, 1969, and was renovated by the Malba Field and Marine Club in 2005.

== Demographics ==
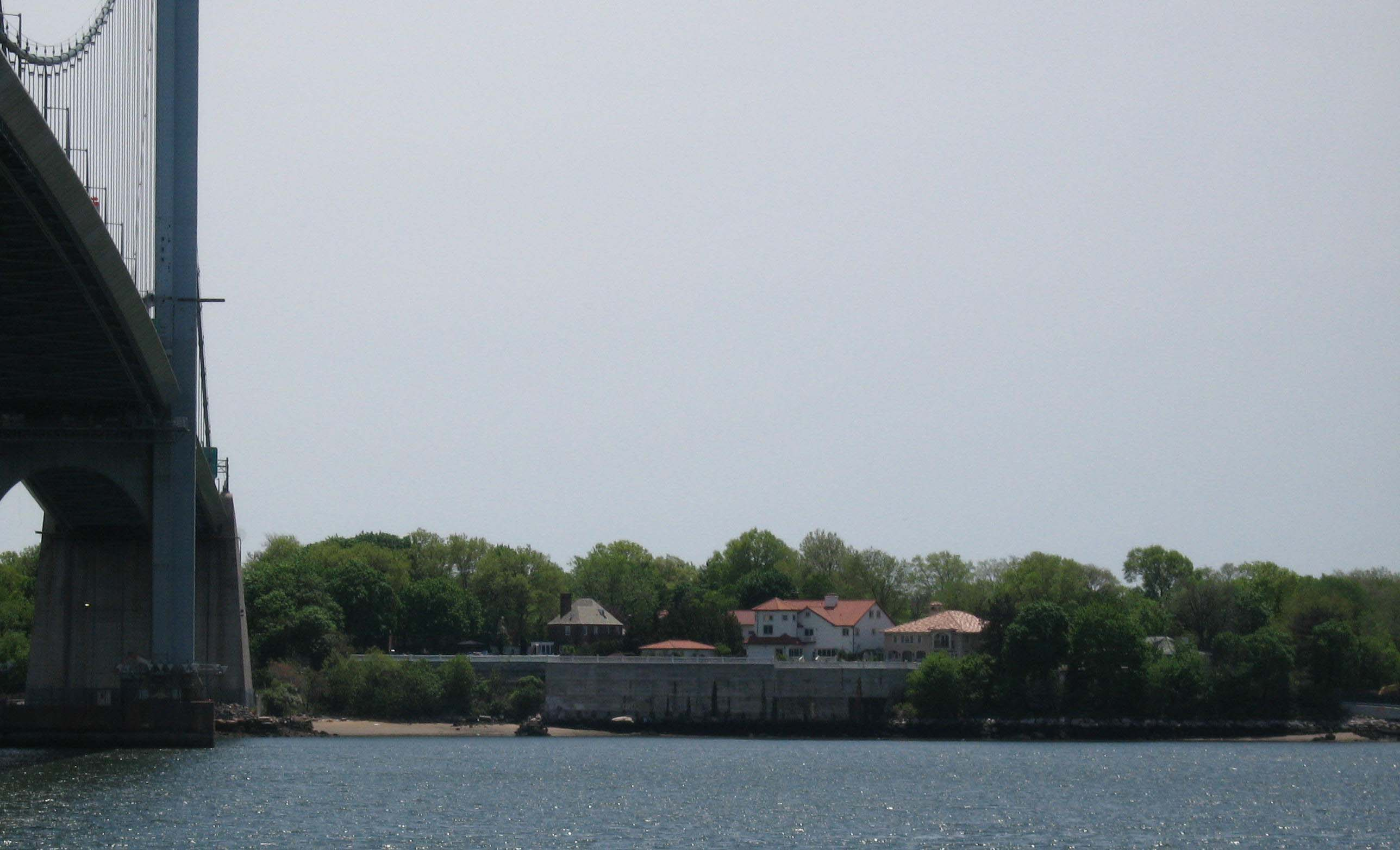
Houses in the Malba section of Whitestone, as seen looking south from Ferry Point Park in the Bronx

Based on data from the 2010 United States census, the population of Whitestone was 30,773, a decrease of 583 (1.9%) from the 31,356 counted in 2000. Covering an area of 1,584.85 acres (641.37 ha), the neighborhood had a population density of 19.4 inhabitants per acre (12,400/sq mi; 4,800/km^{2}).

The racial makeup of the neighborhood was 68.1% (20,956) White, 0.8% (242) African American, 0.1% (18) Native American, 17.4% (5,362) Asian, 0.0% (2) Pacific Islander, 0.3% (90) from other races, and 1.1% (351) from two or more races. Hispanic or Latino people of any race were 12.2% (3,752) of the population.

The entirety of Community Board 7, which comprises Flushing, College Point, and Whitestone, had 263,039 inhabitants as of NYC Health's 2018 Community Health Profile, with an average life expectancy of 84.3 years. This is longer than the median life expectancy of 81.2 for all New York City neighborhoods. Most inhabitants are middle-aged and elderly: 22% are between the ages of between 25 and 44, 30% between 45 and 64, and 18% over 65. The ratio of youth and college-aged residents was lower, at 17% and 7% respectively.

As of 2017, the median household income in Community Board 7 was $51,284. In 2018, an estimated 25% of Whitestone and Flushing residents lived in poverty, compared to 19% in all of Queens and 20% in all of New York City. One in seventeen residents (6%) were unemployed, compared to 8% in Queens and 9% in New York City. Rent burden, or the percentage of residents who have difficulty paying their rent, is 57% in Whitestone and Flushing, higher than the boroughwide and citywide rates of 53% and 51% respectively. Based on this calculation, as of 2018, Whitestone and Flushing are considered to be high-income relative to the rest of the city and not gentrifying.

== Points of interest ==
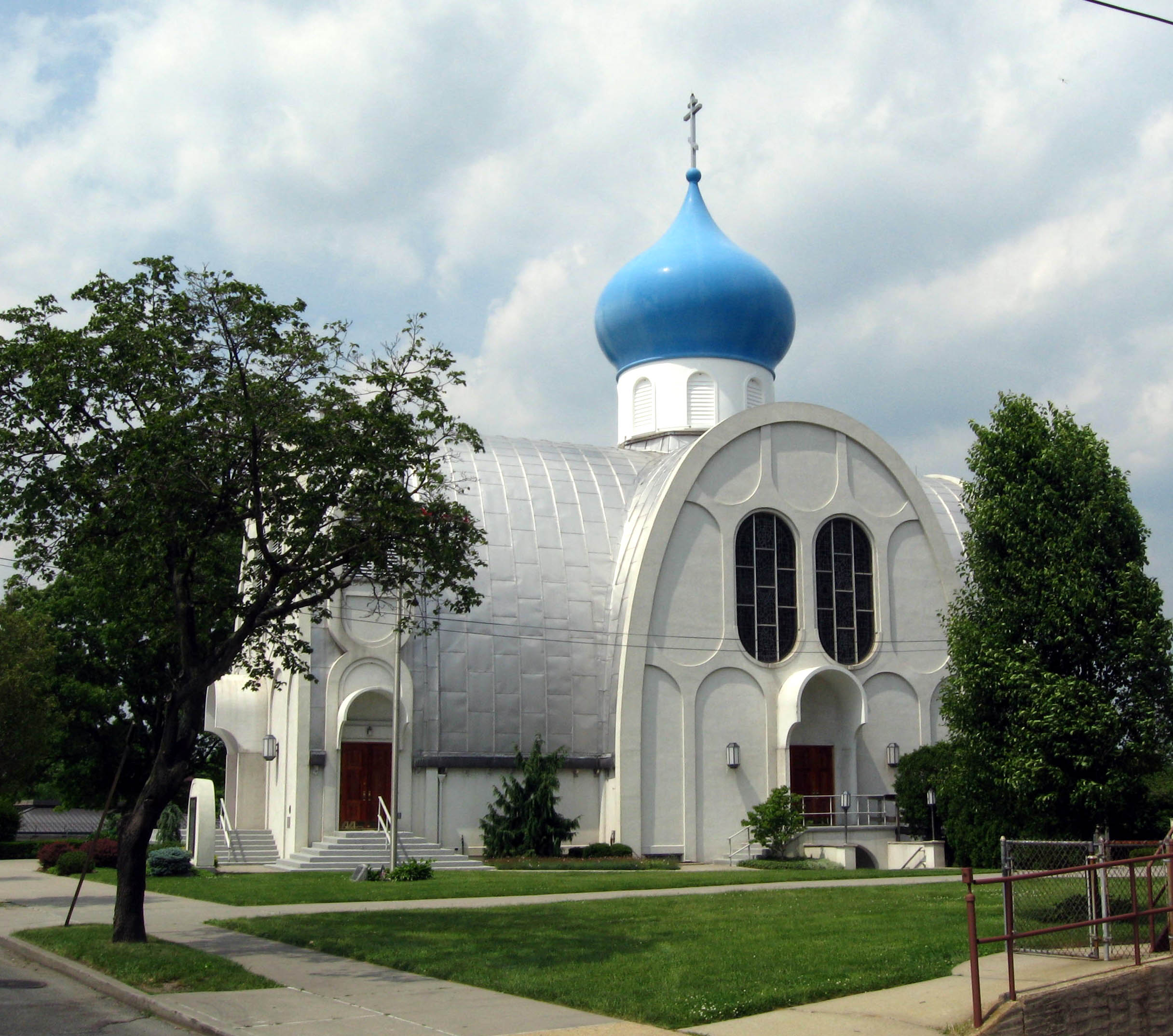
St Nicholas Russian Orthodox Church

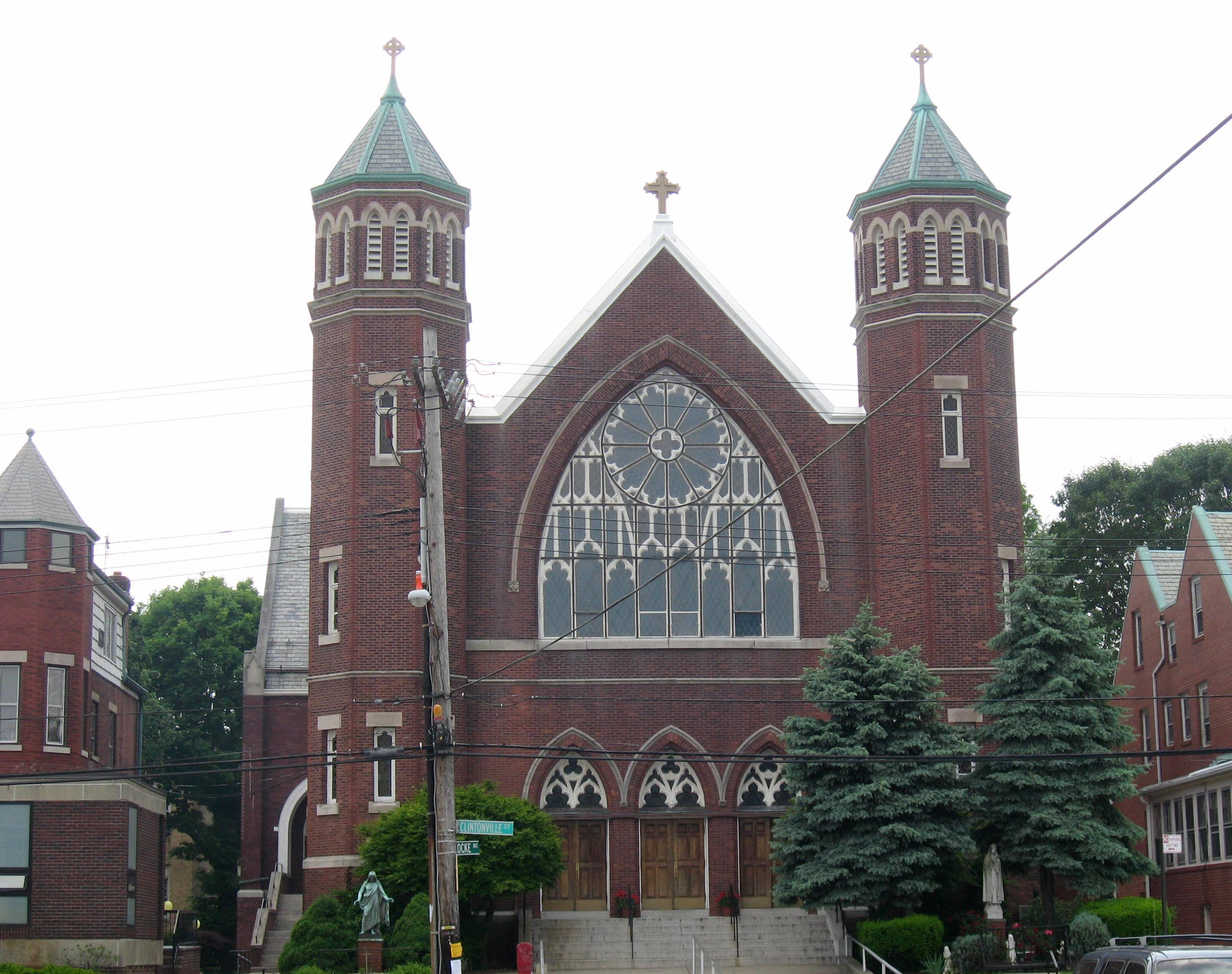
St Luke's Roman Catholic Church

Notable buildings in the community include St. Luke's Roman Catholic Church and Holy Trinity Roman Catholic Church. The Grace Episcopal Church, on Clintonville street, was built in 1858 on land donated by the family of Francis Lewis. The Whitestone Hebrew Centre consists of two buildings on Clintonville Street and was founded in 1929. The Russian Orthodox Church of St. Nicholas, with its distinctive great blue onion dome (added in 1991 after the Cold War, previous building from 1916), was built in 1968. The Greek Orthodox Church, Holy Cross, or "Timios Stavros", is located on 150th Street.

== Economy ==
The following companies currently operate or have operated out of Whitestone:

- Kinemacolor Company of America
- Fairchild Recording Equipment Corporation founded by Sherman Fairchild
- Lee Kum Kee International Holdings Ltd.
- Glacéau
- White Rock Beverages
- World Journal
- Queens Tribune

== Police and crime ==
Flushing, College Point, and Whitestone are patrolled by the 109th Precinct of the NYPD, located at 37-05 Union Street. The 109th Precinct ranked 9th safest out of 69 patrol areas for per-capita crime in 2010. As of 2018, with a non-fatal assault rate of 17 per 100,000 people, Whitestone and Flushing's rate of violent crimes per capita is less than that of the city as a whole. The incarceration rate of 145 per 100,000 people is lower than that of the city as a whole.

The 109th Precinct has a lower crime rate than in the 1990s, with crimes across all categories having decreased by 83.7% between 1990 and 2018. The precinct reported 6 murders, 30 rapes, 202 robberies, 219 felony assaults, 324 burglaries, 970 grand larcenies, and 126 grand larcenies auto in 2018.

== Fire safety ==
Whitestone contains a New York City Fire Department (FDNY) fire station, Engine Co. 295/Ladder Co. 144, at 12-49 149th Street Whitestone, NY 11357.

== Health ==
As of 2018, preterm births and births to teenage mothers are less common in Whitestone and Flushing than in other places citywide. In Whitestone and Flushing, there were 63 preterm births per 1,000 live births (compared to 87 per 1,000 citywide), and 8 births to teenage mothers per 1,000 live births (compared to 19.3 per 1,000 citywide). Whitestone and Flushing have a higher than average population of residents who are uninsured. In 2018, this population of uninsured residents was estimated to be 14%, slightly higher than the citywide rate of 12%.

The concentration of fine particulate matter, the deadliest type of air pollutant, in Whitestone and Flushing is 0.0073 milligrams per cubic metre (7.3×10^{−9} oz/ft^{3}), less than the city average. Thirteen percent of Whitestone and Flushing residents are smokers, which is lower than the city average of 14% of residents being smokers. In Whitestone and Flushing, 13% of residents are obese, 8% are diabetic, and 22% have high blood pressure—compared to the citywide averages of 22%, 8%, and 23% respectively. In addition, 15% of children are obese, compared to the citywide average of 20%.

Ninety-five percent of residents eat some fruits and vegetables every day, which is higher than the city's average of 87%. In 2018, 71% of residents described their health as "good", "very good", or "excellent", lower than the city's average of 78%. For every supermarket in Whitestone and Flushing, there are six bodegas.

The nearest major hospitals are NewYork–Presbyterian/Queens and Flushing Hospital Medical Center.

== Post offices and ZIP Code ==
Whitestone is covered by the ZIP Code 11357. The United States Post Office operates two post offices nearby:

- Whitestone Station – 14-44 150th Street
- Linden Hill Station – 29-50 Union Street

== Education ==
Whitestone and Flushing generally have a similar rate of college-educated residents to the rest of the city as of 2018. While 37% of residents age 25 and older have a college education or higher, 23% have less than a high school education and 40% are high school graduates or have some college education. By contrast, 39% of Queens residents and 43% of city residents have a college education or higher. The percentage of Whitestone and Flushing students excelling in math rose from 55% in 2000 to 78% in 2011, and reading achievement rose from 57% to 59% during the same time period.

Whitestone and Flushing's rate of elementary school student absenteeism is less than the rest of New York City. In Whitestone and Flushing, 9% of elementary school students missed twenty or more days per school year, lower than the citywide average of 20%. 86% of high school students in Whitestone and Flushing graduate on time, more than the citywide average of 75%.

=== Schools ===
The New York City Department of Education operates public schools in the area, including P.S. 79 Francis Lewis, P.S. 184 Flushing Manor, J.H.S. 194 William H. Carr, P.S. 193 Alfred J Kennedy, and P.S. 209 Clearview Gardens.

Private elementary/middle schools include Holy Trinity Catholic Academy and St Luke's School.

Private secondary schools include Whitestone Academy (grades 8–12, split off from St Andrew Academy on the Sound) and The Lowell School (grades 3–12).

The Queens Public Library's Whitestone branch is located at 151-10 14th Road.

== Transportation ==
The Bronx–Whitestone Bridge carries Interstate 678 (Whitestone Expressway) to and from the Bronx, as Whitestone is located across the East River from the Bronx. The Cross Island Parkway merges into the Whitestone Expressway approximately 0.5 miles (0.80 km) before the bridge. On the Bronx side, the bridge leads directly into the Bruckner Interchange, the northern terminus of I-678, where the Cross Bronx Expressway (Interstate 95 in New York to the west, Interstate 295 to the east), Bruckner Expressway (Interstate 278 to the west, I-95 to the east), and Hutchinson River Parkway meet. The segment of I-678 between the bridge and the Bruckner Interchange is a depressed freeway.

New York City Bus and MTA Bus Company serve Whitestone on the Q15, Q16, Q20, Q44 SBS, Q50, Q61 and Q76 local routes and the QM2, QM20 and QM32 express routes. Most of the local buses provide access to and from Flushing–Main Street on the IRT Flushing Line (7 and <7> trains) of the New York City Subway. No subway service directly serves this neighborhood.

The Whitestone Branch was a branch of the Long Island Rail Road, running north and east from Flushing. It ran north along Flushing Bay and east along the East River to Whitestone. Originally intended to lead into Westchester County, it was consolidated into the Long Island Rail Road in 1876. Stations consisted of Flushing–Bridge Street, College Point, Malba, Whitestone–14th Avenue, and Whitestone Landing at 155th Street, which later became the Beechhurst Yacht Club. Flushing–Bridge Street Station was built in 1870, College Point, and Whitestone–14th Avenue stations were opened in 1869, and Whitestone Landing Station was built in 1886, all by the F&NS Railroad. Malba station was built in 1909 by the LIRR. The line was abandoned on February 15, 1932, despite efforts by affected commuters to turn the line into a privately operated shuttle route.

== Notable people ==
Notable current and former residents of Whitestone (including Beechhurst and Malba):

- Gracie Allen (1895–1964), actress and comedian
- Roberto Alomar (born 1968), retired Major League Baseball second baseman
- Lottie Alter (1871–1924), actress
- Fatty Arbuckle (1887–1933), actor
- Tony Avella (born 1951), NY State Senator he grew up in College Point
- Ernest Ball (1878–1927), singer and songwriter
- Jill E. Barad (born 1951), former CEO of Mattel
- Minnette Barrett (1880–1964), actress
- Richard Bassford (born 1936), artist
- Mike Baxter (born 1984), Major League Baseball outfielder
- Willow Bay (born 1963), TV correspondent
- Joyce Bell (born 1927), nursing teacher and entomologist
- Denis Belliveau (born 1964), photographer, author and explorer
- Bertha Belmore (1882–1953), actress
- Robert Benchley (1889–1945), actor and newspaper columnist
- Armando Benitez (born 1972), retired Major League Baseball relief pitcher
- Warren Berger (born 1958), journalist
- Maurice Black (1891–1938), actor
- Tex Blaisdell (1920–1999), cartoonist
- Constance Binney (1896–1989), actress
- Clara Bow (1905–1965), actress
- Borden Parker Bowne (1847–1910), Christian philosopher and theologian
- Sully Boyar (1924–2001), actor
- Harry C. Bradley (1869–1947), actor
- Edward C. Braunstein (born in 1981), member of the New York State Assembly
- Elton Britt (1913–1972), country singer
- Margaret Wise Brown (1910–1952), children's book author
- Roscoe Brown (1922–2016), Tuskegee Airman
- Floyd Buckley (1877–1956), actor
- George Burns (1896–1996), actor and comedian
- The Carpio Sextuplets (born 2008), first Hispanic sextuplets born in the United States
- Penelope Casas (1943–2013), cookbook author
- Edmar Castañeda (born 1978), harpist
- John Cena (born 1977), wrestler
- Whittaker Chambers (1901–1961), writer, editor and Soviet spy
- Charlie Chaplin (1889–1977), actor
- John Charles (1885–1921), actor
- Julie Chen (born 1970), journalist
- H. Cooper Cliffe (1862–1939), actor
- Andrew Climie (1834–1897), businessman and politician
- DeWitt Clinton (1769–1828), mayor Of New York City
- Stuart Cohn, TV producer
- Charles S. Colden (1885–1960), Queens Supreme Court Justice, Founder of Queens College
- Wilson Collison (1893–1941), author and playwright
- Ben Cooper (1933–2020), actor
- Alice Crimmins (born 1939), convicted murderer
- Dorothy Dalton (1893–1972), actress
- Gussie Davis (1863–1899), songwriter
- Frederic De Belleville (1855–1923), actor
- Drea de Matteo (born 1972), actress
- Doris Doscher (1882–1970), actress and model
- Simeon Draper (1804–1866), chairman of the New York Republican State Committee
- J. Malcolm Dunn (1869–1946), actor
- Eddie Egan (1930–1995), NYPD detective
- Dustin Farnum (1874–1929), singer, dancer, and actor
- Fred Fear, founder of Fred Fear & Company
- Tom Fexas (1941–2006), yacht designer
- Harvey Samuel Firestone (1868–1938), businessman, founder of Firestone Tire and Rubber Company
- The Fleshtones, garage rock band
- Hazel Forbes (1910–1980), actress
- John Frankenheimer (1930–2002), film director
- Adam Garner (1898–1969), pianist and composer
- Rose Girone (1912–2025), Holocaust survivor
- Paulette Goddard (1910–1990), actress
- Stan Goldberg (1932–2014), comic book artist
- Brian Gorman (born 1959), umpire in Major League Baseball
- Tom Gorman (1919–1986), umpire in Major League Baseball
- Oscar Graeve, writer for the Saturday Evening Post
- Jimmy Greco, Grammy nominated producer
- Angela Greene (1921–1978), actress
- Michael Greenfield (born 1963), racing driver
- Dan Halloran (born 1971, Auburndale), former member of the New York City Council
- Arthur Hammerstein (1872–1955), Broadway producer, uncle of Oscar Hammerstein II
- Charles Henry Hansen (1913–1995), music publisher
- Frank Harding, music publisher
- Lumsden Hare (1874–1964), actor
- Heart Attack, hardcore punk band
- Holmes Herbert (1882–1956), actor
- Alexander Herrmann (1844–1896), magician
- Christopher Higgins (born 1983), New York Rangers forward
- Frank T. Hines (1879–1960), chief of the U.S. Veterans Bureau
- Willie and Eugene Howard, comedy duo
- Harry Houdini (1874–1926), magician
- Graham Ingels (1915–1991), illustrator
- John William Isham (1866–1902), vaudevillian
- Burl Ives (1909–1995), actor and singer
- Chic Johnson (1891–1962), actor and comedian
- Howard Johnson (born 1960), retired Major League Baseball third baseman
- Selene Johnson (1876–1960), actress
- Helen Kane (1904–1966), singer
- Artie Kaplan (born 1935), musician, singer-songwriter and saxophonist
- Katerina Katakalides (born 1998), model and 2016 Teen Miss New York
- Buster Keaton (1895–1966), actor and director
- Kick Kelly (1856–1926), catcher, manager and umpire for Major League Baseball
- Alfred J. Kennedy (1877–1944), politician
- Andy Kindler (born 1956), actor and comedian
- Robert A. Kindler, business executive
- John Reed King (1914–1979), radio and television host
- April Kingsley (1941–2023), art critic
- Eugene Kohn (1887–1977), opera conductor
- Winifred Kingston (1894–1967), actress
- Charles Kramer (1916–1988), lawyer
- Fiorello H. La Guardia (1882–1947), mayor of New York City
- Joey "Fitness" Lasalla, contestant on The Amazing Race
- Brian Lehrer (born 1952), radio talk show
- Warren Lehrer, author and artist
- Mickey Leigh (born 1954), musician and author, brother of Joey Ramone
- Murray Leinster (1896–1975), science fiction author
- Francis Lewis (1713–1802), Declaration Of Independence signer
- Larry Lindsey (born 1954), Federal Reserve governor
- June Lockhart (born 1925), lived on North Drive in Malba and was back door neighbor to 14 Center Drive
- Ronnie the Limo Driver (born 1949) from the Howard Stern radio show
- Tommy Lucchese (1899–1967), mobster
- Charles Hill Mailes (1870–1937), actor
- Thalia Mara (1911–2003), ballet educator
- Jesse Malin (born 1967), musician
- D. Keith Mano (1942–2016), author, TV screenwriter and journalist
- Patricia Marmont (1921–2020), actress
- Percy Marmont (1883–1977), actor
- Stella Mayhew (1874–1934), actress
- John Maynard (1786–1850), lawyer and politician
- Bobby McDermott (1914–1963), basketball player and coach
- Claire McDowell (1877–1966), actress
- John McHugh Sr. (1924–2019), World War II veteran
- Beryl Mercer (1882–1939), actress
- Matthew J. Merritt (1895–1946), member of the U.S. House of Representatives
- Steven Molaro (born 1972), creator of The Big Bang Theory
- Malcolm Moran, sportswriter
- Clara Morris (1848–1925), actress
- Andy Narell (born 1954), jazz musician and composer
- Jill Nicolini (born 1978), reporter and former model, actress, and reality TV show participant
- Daniel A. Nigro (born 1948), FDNY Fire Commissioner
- John Nihill (1850–1908), U.S. Army soldier
- Gloria Okon, TV personality
- Vickie Paladino (born 1954), politician, member of the New York City Council for the 19th district
- Bianca Pappas, first Miss Whitestone United States 2011, and later competed in Miss New York USA
- Ishle Yi Park, poet
- Norman Parsons (1931–2013), former mayor of Sea Cliff, New York
- Anne Paolucci (1926–2012), author and literary scholar
- Tom Patricola (1891–1950), actor, comedian and dancer
- Ann Pennington (1893–1971), actress, dancer and singer
- Lila Perl (1921–2013), author
- Mary Pickford (1892–1979), actress
- Lew Pollack (1895–1946), songwriter
- Joshua Prager (born 1949), physician
- Dee Dee Ramone (1951–2002), Ramones bassist
- Albert B. Randall (1879–1945), Knight (Chevalier) of the Legion D'Honnere, Rear Admiral, USNR Highest ranking non-military officer leading the U.S.Merchant Marines 1943–45
- Nicholas Rescher (1928–2024), philosopher
- Harry Richman (1895–1972), actor and singer. In 1963 his mansion, next to BPOA, was Hellen Tasopulos' St Andrew Academy on the Sound, which by 1972 included a junior college, but was impounded by the IRS in 1977.
- Artie Ripp (born 1940), music industry executive, entrepreneur and record producer
- Richard Roth (born 1955), journalist
- Douglas Rushkoff (born 1961), media theorist, writer, columnist, lecturer, graphic novelist, and documentarian
- Nina Russell (1930-2019), television writer, actress, dancer and model
- George Santos (born 1988), politician and businessman
- Gia Scala (1934–1972), actress
- Joseph M. Schenck (1878–1961), film producer
- John F. Scileppi (1902–1987), judge of the New York Court of Appeals
- Charles H. Sneff (1841–1911), sugar merchant
- William Shea (1907–1991), lawyer, founder of the Continental League, namesake for Shea Stadium
- Flora Sheffield, actress
- Claire Shulman (1926–2020), former Queens Borough President
- Fred Spira (1924–2007), inventor
- Vincent Starrett (1886–1974), author and newspaperman
- Leonard P. Stavisky (1925–1999), New York State Senator
- Toby Ann Stavisky (born 1939), New York State Senator
- William Stickles (1882–1971), composer
- Kevin J. Sweeney (born 1970), Roman Catholic Bishop of Paterson, NJ since July 2020
- Leland L. Summers (1891–1927), consulting engineer
- Norma Talmadge (1894–1957), actress
- Howard Thurston (1869–1936), magician
- Mike Tirico (born 1966), sportscaster
- Carmine Tramunti (1910–1978), Underworld crime figure
- Herb Turetzky (1945–2022), official scorer for the Brooklyn Nets for 54 years, including all of its incarnations, starting with the franchise's inaugural game in 1967
- Walter Underhill (1795–1866), member of the United States House of Representatives
- Rudolph Valentino (1895–1926), actor
- Christina Vidal (born 1981), singer and actress
- Lisa Vidal (born 1965), actress
- Percival Vivian (1890–1961), actor
- Arthur W. Wallander (1892–1980), former New York City Police Commissioner
- Benjamin Ward (1925–2002), former New York City Police Commissioner
- Jacob B. Warlow (1818–1890), law enforcement officer, detective and police captain in the New York Police Department
- John B. Watson (1878–1958), psychologist
- Hy Weiss (1923–2007), record producer
- Walt Whitman (1819–1892), poet
- April Winchell (born 1960), voice actress
- Paul Winchell (1922-2005), ventriloquist, comedian, actor, humanitarian, and inventor
- Charles Yerkow (1912–1994), author
- John Lloyd Young (born 1975), singer, actor and composer
- Peter Zaremba, musician and TV host
- Jane Breskin Zalben (born 1951), author and illustrator

== In popular culture ==
TV shows filmed in, or set in, Whitestone include:

- A scene in the season five episode "Where's Johnny?" of The Sopranos was filmed in a bar in Whitestone formerly known as "Fiddler's Green".
- The character of Barbara Lorenz from The Cosby Mysteries, played by Lynn Whitfield, is originally from Whitestone.

Movies filmed in Whitestone include:

- Cruise (2018)
- Show Me a Hero (2014)
- A Walk Among the Tombstones (2014)
- Pride and Glory (2008)
- Dear J (2008)
- Dummy (2002)
- Boiler Room (2000); a scene was filmed in the same bar as "Where's Johnny?".
- Celebrity (1998)
- Queens Logic (1991)
- Shaft in Africa (1973)
- Taking Off (1971)

== See also ==
- Francis Lewis
- List of Queens neighborhoods
- Whitestone Point Light
