= Scallion =

Edible vegetable of various species in the genus Allium

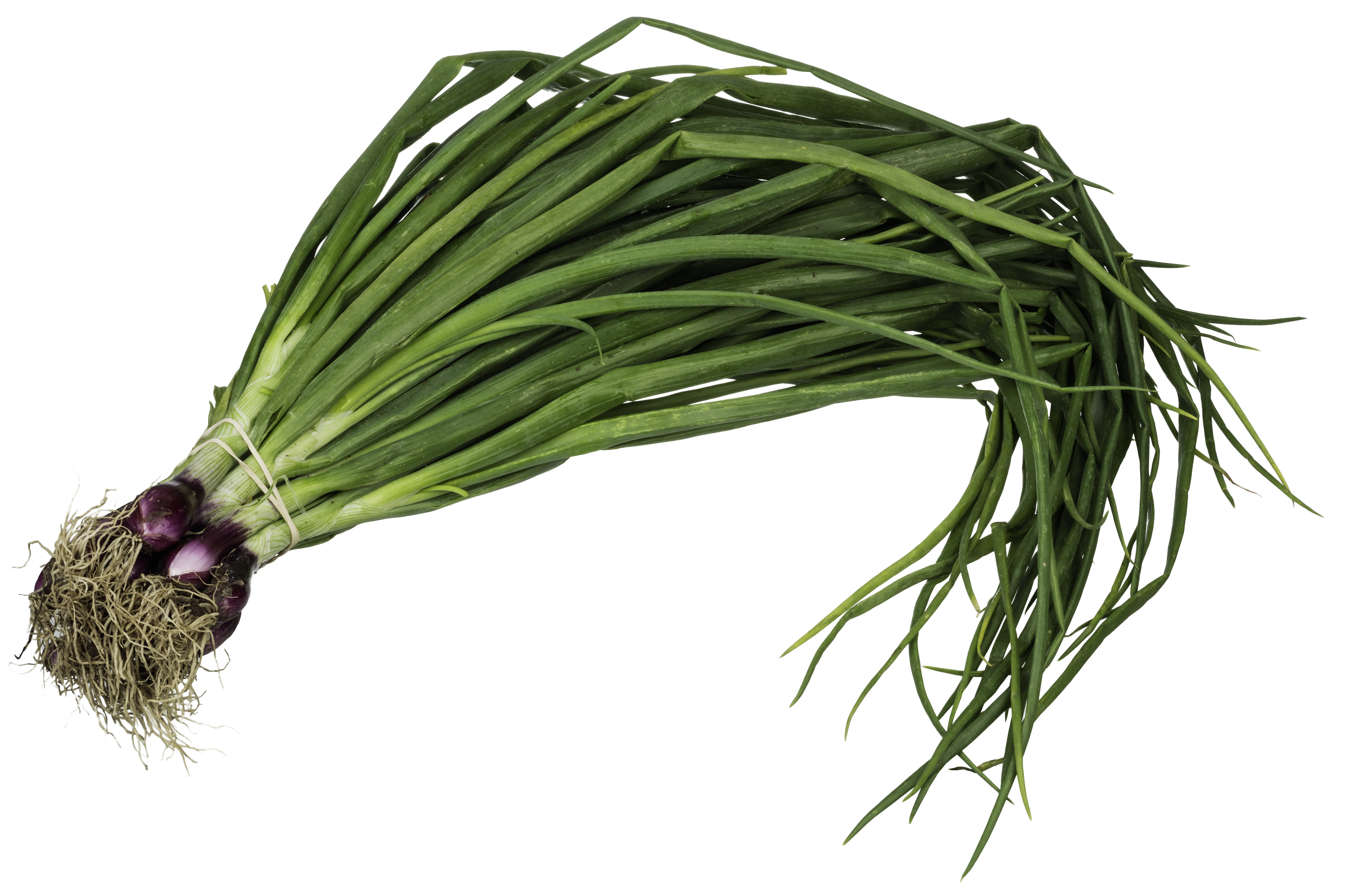
- A bundle of "red scallions"
- Alternative names: green onions, spring onions

Scallions (also known as green onions and spring onions) are edible vegetables of various species in the genus Allium. Scallions generally have a milder taste than most onions. Green onions/scallions have a long, delicate green stem that is white near the root. They have no bulb and a mild, sweet onion flavour. Their close relatives include garlic, shallots, leeks, chives, and Chinese onions. The leaves are eaten both raw and cooked.

Scallions produce hollow, tubular, green leaves that grow directly from the bulb, which does not fully develop. This is different to other Allium species where bulbs fully develop, such as commercially available onions and garlic. True spring onions look similar to green onions, but have a distinctive white bulb at the base.

== Etymology and naming ==
The names scallion and shallot derive from the Old French eschalotte, by way of eschaloigne, from the Latin Ascalōnia caepa or "Ascalonian onion", a namesake of the ancient Eastern Mediterranean coastal city of Ascalon.

Other names used in various parts of the world include spring onion, green onion, table onion, salad onion, onion stick, long onion, baby onion, precious onion, wild onion, yard onion, gibbon and syboe (Scots).

== Varieties ==
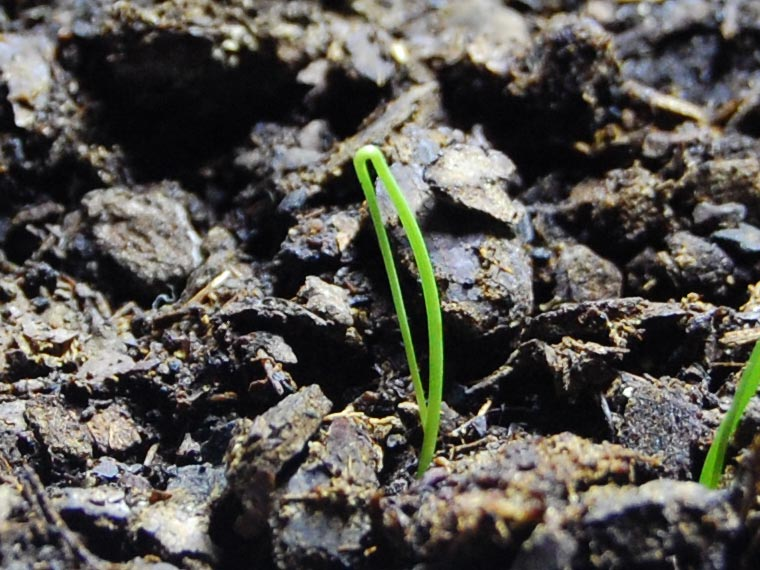
A germinating scallion, 10 days old

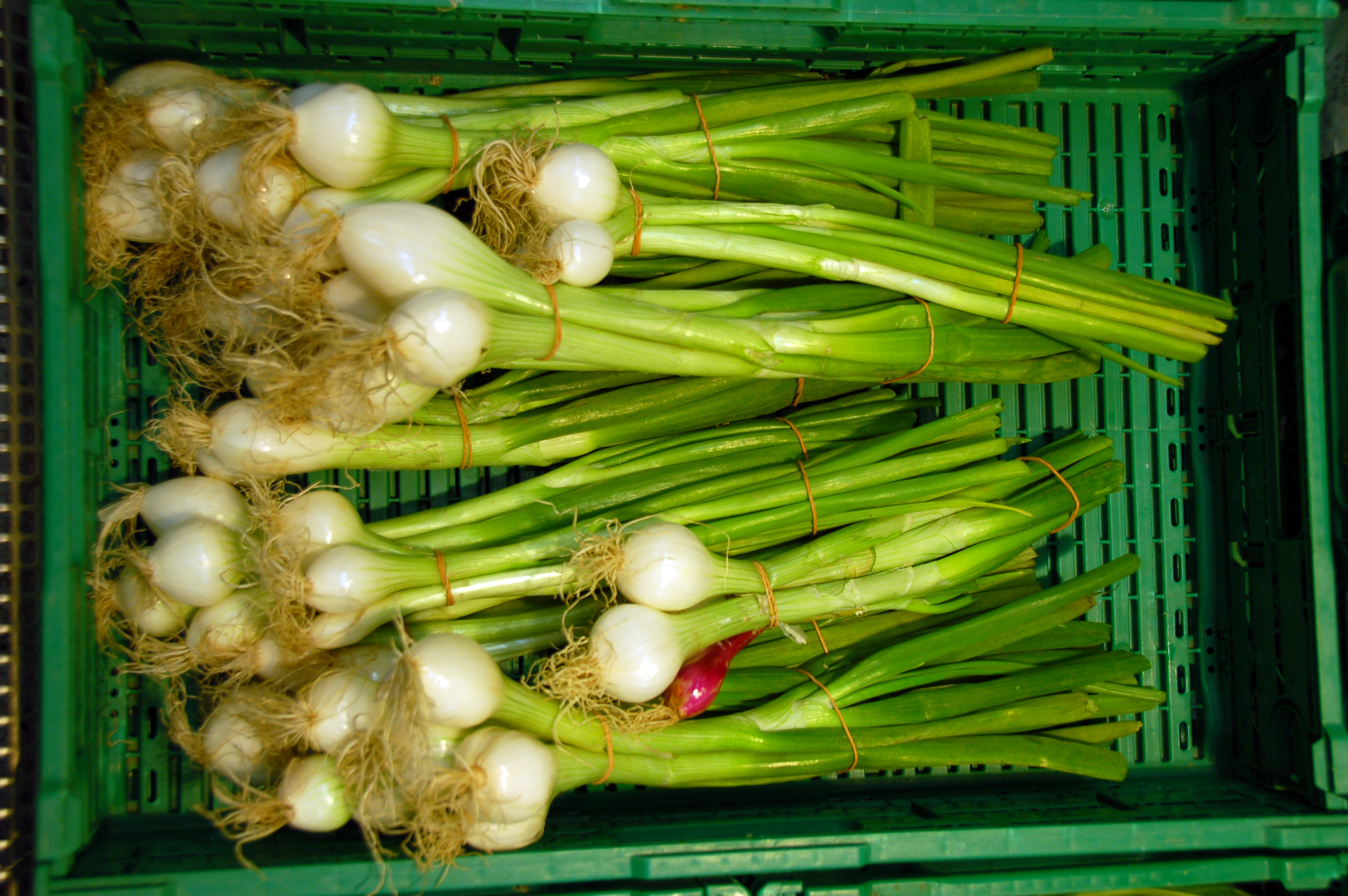
A close-up view of spring onions (note the larger bulbs)

Species and cultivars that may be used as scallions include

- A. cepa
  - 'White Lisbon'
  - 'White Lisbon Winter Hardy' – an extra-hardy variety for overwintering
  - Calçot
  - A. cepa var. cepa – Most of the cultivars grown in the West as scallions belong to this variety. The scallions from A. cepa var. cepa (common onion) are usually from a young plant, harvested before a bulb forms or sometimes soon after slight bulbing has occurred.
  - A. cepa var. aggregatum (formerly A. ascalonicum) – commonly called shallots or sometimes eschalot.
- A. chinense
- A. fistulosum, the Welsh onion – does not form bulbs even when mature, and is grown in the West almost exclusively as a scallion or salad onion.
- A. × proliferum – sometimes used as scallions

== Germination ==
Scallions generally take 7–14 days to germinate depending on the variety.

== Uses ==
=== Culinary ===
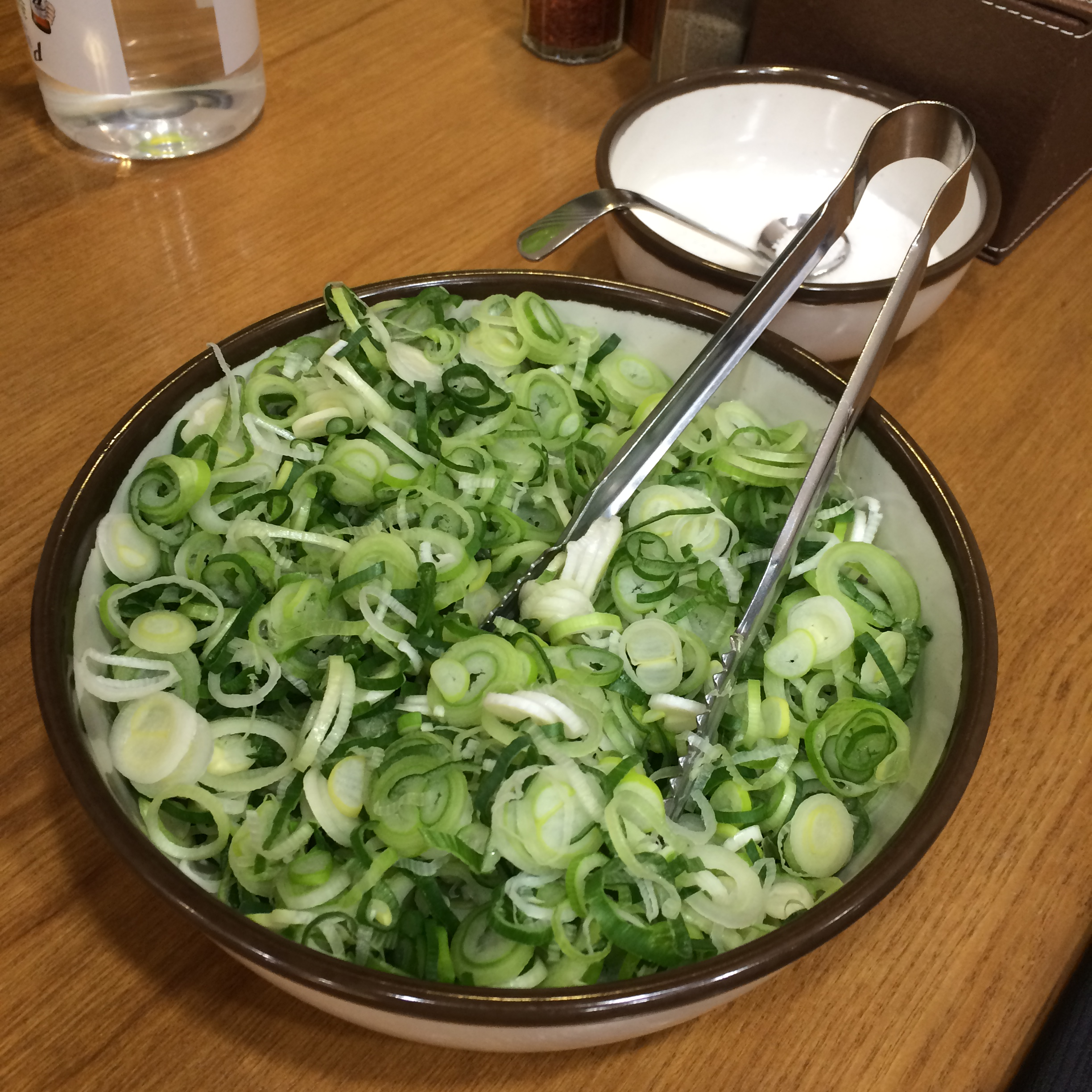
Chopped scallions

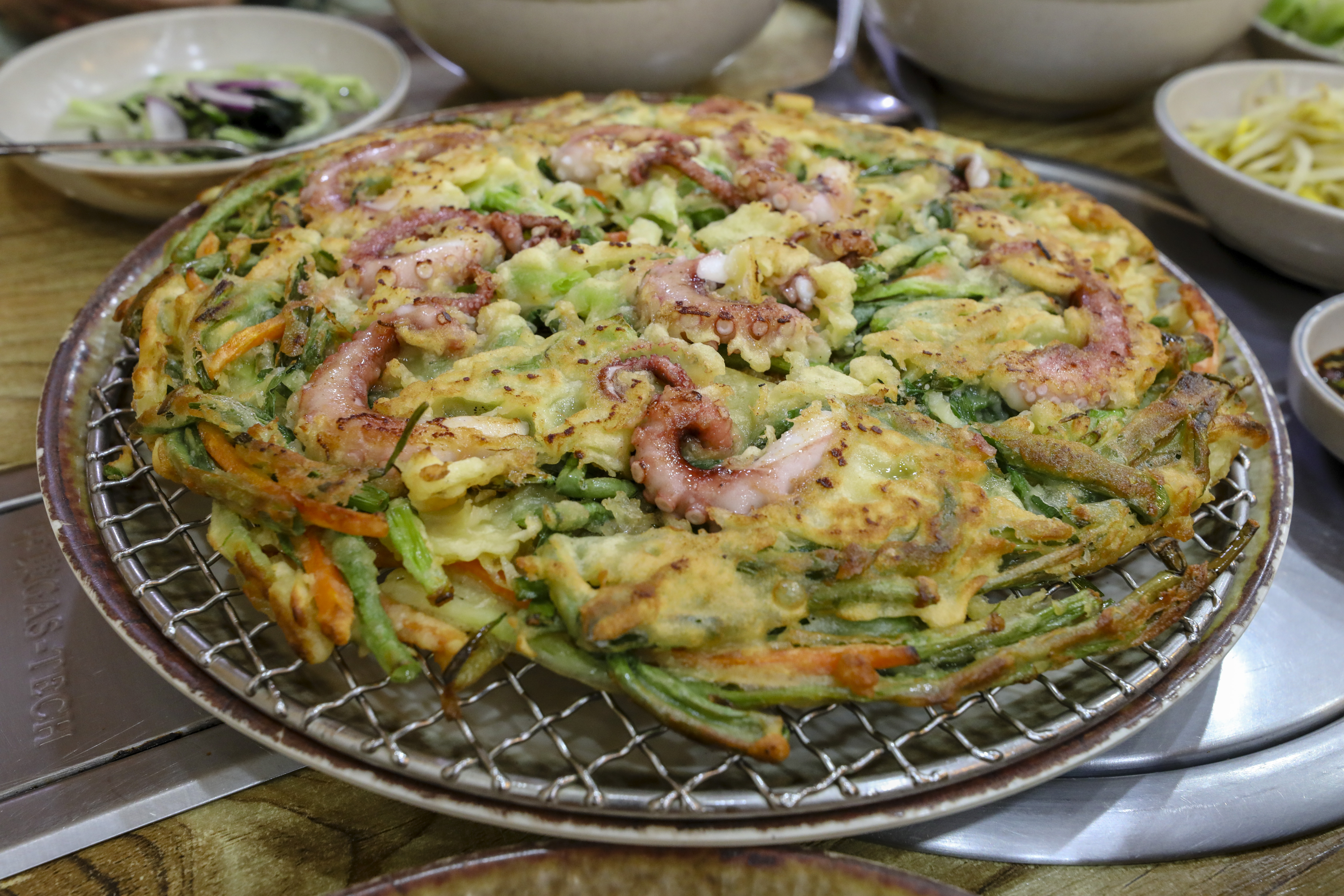
A Korean haemulpajeon (seafood and scallion pancake)

Scallions may be cooked or used raw, often as a part of salads, salsas, or as a garnish. Scallion oil is sometimes made from the green leaves, after they are chopped, lightly cooked, and emulsified in a vegetable oil.

In Catalan cuisine, calçot is a type of onion traditionally eaten in a calçotada (plural: calçotades). An eponymous gastronomic event is traditionally held between the end of winter and early spring, where calçots are grilled, dipped in salvitxada or romesco sauce, and consumed in massive quantities.

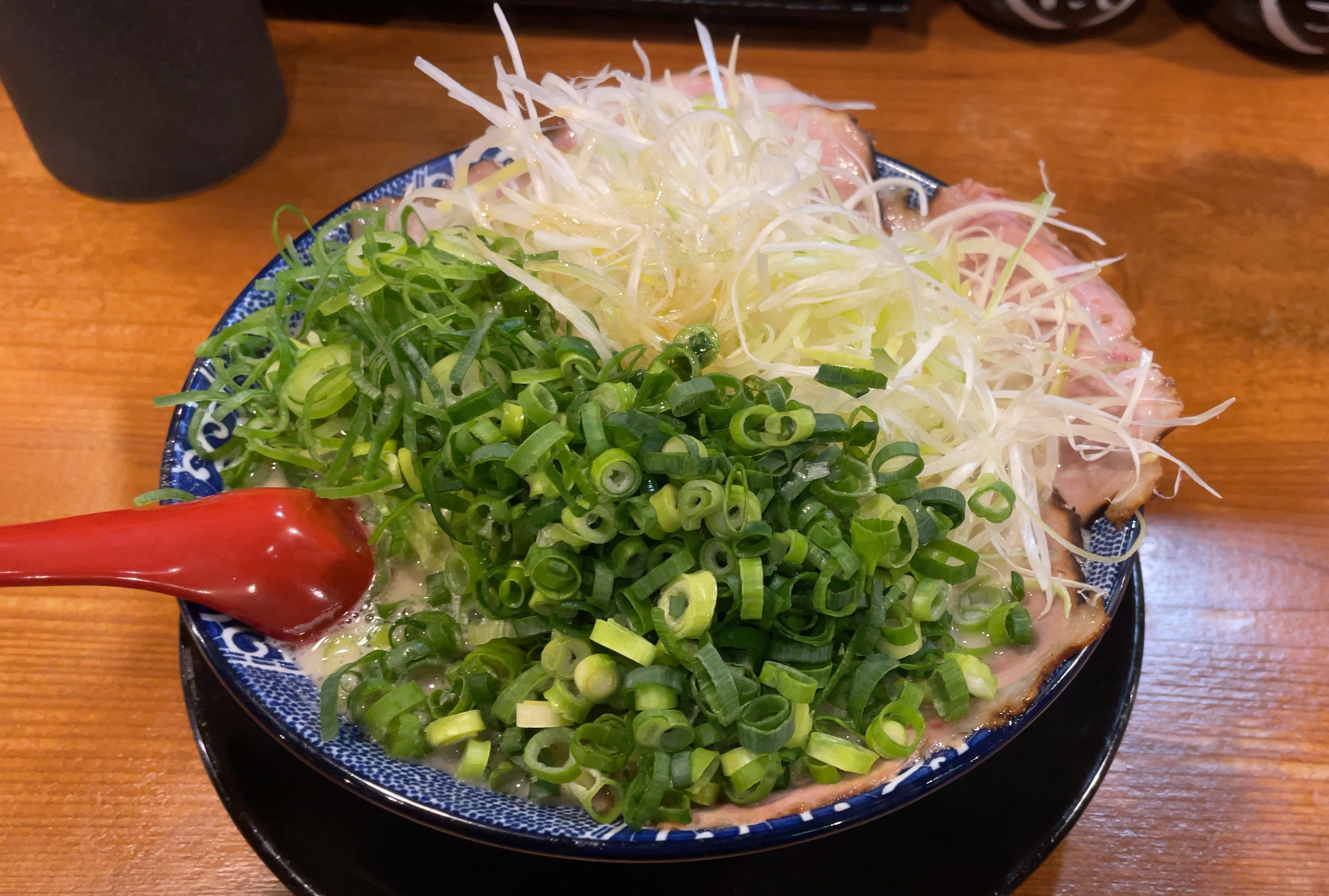
Japanese ramen topped with sliced negi

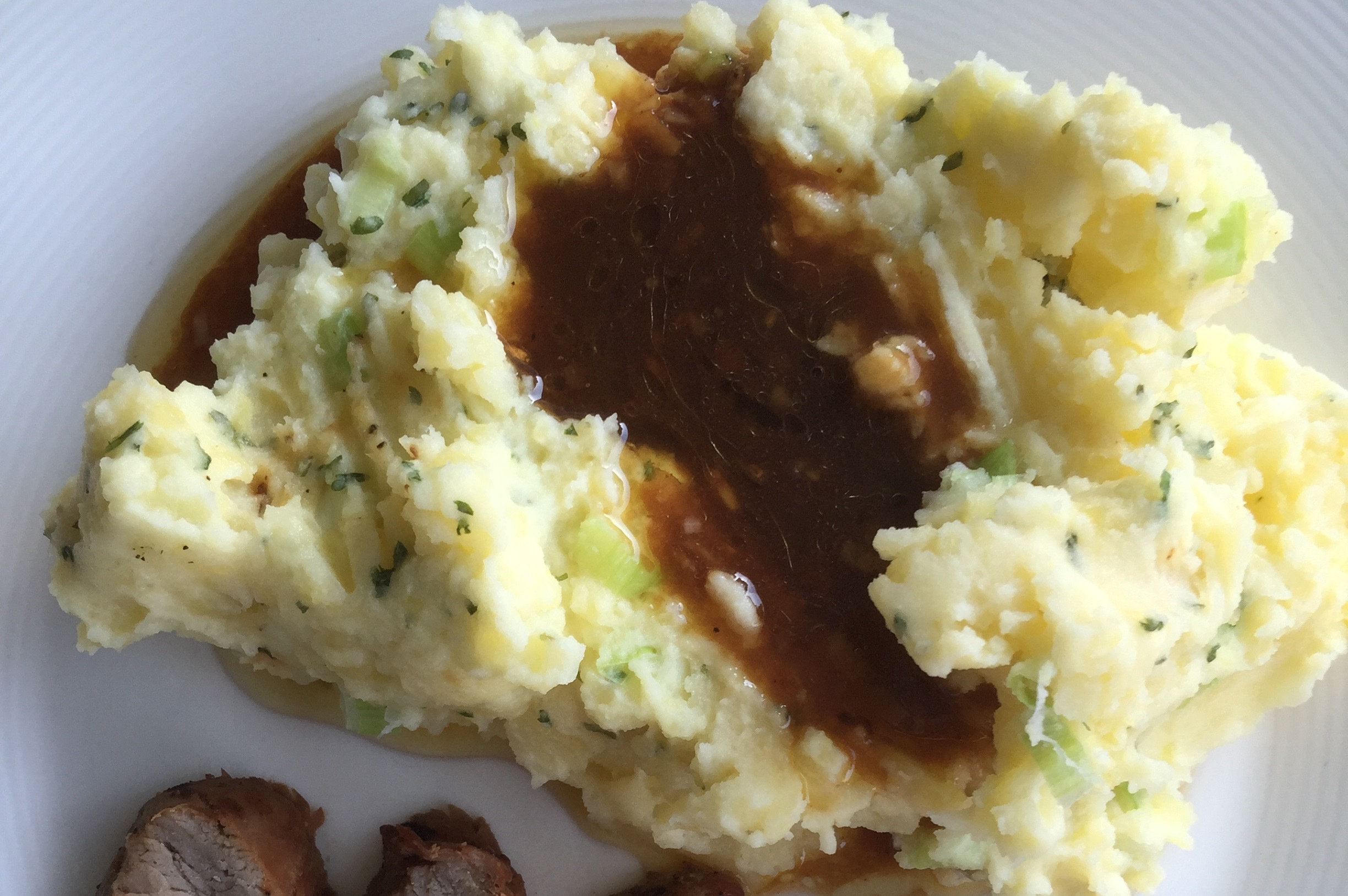
Irish champ, served with gravy

In Ireland, scallions are chopped and added to mashed potatoes, known as champ or as an added ingredient to colcannon.

In Mexico and the Southwest United States, cebollitas (transl. little onions) are scallions that are sprinkled with salt, grilled whole, and eaten with lime juice, cheese and rice. They are typically served as a traditional accompaniment to asado dishes. At the Passover meal (Seder), Afghan Jews and Persian Jews strike one another with scallions before singing "Dayenu", thus re-enacting the whipping endured by the Hebrews enslaved by the ancient Egyptians.

In Asian cuisine, diced scallions are often used in soup, noodle, and seafood dishes, sandwiches, curries, and as part of a stir fry. The bottom half-centimetre of the root is commonly removed before use.

In Chinese cuisine, scallion is commonly used together with ginger and garlic to cook a wide variety of vegetables and meat. This combination is often called the "holy trinity" of Chinese cooking, much like the mirepoix in French cuisine (celery, onions, and carrots) or the holy trinity in Cajun cuisine (onions, bell peppers and celery). The white part of the scallion is usually fried with other ingredients while the green part is usually chopped to decorate finished food.

In Indian cuisine, it is sometimes eaten raw as an appetizer. In north India, coriander, mint and onion chutney are made using uncooked scallions. It is also used as a vegetable with chapatis and rotis. In south India, spring onions stir fried with coconut and shallots (known as Vengaya Thazhai Poriyal in Tamil and Ulli Thandu Upperi in Malayalam) are served as a side dish with rice.

In Japanese cuisine, scallions are used extensively as a topping.

In Nepalese cuisine, scallion is used in different meat dish fillings like momo and choyla (meat mixed with scallion and spices).

In the southern Philippines, it is ground in a mortar along with ginger and chili pepper to make a native condiment called wet palapa, which can be used to spice dishes or as a topping for fried or sun-dried food. It can also be used to make the dry version of palapa, when it is stir fried with fresh coconut shavings and wet palapa.

In Vietnam, Welsh onion (Allium fistulosum) is important to prepare dưa hành (fermented onions) which is served for Tết, the Vietnamese New Year. A kind of sauce, mỡ hành (Welsh onion fried in oil), is used in dishes such as cơm tấm, bánh ít and cà tím nướng. Welsh onion is the main ingredient in the dish cháo hành, which is a rice porridge used to treat the common cold.

Onions, spring or scallions (includes tops and bulb), raw (Daily Value)
Nutritional value per 100 g (3.5 oz)
- Energy: 133.88 kJ (32.00 kcal)
- Carbohydrates: 7.34 g
- Sugars: 2.33 g
- Dietary fiber: 2.6 g
- Fat: 0.19 g
- Protein: 1.83 g
Vitamins and minerals
Vitamins	Quantity %DV^{†}
Vitamin A equiv. beta-Carotene	6% 50 μg 6% 598 μg
Thiamine (B1)	5% 0.055 mg
Riboflavin (B2)	6% 0.08 mg
Niacin (B3)	3% 0.525 mg
Pantothenic acid (B5)	2% 0.075 mg
Vitamin B6	4% 0.061 mg
Folate (B9)	16% 64 μg
Choline	1% 5.7 mg
Vitamin C	21% 18.8 mg
Vitamin E	4% 0.55 mg
Vitamin K	173% 207 μg
Minerals	Quantity %DV^{†}
Calcium	6% 72 mg
Iron	8% 1.48 mg
Magnesium	5% 20 mg
Phosphorus	3% 37 mg
Potassium	9% 276 mg
Selenium	1% 0.6 μg
Sodium	1% 16 mg
Zinc	4% 0.39 mg
- Other constituents: Quantity
- Water: 89.8 g
- USDA Database entry values are for edible portion
- ^{†}Percentages estimated using US recommendations for adults, except for potassium, which is estimated based on expert recommendation from the National Academies.

== See also ==
- Allium tricoccum
- Chives
- Leek
- Onion
- Shallot
