= Gerceida E. Adams-Jones =

American physicist

- Born: Denver, Colorado
- Education: University of Michigan

Gerceida E. Adams-Jones is an American physicist, a clinical associate professor at New York University, and a faculty member at Pioneer Academics, an online research program for high school students connected with Oberlin College. In 1981, she became the first African-American woman to receive a B.S. degree in physical oceanography in the United States.

== Early life and education ==
Adams-Jones was born in Denver, Colorado, and grew up in Caruthersville, Missouri. She graduated in 1981 from the University of Michigan College of Engineering, becoming the first African-American woman with a bachelor's degree in physical oceanography. She went to New York University for graduate study, earning a master's degree in 1986 and completing a Ph.D. there in 1997.

== Contributions ==
In 2006, she and Makeda Watkins founded St. Albans Under the Stars, a community-based program that promotes science projects in underserved communities and assists in college readiness initiatives through a series of workshops designed to actively engage the student while "learning at play."

She is the author of the book The Science Behind Technology (Kendall Hunt Publishing, 2017).

== Recognition ==
Adams-Jones was named a Fellow of the American Physical Society in 2021 "for publicly addressing inequities in science education in physics and astronomy through the development of curricular materials and community activities, particularly within inner-city communities".
