= Pioneer Academics =

Online institute for American high school students

- Founded: 2012 in Jenkintown, Pennsylvania, United States
- Founders: Matthew Jaskol; Amy Li
- Type: Institute
- Headquarters: Jenkintown, Pennsylvania, United States
- Website: pioneeracademics.com

Pioneer Academics is an institute for high school students with headquarters in Jenkintown, Pennsylvania.

== History ==
Pioneer Academics was co-founded by Matthew Jaskol and Amy Li in 2012. The program began with four high school students and two college professors. The stated goal was to provide high school students with access to original research opportunities with university faculty. In its early years, a large portion of participants were from East Asia. In 2016, Pioneer Academics entered into a partnership with Oberlin College. Through the agreement, Oberlin provided access to its library resources and began granting college credit to students who completed the Pioneer research program. In 2023, Pioneer launched the Global Problem-Solving Institute (GPSI), a program focused on collaborative, interdisciplinary projects.

== Operations ==
Pioneer Academics operates entirely online. While its headquarters is in Jenkintown, Pennsylvania, its staff and faculty mentors are geographically distributed. Through the partnership with Oberlin College, students who complete the research program earn college credit. The academic curriculum and evaluation methods are subject to periodic review. Oberlin College faculty conduct annual reviews of the main research program.

The primary program is the Pioneer Research Program, a research mentorship for high school students. Participants are placed in small seminars led by a professor. The program is divided into two phases. In the first phase, students engage in background reading and topic refinement. In the second phase, each student works individually with the professor to conduct research and write an undergraduate-level research paper, typically 15–30 pages in length. Students receive access to university library databases and writing support. Upon successful completion, students earn four college credits from Oberlin College.

Introduced in 2023, the Global Problem solving Institute (GPSI) is a program centered on collaborative, interdisciplinary projects. Students work in teams, coached by faculty mentors, to develop solutions for complex problems in areas such as public health or technology. The program is reviewed for academic quality through a partnership with the University of North Carolina at Chapel Hill (UNC-CH) and offers two college credits from UNC-CH.

Since 2022, Pioneer Academics has organized an annual Co-Curricular Summit, a free online event for high school students, parents and educators. Programming combines panel sessions on academic research, co-curricular learning and college admissions with a virtual college and program fair at which representatives of universities and pre-college programs answer questions from attendees. The first summit was held on September 30 and October 1, 2022, and was keynoted by the author Warren Berger. The second summit, held on September 30, 2023, used the theme "The New Frontier" and featured the journalist Frank Bruni as keynote speaker, together with a college fair involving representatives of 15 universities. Later keynote speakers included the education researcher Tony Wagner at the third summit in 2024 and the author Diana Kander at the fourth, held on September 6, 2025 under the theme "To Lead Is to Learn". The fifth summit, held online on September 19, 2026 under the theme "Cultivating Wisdom", had the physician-geneticist Francis Collins as keynote speaker and the journalist Daniel Golden as plenary speaker.
