= Turetzky =

Turetzky is a surname. Notable people with the surname include:

- Bertram Turetzky (born 1933), American musician
- Herb Turetzky (1945–2022), scorer for the Brooklyn Nets
