= Whitestone Point Light =

Lighthouse in Queens, New York

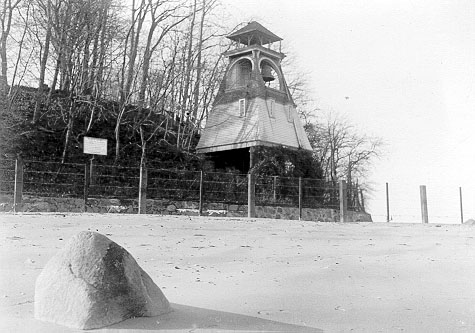
- Whitestone Point Post Light, 1915
- Location: Whitesone Point, Southerly side of East River, New York
- Coordinates: 40°48′06″N 73°49′10″W

Tower
- Construction: Steel
- Height: 20 feet (6.1 m)
- Shape: Square pyramidal frame tower on piers; lower part, white; upper, wood-color (1889); black skeleton tower (post-1915)
- Fog signal: Bell struck by machinery a double blow every 30 seconds

Light
- First lit: 1889
- Deactivated: Active
- Focal height: 56 feet (17 m)
- Lens: Lens lantern
- Range: 3 nautical miles (5.6 km; 3.5 mi)
- Characteristic: Fixed white

Whitestone Point Light is located in Whitestone, Queens.
