= John McHugh Sr. =

American World War II veteran (1924–2019)

John F. McHugh Sr.
- John McHugh Sr.
- Born: John F. McHugh Sr. March 6, 1924; Union City, New Jersey, U.S.
- Died: July 21, 2019 (aged 95); Whitestone, New York, U.S.
- Spouse: Rosie McGee (August 16, 1947)
- Children: John, Brian, Tim
- Military career
- Allegiance: United States
- Branch: United States Army Air Force
- Service years: 1942-1946
- Rank: Corporal
- Unit: 1st Infantry Division
- Conflict: World War II: D Day invasion; Battle of Normandy; Battle of the Bulge
- Awards: *Silver Star *Bronze Star
- Other work: Transit Authority conductor *Private investigator

John McHugh Sr. (March 6, 1924 – July 21, 2019) was an American World War II veteran who participated in the D Day invasion, the Battle of Normandy and the Battle of the Bulge. He was in the 1st Infantry Division and was awarded the Silver Star and Bronze Star. The State of New York placed him in its Veterans Hall of Fame. His hometown Whitestone, New York has co-named a street after him.

== Military service ==
The 1st Infantry Division's combat service identification badge (CSIB)

After high school graduation in 1942 McHugh was drafted and completed basic training at Fort McClellan in Alabama. After basic training, he went to New York and was transported on the Queen Elizabeth to the United Kingdom. McHugh was in the 1st Infantry Division which landed at Normandy on D-Day and went on to fight at the Battle of Normandy and the Battle of the Bulge. The State of New York placed him in its Veterans Hall of Fame.

=== D-Day Invasion ===
McHugh and the First Infantry Division (also known as Big Red One) arrived in landing craft at Omaha Beach on D-Day, June 6, 1944, at 7:30am. McHugh and roughly 10 soldiers disembarked. As soon as they exited the landing craft, it was destroyed by a German shell. McHugh had been assigned to carry a tripod for a machine gun, however the soldier carrying the machine gun was killed in action so McHugh began crawling up the beach without a weapon. He spent the day in the sand avoiding German gunfire.

Referring to his own experience on D-day, McHugh said, "It's hell day, it really is a hell day. Scared stiff, petrified and running like hell… It was a lot of bodies around, I didn't want to be one of them." His experience has been cited as emblematic of the dire experiences and vanishing memories of D-Day vets. McHugh sent the money that he earned in the army to his mother (Catherine); his father John was deceased.

=== Post war ===
When the war ended, he was in the Army of Occupation. After seven months he was honorably discharged with the rank of corporal.

=== Awards ===
- Silver Star
- Bronze Star
- Army Presidential Unit Citation Presidential unit citations for the Battle of Crucifix Hill and Battle of Hürtgen Forest
- World War II Victory Medal
- Army of Occupation Medal
- European-African-Middle Eastern Campaign Medal
- Silver Arrowhead for his participation in the invasion of Normandy.
- Fort Eger badge - awarded by Belgium for McHugh's efforts during the war in Belgium.

== Later life and death ==
After the war, McHugh worked as a Transit Authority conductor and a private investigator for a security firm.

McHugh died in his sleep July 21, 2019 at his home in Whitestone, New York. His hometown Whitestone New York approved a street co-named in honor of McHugh in 2019.

== Personal life ==
McHugh was a first generation American, born in Union City, New Jersey; his parents were Irish immigrants. He came from a long line of soldiers. His father (John McHugh) fought in World War I and was shot six times in the Battle of the Argonne forest and also gassed. McHugh's grandfather fought in the American Civil War.

After World War II ended, John McHugh Sr. returned to the United States and married his childhood sweetheart Rosie McGee on August 16, 1947. Together they had three sons: John, Brian and Tim. He had three grandchildren and seven great-grandchildren.

== See also ==
- Operation Overlord
- Normandy landings
- Liberation of France
- German occupation of Luxembourg during World War II
- Operation Spring Awakening
