= Calçot =

Catalan green onion plant or vegetable

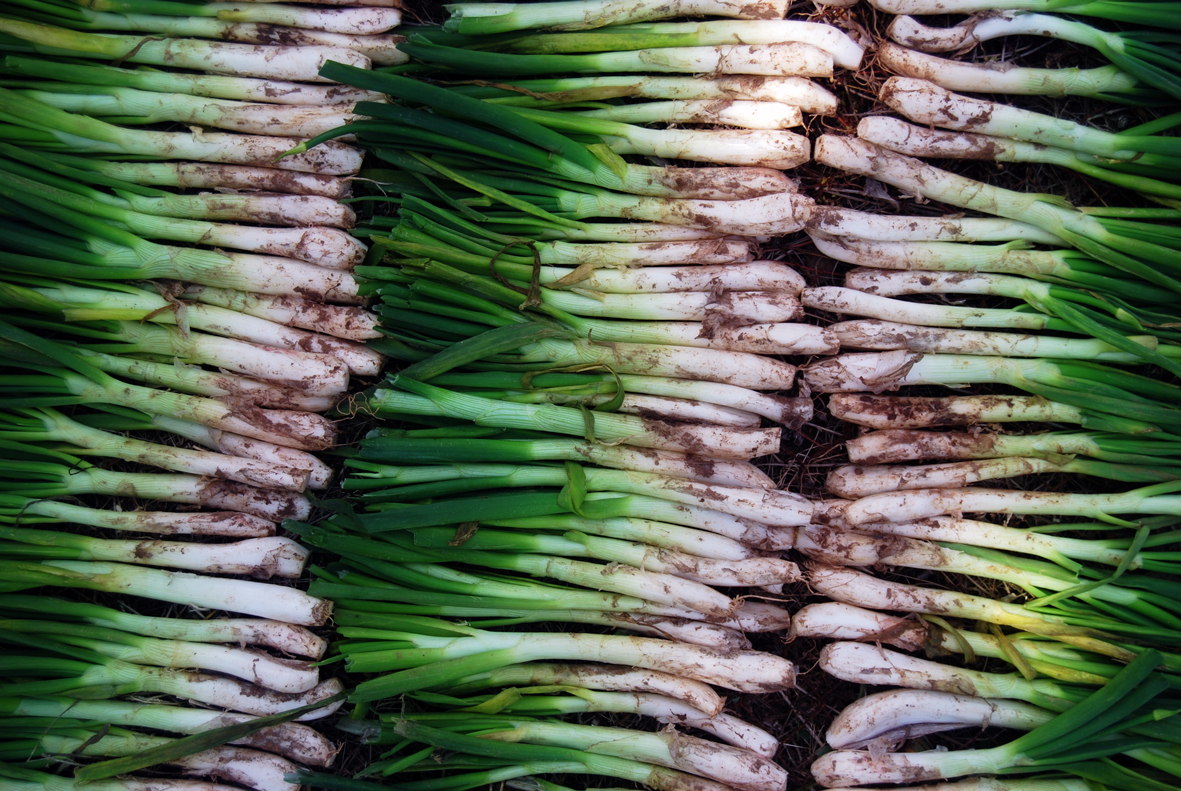
- Species: Allium cepa
- Cultivar: Calçot
- Origin: Catalonia

Calçot (Catalan: [kəlˈsɔt]) is a type of green onion. The name calçot comes from the Catalan language. The calçot from Valls (Catalonia) is a registered EU Protected Geographical Indication.

Calçots are milder and less bulbous than onions and have a length of between 15 and 25 cm (white part) and a diameter of 1.7 to 2.5 cm at the root. Planted in trenches, like an onion, as a single bulb, and successively increasing the depth of the soil around the stems throughout autumn and winter (see earthing up), they sprout into 4–10 shoots, roughly the shape of small leeks or scallions.

The origin of the calçot and its cooking method is in the town of Valls, where an annual event celebrates the harvest of calçots. Nowadays, thousands of eating gatherings centered around the calçots, called calçotades (singular: calçotada), are celebrated around Catalonia. In these events, they are grilled over a hot fire, wrapped up in newspaper, served on terra cotta tiles and eaten, after peeling with bare hands, by dipping them one by one in special sauce (made with almonds).

== Etymology ==
The origin of the word calçot comes from the Catalan term calçar, which corresponds to hilling. Hence the word "calçot" roughly mean "that which has been hilled". This is because calçots get their characteristic shape and texture from this process.

The word "calçar" itself literally means "to shoe", and ultimately derives from the Latin calceus, a type of footwear that covered the ankle and lower shin - hence its use by analogy in this context.

== Origin ==
The origin of the variety is disputed, but one of the most commonly accepted versions of its history is that they were developed by Xat de Benaiges, a peasant farmer from Valls around the turn of the 20th century. He is said to have been the first to have planted the sprouts of garden onions, covering them with earth so a longer portion of the stems remained white and edible.

== Calçotada ==
The most traditional way of eating calçots is at a calçotada (plural: calçotades), a gastronomical celebration held between November and April, where barbecued calçots are consumed in massive quantities.

In a typical event, calçots are grilled until the outer layers are charred, then wrapped in newspaper to steam, served on terra cotta tiles and eaten after peeling off the charred skin with bare hands and dipping the white portion in a special sauce (similar to romesco and to salvitxada). The green tops are discarded. It's customary to wear a large bib for the sauce stains. The calçots can be accompanied by red wine or cava sparkling wine. Pieces of meat and bread slices are often roasted in the charcoal after cooking the calçots. For dessert, a typical choice is oranges and white cava.

== Gallery ==
Calçot

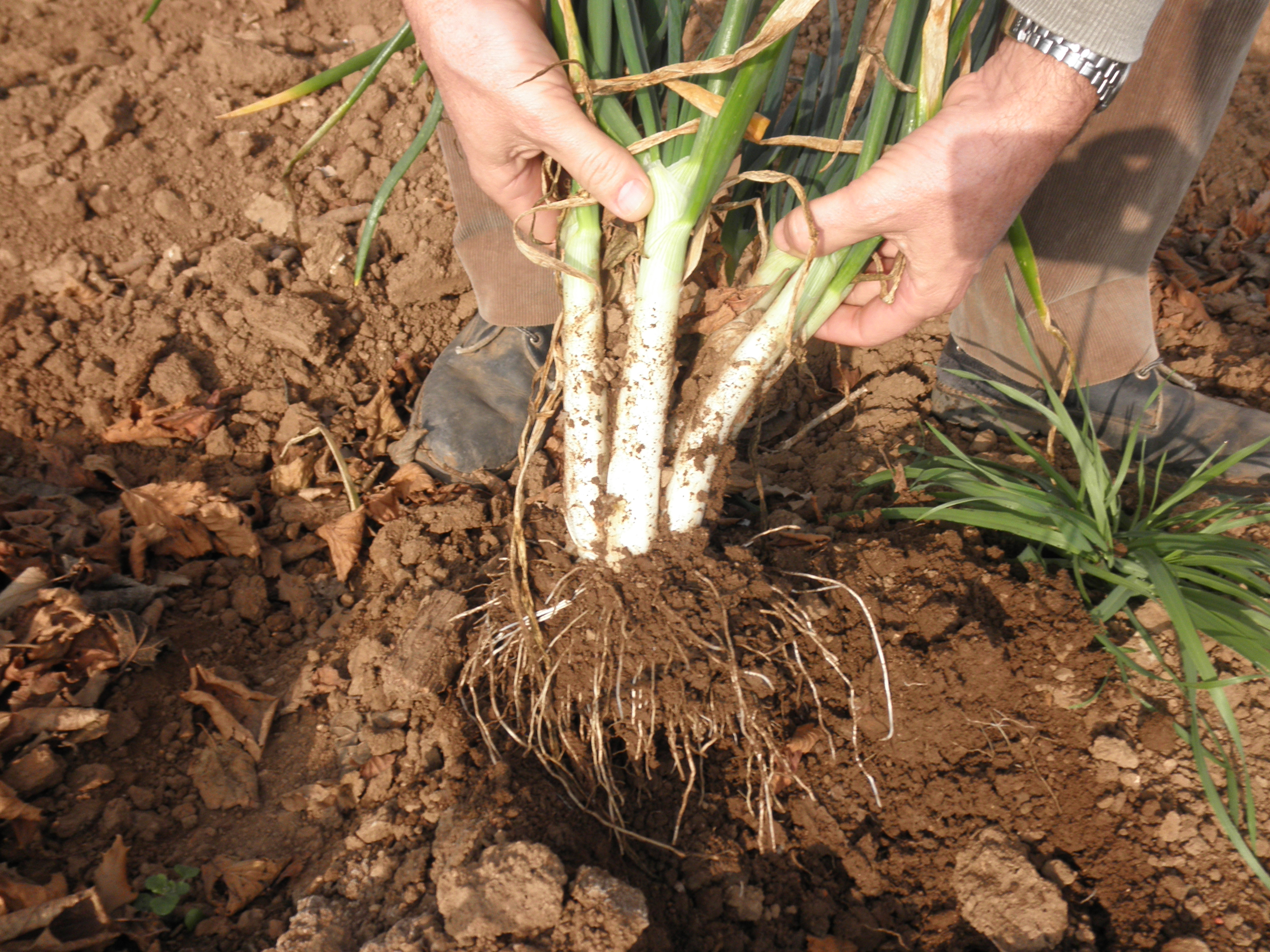
Pulling up calçots

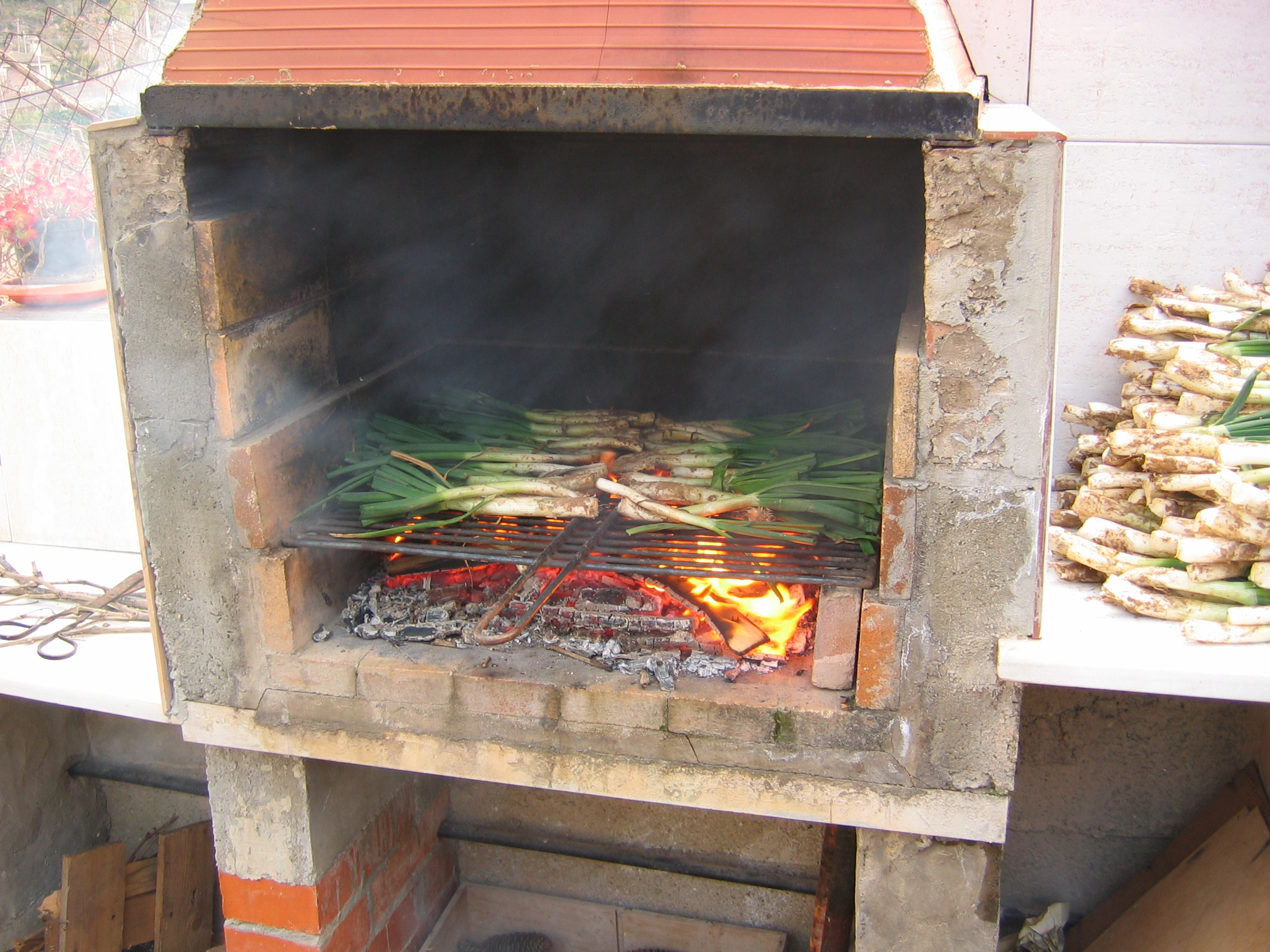
Calçots roasting during a calçotada

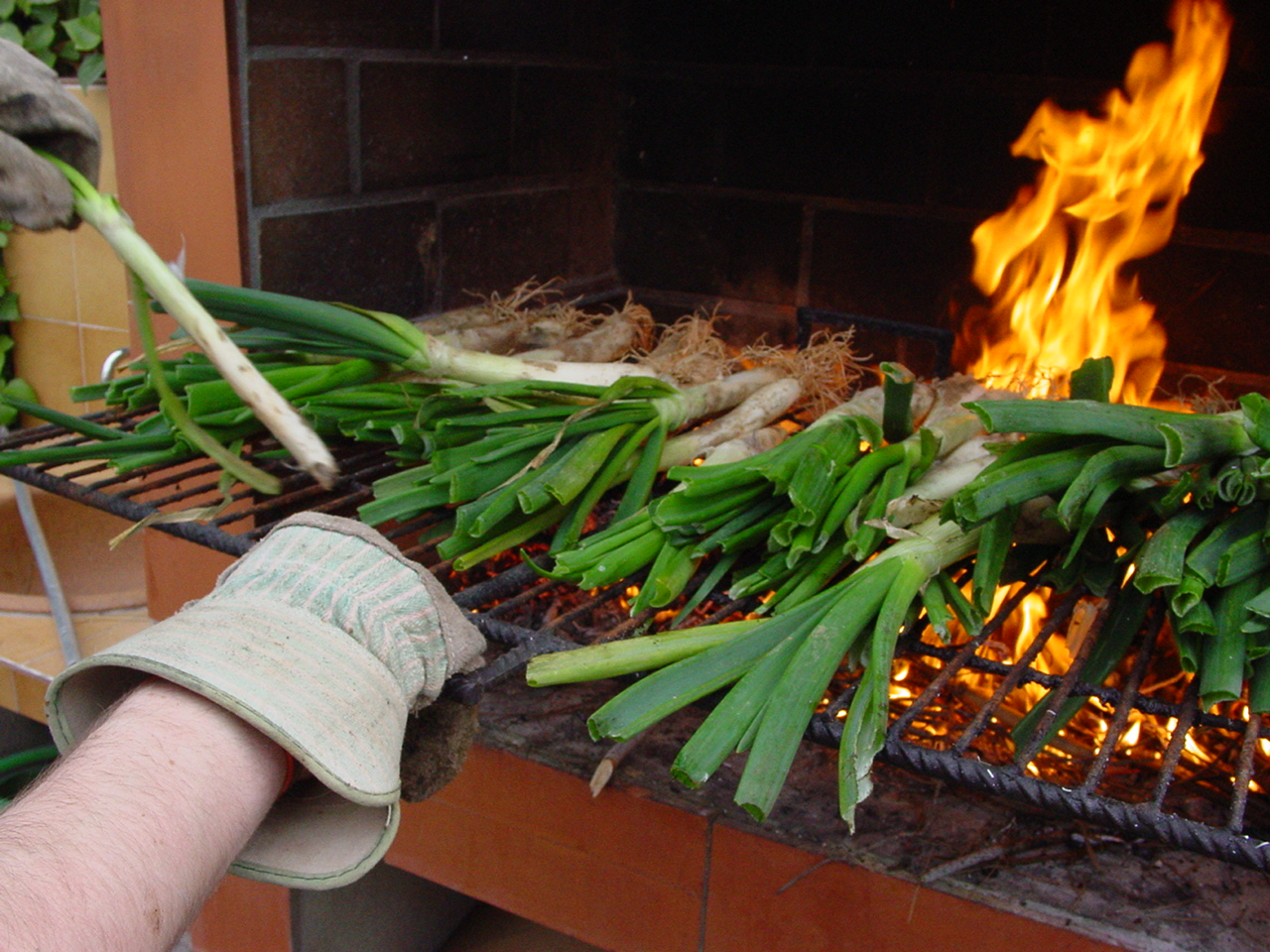
Handling Calçots

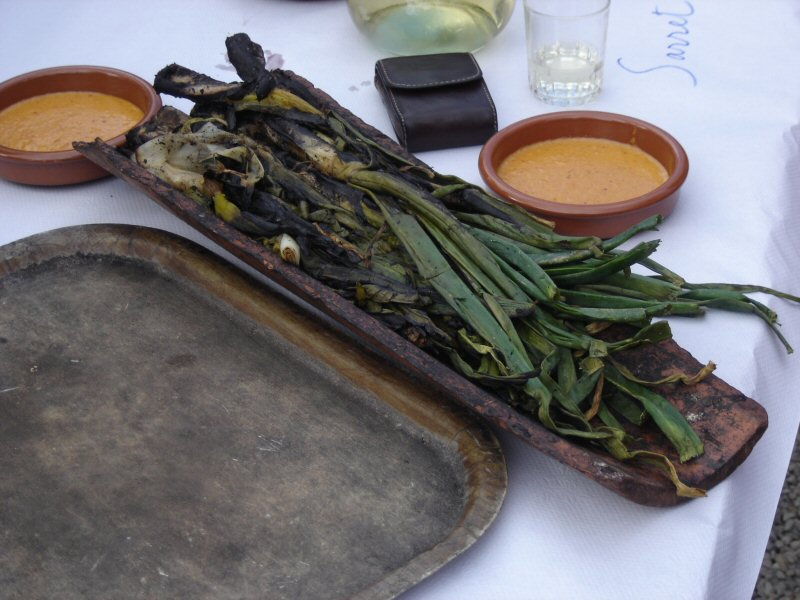
Roasted calçots with sauce for dipping

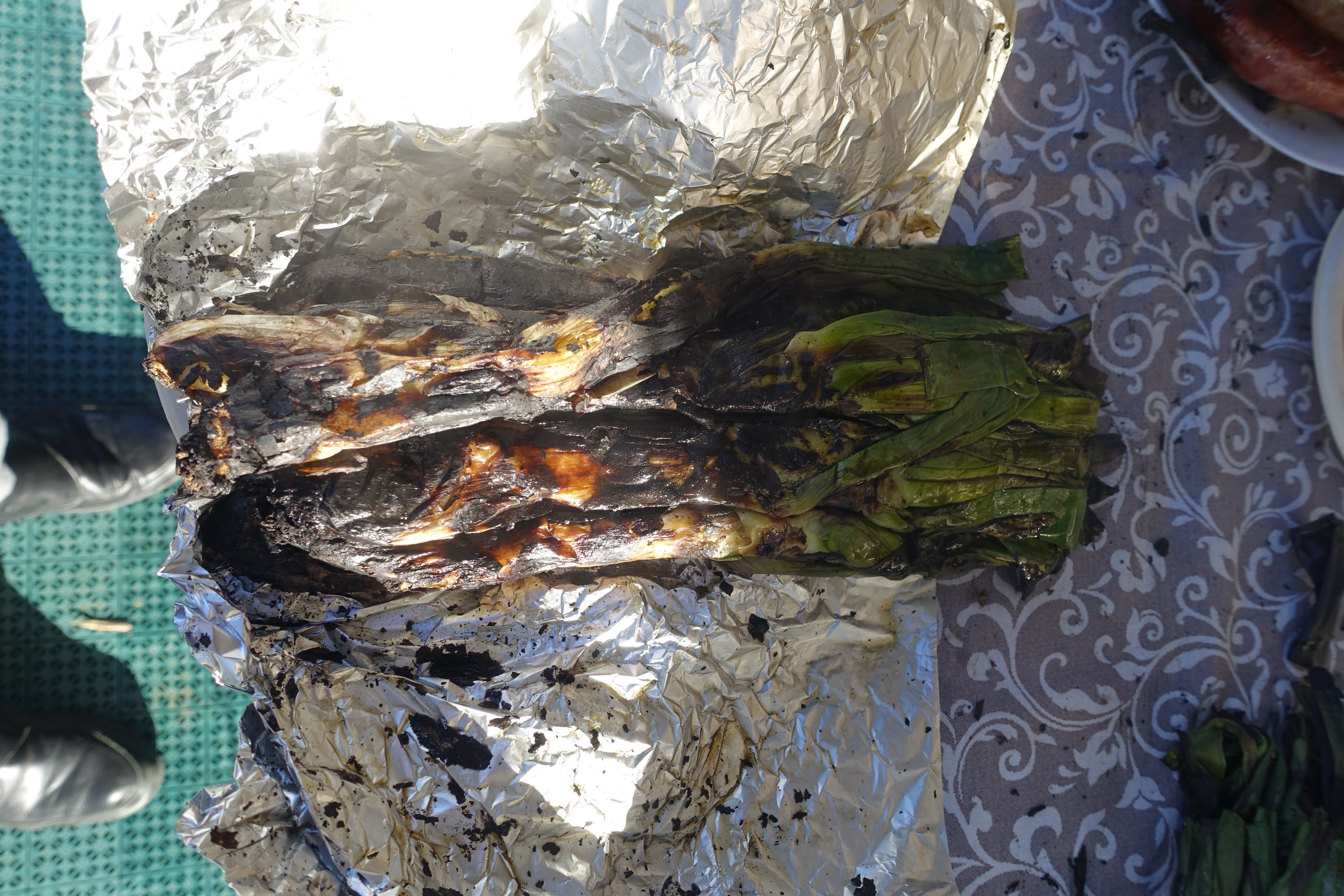
Calçots in Catalonia

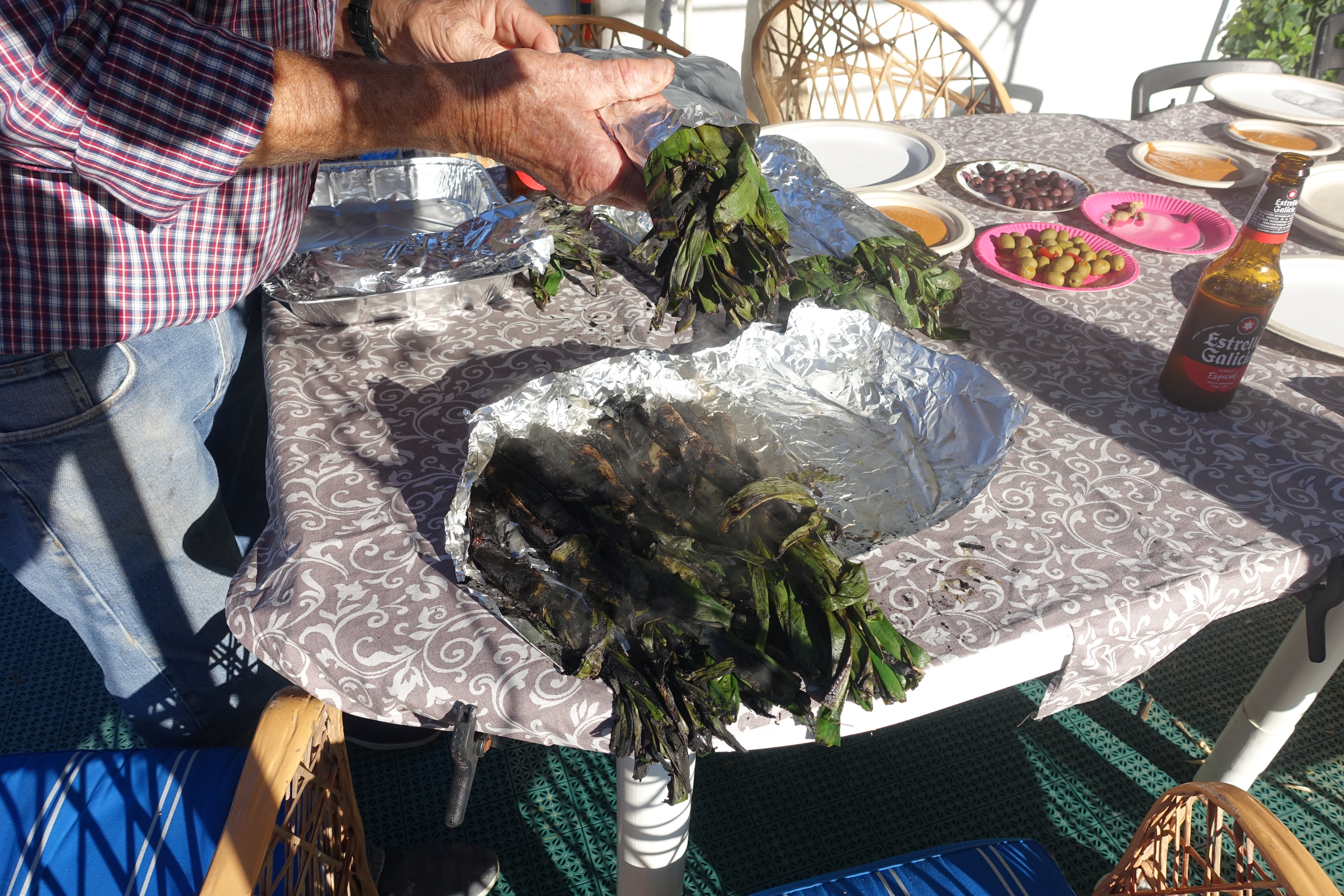
Calçots, grilled

== See also ==
- Traditions of Catalonia
- Ramps, another species of Allium around which festivals are held
