= Romesco =

Catalan sauce of tomatoes, garlic, and nuts

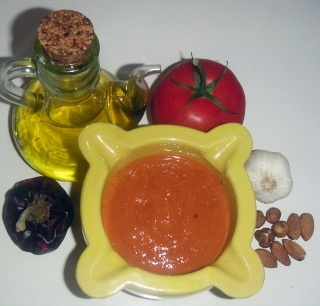
- A dish of romesco sauce surrounded by typical romesco ingredients such as tomato, olive oil, and garlic
- Type: Sauce
- Place of origin: Serrallo, Tarragona, Spain
- Main ingredients: tomato, garlic, nuts

Romesco (Catalan pronunciation: [ruˈmɛsku]) is a tomato-based sauce that originated from Valls in Catalonia. The fishermen in this area made this sauce to be eaten with fish. It is typically made from any mixture of roasted tomatoes and garlic, toasted almonds, pine nuts, and/or hazelnuts, olive or sunflower oil, and nyora peppers (a sun-dried, small, round variety of red bell pepper). Flour or ground stale bread may be used as a thickener or to provide texture. Other common ingredients include sherry vinegar, red wine vinegar, and onions. Leaves of fennel or mint may be added, particularly if served with fish or escargot. It is very often served with seafood, but can also be served with a wide variety of other foods, including poultry, some red meats like lamb, and vegetables.

According to food writer Melissa Clark, cookbook author Penelope Casas was considered the recognized authority on romesco recipes for English-speaking readers. When touring Catalonia, though, Clark discovered that there was no single correct recipe and encountered several variations. Clark described romesco as "a rich and piquant purée made from sweet dried Spanish peppers along with tomato, garlic, almonds, vinegar, and oil, pounded with breadcrumbs as a binder". Some variations were thick, others were thin, and one substituted crushed almond biscotti for the almonds and bread crumbs and incorporated hard-boiled eggs. Clark's version uses hazelnuts instead of almonds.

Romesco sauce is often confused with similar sauces, particularly salsa de calçots or salvitxada. During the springtime, salsa de calçots is served as an accompanying dip for calçots, a spring onion typical to Catalonia, during traditional springtime calçot barbecues called "calçotades". During calçotades, calçots are roasted over an open fire until their outer layer is charred. The charred layer is then removed, and the tender part of the onion may be dipped into the sauce.

== See also ==
- allioli, an oil and garlic catalan sauce
- Salvitxada, a similar catalan sauce
