= Charles Kramer (attorney) =

American lawyer and author

Charles Kramer (1916 – March 23, 1988) was an American lawyer from New York City. He was an expert in medical malpractice law.

== Life and family ==
Kramer was born in Brooklyn in 1916. He graduated from St. John's University School of Law in 1937.

His son, Daniel (born c. 1952), also became a lawyer, and was later recognized for representing more compensation claims pro bono on behalf of 9/11 victims over a three-year period, than any other attorney or firm for victims who filed claims to the Victims Compensation Fund.

An avid art collector, Kramer donated five large collections, notably Picasso linocut prints to the Metropolitan Museum of Art; Edvard Munch's surrealist prints and self-portraits to the Tel Aviv Museum of Art; and works by M.C. Escher to the Israel Museum.

He died on March 23, 1988, at Mount Sinai Medical Center in Manhattan, of a heart attack, at age 72. At the time of his death he lived in Whitestone, Queens. He was survived by his wife, son, two daughters, a sister, and six grandchildren.

== Career ==
He established the Manhattan law firm Kramer & Dillof, in 1950, with his former law clerk Henry Dillof. Thomas A. Moore joined the firm as a partner in 1978. The following year, his son, Daniel joined the firm, after graduating from Kramer's alma mater, and Judy Livingston joined its office staff, following her law school graduation. In 1989, Stanley Tessel retired from, then Kramer, Dillof, Tessel, Duffy & Moore, and Livingston became a partner, later forming Kramer, Dillof, Livingston & Moore (KDLM).

== Works ==
Kramer wrote four books on medical malpractice, the last of which he co-wrote with his son, attorney Daniel Kramer. Father and son also co-authored a monthly column in the New York Law Journal, titled Medical Malpractice.

Works include:

- The Medical Aspects of Negligence Cases; Practising Law Institute; 1953
- Medical Malpractice; Practising Law Institute; 1962
- The Negligent Doctor. Medical malpractice in and out of hospitals and what can be done about it; Crown Publishers; 1968
- Evidence in Negligence Cases; Practising Law Institute; 1981

== Affiliations ==
Kramer was a director of the New York State Trial Lawyers Association, a fellow of the International Academy of Trial Lawyers, and a member of the Inner Circle of Advocates. He served as president of the Laurelton Jewish Center in Queens.
