= Westlawn Institute of Marine Technology =

Location
- 243 Washington Street; Bath, Maine 04530; United States; 43°53′39″N 69°48′59″W

Information
- Established: 1930 (96 years ago)
- Website: www.westlawn.edu

The Westlawn Institute of Marine Technology is a distance-learning school of yacht design in Bath, Maine, United States, established in 1930. Graduates of the school receive the Westlawn Diploma in Naval Architecture, Marine Engineering and Yacht Design.

The 320' three-masted schooner Eos was designed by Westlawn graduate Antonio Ferrer.

== History ==
Westlawn was founded in 1930 by boat designers E. S. Nelson and Gerald Taylor White. They named it Westlawn after the farm of White's in Montville, New Jersey.

The school was purchased in December 2014 by David Smyth, a Westlawn alumnus. It was formerly owned by the American Boat and Yacht Council.

== Notable alumni ==
- Al Spalding
- Tom Fexas
