= Penelope Casas =

Penelope Casas (May 25, 1943 – August 11, 2013) was an American food writer, cookbook author and expert on the cuisine of Spain. Casas began authoring a series of English-language cookbooks focusing on the food of Spain during the 1980s, effectively introducing Americans to Spain's culinary heritage for the first time.

Casas released her first cookbook, The Foods and Wines of Spain, in 1982. Her first book is still in print, as of 2013. She would publish five more in-depth books and cookbooks on Spanish cuisine. Her follow-up book, Tapas: The Little Dishes of Spain, released in 1985, introduced a large American audience to the concept of tapas and tapas bars for the first time. Casas's last book was La Cocina de Mama: The Great Home Cooking of Spain in 2005.

Casas was born Penelope Fexas to Greek immigrant parents, Antonia and Achilles Fexas, on May 25, 1943, in Whitestone, Queens, New York City. Her only brother, Tom Fexas, was a yacht designer. She met her husband, Luis Casas, while studying abroad in Spain as a Vassar College student during the 1960s. She has also studied at the University of Madrid.

Casas died from leukemia at her home in Manhasset, New York, on August 11, 2013, at the age of 70.
