= Herb Turetzky =

American basketball official scorer (1945–2022)

Herbert Stephen Turetzky (December 19, 1945 – April 4, 2022) was the official scorer for the Brooklyn Nets for 54 years, including all of its incarnations, starting with the franchise's inaugural game in 1967 at the Teaneck Armory, where they played as the New Jersey Americans.

Turetzky was born on December 19, 1945, and learned the process of keeping score at basketball games played at a Boys' Club in Brownsville, Brooklyn. While a student at Long Island University, Turetzky headed to the Teaneck Armory in Teaneck, New Jersey, on October 23, 1967, together with his wife-to-be, with free tickets to watch the New Jersey Americans play the Pittsburgh Pipers in their first game in the American Basketball Association, hoping to get a chance to see Brooklyn natives Connie Hawkins and Tony Jackson play. No official scorer had been arranged for the game in advance and Head Coach Max Zaslofsky of the Americans, who knew that Turetzky was qualified to fill the position, asked him to keep score of the game. Turetzky said "I'd love to" and continued in the role for decades. The Pipers went on to win that first game 110-107 and Turetzky "never left that seat since".

He kept his role as official scorer with the franchise after the team moved to Long Island (playing as the New York Nets), back to New Jersey in both East Rutherford and Newark (as the New Jersey Nets), and then to Brooklyn under their current name. He was the scorer at 1,465 straight regular season and playoff games from 1984 to 2018. The 2,206 NBA basketball games he scored through his last game in June 2021 was recognized by Guinness World Records as the most in league history. Turetzky formally retired in October 2021 after 54 years as the team's only official scorer. NBA referee Bob Delaney described Turetzky as "the Michael Jordan of scorekeepers".

A resident of Whitestone, Queens, Turetzky died on April 4, 2022, of primary lateral sclerosis at his home there.
