= Salvitxada =

Sauce from Catalan cuisine

Salsa de calçots
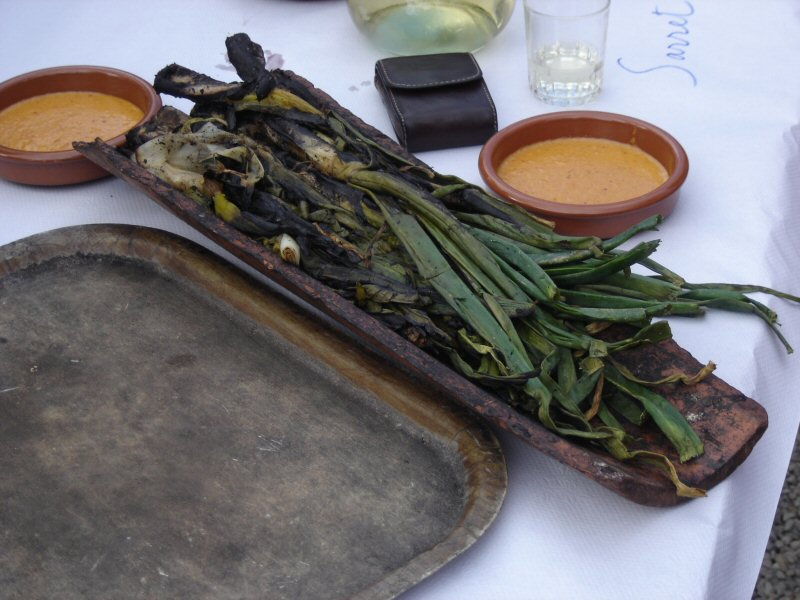
- Calçots with sauce.
- Alternative names: Salvitxada
- Type: Sauce
- Place of origin: Spain
- Region or state: Catalonia
- Associated cuisine: Catalan cuisine
- Main ingredients: Toast, garlic, vinegar

Salvitxada or salsa de calçots (calçot sauce) is a Catalan sauce originating in Valls, province of Tarragona in the region of Catalonia, which is served almost exclusively with calçots at the calçotades, a traditional local barbecue.

It is similar to romesco sauce with the difference that it is thickened with toast rubbed with fresh garlic, moistened with a little vinegar and pulverized.

== See also ==
- List of sauces
