= Tony Wagner =

American educator and author

Tony Wagner (born c. 1946) is an American educator and author. He is a Senior Research Fellow at the Learning Policy Institute. He held positions at Harvard University, where he co-directed the Change Leadership Group at the Harvard Graduate School of Education.

He is the author of eight books on education. His books, The Global Achievement Gap (2008), Creating Innovators (2012), and Most Likely to Succeed (2015), became international bestsellers.

He is best known for coining the concept of the "global achievement gap", the disconnect between what schools teach and what the modern economy demands of young people.

== Education ==
Wagner earned both a Master of Arts in Teaching (M.A.T.) and a Doctor of Education (Ed.D.) from the Harvard Graduate School of Education. He completed his doctoral studies between 1988 and 1992.

== Career ==
Wagner held positions at Harvard University for more than twenty years, including as founder and co-director of the Change Leadership Group at the Harvard Graduate School of Education.

He currently serves as a Senior Research Fellow at the Learning Policy Institute, founded by Linda Darling-Hammond in 2015.

== Reception ==
His 2008 book The Global Achievement Gap was reviewed in the Harvard Crimson and USA Today praised Creating Innovators (2012) as "a road map for parents."

== Bibliography ==
- How Schools Change (1994, 2nd ed.)
- Making the Grade: Reinventing America's Schools (2002)
- Change Leadership: A Practical Guide to Transforming Our Schools (2006, co-authored with Robert Kegan)
- The Global Achievement Gap (2008; updated edition 2014)
- Creating Innovators: The Making of Young People Who Will Change The World (2012)
- Most Likely to Succeed: Preparing Our Kids for the Innovation Era (2015, co-authored with Ted Dintersmith)
- Learning By Heart: An Unconventional Education (2020)
- Mastery: Why Deeper Learning Is Essential in an Age of Distraction (2025, co-authored with Ulrik Juul Christensen)
