= Fred Fear & Company =

American food and drink company

Fred Fear & Company was, at one time, the largest seller of pure maple syrup, clam juice, and Easter Egg colors in the United States. It was founded in 1892, and once operated plants in St. Johnsbury, VT, Brooklyn, NY, and Lewes, DE. In 1954, the company was acquired by the Childs Company.
