= Warren Berger =

American writer

- Born: October 20, 1958 (age 67); Whitestone, New York, U.S.
- Occupations: Writer; journalist

Warren Berger (born October 20, 1958) is an American journalist and author. He has written five books (two as co-authors) and numerous articles, primarily on design, mass media, and popular culture.

== Early life and education ==
Warren Berger grew up in Whitestone, New York, as the youngest of seven siblings. He graduated from Syracuse University's S. I. Newhouse School of Public Communications in 1980.

== Career ==
After working as a newspaper journalist in Dallas, Texas, Berger moved back to New York and worked for several years as a magazine editor for CBS.

In 1990, Berger began writing independently and went on to publish a number of pieces in The New York Times and other publications. He wrote a business column for the Sunday Times and regularly contributed culture articles to the Arts & Leisure section and The New York Times Magazine. GQ, The Los Angeles Times Magazine, The New York Times Magazine, Reader’s Digest, and Business 2.0 all featured Berger's writing, and he served as a contributing editor at Wired magazine from 1999 to 2001.

Berger pursued his interest in advertising by writing articles for Ad Age’s Creativity, Communication Arts, Graphics, and Metropolis. In the mid-1990s, he formed an association with The One Club for Art & Copy, helping them launch the bimonthly publication ONE, about creativity in advertising, and then in 2007 launching the quarterly One: Design. In 2001, he wrote his first book, "Advertising Today", published by Phaidon Press. The book was included on Barnes & Noble’s best books of the year list and was later included in a list of the “50 all time best books about media” compiled by The Independent of London.

He is the host of the website "AMoreBeautifulQuestion.com." Questioning is the topic of his two most recent books, The Book of Beautiful Questions (2018) and A More Beautiful Question (2014), both published by Bloomsbury.

== Bibliography ==
=== Nonfiction ===
- The Book of Beautiful Questions: The Powerful Questions That Will Help You Decide, Create, Connect, and Lead (2018; Bloomsbury Publishing) (ISBN 978-1632869562)
- A More Beautiful Question: The Power of Inquiry to Spark Breakthrough Ideas (2014; Bloomsbury Publishing) (ISBN 978-1620401453)
- CAD Monkeys, Dinosaur Babies, and T-Shaped People: Inside the World of Design Thinking and How It Can Spark Creativity and Innovation (2010; Penguin) (ISBN 978-0143118022) U.S. paperback edition of Glimmer
- Glimmer: How Design Can Transform Your Life and Maybe Even the World. Featuring the ideas and wisdom of design visionary Bruce Mau. (2009; The Penguin Press) (ISBN 978-1594202339)
- Nextville: Amazing Places to Live the Rest of Your Life (2008; Springboard Press); co-author with Barbara Corcoran (ISBN 978-0446178280)
- Hoopla: Crispin Porter + Bogusky (2007; PowerHouse Books) (ISBN 978-1576873120)
- No Opportunity Wasted: 8 Ways to Create a List for the Life You Want (2004; Rodale); co-author with Phil Keoghan of The Amazing Race (ISBN 978-1594864049)
- Advertising Today (2001; Phaidon Press) (ISBN 978-0714843872)

=== Fiction ===
- The Purples (2010; Ringer Books) (ISBN 978-0-615-23170-9)

=== Anthology ===
- The Best Business Stories of the Year (2001; Pantheon) (ISBN 978-0375725005)
