= Tom Fexas =

American yacht designer

- Born: 1941; Queens, New York
- Died: November 29, 2006 (aged 64–65); Stuart, Florida, U.S.
- Education: SUNY Maritime College (BS)
- Occupation: Yacht designer
- Spouse: Regina Fexas
- Relatives: Antonia Fexas (mother); Penelope Casas (sister)

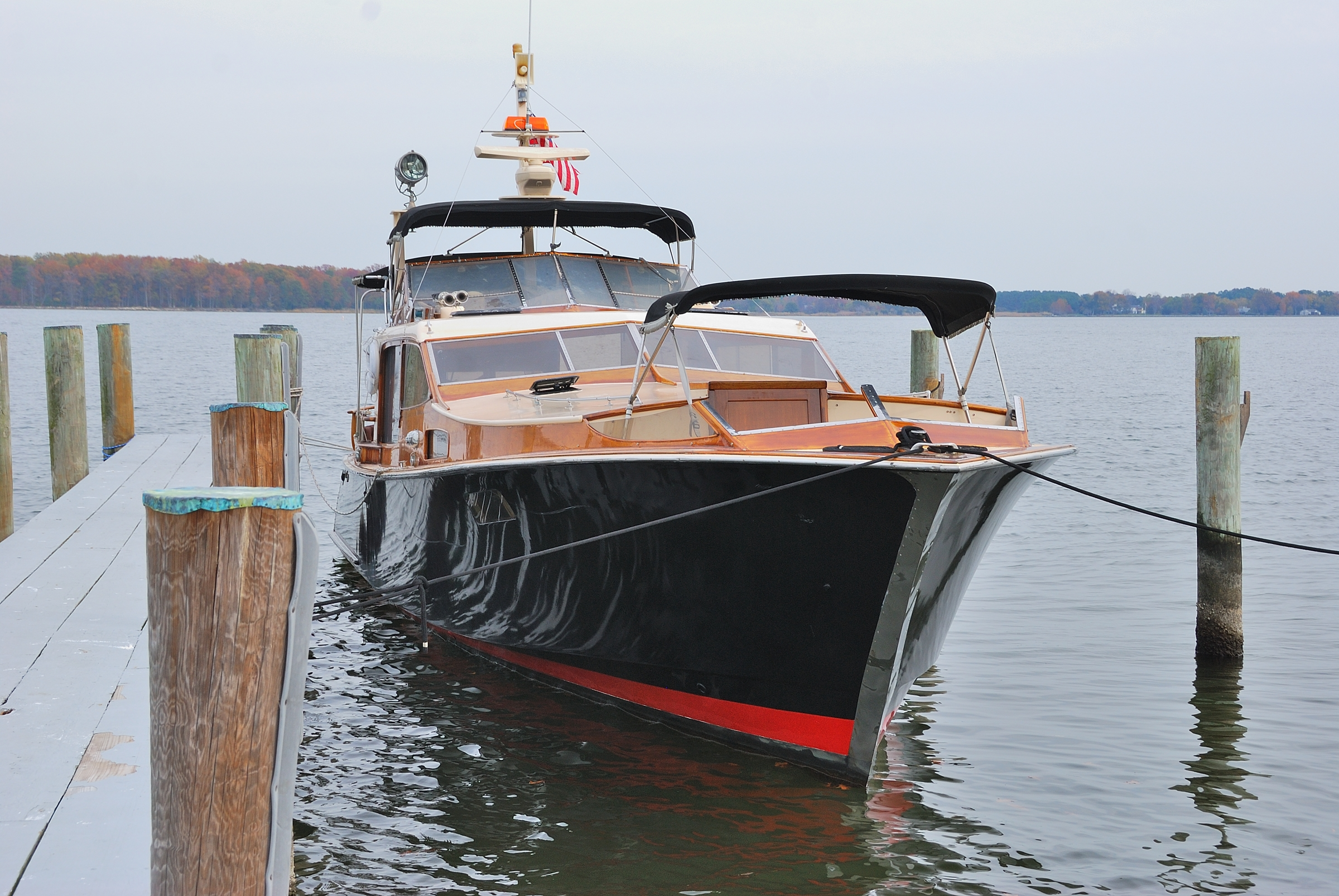
The original prototype of "Midnight Lace", built by Tom Fexas in 1978, shown here in 2014 on the Chesapeake Bay

Tom Fexas (1941 – November 29, 2006) was an American yacht designer who adopted a retro design from vintage commuter yachts of the 1930s to modern construction techniques. His design for Midnight Lace in 1978 helped launch a new movement that became known as Italian styling.

== Early life and career ==
Growing up in Queens, New York, Fexas was inspired to become a yacht-designer after watching the boats come in at Long Island Sound, and by time he spent on his family's yacht. Starting at age 7, Fexas spent time drawing and painting designs of yachts, and after completing his secondary education decided to pursue a degree in marine engineering at SUNY Maritime College. Upon graduation, Fexas took a position on the SS Independence as its third engineer, and finished the yacht design program from the Westlawn Institute of Marine Technology during the voyage. After returning from the Independence in 1965, Fexas moved to Mystic, Connecticut and took a position at General Dynamics Electric Boat designing submarines, while working on yacht design after work hours.

== Midnight Lace and following career ==
Fexas opened his own yacht design company, Tom Fexas Yacht Design, while continuing to work at Electric Boat on Ohio-class submarines. Fexas quit his Electric Boat position in 1972 (some sources list 1977) and dedicated his time towards designing the Midnight Lace, which was noticed and ordered by a client several years later. Upon completion of the Midnight Lace, Fexas moved to Fort Lauderdale, Florida, where his yacht premiered at the Fort Lauderdale Boat Show in 1978. The low profile, black boat was complimented for its use of wood (as opposed to most other yachts of that era) and its resemblance to older craft of the 1930s and 1940s, and the style became known as Italian styling.

After Fexas became notable for his work on Midnight Lace, he went into production with Chinese boat maker Cheoy Lee, and also worked with builders like Mikelson Yachts and Abeking & Rasmussen. He wrote articles for several magazines, and became the editor of (and monthly writer for) Power and Motoryacht in 1985, a position he held until 2003. Fexas also spent several years as a member of the Westlake Board of Directors, while continuing to run his yacht design company. Due to popular demand, Fexas redesigned Midnight Lace in 2003, and started work on constructing a new model before his death in 2006. His yacht design company was then run by his wife, Regina Fexas, and other former students of the Westlawn design course, until the luxury yacht market collapsed during the worldwide recession and Tom Fexas Yacht Designs was forced to close after 30 years in the business.

== Personal Life & Death ==
Fexas was married to Regina Fexas.

Fexas died in Stuart, Florida after being "hospitalized for an unidentified illness."
