= Bayside =

Bayside may refer:

== United States ==
- Bayside, California
- Bayside High School (disambiguation), several schools in the U.S. and Canada
- Bayside Marketplace, Miami, Florida
- Bayside Historic District, a sub-neighborhood of the Belle Meade neighborhood of Upper Eastside, Miami, Florida
- Bayside (Jeanerette, Louisiana), listed on the NRHP in Louisiana
- Bayside Historic District (Northport, Maine), listed on the NRHP in Maine
- Bayside, Maine, a residential zone in Northport, Maine
- Bayside, a neighborhood in Portland, Maine
- Bayside, Queens, New York, a neighborhood in New York City
  - Bayside (LIRR station), rail station in Queens
- Bayside, Texas
- Bayside, Accomack County, Virginia
- Bayside, Virginia Beach, Virginia
- Bayside, Wisconsin

== Canada ==
- Bayside, New Brunswick
- Bayside, Nova Scotia
- Bayside, Ontario

== Other places ==
- Bayside Comprehensive School, Gibraltar
- Bayside, Dublin, in Ireland
- City of Bayside, in the Australian State of Victoria, in the suburbs of Melbourne
- Bayside Council, a local government area in New South Wales, Australia

== Other uses ==
- Bayside (album), by Bayside
- Bayside (band), an American punk rock band
- Gav-Yam, also known as Bayside Land Corporation, and Israeli real estate company
- A purported Marian Apparation debunked by the Roman Catholic church, first reported by Veronica Lueken
- A fictional county in the movie The Legend of Billie Jean.
