= Bayside station =

Bayside station may refer to:

- Bayside station (LIRR), a Long Island Rail Road station in Queens, New York City, US
- Bayside Station, a monorail station on the Disney Resort Line in Tokyo, Japan
- College/Bayside station, a Metromover station in downtown Miami, Florida, US
- Bayside railway station, a railway station in Sutton, Dublin, Ireland

== See also ==
- Bayside (disambiguation)
