= Edward Grazda =

American photographer (born 1947)

- Born: 1947 (age 78–79)
- Education: Rhode Island School of Design
- Occupation: Photographer

Edward Grazda (born 1947) is an American photographer who grew up in Bayside, Queens. He studied photography at the Rhode Island School of Design. He has shot extensively throughout Mexico, Afghanistan, Pakistan, Latin America and Asia. His photographs are in the collections of The Museum of Modern Art, The Metropolitan Museum of Art, The New York Public Library, as well as The Corcoran Gallery of Art and The San Francisco Museum of Modern Art.
