= Lawrence Cemetery =

Cemetery in Queens, New York

Coordinates: 40.7633°N 73.7668°W

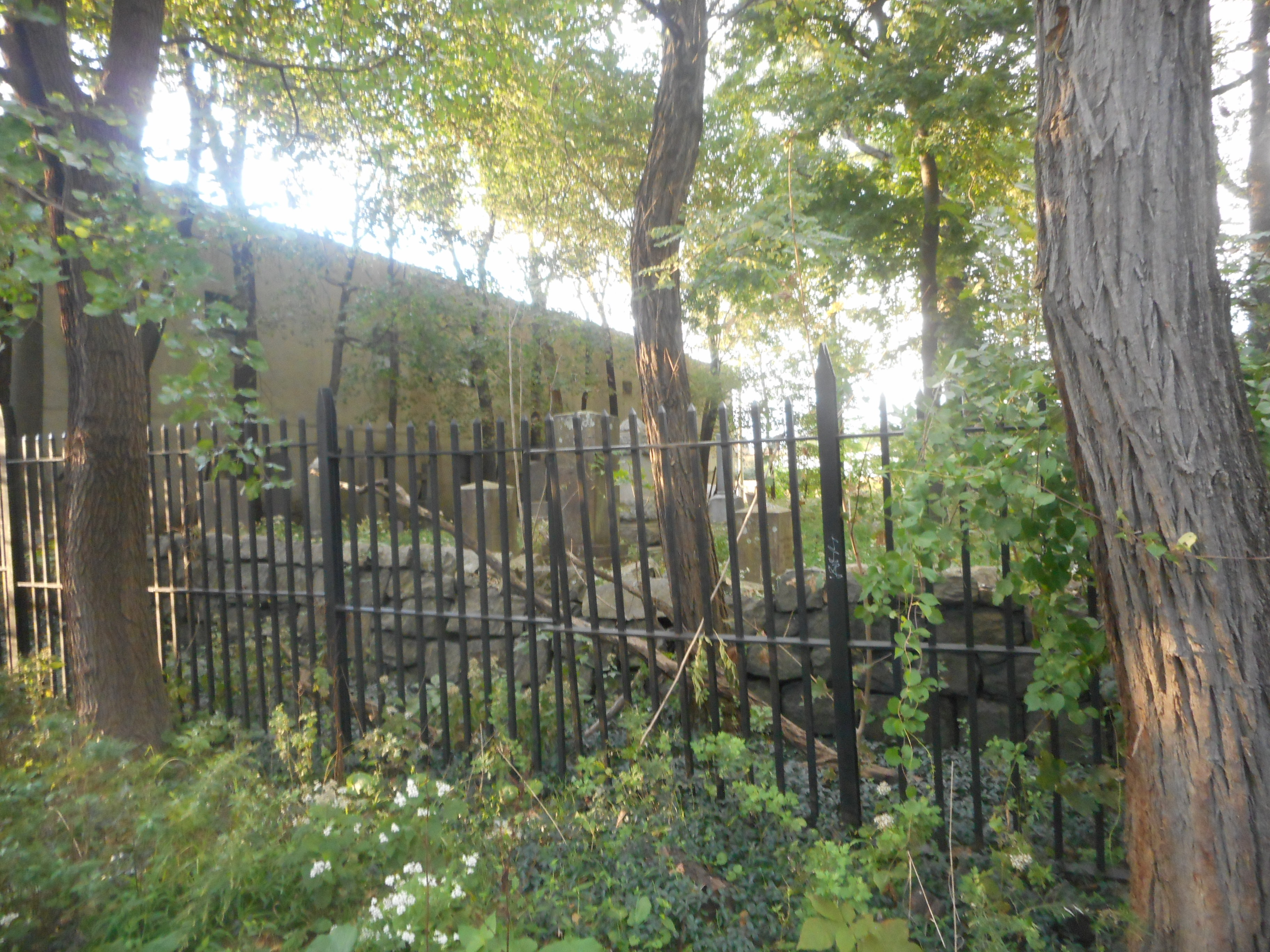

The Lawrence Cemetery is located at the corner of 216th Street and 42nd Avenue in Bayside, Queens, New York, United States. It is one of three (two still in existence) family burial grounds owned by the Lawrence family in Queens. It was designated as a New York City Landmark in 1967, and is managed today by the Bayside Historical Society.

== History ==
The Lawrence Cemetery (also known as the Lawrence Burying Ground or Lawrence Graveyard) is a family cemetery sited on part of the land deeded to John Lawrence (1618–1699) and his younger brother, William Lawrence (1622–1680), in 1645 by Governor Willem Keift. John Lawrence was New York City Mayor in the late 17th century, with terms beginning in 1672 and 1691.

For many years the Lawrence family used the land as a picnic ground called "Pine Grove." There are between forty and fifty graves, with burials beginning in 1832 and ending in 1939. Notable people buried in the cemetery include Cornelius W. Lawrence, Judge Effringham Lawrence, Frederick Newbold Lawrence, and Mary Nicolls Lawrence (second wife of Mayor Andrew H. Mickle.)

The New York City Landmarks Preservation Commission designated it as a landmark site on August 2, 1967. The designation document states:

the Lawrence Graveyard in Bayside, Queens is an important and impressive small burial plot situated in a tree-shrouded landscaped enclosure and ... it contains some handsome headstones marking the last remains of the descendants and heirs of a Seventeenth Century New York family associated with the historical, political and cultural growth of our City and our Country.
