= Auburndale, Queens =

Neighborhood in New York City

Auburndale
- Neighborhood of Queens
- Northern Boulevard and Francis Lewis Boulevard
- Interactive map of Auburndale
- Coordinates: 40.755°N 73.785°W
- Country: United States
- State: New York
- City: New York City
- County/Borough: Queens
- Community District: Queens 11
- Founder: L. H. Green
- Named for: Auburndale, Massachusetts
- Time zone: UTC−5 (EST)
  - Summer (DST): UTC−4 (EDT)
- ZIP Code: 11358
- Area codes: 718, 347, 929, and 917

Auburndale is an upper-middle-class neighborhood in the northern part of the New York City borough of Queens, between Bayside and Murray Hill.

The name comes from Auburndale, Massachusetts, the home of L. H. Green who developed the community starting in 1901, when the Long Island Rail Road (LIRR) started offering train service to the area. Today, the Auburndale station on the LIRR's Port Washington Branch continues to provide regular service to and from Manhattan.

Auburndale is located in Queens Community District 11 and its ZIP Code is 11358. It is patrolled by the New York City Police Department's 111th Precinct.

== Demographics ==
Based on data from the 2010 United States census, the population of Auburndale was 19,996, a decrease of 205 (1.0%) from the 20,201 counted in 2000. Covering an area of 785.35 acres (317.82 ha), the neighborhood had a population density of 25.5 inhabitants per acre (16,300/sq mi; 6,300/km^{2}).

The racial makeup of the neighborhood was 44.8% (8,954) White, 1.0% (209) African American, 0.1% (12) Native American, 40.9% (8,169) Asian, 0.0% () Pacific Islander, 0.1% (25) from other races, and 1.4% (284) from two or more races. Hispanic or Latino of any race were 11.7% (2,343) of the population.

== Architecture ==
The most common style of house in Auburndale is the Tudor. The Auburndale Improvement Association, along with other groups, seeks "to preserve the neighborhood’s small-scale, lawns-and-driveways character, which in some respects seems to have more in common with nearby suburban Nassau County than New York."

Along with Tudors, capacious Dutch colonials and Cape Cod houses also abound. Home prices range from $499,000 to roughly $1.5 million, averaging at around $650,000.

== Education ==
New York City Department of Education operates Auburndale's public schools. Francis Lewis High School is the largest public high school in the neighborhood.

Queens Public Library operates the Auburndale branch at 25-55 Francis Lewis Boulevard, as well as the East Flushing branch at 196-36 Northern Blvd.

== Transportation ==
Auburndale's highways include the Clearview Expressway (I-295) and the Long Island Expressway (I-495). Auburndale is connected to Manhattan, northern Queens and Long Island by the Auburndale station on the Long Island Rail Road's Port Washington Branch. The New York City Subway's 7 and <7> trains serves nearby Flushing at Flushing–Main Street station. New York City Bus's and MTA Bus Q12, Q13, Q16, Q26, Q27, Q28, Q30, Q31, Q75, Q76 local routes and the Nassau Inter-County Express' n20G and n20X routes also serves Auburndale.
