= Queens Community Board 11 =

Queens Community District 11
- Community District
- Country: United States
- State: New York
- City: New York City
- Borough: Queens
- Neighborhoods: List: Auburndale; Bayside; Douglaston–Little Neck; East Flushing; Hollis Hills; Oakland Gardens

Government
  - Chairperson: Paul DiBenedetto
  - District Manager: Joseph Marziliano

Area
  - Total: 9.4 sq mi (24 km^{2})

Population (2010)
  - Total: 116,431
  - Density: 12,000/sq mi (4,800/km^{2})

Ethnicity
  - African-American: 1.9%
  - Asian: 44.0%
  - Hispanic and Latino Americans: 11.5%
  - White: 40.5%
  - Others: 2.4%
- Time zone: UTC−5 (Eastern)
  - Summer (DST): UTC−4 (EDT)
- Area code: 718, 347, 929, and 917
- Police Precincts: 111th (website)
- Website: www1.nyc.gov/site/queenscb11/index.page

The Queens Community Board 11 is a local government in the New York City borough of Queens, encompassing the neighborhoods of Bayside, Douglaston–Little Neck, Auburndale, East Flushing, Oakland Gardens and Hollis Hills. It is delimited by Utopia Parkway to the west, 26th Avenue and Little Neck Bay to the north, the Nassau County border to the east and Horace Harding Expressway, Clearview Expressway and Grand Central Parkway to the south.
