= Auburndale station (LIRR) =

Long Island Rail Road station in Queens, New York

Auburndale
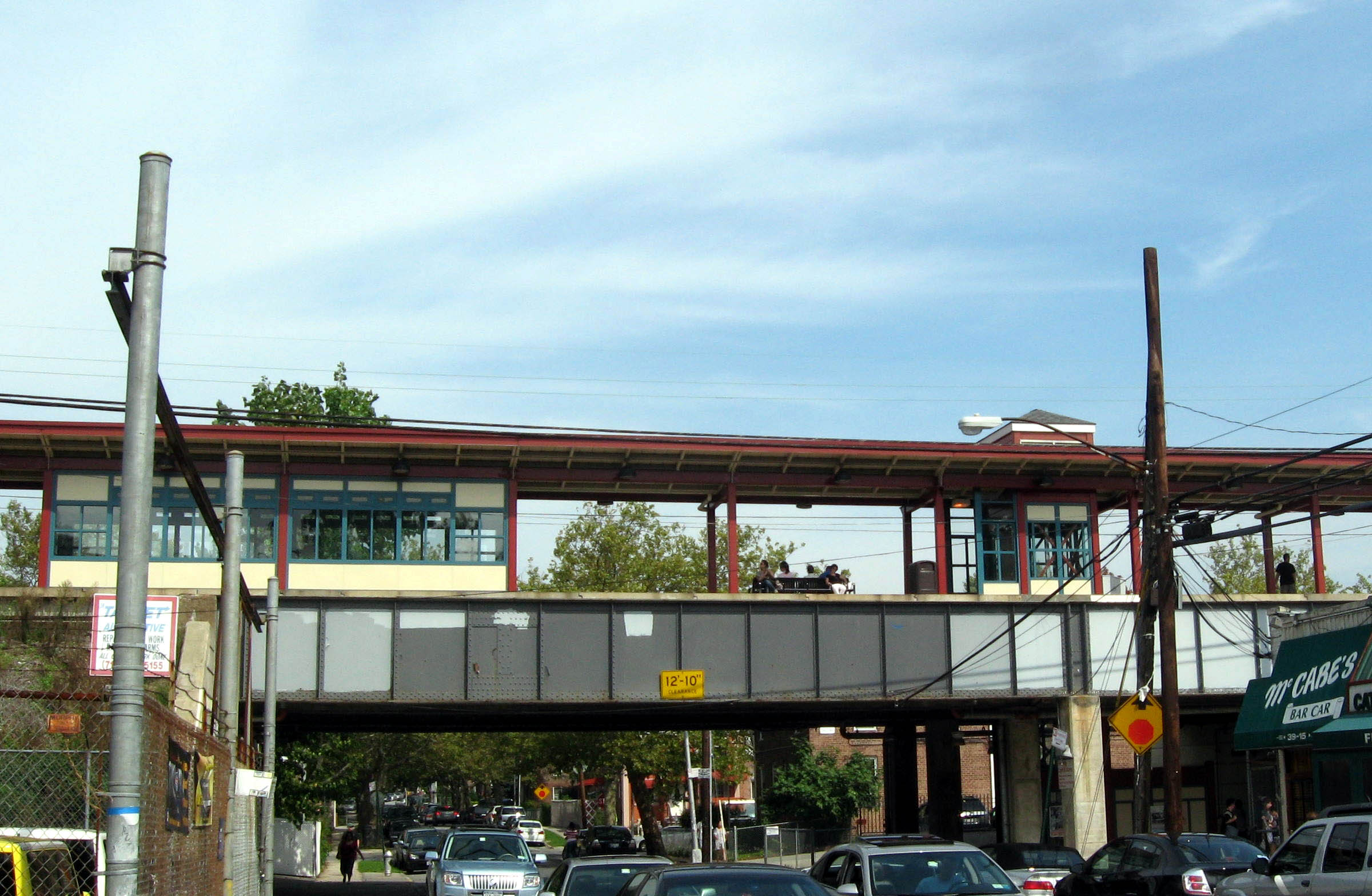
- Auburndale station over 192nd Street, looking north

General information
- Location: 192nd Street between Station Road and 39th Avenue; Auburndale, Queens, New York
- Coordinates: 40.76139°N 73.7905°W
- Owner: Long Island Rail Road
- Line: Port Washington Branch
- Distance: 9.9 mi (15.9 km) from Long Island City
- Platforms: 1 island platform
- Tracks: 2
- Connections: NYCT Bus: Q12, Q13, Q76; MTA Bus: Q28; Nassau Inter-County Express: n20G, n20X

Construction
- Parking: No
- Accessible: Yes

Other information
- Station code: ADL
- Fare zone: 3

History
- Opened: 1901
- Rebuilt: 1929, 2000–2003
- Electrified: October 21, 1913; 750 V (DC) third rail

Passengers
- 2012—2014: 2,907
- Rank: 38 of 125

Services
Preceding station	Long Island Rail Road	Following station
Broadway toward Penn Station or Grand Central	Port Washington Branch	Bayside toward Port Washington
Location

Auburndale is a station on the Long Island Rail Road's Port Washington Branch in the Auburndale neighborhood of Queens, New York City. The station is part of CityTicket. The station is located at 192nd Street between Station Road and 39th Avenue, two blocks north of Northern Boulevard.

== History ==
The Auburndale station was originally built as an infill station in 1901 – the year the community itself was developed. The original station house was sold and converted into an Episcopal Church on 42nd Avenue and Utopia Parkway when a new, elevated station was built between 1929 and 1930, as part of a grade crossing elimination project; this church closed in 1973.

By 1997, both Auburndale and the nearby Murray Hill station had fallen into a state of disrepair. The station subsequently underwent a significant reconstruction and modernization project between April 2000 and October 2003. As part of the $5.5 million project, funded in part through monies secured by then-New York State Senator Frank Padavan, included rebuilding the platform and expanding it from six to ten cars in length, new canopies, a new, heated waiting room, and making the station accessible to wheelchair users with the installation of an ADA-accessible elevator. The dilapidated, 1901-built station house was also demolished as part of the project.

Further accessibility upgrades to the station were completed in 2025 with the replacement of its elevator, making the station fully compliant with the Americans with Disabilities Act of 1990.

== Station layout ==
This station has one 10-car long island platform between the two tracks.
