= Stylianos Kalamaras =

American boxer

Personal information
- Occupation: Judoka

Sport
- Sport: Judo

Stylianos “The Spartan King" Kalamaras is a two sport athlete in both boxing and judo. As a judoka he trained out of Spartak Judo Club.

== Career ==
In 2003, he earned the USA Judo Jr. Athlete of the Year. Kalamaras would eventually earn 3x AAU Junior Olympic Games Gold Medalist 5x Jr. National Champion. He also won the 2015 Gold Gloves Light Heavyweight title.

At the age of 16, Kalamaras took time off of judo and became a boxer. In 2011, he competed in the Golden Gloves, but lost in the semi-finals. He did however beat Nicholous Perdomo in 2011, while competing in the 201 lb division. In 2012, he competed in the New York Golden Gloves while being trained by K-2 Boxing club. In 2013, he won the New York Metro Championships in knocking down his opponent in front of an energized Madison Square Garden crowd who were on their feet throughout the entirety of the fight. Kalamaras represented the Mendes Boxing Club during the New York Golden Gloves. where he went on to defeat five opponents to earn the Light Heavyweight title.

== Personal life ==
Kalamaras lives in Bayside, New York. He has been enlisted in the US Navy since 2010, and holds the rank of Second Class Petty Officer, while also attending college at Queens College.
