= 86th Scripps National Spelling Bee =

Spelling bee held in the United States in 2013

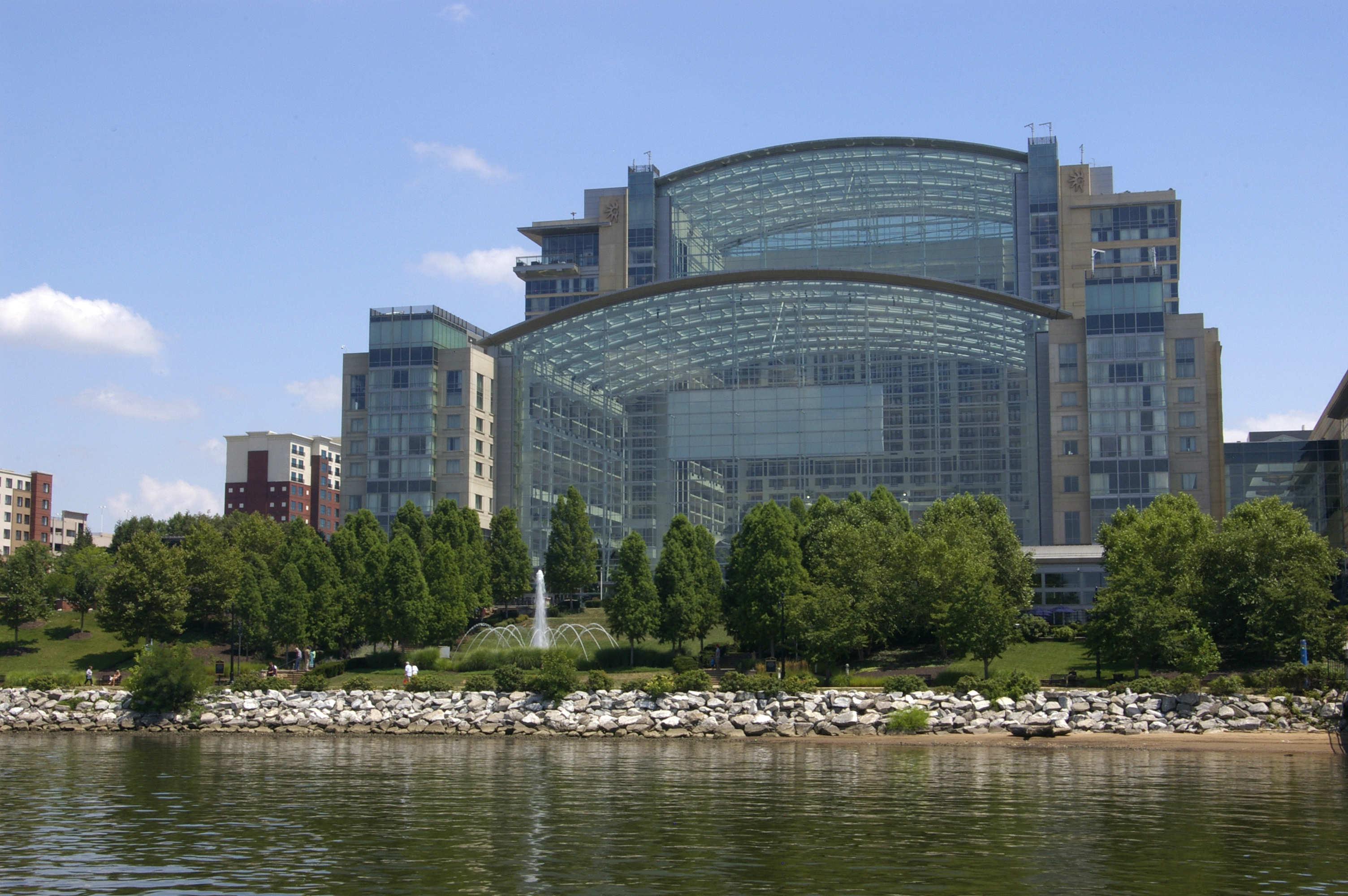
- Gaylord National Resort
- Date: May 28–30, 2013
- Location: Gaylord National Resort & Convention Center, National Harbor, Maryland
- Winner: Arvind Mahankali (13 at time of win)
- Sponsor: New York Daily News
- Sponsor location: New York City
- Winning word: knaidel
- No. of contestants: 281
- Pronouncer: Jacques Bailly

The 86th Scripps National Spelling Bee was held from May 28 to May 30, 2013 at the Gaylord National in National Harbor, Maryland and was broadcast live on ESPN3, ESPN2, and ESPN. For the first time, the competition included a vocabulary quiz in addition to the usual spelling challenge. Arvind Mahankali of Bayside, New York, won the competition and received the $30,000 grand prize. Including local feeder tournaments, an estimated 11 million children participated.

== Rule changes ==
In April 2013, shortly before the Bee, organizers announced that the preliminary test would now include multiple-choice vocabulary questions. While met with criticism by past contestants for deviating from the concept of a spelling bee, organizers indicated that the change was made to help avert perceptions that the competition was based solely on memorization skills (as had been showcased by television broadcasts), and to help further the Bee's goal of expanding the vocabulary and language skills of children. The change met with mixed reviews from contestants, many of whom questioned why it was not announced at the start of the school year instead of seven weeks before the competition.

== Elimination rounds ==
A total of 281 contestants qualified for the Bee, 134 boys and 147 girls, from age 8 to 14. The two youngest contestants were eight-year old Tara Singh of Kentucky and ten-year old Keshav Ramesh of Connecticut. Two contestants, Emily Keaton, of Pikeville, Kentucky, and Rachael Cundey, of Evans, Georgia, were five-time qualifiers; Keaton made her fourth appearance in the semifinals. On May 28, all contestants took a computerized spelling and vocabulary test. Two rounds of onstage spelling rounds were held the following day, where the field was cut down to 42 based on the scores of the preliminary tests and the results of the onstage rounds. All semifinalists received a preliminaries score of at least 32. On May 30, the field was cut from 42 to 11 finalists. Like the preliminary round, the semifinals included a multiple choice vocabulary test. According to the Associated Press, Amber Born was the "show-stealer" of the semifinals. Born made several jokes that led to laughter and applause from the audience; after watching a segment of her interview, Born spoke into the microphone before her word, "She seems nice". Also, three-time qualifier, Caleb Miller of Calhoun, Louisiana, amused the audience after announcing "ready as I'll ever be" before his first word in the semifinals and shockingly stating "you've got to be kidding me" after missing "cyanope". The semifinals aired live on ESPN2. Seventeen semifinalists from the 2013 competition were eligible for the 2014 edition with three (Margaret Peterson, Jonathan Caldwell, and Christopher O'Connor) being eliminated at the regional level.

== Finals ==
The finals were aired May 31, live on ESPN. The final eleven contestants included three from Florida, two from New York, two from Texas, and one from each of Illinois, Kansas, Massachusetts, and Utah. Of the 11, ten had previously made it to the National Spelling Bee. Among the eleven finalists was 11-year-old Vanya Shivashankar, whose older sister won Scripps previously. She was the youngest of the 11 finalists.

About ten minutes into the final, Nikitha Chandran of Florida misspelled pathognomonic and was eliminated. Thirty minutes later, Christal Schermeister of Florida went out on doryline. After the first hour, contestants started to be eliminated more quickly. Grace Remmer went out on melocoton, then Chetan Reddy and Syamantak Payra on kaburi and cipollino, respectively. Shivashankar went out tied for fifth after misspelling Zenaida. The tie for fifth place was decided by Vismaya Kharkar missing paryphodrome and the last girl, Amber Born, went out in fourth after misspelling hallali. Only Sriram Hathwar, Pranav Sivakumar, and Arvind Mahankali remained- all of them being 13-year-old boys.

=== Winner and runner-up ===
The judges switched to the "final 25" word list when Hathwar, Sivakumar, and Mahankali were the only spellers remaining. If the three contestants had survived the list, they would share the championship. Sivakumar correctly spelled avellaneous; Hathwar missed his word, ptyalagogue, finishing third (but became co-winner the next year). Mahankali was up next, and spelled crapaud correctly. Sivakumar followed by spelling haupia correctly, then Mahankali spelled kaumographer. Sivakumar was given cyanophycean. After asking some questions he misspelled the word as "cyanophycein". To win, Mahankali needed to spell two words correctly. The first was tokonoma, which he spelled correctly. The final word was knaidel, a German-derived Yiddish word for a small dumpling made using matzo meal and other ingredients. Mahankali had twice gone out in third place on German words during previous Scripps editions, but did not fail this time.

By finishing first, Mahankali won $30,000 in cash, a $2,500 U.S. savings bond, other small prizes, and a trophy. Upon the win, he declared "The German curse has turned into a German blessing." When asked what he would do next, Mahankali said "I will spend the summer studying physics." He admires Albert Einstein and hopes to become a physicist.

Mahankali was the sixth consecutive Indian-American to win the competition and the eleventh Indian-American champion in the last fifteen competitions. He was the first boy to win since 2008, and the first winner from the New York City area since 1997. After his win, Marya Hannun writing for Foreign Policy asked "Just what accounts for this astounding success [of Indian-Americans]?" She examined a number of contributing factors – India's emphasis on rote memorization in education, a tendency of immigrants to concentrate on one endeavor, and the Bee being viewed as an outlet for assimilation. Additionally, she writes, quoting Slate, "Indian-Americans 'have their own minor-league spelling bee circuit' – the North South Foundation".

Following the Spelling Bee, there was some disagreement on whether knaidel was the correct spelling of the word. Other suggested "correct" spellings included kneydl, knaydel, kneydel, knadel, and kneidel. Mahankali sampled knaidel for the first time at a New York deli after his win. On June 4, New York City mayor Michael Bloomberg honored Mahankali at City Hall.

== Word list championship round ==
- greffier
- psephologist
- pathognomonic
- odontoloxia
- minauderies
- Lethean
- singerie
- glossophagine
- tournedos
- panjandrum
- sciomancy
- lefse
- doryline
- Spenglerian
- myelogenous
- einkanter
- catachresis
- trichocercous
- envoûtement
- sansculottic
- lebensraum
- emmeleia
- transrhenane
- shillibeer
- aposematic
- ushabti
- galère
- auncel
- catawba
- temenos
- melocoton
- masoola
- cravenette
- misocainea
- mamaliga
- thonnier
- kaburi
- cipollino
- Abaddon
- semainier
- zenaida
- lansquenet
- thalweg
- chalumeau
- paryphodrome
- faconne
- hallali
- bidonville
- dehnstufe
- avellaneous
- ptyalagogue
- crapaud
- haupia
- kaumographer
- cyanophycean
- tokonoma
- knaidel
