= Bayside High School =

Bayside High School may refer to:

- Bayside High School (Virginia), a secondary school in Virginia Beach, Virginia, United States
- Bayside High School (Palm Bay, Florida), a secondary school in Palm Bay, Florida, United States
- Bayside High School (Queens), a secondary school in New York City, United States
- Bayside High School (Clearwater, Florida), a secondary school in Clearwater, Florida, United States
- Bayside Secondary School, a secondary school in Quinte West, Ontario, Canada
- Bayside High School (Pacific Palisades, California), the fictional setting for the American teen sitcom Saved by the Bell
- Bayside High School, a fictional San Francisco school featured on the American teen sitcom That's So Raven and its spin-off Raven's Home
