= Bayside, Queens =

Neighborhood in New York City

Bayside
- Neighborhood
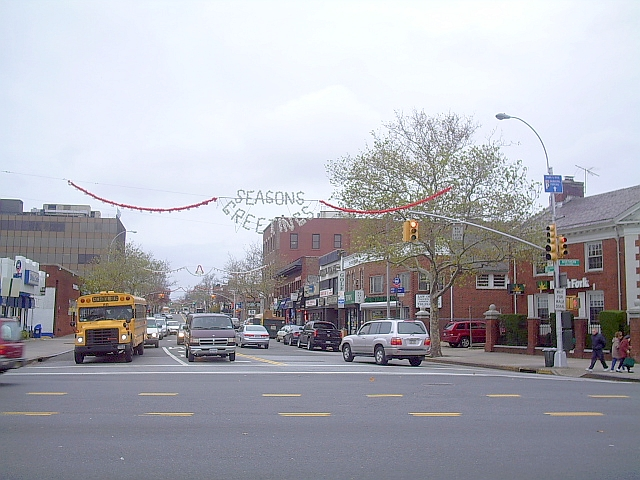
- Interactive map of Bayside
- Coordinates: 40.76°N 73.77°W
- Country: United States
- State: New York
- City: New York City
- County/Borough: Queens
- Community District: Queens 11
- Named for: Place name of the Native American Lenape

Population (2010 United States census)
  - Total: 43,808

Ethnicity
  - White: 46.9%
  - Asian: 37.3%
  - Hispanic: 11.6%
  - Black: 2.6%
  - Other/Multiracial: 1.6%

Economics
  - Median income: $95,114
- Time zone: UTC−5 (EST)
  - Summer (DST): UTC−4 (EDT)
- ZIP Codes: 11360, 11361, 11364
- Area codes: 718, 347, 929, and 917

Bayside is a neighborhood in the New York City borough of Queens. It is bounded by Whitestone to the northwest, the Long Island Sound and Little Neck Bay to the northeast, Douglaston to the east, and Fresh Meadows to the west. CNN Money ranked Bayside as one of the most expensive housing markets nationally when analyzing comparable detached homes. Despite its large housing stock of free-standing homes, it ranks high nationally in population density.

The first known written occurrence of the name Bayside was in a deed dated 1798, written as Bay Side. During the 19th century, Bayside was primarily farmland. Wealthy people from Manhattan visited it as a rural resort. During the 1920s and 1930s, there were several movie studios in Astoria, and many movie stars lived in Bayside, some in posh homes. After the end of World War II, residential development in Bayside increased dramatically, particularly because of its station on the Long Island Rail Road's Port Washington Branch, where a commuter could ride one train straight to Manhattan.

Bayside is in Queens Community District 11 and its ZIP Codes are 11360, 11361, and 11364. It is patrolled by the New York City Police Department's 111th Precinct. Politically, Bayside is represented by the New York City Council's 19th and 23rd Districts.

== History ==
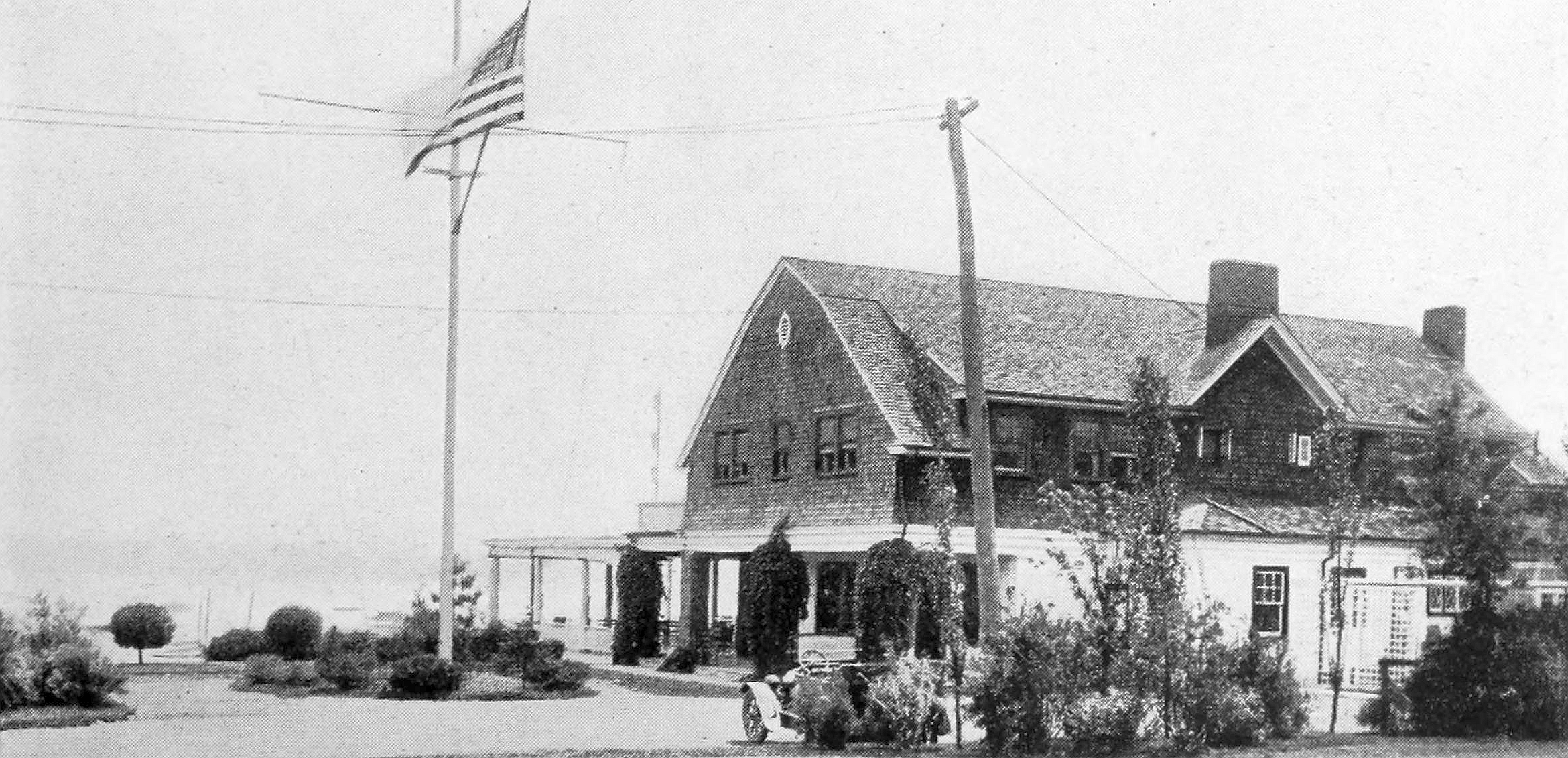
Bayside Yacht Club on Little Neck Bay, 1917

Bayside's history dates back to 2000 B.C. when the Matinecock Native American tribe first settled there. Around 1637, the Dutch West India Company encouraged Dutch farmers to settle on land grants in New Amsterdam, which was the name of New York then. William Lawrence, of England, built the first permanent building, a stone farmhouse, when he settled Bayside in 1644. Twenty years later, England took control of New Amsterdam, renamed it the Province of New York, and English people began settling the area. When Queens County was officially established in 1683, the Town of Flushing was one of the original five towns of Queens County, and today's Bayside was within the Town of Flushing. During the American Revolutionary War, whaleboatmen from Connecticut raided the Bayside–Little Neck area, and Town of Flushing was occupied by the British military.

The first known written occurrence of the name Bayside was in a deed dated 1798, written as Bay Side.

During the 19th century, Bayside was primarily farmland, where wealthy people from Manhattan would visit it as a rural resort. The Bayside House, owned by Joseph Crocheron, was well known for its clambakes. It burned down in 1906, but Crocheron's name lives on as the namesake of the 45-acre (18 ha) Crocheron Park.

Bayside was the site of a murder by Peter Hains, a prominent army officer, abetted by his brother, sea novelist Thornton Jenkins Hains, who gunned down prominent editor William Annis at his yacht club in 1908. The so-called "Regatta Murder" led to a widely publicized trial at the Flushing County Courthouse. Peter Hains was convicted of manslaughter and sentenced to eight years at Sing Sing. Thornton Hains was acquitted.

During the 1920s and 1930s, there were several movie studios in Astoria, and movie stars such as Rudolph Valentino, Gloria Swanson, Norma Talmadge, W.C. Fields, and Charlie Chaplin lived in Bayside, some in posh homes. Former heavyweight boxing champion James J. (Gentleman Jim) Corbett lived in Bayside from 1902 to 1933, on a street that is named after him. When rumors ran rampant through the acting community that Bayside would be the location of a new movie and production studio, many actors purchased homes in anticipation of an easy commute to the studio, but the rumored studio never materialized. When Hollywood emerged as the capital of the movie industry during the 1920s, many actors left Bayside to pursue careers in California.

After the end of World War II, residential development in Bayside increased dramatically, particularly because of its station on the Long Island Rail Road's Port Washington Branch, where a commuter could ride one train straight to Manhattan without transferring at Jamaica station.

Bayside remains one of the safest and wealthiest neighborhoods in Queens. But it has been the setting of several organized crime incidents. Michael Pappadio of Bayside managed the Lucchese crime family's interests in the Garment District of Manhattan, in secrecy from his wife. In 1989, upon falling out with his superiors, he was murdered at a bagel shop in South Ozone Park. His wife reported him missing, and three years later she learned about his death and his life in organized crime from the FBI. In April 2002, Gambino crime family associate Darren D'Amico was shot in the leg outside a restaurant in Bayside; his suspected shooter was Bonanno crime family associate Randolph Pizzolo.

== Location and boundaries ==
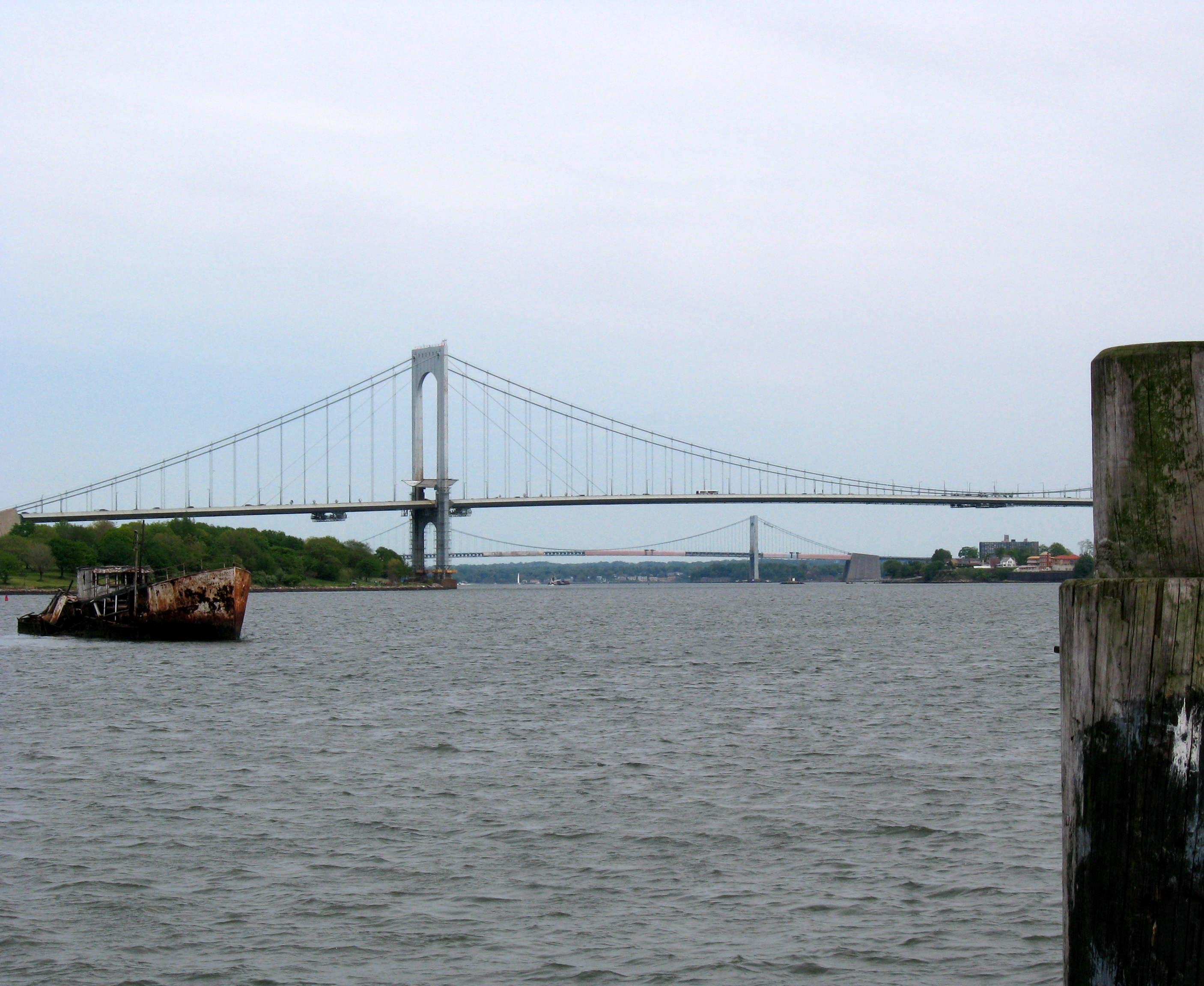
Bronx–Whitestone Bridge between the Bronx and Queens. The Throgs Neck Bridge, also between the Bronx and Queens, is visible in the background.

Bayside is bordered by the Long Island Sound to the north and the Little Neck Bay to the northeast. To the east is the Cross Island Parkway. To the west is Francis Lewis Boulevard and Auburndale, and to the northwest is Utopia Parkway. Bayside ends somewhere north of the Long Island Expressway, although Oakland Gardens and Hollis Hills are usually considered parts of Bayside.

=== Bayside Gables ===
Bayside Gables is a privately owned gated community near the Bay Terrace Shopping Center and the Little Neck Bay. Homes in this community sell for as much as $4 million.

=== Bayside Hills ===
Bayside Hills is a subdivision of Bayside's south side, bordered by 48th Avenue to the north, the Long Island Expressway to the south, 211th Street to the west, and Springfield Boulevard on the east. The homes in Bayside Hills, many built by Gross Morton, are generally more upscale and have higher property values.

Bayside Hills is known for its 33 street malls and accents, especially the gatehouse at Bell Boulevard and 48th Avenue, gateposts on 48th Avenue from 216th Street, and Bayside Hills Street Clock at 50th Avenue and 214th Street. The Victorian style street clock sits upon the Leo Green Clock Mall, dedicated to the local civic activist. Further east, Captain William C Dermody Triangle Park (48 Avenue and 216 Street) memorializes Dermody's abolitionism and service in the Civil War, leading him to be mortally wounded at the Battle of Spotsylvania Court House. Much of the public green space is maintained by the NYC Parks Department and the Bayside Hills Civic Association.

The zip code 11364 is shared with Oakland Gardens.

=== Bay Terrace ===
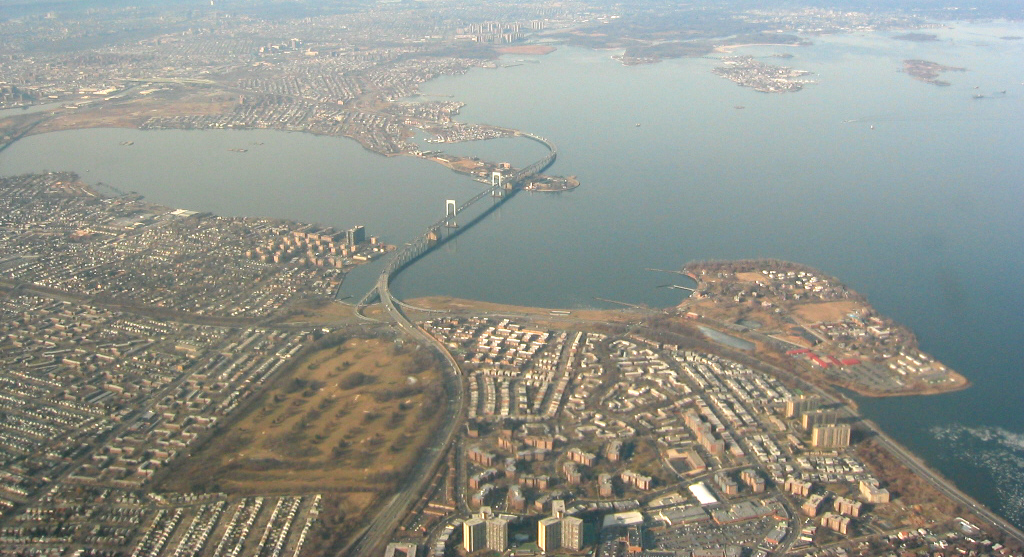
Aerial view of Bay Terrace, with the Throgs Neck Bridge crossing the East River to the Bronx in the north

Bay Terrace is an affluent neighborhood often considered part of the larger area of Bayside. The area encompasses gated cooperative/condominium developments such as the Bay Club and Baybridge Condominium. Other coop/condo developments include the Towers at Waters Edge, the Kennedy Street Quad, the Bayside Townhouse Condominiums, Bay Country Owners, and Bell Owners. The gated estate community of the "Bayside Gables" is also in the Bay Terrace neighborhood and is the site of some of the area's only single-family homes. Bay Terrace overlooks the East River and the approaches to the Throgs Neck Bridge from the Clearview Expressway and Cross Island Parkway. The neighborhood is bounded on the west by the Clearview Expressway, on the south by 26th Avenue and 28th Avenue, and to the east and north by the Little Neck Bay and Little Bay. The civic organization serving Bay Terrace is the Bay Terrace Community Alliance (BTCA). Bay Terrace has the ZIP Code 11360.

=== Oakland Gardens ===
Map of Oakland Gardens

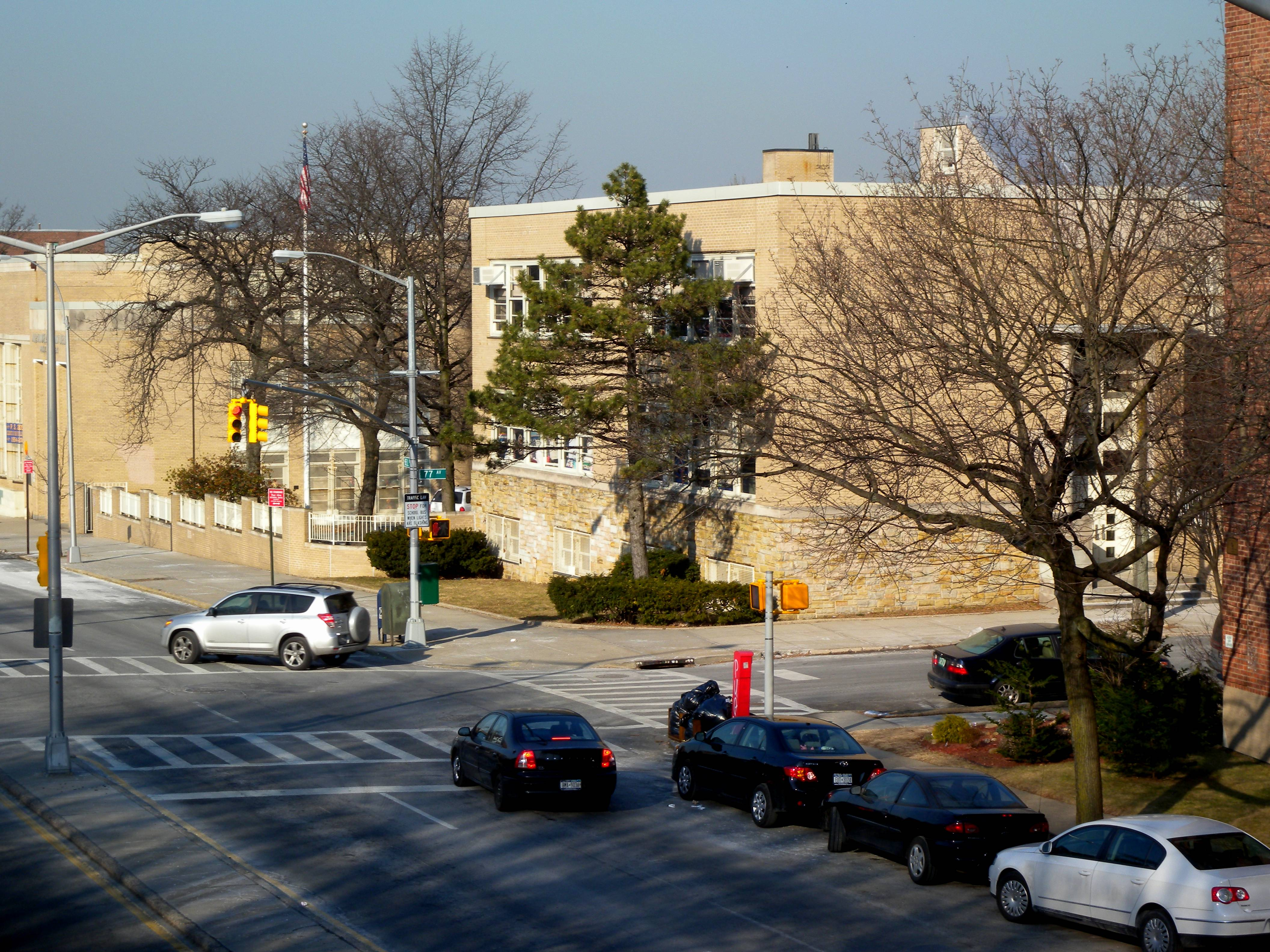
Bell Boulevard & 77th Avenue

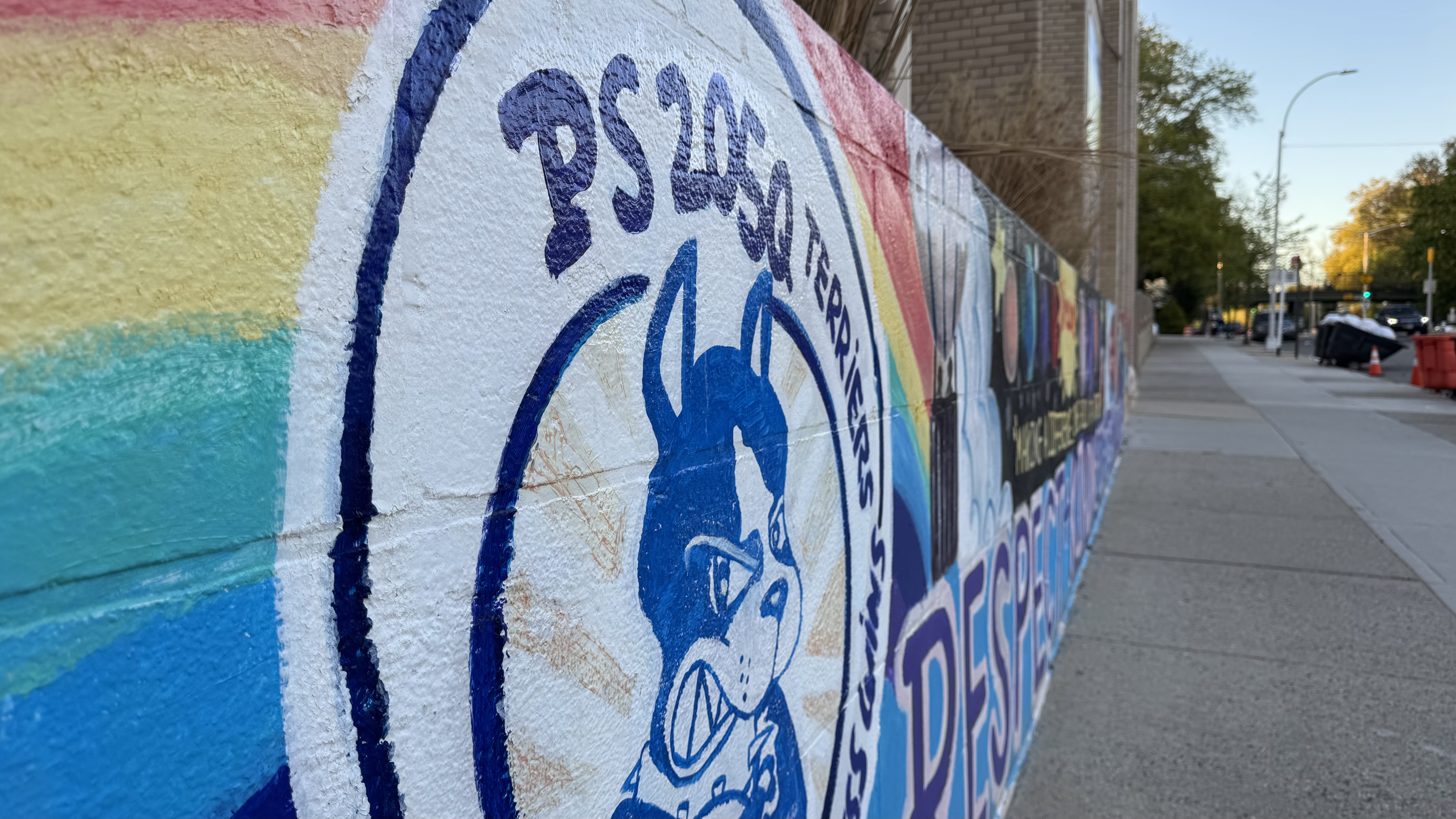
Mural on the side of P.S. 205 in Oakland Gardens

Oakland Gardens is an upper middle class neighborhood in southern Bayside, bounded to the north by the Long Island Expressway, to the east by Alley Pond Park, to the south by Union Turnpike, and to the west by Cunningham Park. Bayside proper is to the north, and Queens Village and Bellerose are to the south and southeast, respectively. Fredrick Newbold Lawrence built a mansion in the area in 1847 called The Oaks, and the neighborhood's name probably derives from that estate. Many people refer to Oakland Gardens as "southern Bayside". Its median income is $98,875 to $111,690 per year as of 2024–2025, according to recent estimates. This reflects an upper-middle-income community with earnings notably higher than the New York City median. The average household income is estimated closer to $120,769.

== Demographics ==
Local data from the Census Bureau's American Community Survey (based on samples from 2005 to 2009) shows that Bayside's demographics change significantly from area to area. For example, the pocket bordered by the Clearview Expressway to the west, Northern Boulevard to the north, Bell Boulevard to the east, and 48th Avenue to the south has a plurality (40%) of Asians, while 31% are Hispanic, 19% black and 13% white. Other areas are majority white, mostly of Italian, Greek, and Irish descent.

=== 2020 Census ===
As according to the 2020 census data, the Bayside neighborhood had about an equal amount of White and Asian residents with each of their population ranging from 10,000 to 19,999 residents. Black and Hispanic residents numbered fewer than 5,000.

=== 2010 Census ===
Based on data from the 2010 United States census, the population of Bayside-Bayside Hills was 43,808, a decrease of 563 (1.3%) from the 44,371 counted in 2000. Covering an area of 1,857.24 acres (751.60 ha), the neighborhood had a population density of 23.6 inhabitants per acre (15,100/sq mi; 5,800/km^{2}).

The racial makeup of the neighborhood was 46.9% (20,550) White, 2.6% (1,160) African American, 0.1% (24) Native American, 37.3% (16,324) Asian, 0.0% (7) Pacific Islander, 0.3% (112) from other races, and 1.3% (565) from two or more races. Hispanic or Latino of any race were 11.6% (5,066) of the population.

The entirety of Community Board 11, which comprises Bayside and Douglaston–Little Neck, had 119,628 inhabitants as of NYC Health's 2018 Community Health Profile, with an average life expectancy of 84.7 years. This is higher than the median life expectancy of 81.2 for all New York City neighborhoods. Most inhabitants are youth and middle-aged adults: 19% are between the ages of between 0–17, 26% between 25 and 44, and 31% between 45 and 64. The ratio of college-aged and elderly residents was lower, at 6% and 18% respectively.

As of 2017, the median household income in Community Board 11 was $70,155. In 2018, an estimated 14% of Bayside and Douglaston–Little Neck residents lived in poverty, compared to 19% in all of Queens and 20% in all of New York City. One in seventeen residents (6%) were unemployed, compared to 8% in Queens and 9% in New York City. Rent burden, or the percentage of residents who have difficulty paying their rent, is 49% in Bayside and Douglaston–Little Neck, lower than the boroughwide and citywide rates of 53% and 51% respectively. Based on this calculation, as of 2018, Bayside and Douglaston–Little Neck are considered to be high-income relative to the rest of the city and not gentrifying.

=== 2000 Census ===
As of the 2000 Census, White people made up 65.6% of Bayside's population. Italian Americans, Irish Americans, and Greek Americans were the largest ethnic groups representing 17.6, 12.4, and 7.3% of the population respectively. German Americans made up 6.7% of the population while Polish Americans were 3.5% of the populace. In addition, there is a large Asian American population as well. Around the mid-1990s, a significant number of Korean families began moving into the area. As of the 2000 Census, Asian Americans made up a significant 22.7% of the neighborhood's population, most of whom were Korean Americans, who made up 10.4% of the population and Chinese Americans, who made up 9.2% of the populace. There is a small African American community representing 4.5% of Bayside's population. American Indians made up a mere 0.2% of the neighborhood's population. Pacific Islander Americans were almost nonexistent in the neighborhood as there were only seven individuals of this ethnic group residing in Bayside at the 2000 Census. Multiracial individuals made up 3.2% of the population. Hispanics or Latinos made up 11.8% of Bayside's population with a small Puerto Rican population representing 2.6% of the neighborhood's population. In terms of nativity, 65.6% of the populace was native and 34.4% was foreign-born. In terms of language, 52.9% of the population aged 5 years and over spoke only the English language at home with the remaining 47.1% speaking a language other than English. Due to the large Hispanic community, 10.4% of Bayside's population spoke the Spanish language at home. Also, due to a large community of foreign-born European Americans, 15.2% speak an Indo-European language other than Spanish at home. And in part of the significant Asian American community, 20.7% of the population speak an Asian language at home. The northern part of Bayside, including Bay Terrace, has a large concentration of European Americans, particularly people of Italian heritage. The southern and eastern portions of Bayside have a more ethnically diverse population.

Bayside contains 11,439 housing units. The majority of Bayside's residents are part of family households representing 67.0% of all households with an average household size of 2.59. The median age of Bayside's residents is 38.3 years and 15.0% of residents are over 65 years of age. 83.8% of residents age 25 and over have at least graduated from high school, while 35.0% have a bachelor's degree or higher, making Bayside a more educated community than other American communities.

== Landmarks ==
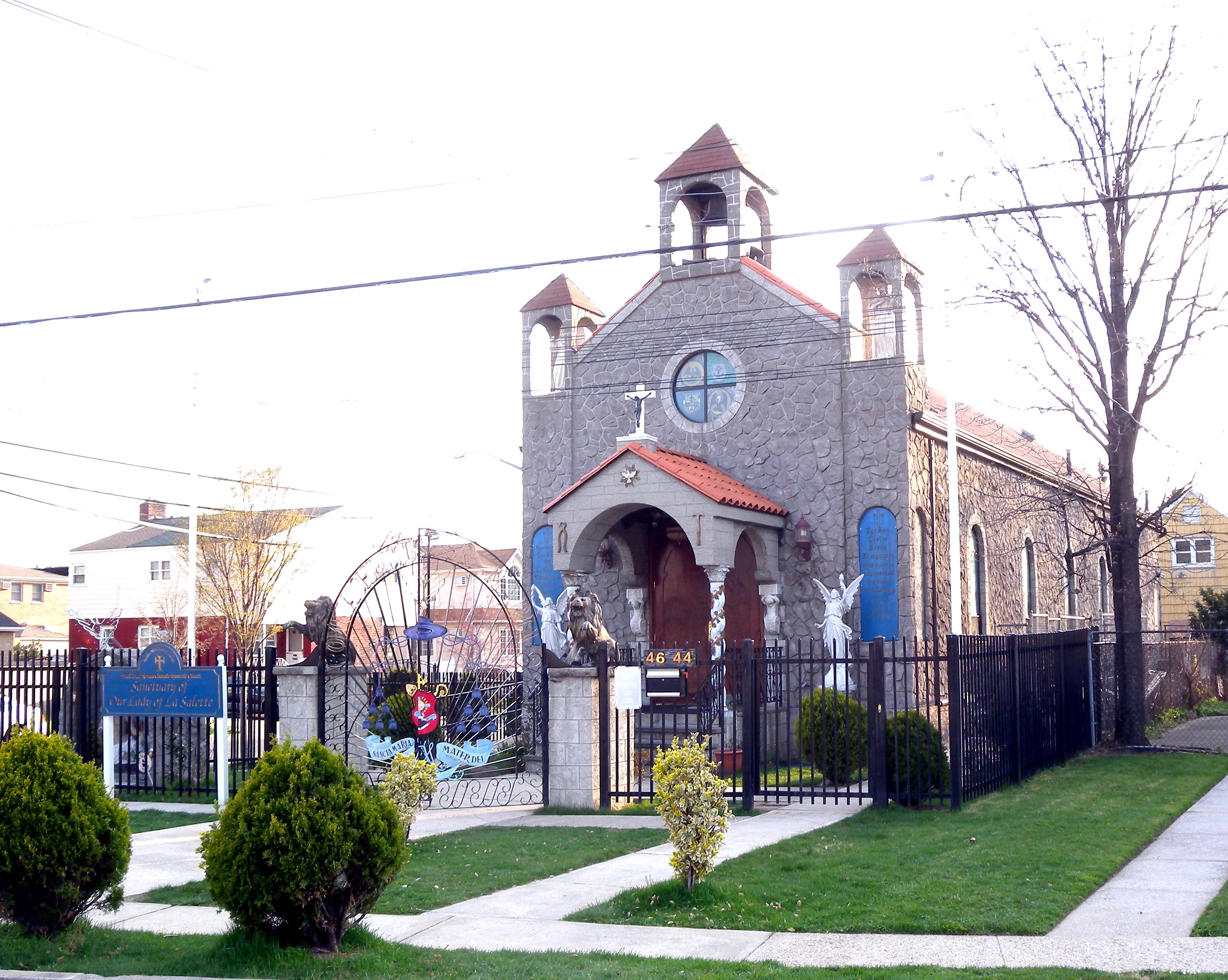
Shrine of Our Lady of La Salette

- Lawrence Cemetery – 216th Street & 42nd Avenue.
- Fort Totten, New York – A fort built during the Civil War to guard the north entrance to New York Harbor, along with Fort Schuyler in the Bronx, in 1862.
- Straiton-Storm Cigar Factory – Built c. 1872, the factory was the largest cigar manufacturer in America. The three-story wood-frame building was of the French Second Empire style. After a large warehouse fire in late 1976, the factory was refurbished to its original state.
- All Saints Episcopal Church – Built in 1892 as one of the first churches constructed in Bayside, the building contains examples of Louis Comfort Tiffany's work.
- Cornell-Appleton house at 214–33 33rd Road. Archibald Cornell's wife inherited the 100-acre (0.40 km^{2}) farm from her father more than 160 years ago. This twelve-room house is thought to be one of the oldest in Bayside. With past and continuing research, it has been traced back to 1852. In 1905, the house was sold to Edward Dale Appleton, of the Appleton Publishing Company. Mrs. Appleton and her sister were passengers aboard the RMS Titanic when it hit an iceberg and sank. Both women were rescued by the ship Carpathia. This is the second-oldest home in Queens.
- Corbett House, 221-04 Corbett Road, the home of world champion boxer "Gentleman Jim" Corbett from 1902 until his death in 1933, and of his widow Vera until her death in 1959.
- 38–39 214th Place, home of Charles Johnson Post (1873–1956), a government official, artist, and political cartoonist whose posthumously published The Little War of Private Post (1960) is one of the classic accounts of the Spanish–American War of 1898.
- 35–25 223rd Street, home of actor W.C. Fields.
- "Authors House", an attached two-family house with the double addresses of 46–02 215th Street and 214–30 46th Avenue, which has been the home of more authors than any other building in Bayside.
- Gloria Swanson's home, 216-07 40th Avenue, was the home of the silent film actress.
- Rudolph Valentino's home, 201-10 Cross Island Parkway, was where Valentino, an Italian actor, sex symbol, and early pop icon, lived. It was also once home to Fiorello LaGuardia, the mayor of New York City from 1934 to 1945. In 1993, the building was converted into a two-floor restaurant/banquet hall named Cafe on the Green. The eatery shut down in January 2009 when the city Parks Department forced out the former operators amid reports of mob ties and sloppy finances. The site's new concessionaire, Friendship Restaurant Group, began a $4 million renovation project February 1, 2009. The new restaurant, Valentino's on the Green, opened on September 8, 2010.

== Police and crime ==
Bayside and Douglaston–Little Neck are patrolled by the 111th Precinct of the NYPD, at 45-06 215th Street. The 111th Precinct ranked 8th safest out of 69 patrol areas for per-capita crime in 2010. As of 2018, with a non-fatal assault rate of 8 per 100,000 people, Bayside and Douglaston–Little Neck's rate of violent crimes per capita is the lowest of any area in New York City. The incarceration rate of 110 per 100,000 people is lower than that of the city as a whole.

The 111th Precinct has a lower crime rate than in the 1990s, with crimes across all categories having decreased by 88.6% between 1990 and 2018. The precinct reported 0 murders, 7 rapes, 35 robberies, 74 felony assaults, 163 burglaries, 361 grand larcenies, and 37 grand larcenies auto in 2018.

== Fire safety ==
Bayside contains two New York City Fire Department (FDNY) fire stations. Engine Company 306 is at 40-18 214th Place, while Engine Co. 326/Ladder Co. 160/Battalion 53 is at 64-04 Springfield Boulevard.

The FDNY EMS Training Academy is in Bay Terrace at Fort Totten. The site also contains a museum of FDNY EMS history.

== Health ==
As of 2018, preterm births and births to teenage mothers are less common in Bayside and Douglaston–Little Neck than in other places citywide. In Bayside and Douglaston–Little Neck, there were 81 preterm births per 1,000 live births (compared to 87 per 1,000 citywide), and 1.9 births to teenage mothers per 1,000 live births (compared to 19.3 per 1,000 citywide). Bayside and Douglaston–Little Neck have a low population of residents who are uninsured. In 2018, this population of uninsured residents was estimated to be 5%, lower than the citywide rate of 12%, though this was based on a small sample size.

The concentration of fine particulate matter, the deadliest type of air pollutant, in Bayside and Douglaston–Little Neck is 0.0069 milligrams per cubic metre (6.9×10^{−9} oz/ft^{3}), less than the city average. Ten percent of Bayside and Douglaston–Little Neck residents are smokers, which is lower than the city average of 14%. In Bayside and Douglaston–Little Neck, 20% of residents are obese, 7% are diabetic, and 26% have high blood pressure. The citywide averages are 22%, 8%, and 23% respectively. In addition, 11% of children are obese, compared to the citywide average of 20%.

Ninety-four percent of residents eat some fruits and vegetables every day, which is more than the city's average of 87%. In 2018, 86% of residents described their health as "good", "very good", or "excellent", higher than the city's average of 78%. For every supermarket in Bayside and Douglaston–Little Neck, there are five bodegas.

The nearest major hospital is Long Island Jewish Medical Center in Glen Oaks.

== Post offices and ZIP Codes ==
Bayside is covered by multiple ZIP Codes. From north to south, they are 11360 north of 32nd Avenue; 11361 between 32nd and 48th Avenues; and 11364 between 48th Avenue and Union Turnpike. The United States Post Office operates four post offices nearby:

- Bay Terrace Station – 212-71 26th Avenue
- Bayside Station – 212-35 42nd Avenue
- Bayside Annex – 41-29 216th Street
- Oakland Gardens Station – 61-43 Springfield Boulevard

== Recreation ==
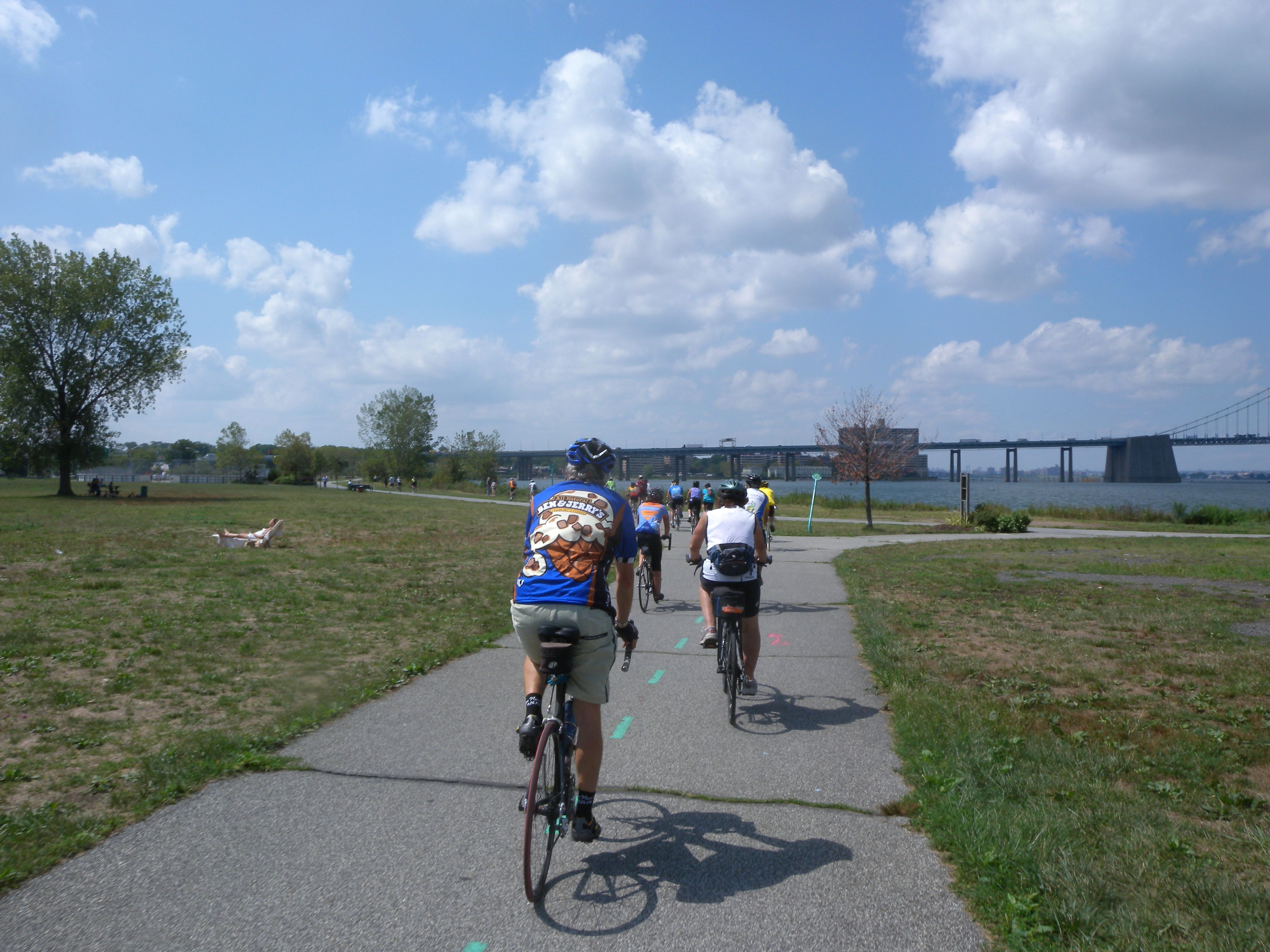
Little Bay Park

- Alley Pond Park
- Little Bay Park
- Crocheron Park
- Cunningham Park
- Throgs Neck Park
- John Golden Park
- Raymond O'Connor Field
- Marie Curie Park
- Fort Totten
- Bay Terrace Playground
- Oakland Lake

== Education ==
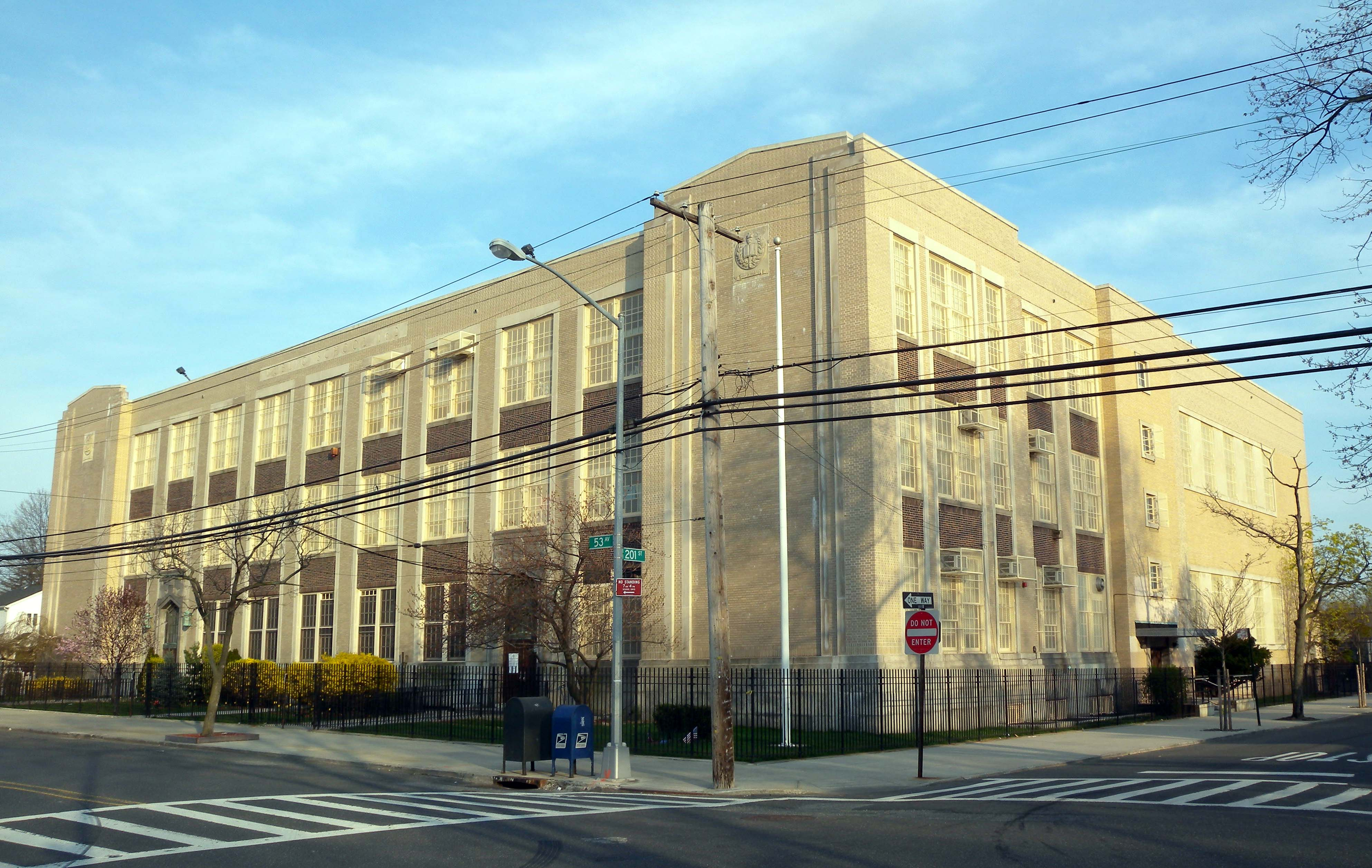
PS 162

Bayside and Douglaston–Little Neck generally have a higher rate of college-educated residents than the rest of the city as of 2018. The majority (52%) of residents age 25 and older have a college education or higher, while 11% have less than a high school education and 37% are high school graduates or have some college education. By contrast, 39% of Queens residents and 43% of city residents have a college education or higher. The percentage of Bayside and Douglaston–Little Neck students excelling in math rose from 70% in 2000 to 88% in 2011, though reading achievement stayed at around 73% during the same time period.

Bayside and Douglaston–Little Neck's rate of elementary school student absenteeism is less than the rest of New York City. In Bayside and Douglaston–Little Neck, 5% of elementary school students missed 20 or more days per school year, the lowest in the city and lower than the citywide average of 20%. Additionally, 95% of high school students in Bayside and Douglaston–Little Neck graduate on time, more than the citywide average of 75%.

=== Schools ===
Bayside is home to Queensborough Community College, a branch of the City University of New York (CUNY) system, established in 1959. The college is on a 37-acre (15 ha) site that was formerly the Oakland Golf Club.

Bayside is part of the New York City Department of Education's district 26, the highest-performing school district for grades K-9 in all of New York City. The district includes 20 elementary schools and 5 middle schools. District 25 also serves part of the neighborhood.

Bayside is home to a number of New York City Public Schools:

- Bayside High School
- Benjamin N. Cardozo High School
- PS 203 Oakland Gardens
- PS 213 Oakland Gardens
- PS 31 The Bayside School
- PS 41 The Crocheron School
- PS 46 The Alley Pond School
- PS 169
- PS 159
- PS 162 (New York) John Golden
- PS 205 Alexander Graham Bell Elementary School
- IS 25
- JHS 194
- MS 74 Nathaniel Hawthorne Middle School
- MS 158 Marie Curie Middle School
- MS 294 Bell Academy

Parochial schools include:

- Lutheran School of Flushing & Bayside (Lutheran school)
- St. Robert Bellarmine School (Catholic school)
- Our Lady of the Blessed Sacrament School (Catholic school)
- Sacred Heart Catholic Academy (Catholic school)

=== Libraries ===
The Queens Public Library operates three branches in Bayside:

- The Bay Terrace branch at 18-36 Bell Boulevard
- The Bayside branch at 214-20 Northern Boulevard
- The Windsor Park branch at 79-50 Bell Boulevard

== Transportation ==
Bayside's highways include the Clearview Expressway (I-295) and the Long Island Expressway (I-495), as well as the Cross Island Parkway. The north end of the Brooklyn–Queens Greenway is in Little Bay Park, under the Throgs Neck Bridge approaches, with a connection to the Utopia Parkway bicycle lane. It lies between Cross Island Parkway and Little Neck Bay, connecting Bayside to Douglaston and Alley Pond Park, and to central Queens and Coney Island. Francis Lewis Boulevard is a major street notorious for drag racing, which has resulted in several fatalities to drivers and pedestrians over the years.

Bayside is connected to New York Penn Station, Grand Central, northern Queens, and Long Island by the Bayside station, one of a few express stations on the Long Island Rail Road's Port Washington Branch. The New York City Subway's 7 and <7> trains serve nearby Flushing at the Flushing–Main Street station. New York City Bus's Q12, Q13, Q16, Q27, Q28, Q30, Q31, Q46, Q48, Q74, Q75, Q76 and Q88 local routes, and QM2, QM5, QM6, QM8, QM20, QM32, QM35 and QM36 express routes. The Nassau Inter-County Express's n20G, n20X routes also serve Bayside.

After the MTA began extending the 7 and <7> trains of the IRT Flushing Line westward into Manhattan in 2007, the 2012 fiscal year Community District Needs of Queens report suggested extending the line eastward from Flushing–Main Street to relieve congestion in Downtown Flushing. Early plans for the line were to have it end in Bayside at Bell Boulevard near Northern Boulevard.

== In popular culture ==
- The character George Costanza from the TV series Seinfeld mentions in the episode "The Strike" that his family lived in Bayside until they were driven out because of their belief in Festivus.
- The movie Sally of the Sawdust (1925) was filmed in Bayside.
- Bayside is featured in the 1997 NYPD Blue episode "Taillight's Last Gleaming". Two NYPD officers assigned to a Bayside precinct pull NYPD Lieutenant Arthur Fancy over while he is driving through Bayside with his wife, for reasons that appear racially motivated. Fancy then has the senior officer transferred out of his predominantly white precinct in Bayside to a predominantly black precinct in Brooklyn North as punishment.
- The movie Frequency is set in Bayside. Dennis Quaid's character brags that he is from "Bayside, born and raised!"
- The character Adrian Cronauer, played by Robin Williams in the movie Good Morning, Vietnam, is from Bayside. When asked "What are Queens?", Cronauer responds: "Tall thin men who like show tunes."
- The movie Pride and Glory shot several scenes in Bayside, including the family dinner set in Edward Norton's father's house.
- An episode of The White Shadow was in part filmed in Bayside. They used Bayside High School, the Bell Blvd. bridge over the Long Island Railroad and the front of De Rolf's Stationery Store for some dialogue scenes.
- The opening scene in the 1997 movie The Devil's Advocate was filmed at Pier 25A, a seafood restaurant in Bayside.
- In the 2007 film Before the Devil Knows You're Dead, the drive-by murder scene where Philip Seymour Hoffman and his brother rob their parents' jewelry store (Alicia's Jewelers in Bay Terrace) and accidentally kill them was filmed in Bay Terrace.
- The main residence of the characters of the 2025 TV sitcom Adults is located in Bayside.

== Notable people ==
- Rolf Armstrong (1889–1960), painter
- Adam Leitman Bailey (born 1970), real estate attorney
- John Barrymore (1882–1942), actor
- Jordan Belfort (born 1962), Wall Street stockbroker who was convicted on fraud charges and whose life story was featured in The Wolf of Wall Street
- Irving Berlin (1888–1989), composer and lyricist
- Patti Ann Browne (born 1965), anchor and reporter
- Maria Calegari (born 1957), ballet dancer
- Michael Chang (born 1972), tennis player
- Charlie Chaplin (1889–1977), actor
- Evan Conti (born 1993), American-Israeli basketball player in Israel for Hapoel Be'er Sheva B.C., and basketball coach
- Jim Corbett (1866–1933), boxer, lived here from 1902 until his death in 1933
- Joseph Cornell (1903–1972), artist
- Frank Costello (1891–1973), prominent gangster, known as the "prime minister of the underworld"
- Jon Daniels (born 1977), General Manager of the Texas Rangers
- Marie Dressler (1868–1934), Academy Award-winning actress who played Tugboat Annie
- Richard Dreyfuss (born 1947), actor
- Howard R. Driggs (1873–1963), historian of the Pony Express and the Oregon Trail
- W. C. Fields (1880–1946), comedian/actor
- John T. Flynn (1882–1964), author, journalist, and leader of the America First Committee
- Danny Frisella (1946–1977), former pitcher for the New York Mets who lived in Bayside while playing in 1971 and 1972
- Mark Gastineau (born 1956), defensive end who played for the New York Jets
- Estelle Getty (1923–2008), actress best known for her role on The Golden Girls
- Charles Ghigna (born 1946), poet and children's author known as "Father Goose", born in Bayside
- Jim Gilligan (born 1946), Lamar University baseball coach with over 1,230 career wins
- Alison Leslie Gold (born 1945), author of books about Anne Frank and the Holocaust
- John Golden (1874–1955), Broadway producer, playwright and lyricist
- Stephen Jay Gould (1941–2002), evolutionary biologist
- Edward Grazda (born 1947), photographer
- Clay M. Greene (1850–1933), playwright
- Joseph R. Grismer (1849–1922), actor
- George Grosz (1893–1959), German-American artist
- Mohammad Salman Hamdani (1977–2001), New York City Police Department cadet and EMT who died assisting victims of the September 11 attacks in New York
- Scott Ian (born 1963), musician, best known as the rhythm guitarist, backing and additional lead vocalist of Anthrax
- Judge Thomas Jones (1731–1792), colonial politician
- Mike Jorgensen (born 1948), New York Mets first baseman
- Stylianos Kalamaras, judoist and boxer
- Buster Keaton (1895–1966), comedian/actor
- Robert E. Kramek (1939–2016), U.S. Coast Guard Commandant
- Helmy Kresa (1904–1991), songwriter and the principal arranger and orchestrator for Irving Berlin
- Richard Larson (born 1943), operations researcher and educator, who has been a faculty member at the Massachusetts Institute of Technology
- Steve Lawrence (1935–2024) and Eydie Gorme (1928–2013), popular singers
- Dan Lilker (born 1964), musician
- Veronica Lueken (1923–1995), Marian visionary
- Bernie Madoff (1938–2021), financier who was the mastermind of the largest Ponzi scheme in history
- Arvind Mahankali (born 2000), 2013 Scripps National Spelling Bee champion
- Walter G. McGahan (1902–1981), lawyer and politician who served in the New York State Senate in the 1950s
- Richard Milner, historian of science and a singer who stars in the musical Charles Darwin: Live & in Concert.
- Paul Newman (1925–2008), actor
- David Nolan (born 1946), author and historian, 1963 graduate of Bayside High School
- Donald L. Pilling (1943–2008), former Vice Chief of Naval Operations
- Anthony Raneri (born 1982), vocalist and guitarist for the band Bayside, named after this neighborhood
- José Reyes (born 1983), former shortstop for the New York Mets
- Nolan Ryan (born 1947), pitcher, lived here while playing for the New York Mets
- Tom Seaver (1944–2020), pitcher best known for playing with the New York Mets, who was inducted into the Baseball Hall of Fame
- Butch Seewagen (born 1946), former professional tennis player
- Abe Simon (1913–1969), boxer and actor
- Fred Stone (1873–1959), actor
- Matt Striker (born 1974), WWE wrestler
- Ken Strong (1906–1979), New York Giants running back and kicker, member of Football Hall of Fame
- Gloria Swanson (1899–1983), actress
- Macrae Sykes (c. 1910–1996), former chairman of the American Stock Exchange
- Norma Talmadge (1894–1957), actress
- Clark Terry (1920–2015), Hall of Fame musician
- Neil Turbin (born 1963), thrash metal vocalist known for being the first full-time vocalist for the band Anthrax and current lead vocalist and songwriter of the heavy metal band DeathRiders
- Rudolph Valentino (1895–1926), actor
- Dave Valle (born 1960), MLB player for the Seattle Mariners, Boston Red Sox, Milwaukee Brewers and the Texas Rangers
- Reginald VelJohnson, (born 1952), actor
- Edward Villella (born 1936), ballet dancer
- Christopher Walken (born 1943), actor
- Pearl White (1889–1938), actress, star of The Perils of Pauline
- Robert Wilder (1901–1974), author of Flamingo Road and other books and screenplays
- Karen Yu (born 1992), professional wrestler, also known as "Karen Q" and "Wendy Choo".
