= Veronica Lueken =

American Marian visionary (1923–1995)

Veronica Lueken (July 12, 1923 – August 3, 1995) was a Roman Catholic housewife from Bayside, New York, who, between 1970 until her death in 1995, reported experiencing apparitions of the Virgin Mary, Jesus, and numerous Catholic saints.

She gave messages she claimed to have received from them at both the grounds of Saint Robert Bellarmine Catholic Church in Bayside, and at the exedra monument at the 1964 New York World's Fair Vatican Pavilion site in Flushing Meadows Park. Lueken and her husband Arthur W. Lueken, Sr. (died August 28, 2002) had five children. They met in Flushing Meadows Park skating rink on September 1, 1945 (Saturday, Labor Day weekend) and married the following November 1945.

Bishop Francis Mugavero, then Bishop of the Roman Catholic Diocese of Brooklyn, stated in 1986 that "a thorough investigation revealed that the alleged visions of Bayside completely lacked authenticity" and that "the messages and other related propaganda contain statements which, among other things, are contrary to the teachings of the Catholic Church".

== Marian apparitions ==
Lueken stated her first Marian vision happened in her home on April 7, 1970, when the Virgin Mary informed Lueken that: She would appear on the grounds of the old St. Robert Bellarmine Roman Catholic Church building in Bayside (in the spring of 1970, the new church opened about a block away), on June 18, 1970, and subsequently on the eve of great Catholic feast days. From that day, Lueken reported a series of Marian apparitions on the property of St. Robert Bellarmine in Bayside Hills.

According to her, on the date of her first vision, Lueken began to type up and circulate her messages against the Second Vatican Council, the revival of the permanent diaconate, the post-Vatican II Mass and the extraordinary ministers of Holy Communion. Many of her messages had apocalyptic content with prophecies not yet fulfilled.

== Health and death of Veronica Lueken ==
Lueken suffered from a variety of ailments, including: heart, kidney, bladder, spinal, arthritic problems, chronic fatigue, and tinnitus. From 1979 to 1982, she was hospitalized 13 times for extended stays. She died from congestive heart failure in the hospital on August 3, 1995, aged 72.

== Status of the apparitions ==
According to various Catholic sources, the Bayside visitations do not fulfill criteria that would qualify the alleged events as legitimate Marian apparitions and so are unrecognized. In addition to these concerns, the Diocesan Bishop of Brooklyn at the time of the alleged apparitions made the following declaration:

I, the undersigned Diocesan Bishop of Brooklyn, in my role as the legitimate shepherd of this particular Church, wish to confirm the constant position of the Diocese of Brooklyn that a thorough investigation revealed that the alleged "visions of Bayside" completely lacked authenticity.

[…]

Therefore, in consultation with the Congregation for the Doctrine of the Faith, I hereby declare that:

1. No credibility can be given to the so-called "apparitions" reported by Veronica Lueken and her followers.
2. The "messages" and other related propaganda contain statements which, among other things, are contrary to the teachings of the Catholic Church, undermine the legitimate authority of bishops and councils and instill doubts in the minds of the faithful, for example, by claiming that, for years, an "imposter (sic) Pope" governed the Catholic Church in place of Paul VI.

— Francis Mugavero, Declaration Concerning the "Bayside Movement" (1986-11-04)

According to St. Michael's World Apostolate, which continue to spread the messages, the Vatican's guidelines for judging apparitions were not followed by the Brooklyn Diocese, in their opinion.

== See also ==
- Malachi Martin
- Sedevacantism
