= Bayside station (LIRR) =

Long Island Rail Road station in Queens, New York

Bayside
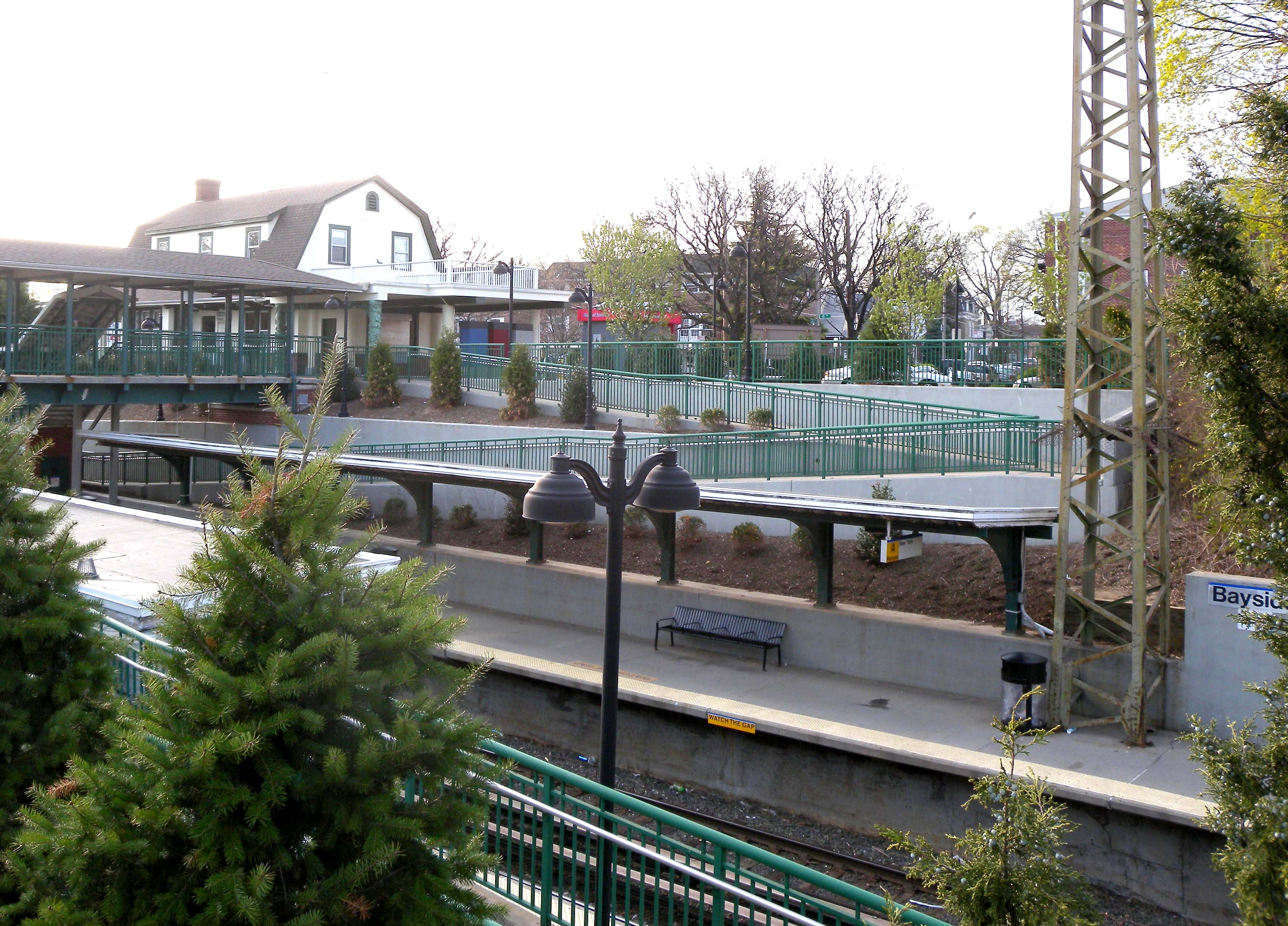
- View of Bayside station house and pedestrian bridge from above the eastbound ramp.

General information
- Location: 213th Street and 41st Avenue; Bayside, Queens, New York
- Coordinates: 40.763105°N 73.771804°W
- Owner: Long Island Rail Road
- Line: Port Washington Branch
- Distance: 10.8 mi (17.4 km) from Long Island City
- Platforms: 2 side platforms
- Tracks: 2
- Connections: NYCT Bus: Q12, Q13, Q31; Nassau Inter-County Express: n20G, n20X

Construction
- Parking: Yes (metered, NYC permit, & private)
- Cycle facilities: Yes
- Accessible: Yes

Other information
- Station code: BSD
- Fare zone: 3

History
- Opened: October 27, 1866 (NY&F)
- Rebuilt: 1923 (station house); 1928–1930 (grade elimination)
- Electrified: October 21, 1913; 750 V (DC) third rail
- Former names: Bay Side (1866–1872)

Passengers
- 2012—2014: 7,905
- Rank: 10 of 125

Services
| Preceding station | Long Island Rail Road | Following station |
|---|---|---|
| Auburndale toward Penn Station or Grand Central | Port Washington Branch | Douglaston toward Port Washington |
Location

Bayside (formerly Bay Side) is a station on the Long Island Rail Road's Port Washington Branch in the Bayside neighborhood of Queens, New York City. The station is located at 213th Street and 41st Avenue, off Bell Boulevard and just north of Northern Boulevard, and is 12.6 miles (20.3 km) from New York Penn Station. The station is part of CityTicket.

== History ==
Bayside station was originally built on October 27, 1866, by the North Shore Railroad of Long Island, a subsidiary of the New York and Flushing Railroad. The station, along with the rest of the line was acquired by the Flushing and North Side Rail Road in 1869. The F&NS was consolidated into the Flushing, North Shore and Central Railroad in 1874 through a merger with the Central Railroad of Long Island, only to be leased in 1876 by the LIRR. The current station building dates to October 11, 1923. The tracks were depressed beneath Bell Boulevard from 1928 through 1930. A railway express elevator building was then opened on the eastbound side until the Port Washington Branch stopped carrying freight. The 1928 express/baggage station remains today, being converted into a local community center. The wooden pedestrian bridge that carried commuters across the tracks to both platforms was replaced in 1998 by a decorative steel bridge.

The station, along with the Port Washington Branch in general, is heavily used. During the 2005 New York City transit strike, Bayside was one of the few stations that Port Washington trains stopped at, and lesser-used stations such as Auburndale and Murray Hill were bypassed.

== Station layout ==
The station has two slightly offset side platforms, each 10 cars long.

== Gallery ==
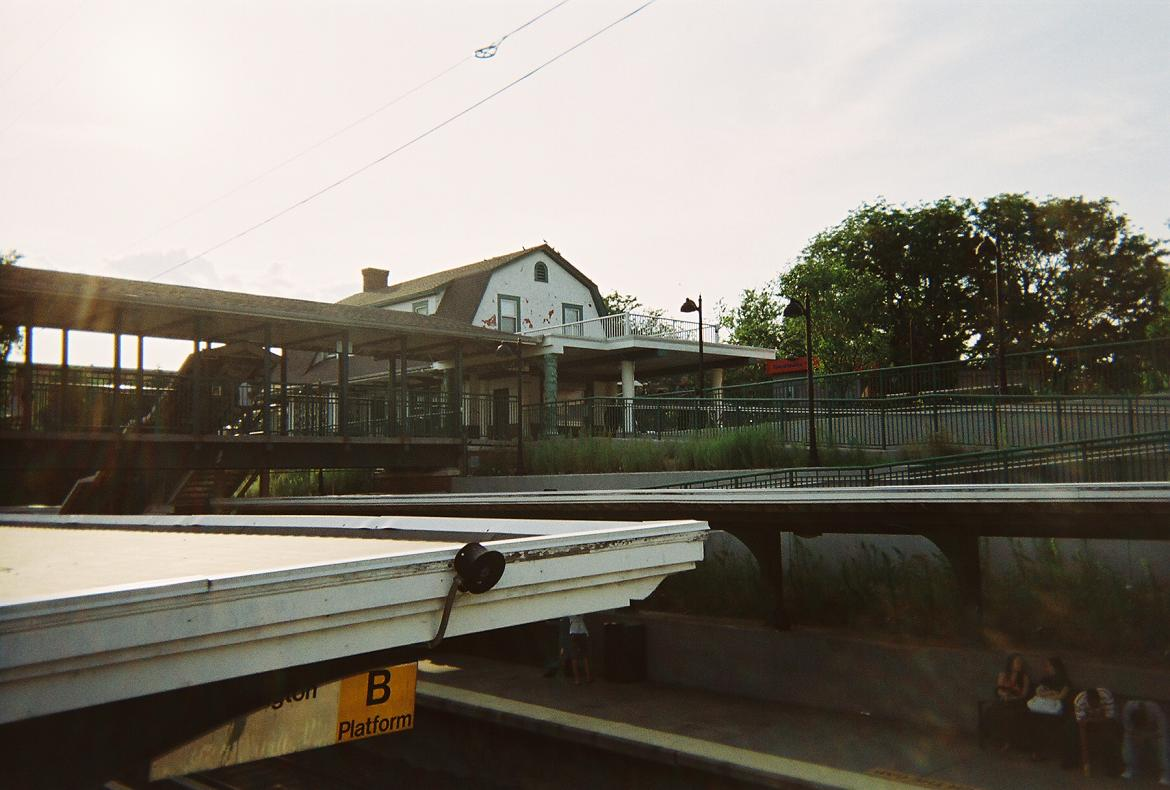
Station house on July 3, 2007

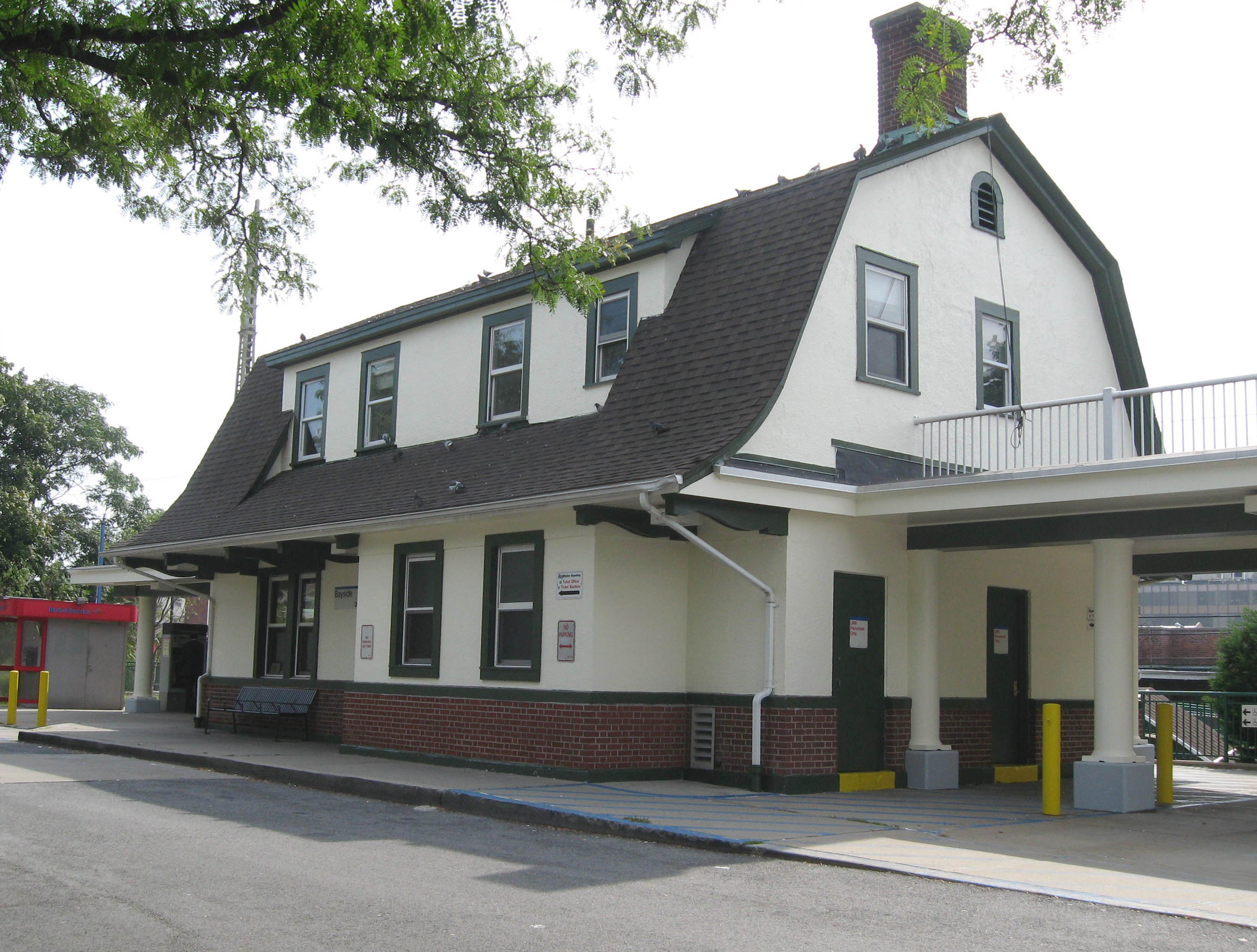
Station house from 41st Avenue

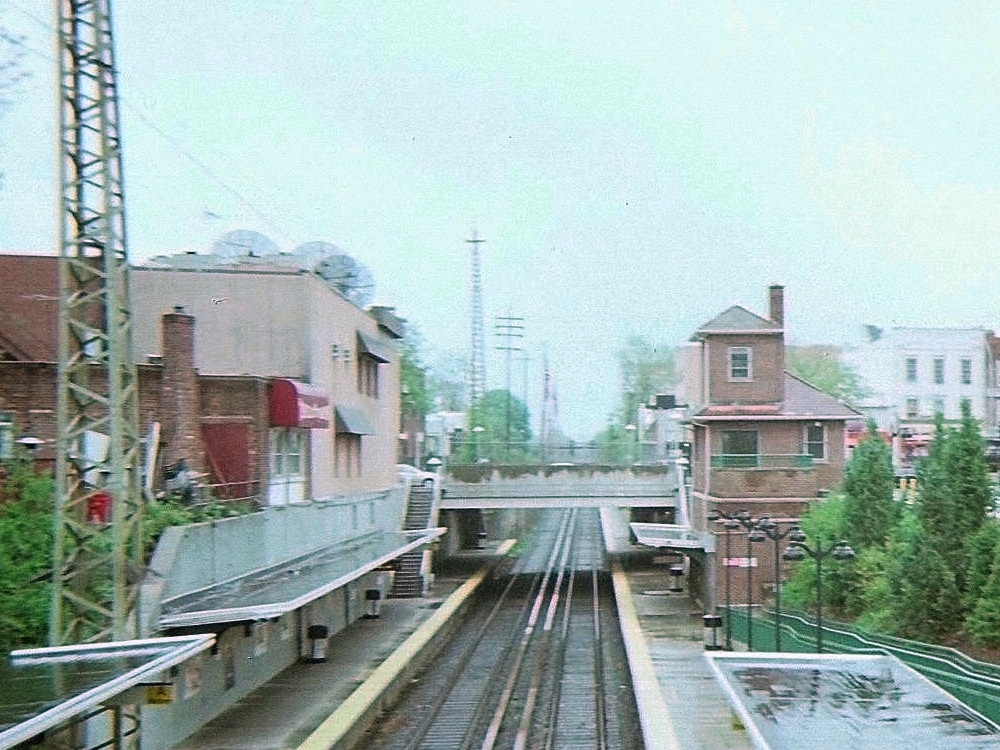
The former freight house, and Bell Boulevard Bridge.
