= Third rail (disambiguation) =

A third rail is an extra rail used for supplying electricity to trains.

Third rail may also refer to:

- Third rail (politics), a political metaphor
- Third Rail, a supporters' group for New York City Football Club

== Railroading ==
- The extra rail on a dual gauge railway
- Guard rail (rail transport), used to prevent a train from derailing.
- Third rail (model rail), in rail transport modelling, used for easier wiring
- The Third Rail (magazine), an online magazine about transportation

== Music and Entertainment ==
- Emergency Third Rail Power Trip, a 1983 album by Rain Parade
- The Third Rail (band), an American pop group
- The Third Rail (album), a 1996 album by Railroad Jerk
- "Third Rail" (song), a 1993 song by Squeeze
- Third Rail (TV series), a Singaporean TV drama series
- Third Rail Releasing, a film distribution banner of The Weinstein Company

== See also ==
- Three-cushion billiards, also called "three-rail"
