= Etihad Park =

Soccer stadium under construction in Queens

- The Valley of Ashes

- Rendering of Etihad Park from November 2024 showing its location within Willets Point.

- Location within New York City Location within New York Location within the United States
- Address: 126-87 Willets Point Boulevard
- Location: Willets Point, Queens, New York City, U.S.
- Coordinates: 40°45′29″N 73°50′36″W
- Owner: New York City FC
- Capacity: 25,000
- Type: Soccer-specific stadium
- Public transit: Long Island Rail Road (LIRR): Port Washington Branch at Mets–Willets Point; New York City Subway: trains at Mets–Willets Point; New York City Bus: Q19, Q66, Q90

Construction
- Groundbreaking: December 4, 2024
- Opened: July 2027 (planned)
- Cost: $780 million
- Architect: HOK
- General contractor: Turner Construction Company

Tenants
- New York City FC (MLS) (2027–future); Gotham FC (NWSL) (2028–future)

Website
- etihadpark.com

Attractions and geographical features of Flushing Meadows–Corona Park
Attractions and geographical features of Flushing Meadows–Corona Park:
1 Citi Field
2 Etihad Park (under construction)
3 Flushing Meadows Carousel and Queens Zoo
4 Flushing Meadows Corona Park Aquatics Center
5 Flushing River and Creek
6 Meadow Lake and Hong Kong Dragon Boat Festival
7 Metropolitan Park (planned) and Shea Stadium (demolished)
8 Mets–Willets Point subway station
9 Mets–Willets Point LIRR station
10 National Tennis Center and United States Pavilion (demolished)
11 New York Hall of Science
12 New York State Pavilion and Queens Theatre
13 Queens Botanical Garden
14 Queens Museum
15 Queens Night Market
16 Terrace on the Park
17 Unisphere
18 Willow Lake
19 World's Fair subway station (demolished)

Etihad Park is a soccer-specific stadium under construction in the Willets Point neighborhood of Queens, New York City. The stadium is the future home of New York City FC of Major League Soccer (MLS) and Gotham FC of the National Women's Soccer League (NWSL).

Etihad Park was designed by the architecture firm HOK. Construction started in December 2024, and is expected to be completed before the 2027–28 Major League Soccer season. New York City FC is shouldering a projected $780 million in building costs. The site land has been leased to the club rather than sold, waiving the City government's ability to collect a projected $516 million in property taxes over the 50-year term of the lease.

The naming rights are owned by Etihad Airways, the current jersey sponsors of New York City FC.

== Background ==
Prior to New York City FC being admitted into the league, Major League Soccer itself considered building a stadium in several locations around the city. These efforts continued until after the expansion, at which point NYCFC assumed responsibility for the stadium project.

One location, publicly considered by MLS in 2011, was the 14.5 acre Pier 40 at the west end of Houston Street adjacent to Hudson River Park in the borough of Manhattan. The plan was scrapped due to local opposition.

In 2012, MLS presented initial plans to build a soccer stadium in Flushing Meadows–Corona Park in the borough of Queens for a future team. The stadium was to be located on the site of the Pool of Industry/Fountain of the Planets from the 1964 New York World's Fair. The plan received opposition from community advocacy groups, for converting public park space for a private enterprise, and leasing 13 acres (5.3 ha) of public land for $1 a year for 35 years. City regulations require that any development that uses New York City public park land requires a land swap and the creation of replacement equivalent public park space.

Mayor Michael Bloomberg, who expressed support for the Flushing Meadows site, proposed converting the nearby site of the decommissioned Flushing Airport, but that plan too encountered criticism, as it would not have required the club to purchase any land, and would have replaced a park in a low-income neighborhood with one in a more affluent neighborhood and not accessible by public transit.

Once New York City FC was welcomed into the league, with the New York Yankees as a minority owner, their crosstown rivals the New York Mets also expressed their opposition to a new stadium at Flushing Meadows, as the proposed site was within sight of Citi Field, the Mets' home field. The Mets responded with an apparent demand for up to $40 million in compensation for the use of their parking facilities at soccer games, should that new stadium be built.

In face of that opposition, the league announced that the club would take over the search for a stadium location, "(continuing) to review other potential sites." Before bowing out of the process, MLS had considered a total of 24 sites around New York City. NYCFC announced plans to play at Yankee Stadium for three years during their search for a permanent home, making them the first MLS team to play league games in New York City. Plans for a Queens location were abandoned, and replaced with a proposal to build the stadium in the borough of the Bronx adjacent to Yankee Stadium.

On August 29, 2013, plans for a proposed nine-acre complex near Yankee Stadium, between the Major Deegan Expressway and East 153rd Street, were leaked. Randy Levine, the president of the Yankees, confirmed these reports, but stated that any plans were far from final. In December 2013, the team and Mayor Bloomberg's administration were close to an agreement over a $350 million stadium near Yankee Stadium. Mayor-elect Bill de Blasio, who replaced Bloomberg in January 2014, expressed opposition to the deal, as it involved tax breaks, public financing and a sale or lease of public land, potentially leaving the city responsible for its $240 million debt. In March 2015, New York property lawyer Martin Edelman, a member of Manchester City's board of directors, said that NYCFC had abandoned the Bronx plan and were looking at locations in Queens and Brooklyn to build a new stadium.

In April 2015, NYCFC was reported to be interested in building a new stadium in Columbia University's Baker Athletics Complex in the Inwood neighborhood of Manhattan. The 17,000 seat Robert K. Kraft Field at Lawrence A. Wien Stadium would be demolished and replaced with a $400 million 25,000-seat stadium to be used by NYCFC and the Columbia Lions. As of October 2016 the pursuit of the Baker Athletics Complex as a potential stadium site was abandoned.

In February 2017, it was reported that New York City FC had expressed interest in having its own soccer-specific stadium at a site within Belmont Park in Elmont, New York just outside the city limits in Nassau County. The club participated in site development talks in January 2017, though they did not enter active negotiations. On December 19, 2017, the site was selected as the new home for the New York Islanders' 18,000-seat arena, effectively ending the plans to build the stadium.

In April 2018, new plans for the Harlem River Yards development in the South Bronx were revealed, for the land north of the Willis Avenue Bridge; the area would be anchored by the new 26,000-seat stadium, which would be designed by Rafael Viñoly. On April 25, 2018, club president Jon Patricof said that the club was focusing on other sites more seriously than Harlem Yards.

In July 2018, New York City FC was once again linked to a development project that would put a stadium in the South Bronx at East 153 Street between Yankee Stadium and the Bronx Terminal Market. The 20-acre (8.1 ha) proposal also included a "park, hotel and conference center, affordable apartment units, office space, a school, and retail." On October 24, 2021, The City reported that stadium negotiations between the Yankees and the New York City Economic Development Corporation collapsed due to a dispute over 5,000 parking spaces in a city-owned garage, with community support waning as well. In November, club CEO Brad Sims stated the project had not progressed throughout the summer and the club was not actively pursuing the site; with all its focus now being shifted to a new possible location in Queens.

== History ==
=== Willets Point site ===
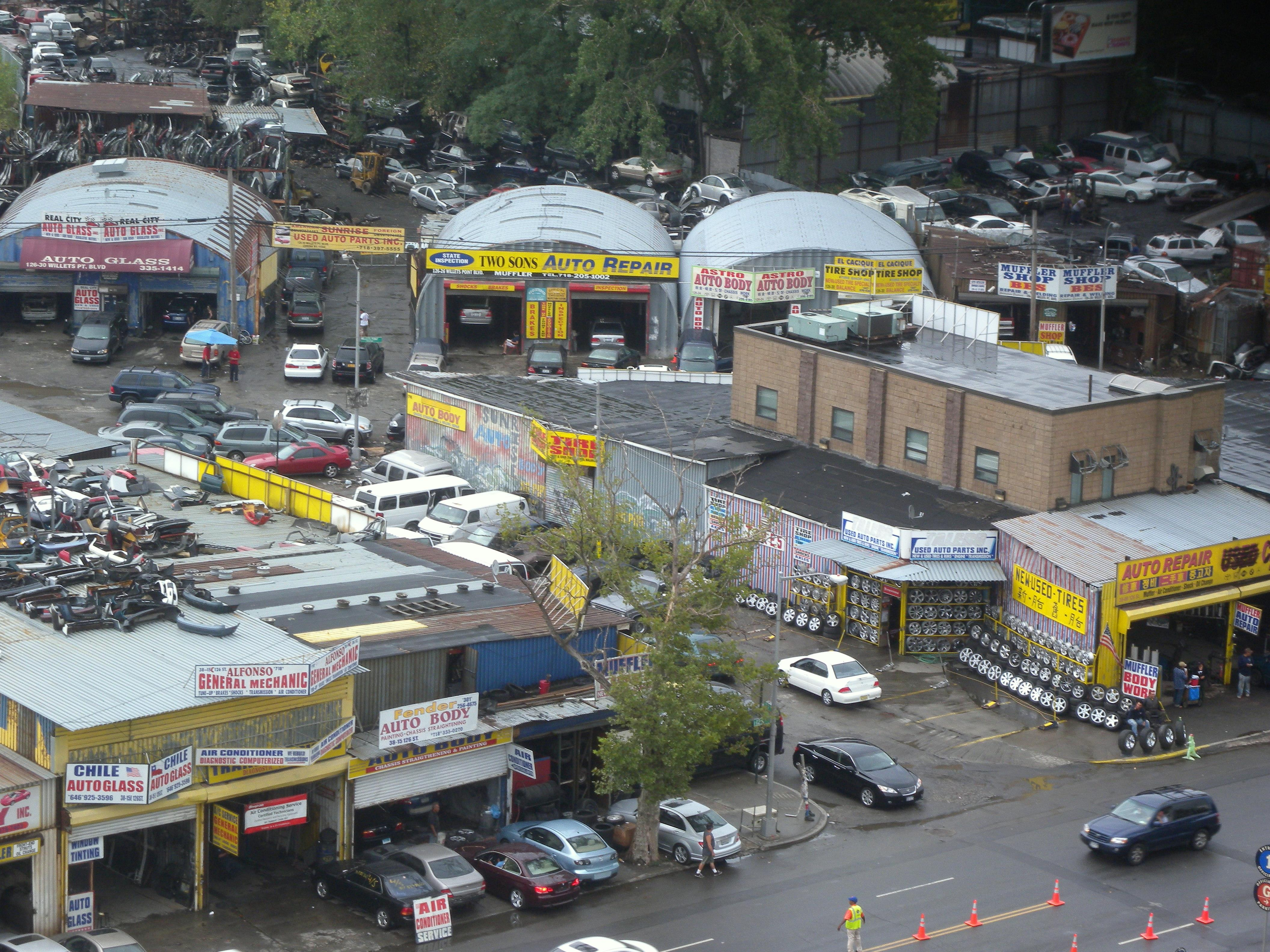
The location of the planned stadium as seen from Citi Field in August 2010, before the site was cleared

Willets Point, Queens, nicknamed the "Iron Triangle," was an industrial neighborhood best known for its collection of chop shops, auto-repair establishments, and junkyards which sat along deteriorated streets. The area—with no running water or sewage system, and only one permanent resident—was described by city planner Robert Moses as an "eyesore and a disgrace to the borough of Queens." A comprehensive redevelopment of the area had been "every mayor's ambition since the Fifties."

Mayor Bloomberg won approval for a $3 billion redevelopment of the area in 2012, but a lawsuit stalled the project, following the initial removal of a number of businesses. The redevelopment project was revived under the de Blasio administration, which created an advisory task force in 2018 that included then-Queens borough president Melinda Katz, and local City Council member Francisco Moya.

On January 17, 2019, the New York City Mayor's office released two development proposals for Willets Point. One of the proposals called for "a soccer stadium of up to 25,000 seats." Located across the street from Citi Field and north of Flushing Meadows-Corona Park, the soccer-specific venue would share parking with the existing baseball stadium. While the proposal never mentioned New York City FC by name, speculation linked the site and the club as The Related Companies, the developers behind the proposed Harlem River Yards plan, were also spearheading this development. Lower-division soccer club Queensboro FC had been linked to the site initially, before setting its sights on a new stadium at York College.

=== Planning ===
In July 2022, the New York Post reported that mayor Eric Adams would approve a plan to build a stadium in Willets Point to be completed in time for the 2026 FIFA World Cup, following the completion of the City's Uniform Land Use Review Procedure (ULURP). That November, the government of New York City and NYCFC came to an agreement to build a 25,000 seat stadium in Willets Point with a new targeted completion date of 2027, and the project was officially announced at a public event in the Queens Museum. The stadium would be part of a larger, three-phase mixed-use development known as the Willets Point Project.

The stadium will anchor the project, which will include 2,500 affordable housing units, a 650-seat school, a 250-room hotel, retail and commercial space, and 40,000 square feet of public open space on a 23-acre (9.3 ha) lot. Mayor Adams proclaimed this would be "the city's largest 100% affordable housing development in 40 years."

The Willets Point Project is a partnership between the New York City Economic Development Corporation (NYCEDC), the City of New York, New York City Football Club, and two developers, The Related Companies and Sterling Equities.

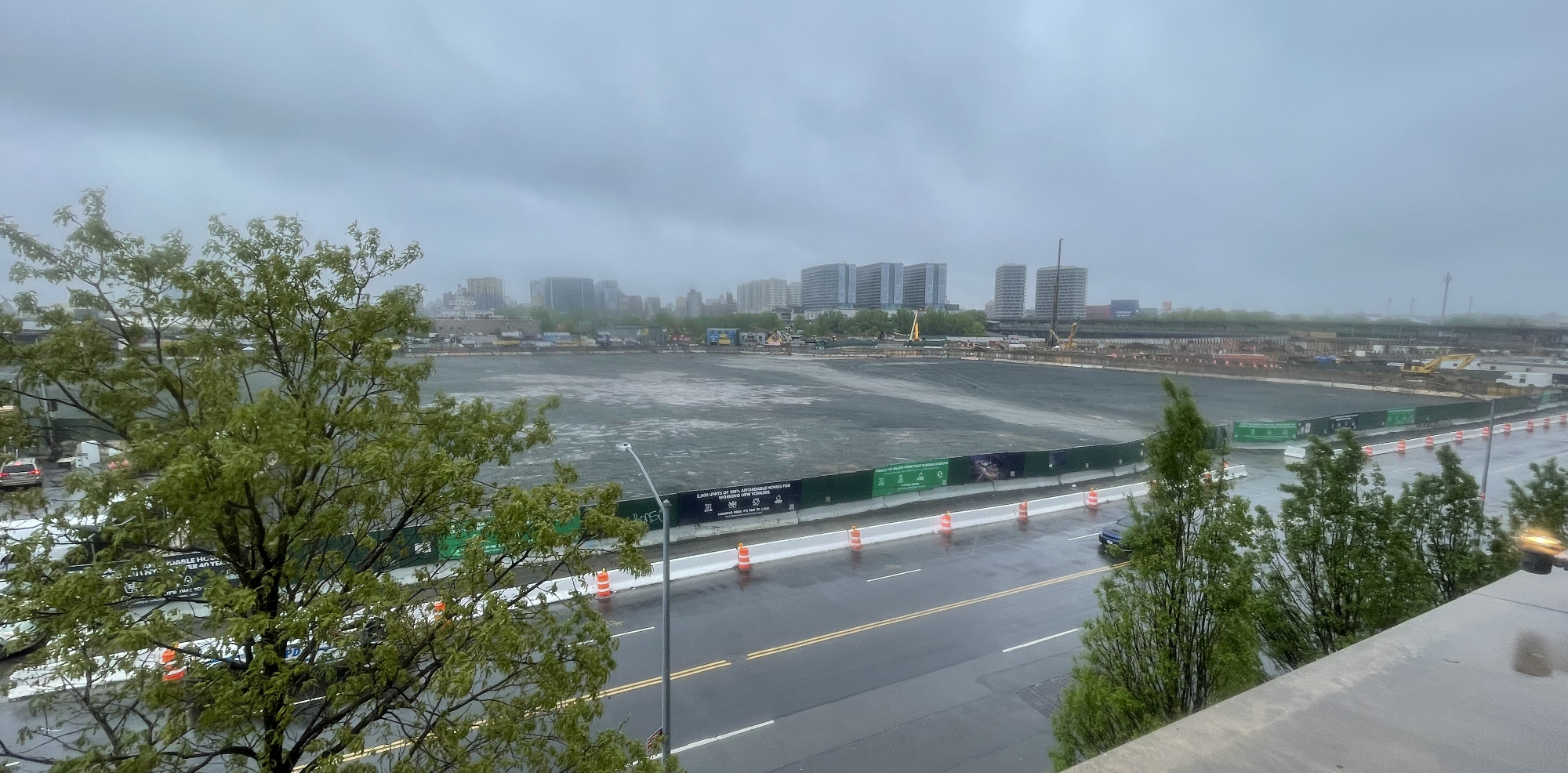
The cleared stadium construction site, as seen from Citi Field looking east; May 5, 2024

In December 2023, Queens Community Board 7 voted to advance the plan to build the Willets Point stadium. The project received the recommendation of Queens borough president Donovan Richards in January 2024, dependent upon the club's written commitment to hire local vendors and make improvements to nearby parks, among other pledges.

After passing through a City Planning Commission vote, the next phase of the ULURP process, with unanimous support, the club released new renders of the proposed stadium development. The project also received unanimous approval from the New York City Council's Zoning and Franchises Subcommittee and its Land Use Committee, before passing through the Council's main body by a 47–1 vote in April 2024. Mayor Adams attended a pre-game event before the club's April 20, 2024 match against D.C. United to celebrate the project's full approval with Councilmember Moya and other team officials.

=== Construction ===
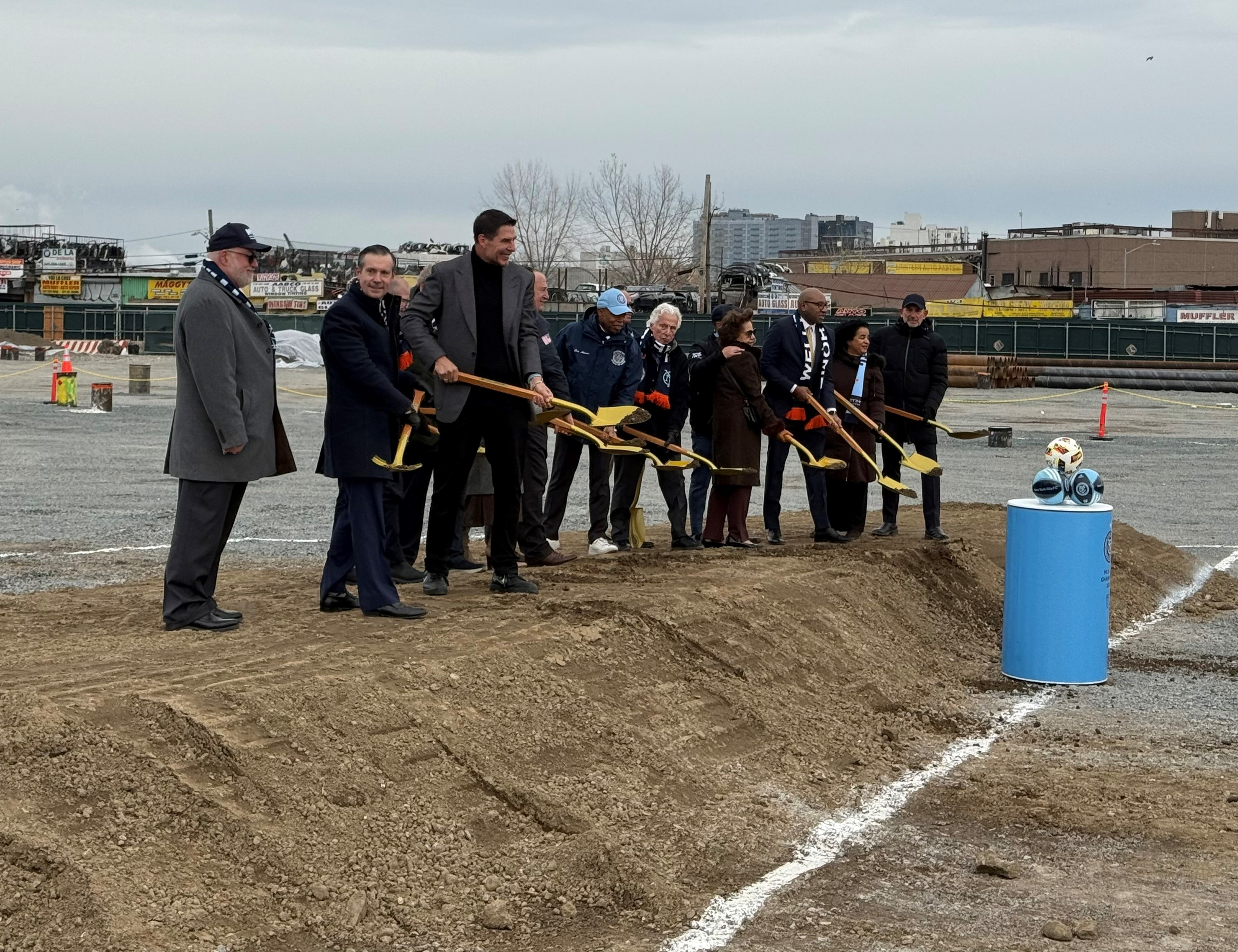
Etihad Park groundbreaking ceremony; December 4, 2024

Soil remediation to remove decades of pollution and contaminants from the site began in 2021 and was completed in May 2023.

A pre-construction public hearing with the New York City Public Design Commission was held on May 20, 2024, to finalize design elements of the stadium. The PDC conditionally approved HOK's design for Etihad Park, pending a heat island effect study, and clarifications or changes to the stadium's construction material choices, its public-access spaces, and art installations. Final approval was granted in September of the same year.

Construction began with a groundbreaking ceremony on December 4, 2024, attended by MLS commissioner Don Garber, along with key members of the club's front office and political figures including Mayor Adams, Borough President Richards, and Councilmember Moya. On June 16, 2025, the stadium's first structural beam was installed in the supporters' section, at a smaller ceremony attended by Moya and NYCFC staff.

In February 2026, NYCFC announced that the official opening of Etihad Park would be moved back to 2027 in the wake of MLS's decision to switch to a fall-to-spring schedule commonly used by international leagues, clarifying that the club would continue play at Yankee Stadium and Citi Field during the shortened transition season. The stadium was officially topped out on March 25, 2026, with a specially painted steel beam being installed on the grandstand roof, and the first seats were installed on August 21st of the same year.

Construction is expected to take 30 months, opening in July 2027 for the start of the 2027–28 MLS season. When complete, Etihad Park will be the first soccer-specific stadium in New York City history.

== Financing and ownership ==
New York City FC will pay the full $780 million construction cost of Etihad Park, while leasing the land it sits on from New York City. Public money contributions to the stadium will be limited to tax breaks and neighboring infrastructure improvements. However, the New York City Independent Budget Office has estimated that leasing the property rather than selling it will cost the City at least $516 million (adjusted to present value) in lost property tax revenue over the 49-year term of the lease.

The NYCEDC claims that the project itself will generate $6.1 billion in economic impact over the next 30 years, creating 1,550 permanent jobs and 14,200 construction jobs. Critics expressed skepticism of the purported economic impact, pointing to studies showing that stadium subsidies rarely generate net economic benefits, and questioned the need for any public money contributions when compared with the wealth of City Football Group and Yankee Global Enterprises, the co-owners of the club.

=== Ownership ===
Originally, Etihad Park was to be owned entirely by City Football Group, the majority owners of New York City FC. In September 2024 the New York Yankees, who formerly owned 20% of the club alone, decreased their overall share of the club to obtain a stake in a new holding company that encompasses the entirety of New York City FC. The new ownership structure leaves 80% of shares under City Football Group, as before, with the remaining 20% split evenly between Yankee Global Enterprises, and investor Marcelo Claure, who joined the ownership group in September 2024.

=== Tenancy ===
In July 2026, Gotham FC of the National Women's Soccer League announced that it would become a tenant of Etihad Park beginning in the 2028 season. The club previously played its home matches at Sports Illustrated Stadium in Harrison, New Jersey, which it shared with the New York Red Bulls of MLS, and previously used Yurcak Field at Rutgers University. Gotham FC's agreement with Etihad Park includes dedicated facilities, including a team locker room and merchandise areas, with its initial lease reported to be five years and containing options that could extend the agreement to up to 15 years.

== Design ==
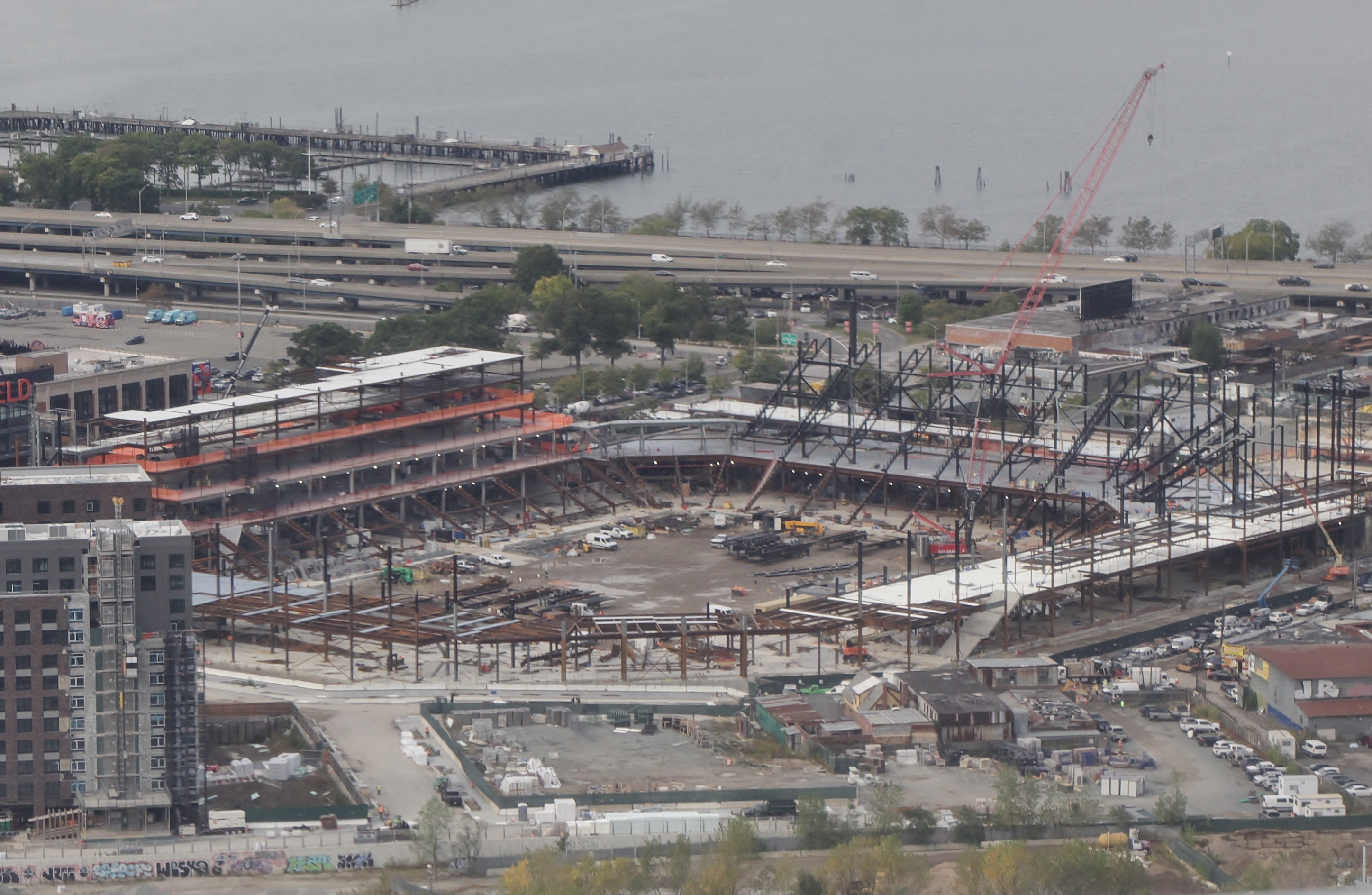
The construction site for Etihad Park in October 2025, showing the foundation and structural elements.

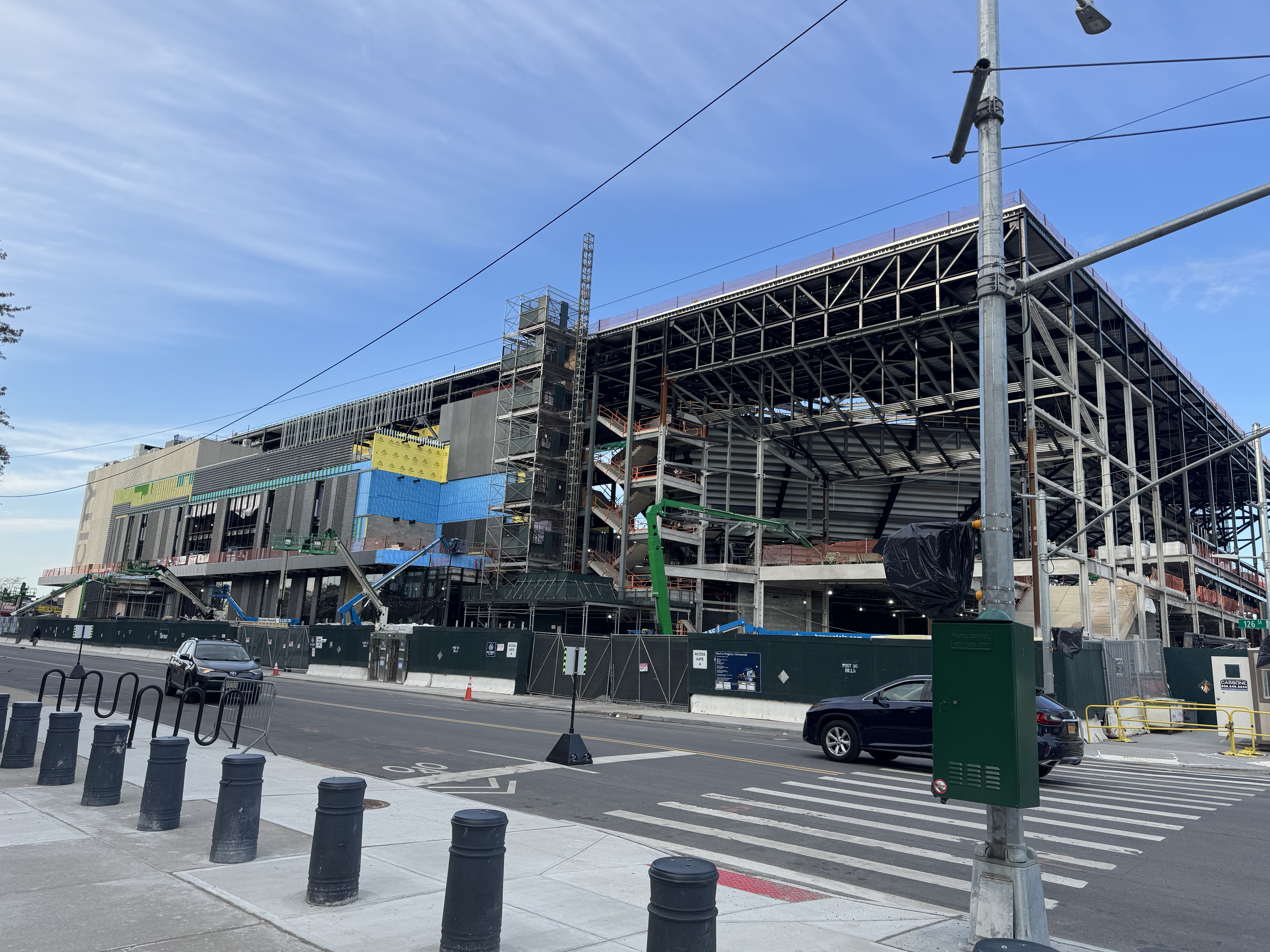
Etihad Park under construction in April 2026

Aerial view of Etihad Park and Citi Field, in September 2026

Designed by HOK, Etihad Park is made to fit in a narrow, jagged footprint within the larger Willets Point Project site. It features a rectangular-shaped structure, with the southeast corner cut off by the existing Willets Point Boulevard, and the northwest corner framed to match. The club has compared it to Fenway Park and Wrigley Field, baseball stadiums whose unique dimensions are created by the surrounding streets.

The main entrance, called 'The Cube,' will be a seven-story entryway bordered on top and both sides by three massive screens featuring more than 11,000 square feet of LED lights capable of displaying videos, photos, and moving graphics customized for match-day programming, as well as art displays and other year-round sights. It will be located on the southwest near the stadium's transit access points and parking lot.

Inside, the club plans to build a 40,000 square foot "Five Boroughs Food Hall" featuring a rotating group of local food vendors from each of New York City's boroughs.

For supporters, Etihad Park will offer a dedicated entrance, more than 3,400 safe standing positions, and the "Supporters' Porch" a 9,000 square foot rooftop bar area that can accommodate 1,200 fans before and after matches. There will also be a Tunnel Club which will be located near the player's dressing rooms and the media room for press conferences.

Etihad Park will be the first fully electric stadium in Major League Soccer and the first fully electric professional sports stadium in New York City. Sustainability efforts include an array of solar panels on the roof, locally sourced construction materials (thereby reducing transportation emissions), and a water harvesting system below the playing surface to capture rainwater for irrigation.

== Naming rights ==
In May 2023, reporting emerged that according to the term sheet for the Willets Point Phase 1B project, Etihad Airways had been "pre-approved as the primary Stadium naming rights partner." The Emirati airline based in Abu Dhabi already has a jersey sponsorship with the club going back to its founding, and has naming rights for the stadium of NYCFC's sister club Manchester City. However, on the initial renderings released by the club, the stadium featured the placeholder name "Naming Rights Sponsor Stadium" in bold letters on the roof and facade, leading some supporters to poke fun online that such name might be kept.

The club announced on November 21, 2024 that the new stadium will be known as "Etihad Park," after the airline secured naming rights to the stadium on a 20-year deal.

Anticipating the naming rights deal, supporters of the club began exploring possible nicknames they would use for the stadium, such as "The Valley of Ashes," a reference to the dumping ground from F. Scott Fitzgerald's 1925 novel The Great Gatsby.

== Events ==
=== 2028 Summer Olympics ===
On February 3, 2026, the organizing committee of the 2028 Summer Olympics announced that Etihad Park was selected as one of seven stadiums to host matches during the Olympic soccer tournaments. The stadium will host a total of nine matches, including a men's quarterfinal. During the course of the Olympic Games, the stadium will be temporarily renamed to "New York Stadium" in accordance with IOC's policy on corporate-sponsored names.

== Transit access ==
The majority of fans are expected to arrive at Etihad Park via public transit. The stadium will be served by the New York City Subway via the IRT Flushing Line (7 and <7> trains) from the Mets–Willets Point station, the Long Island Rail Road's Mets–Willets Point station on the Port Washington Branch, and the Q90 bus, much like Citi Field across the street. Additionally, the stadium is located in proximity to several major roads and highways, such as Roosevelt Avenue, Northern Boulevard, the Grand Central Parkway, the Long Island Expressway, and the Whitestone and Van Wyck Expressways.

Prior to the stadium's approval, Mets owner Steve Cohen threatened to withhold access to the Citi Field parking lots (which the Mets control) for New York City FC games, unless both the city and state approve his plan to build a casino on part of the parking lot. However, an agreement providing the club with 4,000 game-day parking spots in Citi Field lots was approved by the NYC Industrial Development Agency, a division of NYCEDC, in March 2024.

== See also ==
- Yankee Stadium, the current primary home of NYCFC and home of the New York Yankees, which opened in April 2009
- Citi Field, the current secondary home of NYCFC and the home of the New York Mets, which opened in April 2009
- Sports Illustrated Stadium, a soccer stadium in Harrison, New Jersey and current home of Gotham FC and the New York Red Bulls, which opened in March 2010

Events and tenants
Preceded by Yankee Stadium	Home of New York City FC; 2027 (planned)	Succeeded by none
Preceded by Sports Illustrated Stadium	Home of Gotham FC; 2028 (planned)	Succeeded by none
