= United States Pavilion =

Building in Queens, New York (1964–77)

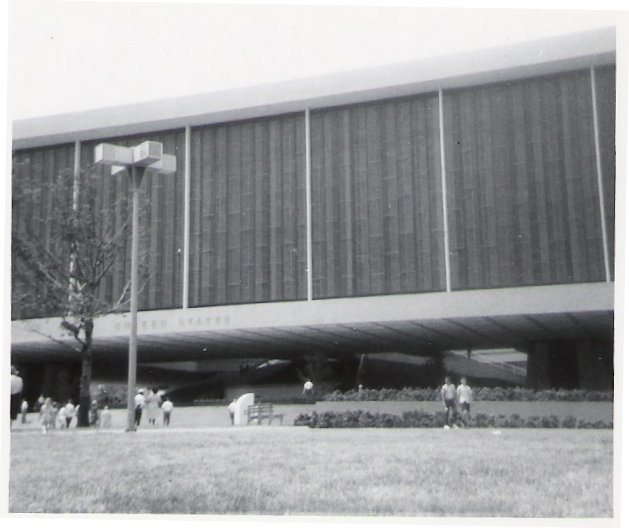
- Exterior of the United States Pavilion

- Location within New York City Location within New York Location within the United States
- Alternative names: U.S. Pavilion, Federal Pavilion

General information
- Location: Flushing Meadows–Corona Park, Queens, New York, United States
- Coordinates: 40°44′58″N 73°50′49″W
- Year built: 1962–1964
- Groundbreaking: December 14, 1962
- Topped-out: August 23, 1963
- Opened: April 23, 1964
- Closed: October 18, 1965
- Demolished: 1977
- Cost: US$10,500,000 (equivalent to $108,999,500 in 2025)

Height
- Height: 84 feet (26 m)

Technical details
- Floor count: 2

Design and construction
- Architect: Leon Deller
- Architecture firm: Charles Luckman Associates

The United States Pavilion (also known as the U.S. Pavilion and Federal Pavilion) was a pavilion at Flushing Meadows–Corona Park in Queens, New York City, New York, U.S. Themed to the "challenge to greatness", it was designed for the 1964 New York World's Fair by Leon Deller of the architectural firm Charles Luckman Associates. The building was a hollow square surrounding a garden court. Inside the building were two auditoriums, a dark ride–style attraction, several exhibit spaces, and a library. In addition, the pavilion had a hall of presidents during the 1965 season.

The United States Pavilion was first proposed in January 1960, but the United States Congress did not provide an appropriation for the project for two years. The U.S. government hired Luckman for the project in 1962, and U.S. President John F. Kennedy attended the building's groundbreaking ceremony on December 14, 1962. It opened on April 23, 1964, and operated for two seasons of six months each, attracting five million visitors during its first season alone. The structure became part of Flushing Meadows–Corona Park in 1967, but it remained abandoned for several years due to a lack of upkeep. The building was extensively vandalized, and numerous attempts to renovate and restore the pavilion proved unsuccessful. The United States Department of Commerce (DOC) proposed demolishing the building in 1974; following protracted disputes, it was ultimately razed in 1977. Arthur Ashe Stadium was built on the pavilion's site in 1996.

The structure was 84 feet (26 m) tall, standing upon four stilts, with a frontage of 330 feet (100 m) on each side. The structure had a translucent facade of multicolored plastic panels, and it was accessed by pyramidal staircases leading into the garden court. The exhibit spaces contained objects relating to American history and culture; they included the Challenge to Greatness, the Exhibit Hall of the Great Society, and two scientific-exhibit halls. The hall of presidents displayed artifacts from 13 U.S. presidents, while the library had study areas and numerous activities. The basement included a 600-seat theater that screened a short film, as well as a 200-seat multipurpose auditorium. Occupying the second floor was the American Journey ride, where visitors watched a short Cinerama film from slow-moving vehicles. Luckman's initial design for the pavilion was not well-received, but the final design and the exhibits themselves received positive reviews.

== Development ==
Flushing Meadows–Corona Park, a former ash dump in the New York City borough of Queens, was used for the 1939/1940 New York World's Fair. At the conclusion of the fair, it was used as a park. The Flushing Meadows site was selected in 1959 for the 1964 New York World's Fair. Gilmore David Clarke and Michael Rapuano, designers of the original World's Fair layout, were retained to tailor the original 1939 park layout for the new fair. New York City parks commissioner Robert Moses was president of the World's Fair Corporation, which leased the park from the city until 1967, after the fair's completion.

=== Early plans and funding ===
When the fair was announced, the New York state government had pledged not to request federal funds for the fair. As early as June 1960, United States Congress members from New York had proposed legislation to allow the U.S. government to host an exhibit at the fair. That December, Moses proposed constructing a science center at the fair, which would be maintained by the U.S. government and known as the Franklin National Center. This exhibit would have been located near the center of Flushing Meadow and would have cost $30,000,000 (equivalent to $326,490,000 in 2025). Wallace Harrison drew up plans for the structure, a hemispherical building with glass arcs and rectangular annexes around it. Another proposal, drawn up by the engineer Theodore J. Kauffeld based on a New Jersey teenager's idea, called for a 180-foot-diameter (55 m) sphere atop a series of piers. Had the Franklin National Center been built, it would have remained in the park as a permanent structure, but plans for the Franklin National Center were canceled in 1961. Even though the U.S. government had not committed to a pavilion, Moses wanted the federal government to construct a structure that "compel[s] the respect and even the admiration of mankind".

The United States House of Representatives passed a bill in mid-1961 to appropriate $300,000 for a U.S. government pavilion at the fair. Former U.S. president Dwight D. Eisenhower expressed support for the appropriation. The United States Senate would have to pass the bill; U.S. Senator Frank J. Lausche of Ohio opposed the appropriation because he did not want to use any federal money to finance the 1964 fair. J. William Fulbright, who chaired the Foreign Relations Committee, refused to consider the appropriation. As a result, the bill died in committee in September 1961. The Standard-Star criticized the "know-it-all way" of Fulbright's decision, and the New York Herald Tribune called Lausche's and Fulbright's behavior "petty". Likewise, Moses thought there would be "irreparable damage" to the fair's reputation if the U.S. had no exhibit at the fair. At the time, the United States' geopolitical rival, the Soviet Union, was planning to host an exhibit there. (Note: The Soviet exhibit was canceled before the fair opened.)

After the congressional appropriation failed, New York City Mayor Robert F. Wagner asked U.S. President John F. Kennedy to endorse the U.S. government's involvement in the fair. Moses also encouraged Kennedy to appoint a presidential committee to develop a U.S. pavilion. After Moses and Kennedy talked about the fair, Kennedy pledged support for U.S. involvement in the fair in October 1961 but did not explicitly approve funding for a pavilion. Kennedy also agreed to establish a committee to discuss the U.S. government's involvement with the fair. No progress occurred for several months, and, at a speech in March 1962, Moses expressed concerns about delays in the U.S. Pavilion's development. Following Moses's speech, Kennedy requested that Congress provide $25 million for the pavilion. This included $10.1 million for the pavilion itself, $13.7 million for the exhibits, and $1.2 million for the pavilion's programs.

The House of Representatives voted in late March 1962 to provide $17 million for the pavilion. The Senate was then asked to consider the appropriation. Fulbright and Lausche indicated that they would approve it only if the New York City government reimbursed the federal government after the fair. That April, the Senate approved $15 million at the recommendation of the Senate Appropriations Committee. Discussions about how to resolve the discrepancy were delayed due to disagreements over who should lead the discussions. U.S. Senator Jacob Javits introduced an amendment to a foreign-aid bill in June 1962, allowing the U.S. government to provide financial support to the fair. The next month, the House and Senate agreed on a $17 million appropriation, and they agreed to hire a commissioner to oversee the pavilion's development. The Senate also voted to approve the revised appropriation. Around $3 million from the appropriation was allocated to the interior design. The appropriation did not include funding for the Space Park (now part of the New York Hall of Science), which was also sponsored by the U.S. government.

=== Design ===
Kennedy appointed Norman K. Winston as the U.S. Pavilion's commissioner during the first week of August 1962, and Winston was sworn in to his position that week. The same month, Charles Luckman Associates was hired to design a 190,000-square-foot (18,000 m^{2}) pavilion for the fair, themed to the "challenge to greatness". U.S. Commerce Secretary Luther H. Hodges appointed an advisory committee to pick out the theme, which was inspired by a quote from congressional librarian Archibald MacLeish: "The American journey has not yet ended. America is never accomplished. America is always to build." The General Services Administration (GSA), United States Department of Commerce (DOC), and World's Fair Corporation (WFC) all had to review Luckman's design.

Luckman had already begun working on the plans before his firm was formally selected, and the U.S. government decided to use his designs due to time constraints. His initial plan, consisting of three spheres suspended from a central core, was criticized extensively. After the artist William Walton showed the designs to Kennedy, the president asked other architectural advisers to review Luckman's other proposals. Luckman drew up 28 alternate plans, which the U.S. government eventually whittled down to four finalist designs.

In October, the GSA hired Del E. Webb as the United States Pavilion's general contractor. The U.S. government decided not to select a contractor through competitive bidding because of the limited time available for construction. The original plans provided 20,000 square feet (1,900 m^{2}) for contemporary American art galleries run by the Committee of Artists' Societies, though the committee had requested twice that floor area. U.S. Representative Benjamin Rosenthal also proposed adding a hall of human relations in accordance with the pavilion's "challenge to greatness" theme. The U.S. government tentatively approved an alternate plan for the United States Pavilion in November 1962, which called for a hollow square on stilts. The New York Times said that the revised design resembled "a rectangle on a squat pyramid". The planned contemporary art galleries were canceled after the building was redesigned, as the new designs would have provided only 3,000 square feet (280 m^{2}) of art exhibition space, which the Committee of Artists' Societies felt was too small.

=== Construction ===
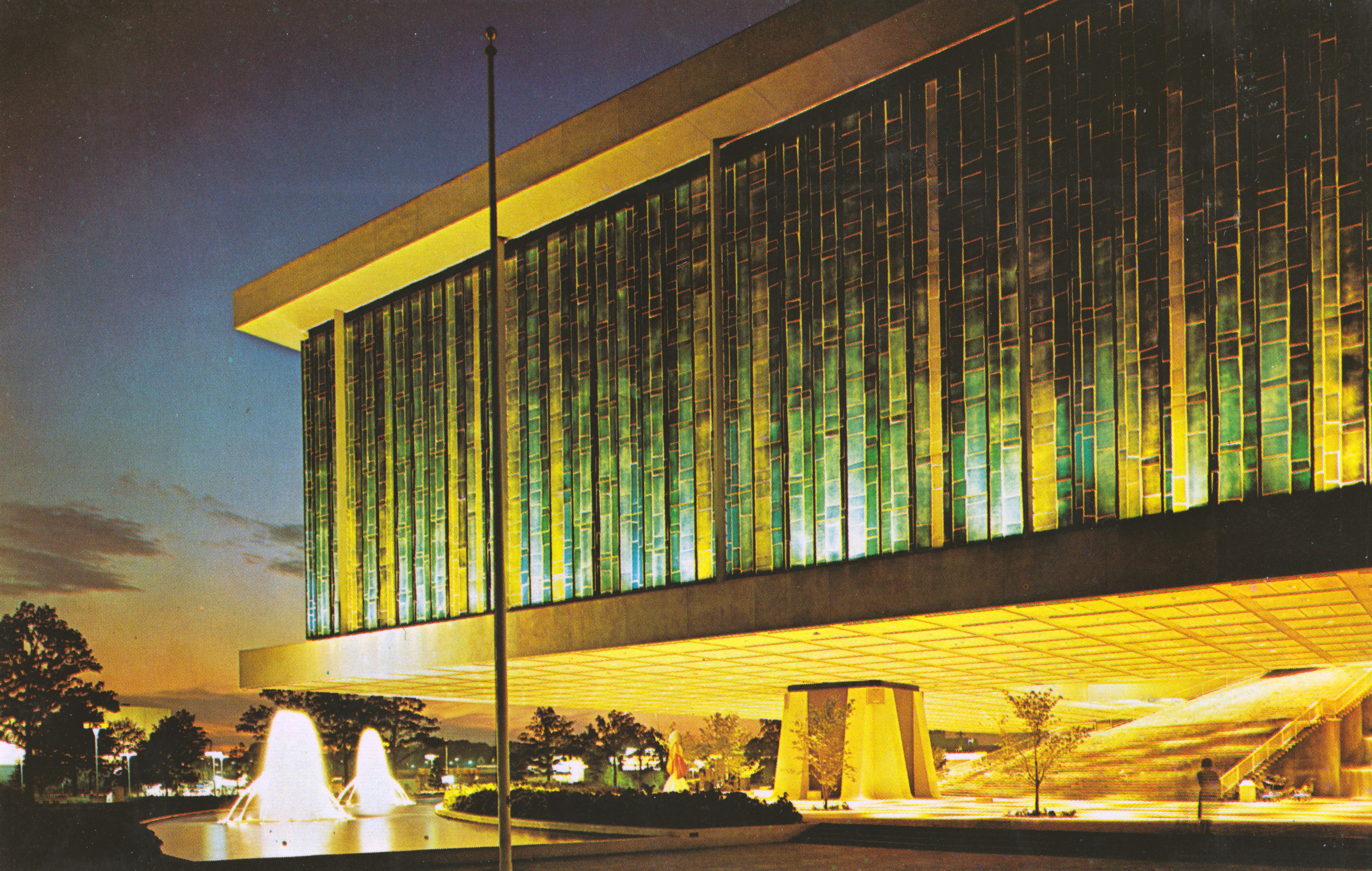
Color photo of the pavilion

Kennedy attended the building's groundbreaking ceremony on December 14, 1962. At the ceremony, Kennedy described the pavilion as presenting "a picture of democracy—its opportunities, its problems, its inspiration and its freedoms". A final model for the United States Pavilion was displayed the next month. Concurrently, the U.S. government began developing exhibits for the fair, in conjunction with 200 educators from across the nation. Workers were constructing the pavilion's foundations by April 1963, and the first steel pier for the pavilion, weighing 55 short tons (49 long tons; 50 t), was bolted into place that June. During the building's construction, civil rights groups claimed that the United States Pavilion was discriminating against African American construction workers, Federal authorities ultimately negotiated with the Union League of Greater New York to prevent the league from protesting outside the pavilion. In addition, one worker died during construction after falling off the second floor.

The pavilion's steel superstructure topped out on August 23, 1963. The Cinerama Camera Corporation received a $2.25 million contract that month to design a film for the pavilion. Work was slightly delayed that October due to a labor strike involving many of the pavilion's concrete workers. Following a discussion with U.S. Assistant Secretary of Commerce Herbert W. Klotz, Kennedy approved plans for a hall of presidents at the pavilion in November 1963, shortly before he was assassinated. The federal government hired George Nelson to design the hall of presidents, and a group of 75 historians created a list of 11 "great" and "near-great" presidents who should be featured in the hall. After Kennedy's death, his successor Lyndon B. Johnson added Kennedy to the hall of presidents. The U.S. government planned a 600-seat performing arts theater in the building, which was canceled in December 1963 because the congressional appropriation did not cover the theater's cost. Plans for a sculpture show at the pavilion, sponsored by the Museum of Modern Art, were also canceled.

The U.S. government unveiled a scale model of the pavilion in late 1963 and provided further details about the exhibits. By early 1964, the pavilion's estimated construction cost had increased to $10.5 million; this left only $4 million for exhibits and $2.5 million for operating costs. Accordingly, Klotz asked individuals and companies to donate money, artifacts, and decorations for the pavilion. The dramatist Jean Dalrymple was hired as the pavilion's performing-arts consultant. Two films were produced for the pavilion itself. As late as April 1964, the facade of the building was still surrounded by scaffolding, and workers were planting dogwood around the pavilion. To expedite the pavilion's construction, the federal government paid construction workers $100,000 in overtime.

== World's Fair use ==
1964 New York World's Fair grounds
Location of the United States Pavilion and selected other structures in the Federal and State Area during the 1964 World's Fair
1 United States Pavilion
2 New York City Pavilion
3 New York State Pavilion
4 Unisphere
5 Wisconsin Pavilion

=== 1964 season ===
The World's Fair formally opened on April 23, 1964, and President Johnson dedicated the United States Pavilion the same day. During the opening ceremony, hundreds of civil rights activists organized a sit-in at the pavilion and were arrested. When the fair opened, Moses indicated that the United States Pavilion might be preserved after the fair. The hall of presidents was not complete at the time, and the pavilion's operators had not even decided what to display in the hall of presidents. The American Journey attraction was also not ready for the fair's opening, and it was dedicated on May 5, 1964. Despite the pavilion's prominent location and large size, it was initially unpopular among guests. The building had relatively few exhibits on opening day, and the pavilion's design created a severe bottleneck. By July, it had become one of the fair's most popular pavilions.

A bust of John F. Kennedy was installed at the pavilion in July 1964, and Paul von Ringelheim's sculpture World Peace Screen was dedicated at the pavilion that month. Dalrymple hosted fashion shows at the pavilion during mid-1964, and librarians also told stories to children at the pavilion's library every day. The pavilion also hosted special events such as a party for its sponsors, a press conference by Johnson, and an Armenian Independence Day celebration. Toward the end of the 1964 season, a scale model of the John F. Kennedy Center for the Performing Arts in Washington, D.C., was displayed at the United States Pavilion. The pavilion closed for the season on October 18, 1964. During the season, the pavilion had received 5.5 million visitors, while the fair as a whole had had 33 million visitors. The WFC described the U.S. government as one of "four bellwethers" that it wished to attract for the fair's second season. (Note: The other three "bellwethers" were General Motors, the Soviet Union (which ultimately did not have a pavilion), and the Vatican.)

=== 1965 season ===
Between the 1964 and 1965 seasons, some of the pavilion's staff members remained at the building. As part of a renovation of several federal and state pavilions, a hall of presidents was to be added to the United States Pavilion. The U.S. government appointed a committee to curate the displays in the hall of presidents, and an exhibit about "the challenges and opportunities facing the American people" was also added. In addition, Winston selected 184 groups from across the U.S. and Canada to perform at the pavilion during 1965, and dancing and music programs were also presented. Moses wrote to the Mayor's Committee on the Future of Flushing Meadow in early 1965, asking them to retain two pavilions after the fair ended, but no decision on the United States Pavilion was made at that time. The building's preservation depended on whether the federal government was willing to pay for its upkeep. The trustees of the nearby New York Hall of Science wanted to convert the Ford Rotunda and United States Pavilion into additional space for the Hall of Science, which was being converted into a museum. The museum did not know how much the United States Pavilion's conversion would cost, and the plan was ultimately rejected.

The artifacts for the hall of presidents were transported from Washington, D.C., to New York City in April 1965 via armored trucks. The items were stored in a bank vault before being shown at the fair. The pavilion reopened at the beginning of the fair's second season on April 21, 1965. The hall of presidents was receiving its finishing touches at the time, and it opened a few days later. During the 1965 season, the hall of presidents attracted many visitors who came to see the historical documents and other artifacts there. Among the visitors was Eisenhower, as well as Vice President Hubert Humphrey and the daughters of presidents Eisenhower and Johnson. The building also hosted events like a chess tournament. In addition, as part of a five-month pilot program, two New York City Police Department officers used the pavilion's computers to retrieve information about vehicles that had been pulled over throughout the city; this information helped other officers arrest 165 people for various traffic violations. Further artifacts were added to the hall of presidents during August 1965.

In mid-1965, the mayor's committee recommended that the United States Pavilion be razed after the fair, citing the high cost of renovations. Winston supported its preservation, and by that August, several organizations had proposed preserving the building. The Queens Federation of Civic Council launched a fundraiser to preserve the structure. The New York Criminal and Civil Courts Bar Association proposed converting the building into a law school. Hofstra University and the Center for Applied Linguistics also made bids for the pavilion, and there were also proposals to give the structure to a city government agency. A month before the fair ended, there was still no decision on the building's future. The federal government was considering converting the building into a university library, linguistics library, job-training center, student exchange center, or training center for high school dropouts. Moses opposed the training center plan, seeking instead to demolish the building. The U.S. Department of Commerce estimated that demolition would cost $250,000, while Javits placed the demolition cost at $2 million. When the fair's second season ended on October 18, 1965, the pavilion was closed with a flag-lowering ceremony.

== After the fair ==
=== 1960s ===
==== Preservation agreement ====
When the fair ended, Moses was skeptical about the idea of preserving the building, since he wanted to redevelop the site immediately after the fair ended. The World's Fair Corporation mandated that most exhibition buildings in Flushing Meadows Park be demolished within 90 days of the fair's closure. If officials decided to demolish the U.S. Pavilion, it would have been allowed to remain until September 1966. The U.S. government had already spent the funds that had been allocated for the pavilion's demolition, and city officials were negotiating to preserve the New York State and U.S. pavilions. As such, the demolition contracts for the pavilions were postponed. If the United States Pavilion were to be retained, it would have to be upgraded to meet New York City building codes, and a heating system would have been needed. Mayor-elect John V. Lindsay supported the building's preservation, and the DOC also agreed to retain the building.

Wagner traveled to Washington, D.C., in November 1965 to discuss the building's preservation with federal officials. The following January, city and federal officials announced that the United States Pavilion would be preserved and would likely become an educational center. Moses, who had previously supported the building's demolition, was indifferent toward the new plans. Engineers had determined that the building's foundation was stable enough to accommodate a more permanent use. Discussions over the future use of the United States Pavilion continued for months after the World's Fair closed. The United States Pavilion was one of 18 structures that remained from the fair by mid-1966. An unidentified demolition contractor had offered to raze the building for $116,000; their bid was rejected.

Moses wanted the structure to become "a cultural feature" of Flushing Meadows Park. City officials proposed converting Flushing Meadows into a "sports park" in 1966 and converting the pavilion into a sports venue, but this never happened. There were other proposals for the pavilion in the decade afterward, none of which came to fruition. In the late 1960s, these included suggestions to convert the building into an art museum, a cultural center, a visual research center, or a library for the City College of New York. The New York City Department of Parks and Recreation (NYC Parks) ultimately dedicated the pavilion as part of Flushing Meadows Park in June 1967. The same year, the New York State Legislature passed a bill to allow the city to acquire the building, but the U.S. government ultimately retained control over the structure. The federal government initially employed police officers to guard the building though ultimately did not maintain the structure. NYC Parks, which faced fiscal issues over the next decade, was also unable to keep the pavilion in good shape.

==== Deterioration ====
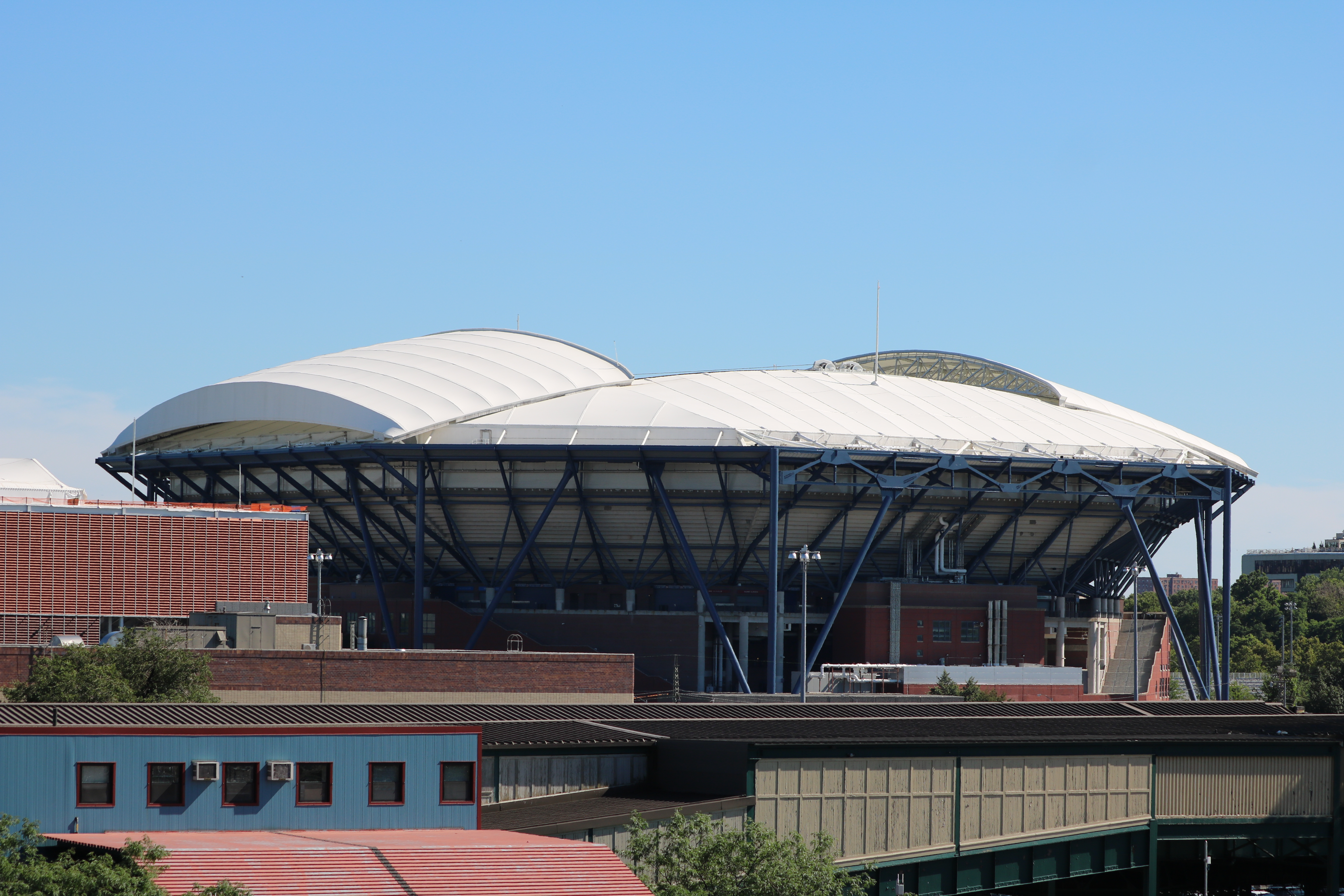
Arthur Ashe Stadium stands on the site of the United States Pavilion.

Federal and city officials had still not agreed on how the building should be used by late 1967. Various proposals for the pavilion's reuse were canceled due to the high cost of renovations. The pavilion's roof began to decay, and the building was extensively vandalized. During one visit to the building, City Council member Emanuel R. Gold (who supported the building's renovation) reported seeing evidence of marijuana use. According to Flushing Meadows Park Action Committee chairman Al Mauro, several small fires were set inside, and there was evidence of squatting on the property.

By 1969, the building still had not been upgraded to meet city building codes, which mandated that temporary structures be torn down after five years. NYC Parks announced in 1969 that the building would be razed at an estimated cost of $500,000. At the time, the city government estimated the cost of renovation at millions of dollars. (Note: The cost has been variously cited as $1–4 million, $2 million or $7 million.) Supporters of the pavilion's preservation claimed that the building could be restored for much less; they estimated the cost of renovations at $750,000. In November 1969, a bill was introduced in the U.S. Senate to provide $350,000 for the pavilion's demolition. A fence was built around the dilapidated pavilion. Congress rejected the appropriation after the Committee for the Establishment of the International Cultural Complex proposed renovating the building. The committee's plans entailed converting the United States Pavilion into a 500-seat art school with a student exchange program.

=== 1970s ===
St. Francis College students David Oats and Eric Ierardi organized the Flushing Meadows Corona Park World's Fair Association in 1970, proposing that the building be converted into a cultural center in advance of the 1976 United States Bicentennial. At that point, the interior was in an advanced state of disrepair, with broken glass, tangled wires, missing fixtures, and dirt everywhere. A squatter had replaced the padlocks, stolen a power transformer, and piled up garbage to block off access to parts of the building. There was graffiti on the facade, and the pools around the pavilion had long since run dry. By 1971, several local community groups had submitted proposals for the reuse of the United States Pavilion. One proposal would have converted the building into the Queens Museum, but the museum instead moved into the nearby New York City Pavilion. Other proposals for the building included an art museum operated by the Queens Art Council; an art complex with a museum, theater, and classrooms operated by the Catan-Rose Art Institute; a children's shelter; and a recreational and cultural hub. Oats also circulated a petition to save the United States Pavilion, receiving 20,000 signatures.

The New York Daily News wrote in 1972 that architects and engineers had determined that the building did not have structural issues. Nonetheless, the city government took no action on any of these proposals, and Ierardi and Oats accused Lindsay of letting the pavilion decay. Later the same year, the Mid-Queens Community Council proposed reusing the building as the National Hall of Health, which would have contained exhibits and programs about health. There were also discussions about using the U.S. Pavilion as an exhibit hall during the bicentennial celebrations. The Flushing Meadows Park Action Committee's records indicate that the city government may have taken over the building in 1973, though city officials denied that they wanted the structure. Donald Manes, the Queens borough president, recommended the same year that the building be used as a bicentennial exhibit hall. The decrepit structure was a popular hangout for drug users, and people continued to trespass despite the presence of the chain-link fence. The New York Daily News reported in 1974 that "it looks like a bomb hit" the interior, and the pavilion was described as "not usable for anything". By then, the cost of demolition was estimated at $2 million, while renovation costs were estimated at $8 million.

Manes requested in March 1974 that the U.S. government either refurbish or raze the pavilion, and the DOC requested $800,000 for the building's demolition from the U.S. Office of Management and Budget in mid-1974. Supporters of the building's preservation said at the time that the building still did not have any structural issues. Marshall Lee of World Festival Associates proposed converting the building into an international festival structure in 1975 at a cost of $6 million. That December, the DOC allocated $530,000 to the GSA to pay for the building's demolition. U.S. Representative Benjamin Rosenthal requested that the DOC delay the demolition in March 1976 so preservationists could find a tenant for the building; the DOC rejected his request. Mauro suggested that the building could be added to the Gateway National Recreation Area, which, at the time, mostly consisted of beaches and wetlands. Despite efforts from preservationists, the GSA began requesting bids from demolition contractors in mid-1976. Eleven companies bid for the contract.

In a final attempt to prevent the demolition, Kathy Friedman of the Mid-Queens Community Council filed a lawsuit that July. Federal judge John Francis Dooling Jr. dismissed Friedman's lawsuit, saying the group had no standing to oppose the demolition. U.S. Representative Mario Biaggi requested that the DOC delay the building's destruction while Congress voted on whether to add part of Flushing Meadows Corona Park to the Gateway National Recreation Area. The DOC denied Biaggi's request in October 1976, and it awarded a $147,000 demolition contract that month. The P.J. Maffei Construction Corporation began wrecking the building in January 1977. The structure caught fire that March while it was being torn down. After demolition was completed in mid-1977, the site was landscaped and flattened to make way for an expansion of the USTA National Tennis Center. Arthur Ashe Stadium was built on the pavilion's site, opening in 1996.

== Description ==
Attractions and geographical features of Flushing Meadows–Corona Park
Attractions and geographical features of Flushing Meadows–Corona Park:
1 Citi Field
2 Etihad Park (under construction)
3 Flushing Meadows Carousel and Queens Zoo
4 Flushing Meadows Corona Park Aquatics Center
5 Flushing River and Creek
6 Meadow Lake and Hong Kong Dragon Boat Festival
7 Metropolitan Park (planned) and Shea Stadium (demolished)
8 Mets–Willets Point subway station
9 Mets–Willets Point LIRR station
10 National Tennis Center and United States Pavilion (demolished)
11 New York Hall of Science
12 New York State Pavilion and Queens Theatre
13 Queens Botanical Garden
14 Queens Museum
15 Queens Night Market
16 Terrace on the Park
17 Unisphere
18 Willow Lake
19 World's Fair subway station (demolished)

The United States Pavilion was a boxy structure designed by Charles Luckman Associates. Leon Deller of Luckman's firm was the primary architect. Severud-Elstad-Krueger was the structural engineer, and Bethlehem Steel provided the steel that was used in the building.

The building occupied a 4.5-acre (1.8 ha) site in the middle of the fairground's Federal and State area, north of the Unisphere. The building was supposed to have been a permanent structure. It was supported by 2,300 pilings. Early plans called for the building to be supported by temporary wood pilings; these were changed to steel-and-concrete pilings during the development process. WFC officials claimed that the building could stand for a century. Unlike some of the other pavilions that charged an admission fee, the United States Pavilion was free to enter.

=== Exterior ===
The structure was equivalent in height to a 8 1/2-story building. It measured 84 feet (26 m) high and was supported by four stilts measuring 18 feet (5.5 m) tall. From above, the building appeared as a hollow square, with a frontage of 330 feet (100 m) on each side. (Note: Ada Louise Huxtable described the sides as measuring 300 feet (91 m) long.) The structure had a translucent facade made of plastic panels, which were cast in various shades of green and blue. (Note: The New York Times characterized the walls as "green and yellow and blue" at night.) The facade reflected the sunlight during the daytime and were illuminated from inside during the nighttime. The rear (north) wall of the pavilion contained Paul von Ringelheim's sculpture World Peace Screen, which was commissioned by Fairleigh Dickinson University and shipped to the university campus after the fair. The wall weighed 9,500 pounds (4,300 kg) and measured 35 feet (11 m) wide by 8.5 feet (2.6 m) tall.

In front of the pavilion was John F. Kennedy Plaza, where work by 19 American sculptors was displayed. The plaza's sculptures were all cast between 1958 and 1964, with the exception of Jacques Lipchitz's sculpture Song of the Vowels, which was finished in 1932. The building was accessed by various escalators and stairs around the plaza. The staircases were the largest on the fairground, with 72 steps divided into four flights. They were shaped like the sides of pyramids, narrowing to 4 feet (1.2 m) at their tops. There was a secondary wheelchair-accessible entrance. The structure was surrounded by a moat with fountains, which was spanned by four bridges.

At the center of the building was an open-air garden court, which linked all of the pavilion's exhibits and included shrubs, trees, and sculpture. Luckman intended for the garden court to give visitors an "atmosphere of peaceful relief". The garden court contained a quote from Archibald MacLeish, which read: "The American Journey has not yet ended. America is never accomplished. America is always to build." The building's primary stilts were located at each corner of the court. The building was cantilevered 75 feet (23 m) inward from these stilts. At the time of the building's construction, The Christian Science Monitor said it was "believed to be the largest building cantilever project ever erected". The inner walls were constructed out of trusses measuring 182 feet (55 m) long and 57 feet (17 m) high. There were two pairs of trusses along the inner walls and another two pairs on the outer walls.

=== Interior ===
Inside the building were two above-ground exhibit floors. When the building was under construction, Winston estimated that the United States Pavilion could accommodate 40,000 people per day. The pavilion hosted stationary displays and employed Peace Corps volunteers, who talked about their experiences in the Peace Corps. Visitors first watched a film in the building's 600-seat theater before they rode the American Journey attraction on the building's second floor. After exiting the American Journey attraction, they could access the rest of the exhibits. The building had elevators and wheelchair-accessible restrooms, and the pavilion's staff helped handicapped visitors navigate the pavilion. One source described the spaces as climate-controlled, although the pavilion lacked a heating system.

==== Exhibit spaces ====
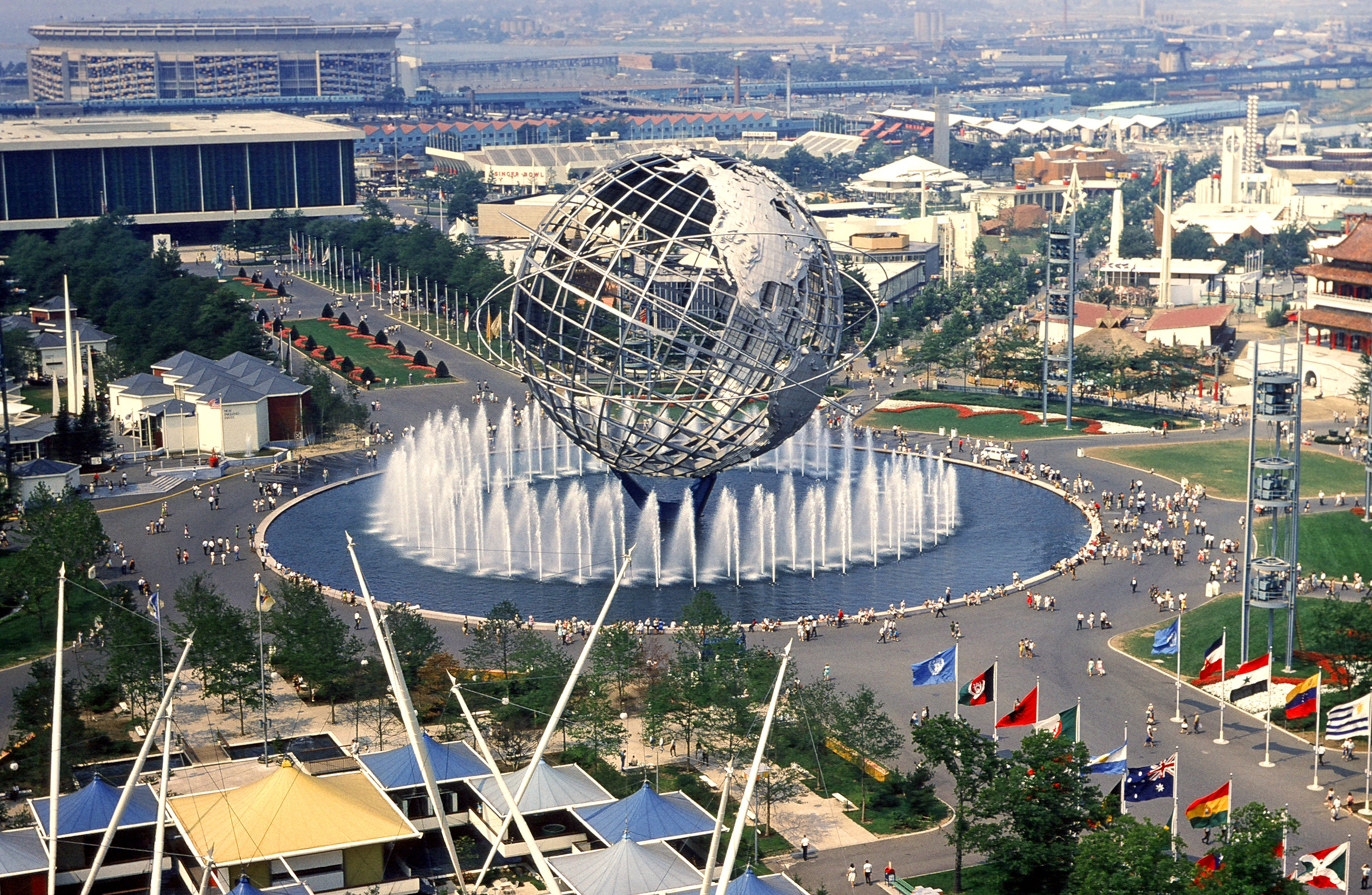
In this view of the Unisphere from the New York State Pavilion, the United States Pavilion is visible at left.

The first floor had a panorama depicting the United States in the 1960s and the future of the U.S. Displayed in the building's foyer was a 380-pound (170 kg), gilded wooden sculpture of an eagle, which was designed by United States Navy diver Ernst Benson. A quote from Lyndon B. Johnson, "Greatness is a challenge, not a conclusion", was displayed on the foyer wall. The Challenge to Greatness exhibit, on the same floor, was divided into three sections about freedom, the history of the land, and "New America". There was another exhibit space, the Exhibit Hall of the Great Society, with seven sections about various aspects of American culture, technology, history, and economy. In addition, the pavilion had two scientific exhibits: Challenge of Freedom, which was themed to progress, and Challenge of a Peaceful World, which showcased technology.

The pavilion displayed models, paintings, photos, posters, and other objects relating to American history and culture. An interactive chart showed the position of every man-made space object, and a 7-by-4-foot (2.1 by 1.2 m) diorama of the Morton neighborhood in Philadelphia was on display. A 42-by-30-foot (12.8 by 9.1 m) replica of the Star-Spangled Banner flag was installed at the U.S. Pavilion as well; the flag was originally created for the nearby Maryland Pavilion, whose operators could not find space to display the flag there.

The pavilion also included an 8,000-square-foot (740 m^{2}) hall of presidents, which displayed artifacts from 13 U.S. presidents. At the entrance to the hall was a quote by Lyndon B. Johnson, crediting Kennedy with devising the idea for the hall. The hall, which operated only during the 1965 season, had been used as storage space during 1964. There were items from George Washington, John Adams, Thomas Jefferson, Andrew Jackson, James K. Polk, Abraham Lincoln, Grover Cleveland, Theodore Roosevelt, Woodrow Wilson, Franklin D. Roosevelt, Harry S. Truman, Dwight D. Eisenhower, and John F. Kennedy. The artifacts included Washington's first inaugural address, Lincoln's two inaugural addresses, a copy of the United States Bill of Rights, the Emancipation Proclamation, and the Gettysburg Address. The hall also exhibited presidents' personal belongings, such as a pistol, lock of hair, campaign sign, and chair. Each president's items was placed in a different section of the hall. The objects were protected continuously by ultrasonic alarms, in addition to security guards.

==== Library and auditoriums ====
There was a 10,000-square-foot (930 m^{2}) library operated by the American Library Association, which had additional information on the topics mentioned in the Challenge to Greatness exhibit. The library contained items from the President's Library at the White House. The library also contained UNIVAC 490 computers, where visitors could search up information about the exhibits. Visitors could print out bibliographies related to their queries, and visitors in several other American cities could remotely use the UNIVAC 490 devices to look up information. Visitors could also listen to book reviews at the library, and there were daily storytelling sessions as well. The storytelling sessions were hosted in a room called the Children's World, where storytellers could dim the lights and display scenes on film projectors. There were also study areas for school groups, with TVs where lessons and documentaries could be displayed.

On the building's lower level, there was a 200-seat auditorium and a 600-seat theater. The larger theater screened a short film, Voyage to America, a 9-to-12 minute documentary about immigration to the United States. The film, directed by John Houseman, included a musical score composed by Virgil Thomson. The nearby auditorium was used for special events such as meetings, lectures, and recitals. In contrast to other countries' pavilions that displayed sculptures, paintings and artifacts, the United States Pavilion's auditorium mainly hosted performing arts. The United States Pavilion was originally supposed to include a third venue with 600 seats, which was intended to be a performing arts theater, but the theater was canceled before the building was completed.

==== American Journey attraction ====
Occupying the second floor was the American Journey, an amusement park–style dark ride attraction. It consisted of an approximately 15-minute tour scripted by the science-fiction novelist Ray Bradbury. The American Journey attraction included realistic sound effects, such as the sounds of rockets taking off, and it also included live performances and displays of artifacts.

Accompanying the tour was a Cinerama film, which was also called American Journey. The film depicted scenes from four centuries of American and pre-American history, with one- and two-sentence summaries of major events. There were clips from old films produced by Paramount Pictures, depictions of American landscapes, and "unusual and historic sequences" filmed throughout the United States. Cinerama filmed other parts of the movie at its studio in Redwood City, California. The footage was displayed on more than a hundred screens, (Note: Sources disagree on whether the ride had 120 or 130 screens. One source gives a figure of 150 screens.) which surrounded the ride's track. Most of the screens were flat and rectangular; there were also domed and hexagonal screens, as well as a rectangular screen with 151 domes. The actor John McIntire narrated the film, which was dictated in the second person singular to give visitors the impression that they were personally involved in various aspects of American history. Donald Specht composed the film's score. The film was shortened and simplified during the 1965 season.

The ride itself consisted of twelve vehicles, each seating 54–55 passengers. (Note: Sources agree on the number of vehicles but disagree on whether the ride vehicles could seat 54 or 55 passengers.) The vehicles traveled along a winding tunnel, which measured 1,200 feet (370 m) or 1,250 feet (380 m) long. Vehicles departed from a loading station every 80 seconds, which gave the ride an hourly capacity of about 2,500 passengers. Each vehicle measured about 16 feet (4.9 m) across and 18 feet (5.5 m) long, with raised seats at the rear. Each rider had their own headset, which allowed visitors to listen to the film in English and four other languages.

== Reception ==
=== Architectural commentary ===
Luckman's initial design for the pavilion was not well received. An editorial for Architectural Forum described the original plans as "three giant flying saucers, seemingly suspended in mid-air, and looking rather like the familiar pawnshop sign known to every inhabitant of every skid row". William Walton described the building as "a weird-looking thing, like a giant plant-stand". The redesigned pavilion received mixed commentary. Time magazine said that "Charles Luckman with his severely simple United States Pavilion" was probably the only American architect at the fair whose pavilion deserved special notice. A Progressive Architecture guidebook likened the building to "a gigantic ice-cream sandwich" with a blue and green plastic filling. By contrast, the critic Vincent Scully Jr. derided the pavilion as a "pompous pile of absolutely nothing".

When the building was completed, the Christian Science Monitor said the "use of lightweight structural glass has reached new artistic zeniths" in the U.S. and New York State pavilions. A critic for the Boston Globe described the building as an "extremely beautiful building", and a Chicago Tribune writer called the United States Pavilion "one of the most impressive buildings in the [fairground's] federal and state section". Americas magazine likened the building to "a huge box floating in space with a facade of multicolored glass". The American Institute of Steel Construction gave the building an architectural award in 1964, and Newsday wrote that, during the fair, the pavilion had received largely positive reviews from architects. In a 1972 study of World's Fair architecture at Flushing Meadows, the Flushing Meadows Corona Park World's Fair Association and the Queens Historical Society wrote that the U.S. Pavilion was one of several "interesting examples of architectural innovations of their respective periods".

=== Exhibit commentary ===
Variety magazine described the American Journey ride as unusual, saying that the ride vehicles allowed "the audience [to] become an actual participant" in the namesake film. A Christian Science Monitor critic wrote of the American Journey and Voyage to America films: "I think you will leave with a feeling of vivid renewal." Newsweek described the American Journey film as "technically the most interesting and economically the most impressive film at the fair", praising the placement of the screens along the ride's track. A critic for The Baltimore Sun praised the complexity of the ride but said "a less hectic pace might leave a more lasting impression of the picture content".

During the fair's second season, Bosley Crowther wrote in The New York Times that the simplified American Journey film "packs its message more clearly" compared with the version that was shown during the first season. Lawrence R. Samuel wrote retrospectively in 2007 that the American Journey "was a tour de force of equal parts patriotism and entertainment".

== See also ==
- 1964 New York World's Fair pavilions
