= Terrace on the Park =

Banquet hall in Queens, New York

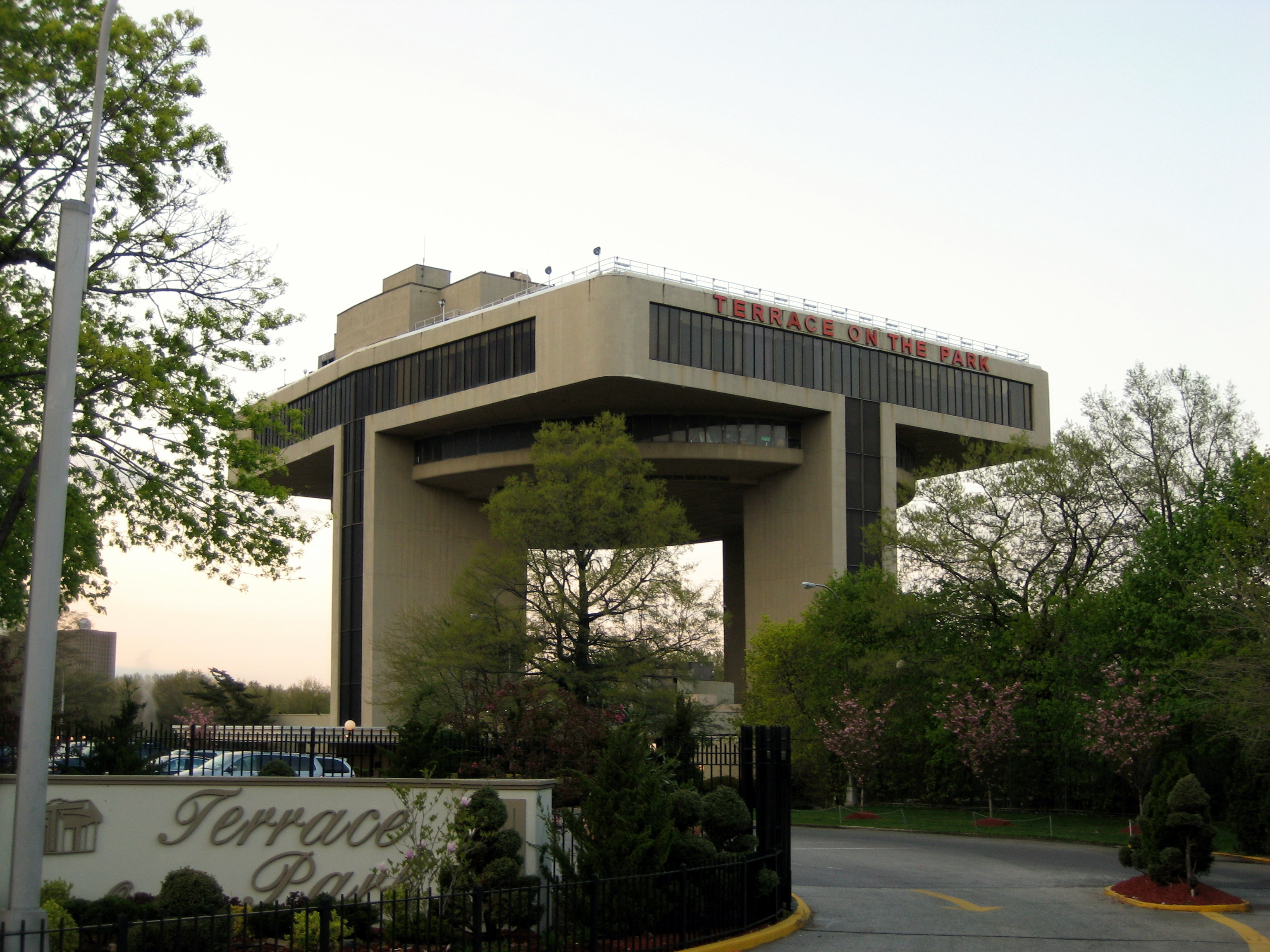
- The building seen in 2008
- Former names: Port Authority Pavilion

General information
- Location: 52-11 111th Street, Queens, New York, United States
- Coordinates: 40°44′41″N 73°51′03″W
- Year built: 1961–1963
- Opened: October 16, 1963
- Owner: New York City Department of Parks and Recreation

Height
- Height: 120 feet (37 m)

Technical details
- Floor count: 3 (+ ground level)

Design and construction
- Architect: Allan Gordon Lorimer
- Main contractor: W. J. Barney Corporation

Website
- www.terraceonthepark.com

Terrace on the Park is a banquet hall at 52-11 111th Street, within Flushing Meadows–Corona Park, in the Corona neighborhood of Queens in New York City, New York, U.S. The building was constructed by the Port Authority of New York and New Jersey as the Port Authority Pavilion, an exhibition building and heliport for the 1964 New York World's Fair. The building was designed by chief architect Allan Gordon Lorimer, engineers John Kyle and Ray Monti, and planning chief E. Donald Mills. It is south of the New York Hall of Science.

Robert Moses, the president of the World's Fair Corporation, had wanted to develop a heliport with a restaurant as part of the 1964 World's Fair. The Port of New York Authority, which developed the fair's transportation zone, announced in September 1961 that it would erect a restaurant and heliport in that zone. The Port Authority Building opened on October 16, 1963, several months before the fair opened. During the fair's 1964 and 1965 seasons, the building included a rooftop heliport, the Top of the Fair restaurant, and an exhibit space at ground level. Afterward, the building was converted into an event venue owned by the New York City Department of Parks and Recreation. The structure was renovated in the 2010s.

The bulk of the building is placed atop four stilts, each measuring 120 feet (37 m) high, which are connected by a circular truss near the top of the building. Because of the stilt placements, each side of the building is shaped like the letter "T". On ground level, there was formerly an exhibit area with a circular theater. The restaurant is near the top of the stilts and is spread across two levels. The building's roof originally functioned as a heliport, but has since been converted to an outdoor terrace.

== World's Fair use ==
Flushing Meadows–Corona Park, a former ash dump in the New York City borough of Queens, was used for the 1939/1940 New York World's Fair. At the conclusion of the fair, it was used as a park. The Flushing Meadows site was selected in 1959 for the 1964 New York World's Fair. Gilmore David Clarke and Michael Rapuano, designers of the original World's Fair layout, were retained to tailor the original 1939 park layout for the new fair. New York City parks commissioner Robert Moses was president of the World's Fair Corporation, which leased the park from the city until 1967, after the fair's completion. The WFC appointed Guy F. Tozzoli of the Port of New York Authority in 1960 to develop the fair's transportation zone.

=== Development and opening ===
Early on in the fair's development, Moses was planning a heliport with a restaurant. In September 1961, the Port of New York Authority announced that it would erect an exhibition building and heliport on a 1.25-acre (0.51 ha) land lot in the fair's transportation section. The plans called for a 120-foot-tall (37 m) structure with a 1,000-seat restaurant, which was to cost about $2.4 million. Additionally, New York Airways proposed operating a fleet of seven 25-seat helicopters between the heliport and Manhattan; the helicopters were Boeing 107s that could operate at up to 155 miles per hour (249 km/h). At the time, the building was projected to be completed in January 1964. Moses wanted the building's restaurant to be operated by either Restaurant Associates, who operated the Four Seasons Restaurant in Manhattan, or the 21 Club's operators. Both operators would only agree to operate the restaurant if someone else developed the structure, which Moses was unwilling to do.

The WFC created a scale model of the fairground, including the heliport, in early 1962. In the middle of that year, Knott Hotel Corporation agreed to operate the pavilion's restaurant, which was to be called Top of the Fair and occupy two stories. The Port Authority awarded a general construction contract for the heliport to the W. J. Barney Corporation in November 1962 for $3.7 million, having rejected seven other bids as too expensive. U.S. Steel's American Bridge Company fabricated the structure. Niles Communications Centers Inc. created a 360-degree film of New York City for the pavilion, using a rig with 10 cameras to collect footage from trucks, boats, and helicopters. United Aircraft was also hired to operate the building's heliport; it would pay the Port Authority $750,000, plus a portion of any revenue exceeding $2.6 million. The building's opening date was pushed forward to October 1963 to allow exhibitors to begin hosting events there.

The Port Authority Building opened on October 16, 1963, with a ceremony attended by hundreds of people; it was the first completed structure on the World's Fair site. The first event to take place at the building, a party for the Travelers Aid Society of New York, had taken place the day before. Media sources estimated that the building had cost $2.6 million or $2.7 million. The restaurant originally did not have an in-house band, even though there were plans to add one. The restaurant started receiving guests while the rest of the fairground was being developed, but the exhibit at the building's ground level remained closed until the beginning of the fair. During late 1963, helicopters began making test flights between the Port Authority Pavilion and heliports in Manhattan. United Aircraft and New York Airways signed an agreement in early 1964, allowing New York Airways to operate helicopters from the building. New York Airways also received the exclusive right to use the heliport. The WFC anticipated that the vast majority of fairground visitors would arrive by car, bus, taxi, or train, with a negligible number using the heliport or the World's Fair Marina. Because of a lack of competition from other restaurants on the fairground, Top of the Fair initially was successful.

=== 1964 season ===
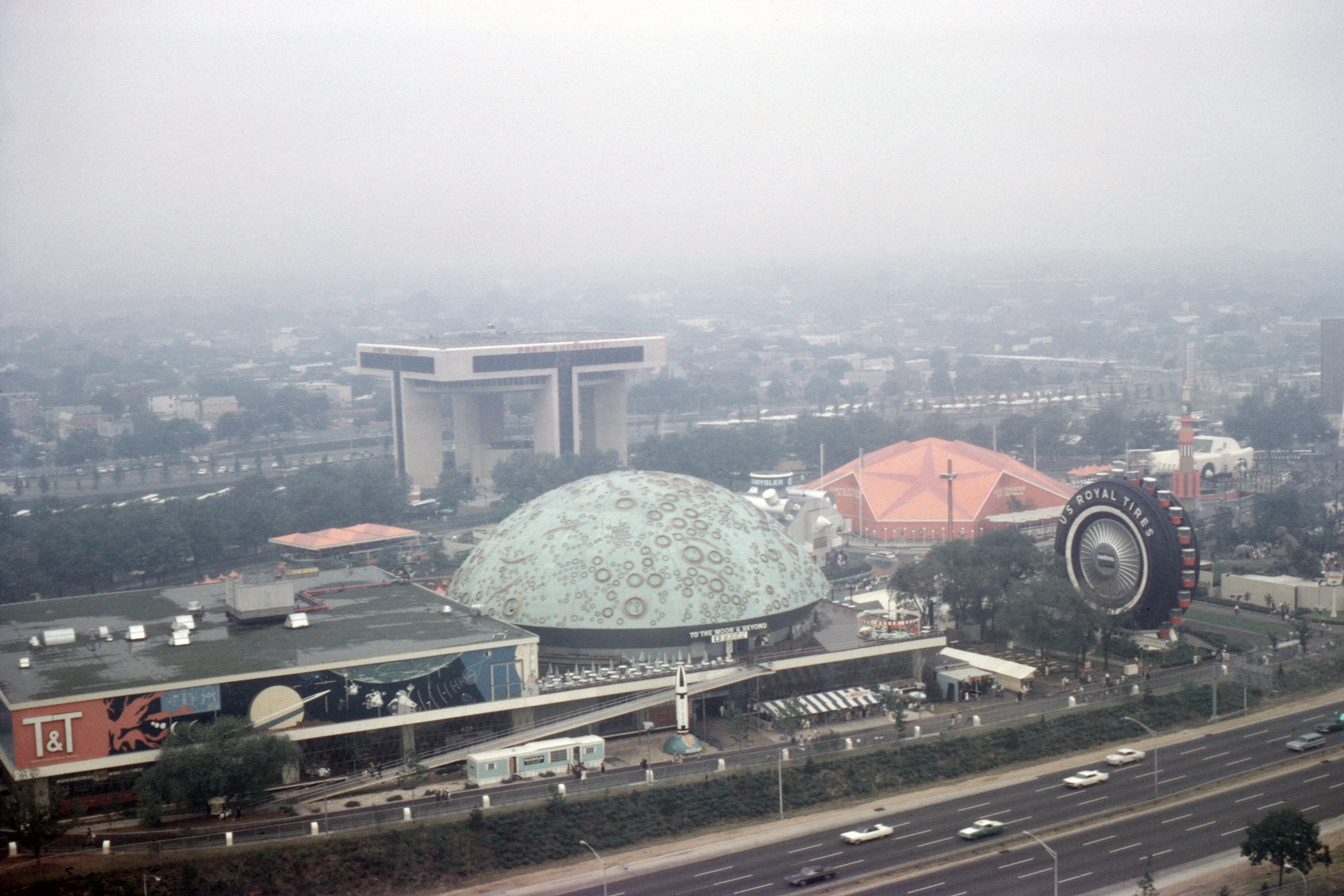
Aerial view of the 1964 fair's transportation zone; the Port Authority Heliport is in the background. Also visible is the Transportation and Travel Pavilion in the center and the Uniroyal Giant Tire at far right.

The World's Fair formally opened on April 22, 1964, but New York Airways' flights from the building did not begin for another five days because of bad weather. The structure was an icon of the fairground's transportation zone, since it could be seen from almost any other part of the fairground. During the fair, the Port Authority referred to the building as the fair's "aerial gateway" or the "air gateway to the fair". There was an exhibition space at ground level, the Top of the Fair restaurant just under the roof, and the heliport atop the roof. New York Airways operated flights to JFK Airport, Newark Airport, and the Downtown Manhattan Heliport, as well as sightseeing flights across the fairground. There had been plans to operate flights to and from the Pan Am Building, but that heliport was not operating because of complaints from tenants in Midtown Manhattan. (Note: The Pan Am heliport did not open until the end of 1965.) The heliport could accommodate 20 flights an hour, and visitors paid up to $6.50 (equivalent to $67.48 in 2025) for a six-minute helicopter ride.

Top of the Fair originally served international cuisine and was open daily. Excluding beverage costs, the restaurant's typical dinners cost $5 to $7.50, and patrons also had to pay the fair's admission fee just to access the restaurant. Visitors had to pay another $1 to get a menu, and photographers roamed around taking pictures of guests. New York Times food critic Craig Claiborne wrote that the restaurant's original cuisine consisted mostly of French dishes with some Greek fare, while Clementine Paddleford characterized the food as continental cuisine. The dishes served at the restaurant initially included oysters, liver, crab ravigote, and assorted hors d'oeuvres. The restaurant served only one type of coffee: an instant coffee brand made by Chase and Sanborn. The 250-member private club, the Terrace Club, charged a $1,200 membership fee; the club's board of directors included the diplomat Ralph Bunche. The WFC initially anticipated that the Port Authority pavilion's restaurant would accommodate up to 30,000 visitors a day, and Moses often held receptions for guests there. The building's exhibition space had a 360-degree film about New York City, which was known as From Every Horizon. The exhibit also had a scale model of the original World Trade Center.

Initially, the helicopters carried 800 to 900 guests a day, but most fairground visitors walked past the building without going inside. That June, as part of an agreement between New York Airways and Trans World Airlines, helicopters began operating between the Port Authority Pavilion and the TWA Flight Center at JFK Airport. By mid-1964, diners had complained about Top of the Fair's poor service and high prices, and the restaurant faced competition from more than a hundred other eateries on the fairground. Restaurant Associates was negotiating to take over the restaurant's operation. Top of the Fair filed for bankruptcy protection that August, though Knott Hotels continued to operate the restaurant. The next month, the building began exhibiting images taken by the Port Authority's photographers.

=== 1965 season ===
After the fair's first season ended on October 18, 1964, the restaurant atop the Port Authority Pavilion was supposed to have continued operating during the off-season. However, Top of the Fair quietly closed after Knott and the restaurant's creditors could not come to an agreement. A court-appointed trustee took over the restaurant on November 17; he sold off Top of the Fair's food and wine collections. Restaurant Associates took over Top of the Fair in March 1965, and Frederick Rufe became the restaurant's manager. Restaurant Associates hired Monte Streitfeld to design uniforms for Top of the Fair's waitstaff. George Lois of the advertising firm Papert Koenig Lois promoted the restaurant on television, radio, and magazines, using images of the Port Authority Building to attract guests. A bar in San Juan, Puerto Rico, copied one of Top of the Fair's advertisements, a cartoon, for its own use. Carpenters also renovated the restaurant.

The building's exhibits reopened when the fair's second season began on April 21, 1965. Restaurant Associates reduced food prices at Top of the Fair; patrons could eat luncheons for less than $3 and dinners for as little as $4.95. The restaurant also hosted dances twice a week. The WFC agreed to waive the fair's admission fee for the restaurant's diners; fairground visitors who dined at the restaurant received an invisible ink stamp on their hand, entitling them to re-enter the fairground for free. Top of the Fair's revamped menu included hors d'oeuvres such as salad, shrimp, and beans; a course of soup; and a variety of entrees such as stuffed flounder, lamb, ribs, and steaks. The restaurant also served 19 types of dessert, including tarts, cakes, pies, and sherbets. In addition, attendants pushed around carts full of delicacies, and there was more food near the walls.

By that July, Top of the Fair had stopped serving luncheon meals due to a lack of patronage, and it began operating only during suppertime. By contrast, the restaurant was popular at night, in part because people no longer had to pay to enter. The heliport's patrons included Princess Benedikte of Denmark, as well as rock band The Beatles, whose helicopter landed there prior to their August 1965 concert at Shea Stadium. The exhibits closed when the second season ended on October 17, 1965. Top of the Fair had been among the fair's most successful high-priced restaurants. Though Moses had recommended that most pavilions be demolished after the fair ended, the Port Authority heliport was among the few structures that were to be preserved. The Port Authority put aside some funds to pay for the structure's demolition, but Moses had rejected the Port Authority's offer.

== After the fair ==
=== Early plans ===
Attractions and geographical features of Flushing Meadows–Corona Park
Attractions and geographical features of Flushing Meadows–Corona Park:
1 Citi Field
2 Etihad Park (under construction)
3 Flushing Meadows Carousel and Queens Zoo
4 Flushing Meadows Corona Park Aquatics Center
5 Flushing River and Creek
6 Meadow Lake and Hong Kong Dragon Boat Festival
7 Metropolitan Park (planned) and Shea Stadium (demolished)
8 Mets–Willets Point subway station
9 Mets–Willets Point LIRR station
10 National Tennis Center and United States Pavilion (demolished)
11 New York Hall of Science
12 New York State Pavilion and Queens Theatre
13 Queens Botanical Garden
14 Queens Museum
15 Queens Night Market
16 Terrace on the Park
17 Unisphere
18 Willow Lake
19 World's Fair subway station (demolished)

When the fair ended, Baum wanted to continue operating the restaurants and convert the ground-floor space to an event venue. There was also a proposal for the Community Center of Long Island to take over the structure. The Terrace Club and Top of the Fair remained open under an informal gentlemen's agreement and a two-year contract with the WFC. The New York City Department of Parks and Recreation (NYC Parks) announced in late 1965 that it would take over the Port Authority Pavilion as part of the development of the neighboring Queens Zoo. NYC Parks took over the pavilion that December. Restaurant Associates closed the restaurant in January 1966, saying that it was losing $100,000 a year from Top of the Park's operation.

After Top of the Fair closed, the building's ultimate disposition was uncertain, as the city's parks commissioner Thomas Hoving, wanted the city government to reconsider its decision to take over the building. NYC Parks contemplated demolishing the structure or converting it into a theater–restaurant. Hoving estimated that, if no restaurant operator were found, the city would have to spend up to $400,000 to demolish the building. NYC Parks was still looking for an operator for the restaurant by early 1967. The city government took over Flushing Meadows–Corona Park, including the former Port Authority Pavilion, from the WFC in June 1967. The building remained unoccupied until 1969, but the city was unwilling to pay for the building's demolition.

=== Use as event venue ===
In 1969, Continental Hosts took over the concession for the building, which was renamed Terrace on the Park. Over the years, Terrace on the Park has held mayoral events, weddings, and high school proms. The events at the building have included several extravagant events; for example, one groom rode a horse to the building, while a boy celebrating his bar mitzvah rode a baby elephant into a ballroom. Another notable event at the building, a party for the Ghanaian king Otumfuo Nana Osei Tutu II, included women dancing barefoot. The singer Madonna worked there as an elevator operator in the 1970s, and the actress Fran Drescher was married there.

==== Continental Hosts use ====
After taking over Terrace on the Park in 1969, Continental Hosts spent either $2.5 million or $3 million on renovations. The project included dividing the original restaurant into several smaller spaces, and the new operators constructed an additional ballroom named the Penthouse on the old heliport. As part of its agreement with the city, Terrace on the Park's operators paid about 7% of the venue's total revenue to the city government. The structure was being used for events such as bar and bat mitzvahs and weddings by late 1969. The operators also wanted to convert the ground level into another restaurant. Terrace on the Park employed a staff of musicians, florists, and photographers for each wedding that took place there. The building also contained a restaurant called Feathers in the Park during the 1970s. Feathers on the Park, which specialized in American cuisine, was closed sometime in the 1980s due to a lack of revenue.

Due to an oversight, the city government had failed to install separate utility meters for the building following the World's Fair, and the city paid for the building's electricity for several years without realizing it. Lewin agreed to install electric and gas meters in 1979 after the city threatened to sue him for $1.7 million. The Lewin family's concession was almost revoked because of the electric-bill dispute. The disagreement was not fully resolved until 1985, when the city agreed to continue leasing the building to the Lewin family until 1993. In exchange, the Lewins agreed to pay the city $1 million, half of which was used to pay for new meters.

Even though the Levins' lease required them to open the building to the public, Terrace on the Park was operating exclusively as a catering venue by the 1980s. The venue earned about $56 million between 1983 and 1988, and it had 135 full-time employees during that decade. At the time, the building hosted about 40 proms per year, as well as club meetings, weddings, and other parties. In addition, various food-cart operators sold food and drinks to park visitors at the building's base. The concessionaires attempted to build a cafe near the building in the late 1980s, but the renovation of the nearby Queens Zoo caused the cafe to be canceled. By 1996, the Levins' lease was about to expire, and NYC Parks was looking for a concessionaire who would reopen a restaurant in the building.

==== Makkos and Kaloidis use ====
Continental Hosts' lease of Terrace on the Park expired in early 1997, and NYC Parks began looking for a new operator. The same year, NYC Parks leased the building to Crystal Ball Group, whose executives included George Makkos and his brother Thomas. Subsequently, George Makkos and his business partner Jimmy Kaloidis took over Terrace on the Park's operation. During the late 1990s and early 2000s, the building was renovated at a cost of $8 million or $12 million. Although the original restaurant space and penthouse were still in use, the cocktail lounge below it had been converted to storage space. By the late 2000s, Terrace on the Park's operators were trying to entice corporate clients to host events at the building; at the time, the venue accommodated about 200 annual events for businesses and organizations. Despite emailing event planners regularly for two years, Terrace on the Park was unable to attract additional clients. City controller John Liu alleged in 2010 that Terrace on the Park's operators had failed to build a restaurant there, despite a promise to do so; NYC Parks said a snack bar had been built in place of the restaurant.

By 2011, the building hosted up to 40 events per month, and it often held weddings and proms simultaneously. Because of Queens's extremely high ethnic diversity, the venue served a wide variety of cuisine, in addition to kosher and halal food. NYC Parks began soliciting bidders for Terrace on the Park's lease in mid-2013. At the time, Makkos and Kaloidis's existing lease was about to expire, and Makkos and Kaloidis wanted to renovate the banquet hall. A $9 million renovation of Terrace on the Park was completed in September 2017. The building continues to be operated by the privately held Crystal Ball Group, which operates the building as a catering hall for weddings, proms and other events. Every year, the firm pays the New York City Department of Parks and Recreation either 20% of its gross receipts or $2.5 million, whichever is greater.

== Description ==
Terrace on the Park is located at 52-11 111th Street within Flushing Meadows–Corona Park in Queens, New York City, near the intersection with 52nd Avenue. The Port Authority's engineering team designed Terrace on the Park. Allan Gordon Lorimer was the chief architect, working alongside engineers John Kyle and Ray Monti and planning chief E. Donald Mills. In addition, W. J. Barney Corporation was the general contractor, and M. Parisi & Son built the foundation.

There are gardens surrounding the building, as well as a gazebo nearby. The New York Hall of Science is directly to the north, while the Queens Zoo is to the south and east. The former site of the Underground World Home is between Terrace on the Park and the Hall of Science. Other structures in the park, such as the Unisphere, USTA Billie Jean King National Tennis Center, and Citi Field, are visible from the top of the building.

=== Exterior ===
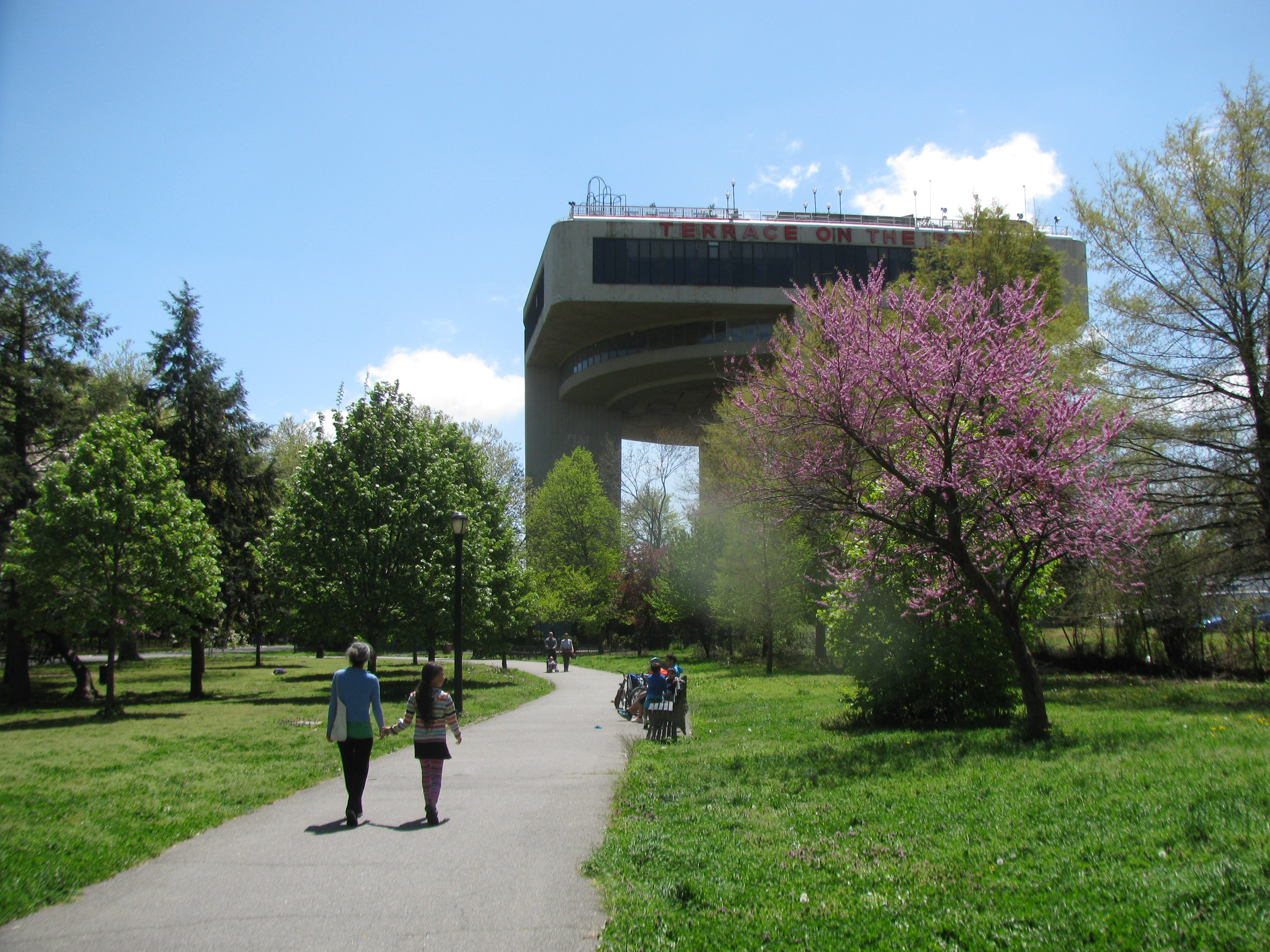
The building as seen from further inside Flushing Meadows–Corona Park

The bulk of the building is placed atop four stilts, each measuring 120 feet (37 m) high. The building has a rectangular plan as viewed from above. The stilts are placed at the center of each of the building's elevations, giving the structure a "T" shape when viewed from the side; the shape stood for the word "transportation". The stilts contain stairs and elevators, and the tops of each stilt are connected by elliptical box girders. The entire building measures about 160 by 210 feet (49 by 64 m). Atop the stilts was a heliport, variously cited as measuring 150 by 200 feet (46 m × 61 m) or 175 by 200 feet (53 m × 61 m). The heliport was replaced with a ballroom named the Penthouse in the 1960s, and it was being used as an exterior terrace by the 2010s. There is a wedding pergola atop the roof, and the rooftop terrace is clad with 12,000 pavers.

=== Interior ===
==== Ground level ====
As designed, the ground floor contained 26,000 square feet (2,400 m^{2}) of exhibit space for the Port Authority. This exhibition space had a 250-seat theater that displayed a 360-degree film. Visitors had to stand to see the film's images, which were displayed on the walls using ten projectors. The ground-floor theater could be used as a theater in the round or as an exhibit space with up to 400 people. The space measured 60 feet (18 m) in diameter and was surrounded by a screen with a circumference of 195 feet (59 m). Due to the shape of the screen, visitors had to view it while standing up. Access to the building's rooftop heliport, restaurant, and observatory was through the exhibit space. By the 21st century, the ground-story space was an event space decorated in the Baroque architectural style.

==== Restaurant spaces ====
Beneath the heliport was a restaurant, which was variously cited as having 1,000 or 1,100 seats. The restaurant was surrounded by a glass wall and included the 250-seat Terrace Club. The restaurant spaces were designed by Lorimer, along with art director Arturo Pini di San Miniato, interior designer Chandler Cudlipp, and architect Berger & Hennessy. The main section of the building originally had a high ceiling painted gold and blue. After the fair, the restaurant spaces were divided into five rooms known as the Penthouse, Grand Ballroom, Regency, Terrace, and Garden. Each of these rooms had a separate reception room, coat check, and kitchen. By the 2010s, the building's interior had been divided into three large ballrooms, surrounded by smaller function rooms.

The restaurant originally had several pieces of artwork. The painter Lumen Martin Winter painted a 28-foot-wide (8.5 m) canvas for the restaurant called Venus and Apollo. Luis Quintanilla designed three murals for the main part of the restaurant, and watercolors and engravings were exhibited in the Terrace Club. Rube Goldberg created a cartoon called How to Cure World's Fair Tired Feet for the building; the cartoon depicted an assortment of gadgets and characters. Another artwork depicted public-works projects that Moses had been involved with—such as Jones Beach State Park, Robert Moses Niagara Power Plant, and the Verrazzano–Narrows Bridge—though Moses denied that he had any involvement with the mural.

There was a circular observatory underneath the restaurant and a cocktail lounge named Around the World on the same floor. The cocktail lounge had 400 seats when it opened. When the World's Fair was in operation, the cocktail lounge was placed on the circumference of the floor, and there were two rows of tables arranged around a circular aisle. These tables surrounded a kitchen at the center of the building, and two escalators connected the kitchen with the main restaurant level. Following the 2010s renovation, a promenade was built below the ballroom, within the former lounge. The promenade includes two 200-seat suites known as the Lotus and Marquis suites.

== Reception ==
When the building opened, a writer for the New York Daily News described the building as "a landing table perched on 15-story legs". Robert A. M. Stern and the co-authors of his book New York 1960 wrote that the building "was decidedly uninspired", despite serving as a gateway to the World's Fair, and a writer for Progressive Architecture lamented that the structure would remain after the fair. Writing retrospectively about the fair in 2007, Lawrence R. Samuel described the Port Authority Pavilion as "another symbol of [Moses's] status as a power broker for half a century". In 2011, local preservationist Jeffrey Kroessler described the building as "a symbol of exuberant mid-1960s optimism about a space-age future" that symbolized when helicopter travel was a futuristic way to travel. Joseph Tirella, in another retrospective of the World's Fair, said that the building was "a modernist rectangular box" and that the original restaurant had been "much maligned".

Of the Top of the Fair restaurant, Craig Claiborne wrote in 1963 that the decorations, service, and food varied widely in quality. After the restaurant's renovation in 1965, Claiborne described the restaurant as "a thoroughly respectable place with an impressive menu and a commendable amount of imagination", and a writer for Newsday referred to the refurbished restaurant as "the great success story of the year".

== See also ==
- 1964 New York World's Fair pavilions
