= IND World's Fair Line =

New York City Subway line (1939–40)

- A colored image of a GG train on the IND World's Fair Line c. 1939. This is one of the few color pictures of the line in existence.

Overview
- Status: Demolished
- Locale: Queens, New York City, New York, US
- Termini: East of 71st Avenue Station; World's Fair Station, Flushing Meadows–Corona Park
- Stations: 1

Service
- Type: Rapid transit
- System: New York City Subway; Independent Subway System
- Services: IND Queens Boulevard Line
- Depot: Jamaica Yard
- Rolling stock: R1-9

History
- Opened: April 30, 1939
- Closed: October 28, 1940

Technical
- Line length: 8,400 feet (2,600 m)
- Track gauge: 1,435 mm (4 ft 8 1/2 in) standard gauge

The IND World's Fair Line, officially the World's Fair Railroad, was a temporary branch of the Independent Subway System (IND) serving the 1939 New York World's Fair in Queens, New York City, United States. Part of the New York City Subway, it split from the IND Queens Boulevard Line at an existing flying junction east of Forest Hills–71st Avenue station, ran through the Jamaica Yard and then ran northeast and north through Flushing Meadows–Corona Park, roughly along the current path of the Van Wyck Expressway. The line continued along a wooden trestle to the World's Fair station, located slightly south of Horace Harding Boulevard (now the Long Island Expressway). The station, the only one on the line, had two tracks and three platforms.

The line was proposed in 1936, and the New York state legislature approved the line's construction the next year. Construction began in early 1938. The line and station were only open in 1939 and 1940 during the fair's two operating seasons. Passengers had to pay a ten-cent fare to use this line, double the subway's standard five-cent fare. The Interborough Rapid Transit and the Brooklyn Manhattan Transit operated a competing service to the fair via the World's Fair station of their joint-operated IRT Flushing Line. The World's Fair Railroad and station are the only IND line and station to have been closed and demolished.

== History ==
=== Development ===
In 1935, New York City Parks commissioner Robert Moses selected the then-new Flushing Meadows Park in central Queens for the 1939 New York World's Fair. New York City Board of Transportation (BOT) chairman John H. Delaney convened a group of transit officials and engineers in January 1936 to discuss plans for rapid transit to and from the fairground. At the time, the Queens Boulevard Line of the city-operated Independent Subway System (IND) was being extended to Union Turnpike, and the Jamaica Yard was being built in Flushing Meadows as a storage depot for trains. The Queens Boulevard Line's construction was expedited in advance of the fair, and the line opened at the end of December 1936. Initially, the fair was planned to be served by IND stations in the neighborhoods of Kew Gardens and Jamaica, as well as the Brooklyn–Manhattan Transit Corporation (BMT) and Interborough Rapid Transit Company (IRT) at the World's Fair station.

==== Planning ====
Attractions and geographical features of Flushing Meadows–Corona Park
Attractions and geographical features of Flushing Meadows–Corona Park:
1 Citi Field
2 Etihad Park (under construction)
3 Flushing Meadows Carousel and Queens Zoo
4 Flushing Meadows Corona Park Aquatics Center
5 Flushing River and Creek
6 Meadow Lake and Hong Kong Dragon Boat Festival
7 Metropolitan Park (planned) and Shea Stadium (demolished)
8 Mets–Willets Point subway station
9 Mets–Willets Point LIRR station
10 National Tennis Center and United States Pavilion (demolished)
11 New York Hall of Science
12 New York State Pavilion and Queens Theatre
13 Queens Botanical Garden
14 Queens Museum
15 Queens Night Market
16 Terrace on the Park
17 Unisphere
18 Willow Lake
19 World's Fair subway station (demolished)

By October 1936, there were plans to construct a spur of the IND line, diverging from the Queens Boulevard Line in the south and traveling northward to Horace Harding Boulevard. According to Grover Whalen—the president of New York World's Fair 1939 Inc., which was developing the fair—the IND spur would be able to accommodate 40,000 hourly passengers, while the IRT and BMT station would serve 40,000 additional passengers an hour. That December, the BOT and the New York State Transit Commission sent a request to the New York City Board of Estimate to provide $1.2 million for a spur of the IND line to the World's Fair grounds. Of this amount, $700,000 was to be allocated to construction and $500,000 to equipment. The city government also had the option to spend another $100,000 to construct a permanent line to the fairground.

Delaney and New York Transit Commission chairman William G. Fullen recommended in January 1937 that an 8,400-foot (2,600 m) spur of the IND line, with two revenue-service tracks and an additional storage track, be built for the World's Fair. Whalen also endorsed the spur's construction. According to Whalen, without the spur, 70% of the fair's visitors would be forced to use the BMT and IRT station at the extreme north end of the fairground, and IND riders would be disadvantaged because they would have to pay an additional 10 cents to transfer to a bus. Conversely, Moses derided the line as "extravagant and unnecessary", prompting Mayor Fiorello La Guardia to convene a committee to discuss the spur's construction. Despite Moses's objections, the Board of Estimate approved $1.2 million for the World's Fair spur that March.

New York state lawmakers John J. Dunnigan and Herbert Brownell Jr. sponsored legislation in April 1937 to authorize the Board of Estimate to issue $1.2 million worth of bonds for the project. The New York State Senate passed the bill with minimal opposition, but New York State Assembly members objected to the fact that the proposed line would charge an additional 5 cents to anyone entering or leaving the World's Fair station. The Assembly ultimately passed the bill in May 1937 on the condition that no one using the station be charged more than 5 cents. Governor Herbert H. Lehman signed the Assembly bill into law at the end of that month. For legal and financial reasons, the line was called the "World's Fair Railroad" and was considered a separate entity from the IND, in part due to the state legislation. By July 1937, the estimated cost of the line had increased to $1.742 million. At the time, BOT chief engineer Jesse B. Snow anticipated that the spur would take 22 months to construct. He also estimated that the line would accommodate 13 million passengers during 1939 and 10 million passengers during 1940.

The plans for the IND World's Fair Line prompted increased interest in homes that were being built near the spur. During the line's planning stages in 1937, city officials considered making the line permanent the end of the fair. They also looked at the possibility of intermediate stations along the line to serve the local areas, comprising what is now Kew Gardens Hills and Flushing. At the time, city officials estimated that a permanent structure would cost $3.683 million if built above ground or $6.088 million if built underground. Despite pressure from Queens borough president George U. Harvey and Queens residents, the line was ultimately not made permanent. The Board of Estimate believed that such a line would not serve any useful purpose, since the site of the fairground was undeveloped. The board's members also felt that if the line were to be permanent, it should not have been built at ground level. Attractions in Flushing Meadows, such as the Citi Field baseball park and the USTA National Tennis Center, were not added until later.

==== Construction ====
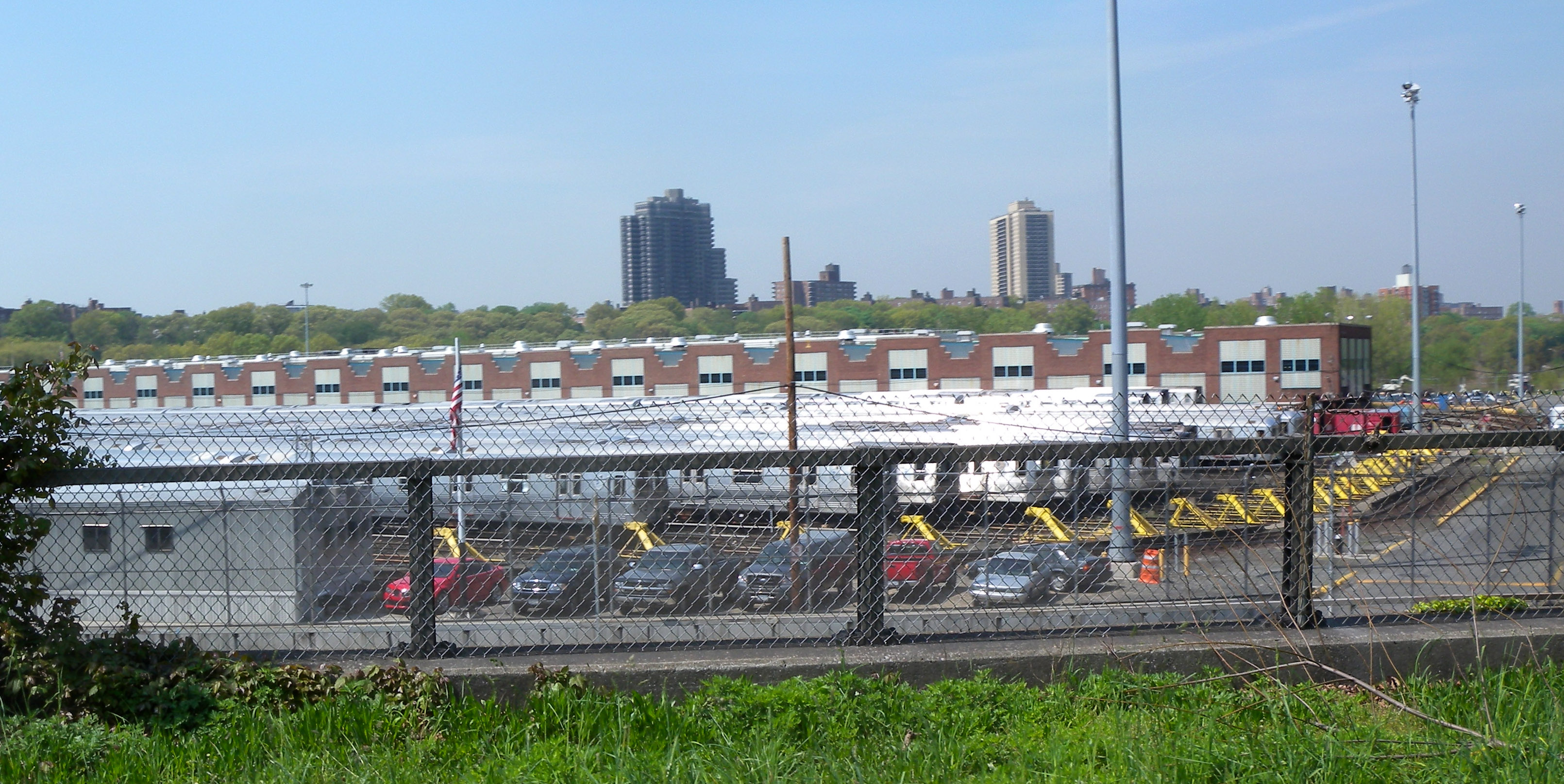
The Jamaica Yard, which connected the World's Fair and Queens Boulevard Lines

La Guardia sent an emergency message to the Board of Estimate in September 1937, requesting funding for the spur. Despite opposition from Board of Aldermen president William F. Brunner and Manhattan borough president Samuel Levy, the Board of Estimate provided $225,000 in corporate stock for the initial construction of the spur. The Board of Transportation awarded the first contract for the IND World's Fair Line on October 26, 1937, to the P. T. Cox Contracting Company. The company had been the lowest bidder for the contract, having offered to construct the trestle for the World's Fair Line at a cost of $308,770. As part of the contract, the Cox Company was to construct a pile trestle along the eastern edge of Flushing Meadows, with track beds made of rock ballast.

By February 1938, there were concerns that excessively high wages would delay the line's construction. The same month, the Board of Estimate awarded nine contracts for the construction of the line's tracks, which cost a total of $148,595. Work on the World's Fair station commenced on April 2, 1938, and six construction contracts were underway by that May. The Board of Estimate began soliciting bids for the line's signaling system that July; the contract was awarded to the Utility Electric Company, which had bid $125,577. Neither Union Switch & Signal nor General Railway Signal, which had manufactured every existing signal in the subway system, submitted any bids for the signal system, as they were protesting the city's requirement that labor unions install the signals' wiring. The line's contractors thus had to obtain parts from these two companies.

During mid-1938, the BOT considered implementing a 5-cent exit fare for passengers leaving the World's Fair station and a 10-cent entrance fare for people entering the station. Delaney predicted that the line would earn $369,000 during the fair's 1939 season and $236,700 during the 1940 season; these were based on ridership projections of 13.072 million in 1939 and 10.458 million in 1940. However, Delaney also anticipated that the line would incur a net loss of $932,570 due to the need to pay interest and amortization fees on the line's construction. The BOT awarded an $11,816 contract for 18 turnstiles to the Perry Manufacturing Company Inc. in September 1938. The turnstiles were configured to accept either nickels or dimes because the BOT had not yet decided whether to implement the increased fares. To pay for the line's construction, the Board of Estimate decided in February 1939 to charge an additional fare at the World's Fair station. By then, the line was more than 85 percent complete. The line's construction was expedited so it would be complete by April 15, 1939. Ultimately, the line cost the IND $1,187,512, though the city's parks department planned to pay back $1.7 million to the IND.

=== Operation ===
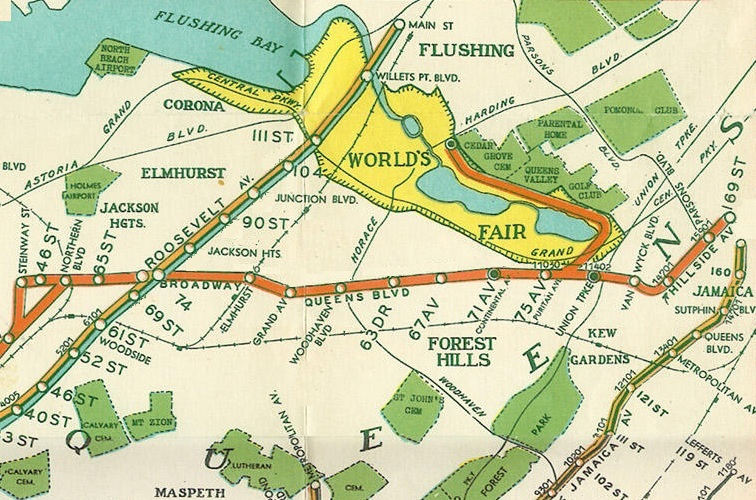
A portion of a New York City Subway map from 1939, showing the World's Fair Line as a spur heading northwest off the Queens Boulevard Line. The Queens Boulevard Line is the red line stretching roughly horizontally across the map's center.

Test trains on the IND World's Fair Line began running in mid-April, and news media reported that empty trains were to start operating on the line on April 29, when a new IND schedule went into effect. The line opened the following day, April 30, 1939. The line was mostly served by the GG local train, running between Smith–Ninth Streets and the World's Fair station. As such, IND riders had to change trains up to two times. Additional E express service ran between the World's Fair station and Hudson Terminal during afternoon rush hours and evenings. Passengers on the E or GG trains who were not going to the Fair would transfer at Continental Avenue. Service generally ran until 1:30 a.m.. When the E and GG trains both ran to the fair, trains arrived every 3–6 minutes. Trains ran every 6–12 minutes after the fair closed for the day, serving people who were still on the fairground.

The fair ran for two six-month seasons in 1939 and 1940. Of the fair's first million visitors, just over 9% (or 90,000) used the IND World's Fair Line to access the fair. By comparison, 203,000 passengers used the LIRR, and 189,000 passengers used the BMT and IRT line. Reflecting the IND line's temporary nature, it had to be repaired and reinforced every time there was a severe rainstorm. Initially, the line carried more passengers away from the fair than toward it. This trend continued throughout the rest of the 1939 season, since the station was next to the fairground's amusement area, where fairground visitors tended to congregate at the end of the day. The line ultimately carried 7,067,948 riders in 1939, far below the city's original estimate of 13 million. The ridership figures included 2.9 million passengers traveling to the fair and 4.2 million passengers leaving the fair. The most popular month for the line was May, when the line carried 1.2 million total passengers. Service for the first season ended on November 1, 1939.

The IND World's Fair Line was closed between seasons, and police officers patrolled the area outside the station during the off-season. The subway station reopened on May 11, 1940, when the second season of the World's Fair commenced. That June, Harvey proposed retaining the line after the fair, and he formed a committee to advocate for its continued operation. Harvey also proposed extending the line, which was supported by the local communities, elected officials in Queens, and the president of Queens College. Even as there were plans to redevelop the fairground as a city park, the BOT said the World's Fair Line would still be closed and demolished at the end of the fair. The last train ran on October 28, 1940, at 5 a.m., the day after the fair closed.

=== Demolition ===
Plans called for the IND station and the connecting ramp to be demolished after the fair ended. While most of the fairgrounds were torn down soon after the event, the line remained intact for several months afterward. The BOT deemed it infeasible to retain the World's Fair Line because the trestle was constructed to be temporary, and due to regulations at the time which required permanent lines for subway service to be built underground. The BOT also said it would be "an improvident waste of public funds" to continue to operate the line.

Parks and highway commissioner Robert Moses, meanwhile, wished to utilize the right-of-way for the further development of Flushing Meadows Park and the extension of the 135th Street. The Board of Estimate authorized the demolition of the line in December 1940, and on January 15, 1941, removal of the line commenced. The right-of-way was replaced with an extension of 136th Street, and eventually the northern portion of the Van Wyck Expressway which formed today's Interstate 678. Seven train signals that were modified for the World's Fair Line still exist along the Jamaica Yard's track connections to the Queens Boulevard Line. Instead of controlling the speeds of passenger trains, these signals are now used to control the speeds of yard traffic.

Preparation for the 1964 World's Fair started in 1960. An extension of the IND Queens Boulevard Line to the fair grounds was considered. Moses, who was also in charge of the corporation that operated the 1964 fair, rejected the proposal once he found out that the line would have cost $10 million. In the end, improved Flushing Line service, and increased E, F, and GG service on the Queens Boulevard Line would provide improved transportation facilities for the fair.

== Route ==
World's Fair
- Former New York City Subway station
- A subway train at the station

Station statistics
- Borough: Queens
- Locale: Flushing Meadows
- Coordinates: 40.742753°N 73.837762°W
- Division
- Line: IND Queens Boulevard/World's Fair Line
- Services: None (demolished)
- Structure: At-grade
- Platforms: 1 island platform 2 side platforms Spanish solution
- Tracks: 2

Other information
- Opened: April 30, 1939
- Closed: October 28, 1940
- Former/other names: Horace Harding Boulevard

Station succession
- Next north: (Terminal)
- Next south: Forest Hills–71st Avenue
Location
Location within New York City Subway
Location within New York City
Location within New York
Street map
Station service legend
Symbol	Description
Stops all times	Stops in station at all times
Stops all times except late nights	Stops all times except late nights
Stops late nights only	Stops late nights only
Stops late nights and weekends	Stops late nights and weekends only
Stops weekdays during the day	Stops weekdays during the day
Stops weekends during the day	Stops weekends during the day
Stops all times except rush hours in the peak direction	Stops all times except rush hours in the peak direction
Stops all times except weekdays in the peak direction	Stops all times except weekdays in the peak direction
Stops daily except rush hours in the peak direction	Stops all times except nights and rush hours in the peak direction
Stops rush hours only	Stops rush hours only
Stops rush hours in the peak direction only	Stops rush hours in the peak direction only
Station closed	Station is closed
(Details about time periods)

The line originated at the Queens Boulevard portal of Jamaica Yard as a continuation of the tracks that diverged from the Queens Boulevard Line east of 71st−Continental Avenues. The line ran along the eastern edge of Flushing Meadows–Corona Park for 1.83 miles (2.95 km) to approximately what is now the interchange of the Long Island Expressway and the Van Wyck Expressway. The line consisted of two tracks ending in a stub-end terminal, the World's Fair station. The marshy swampland in the line's right-of-way was filled in, and a trestle was built over the landfill. The line was designed to be removed following the fair in 1940. The World's Fair Railroad and station are the only IND line and station to have been closed and demolished.

=== Station ===
The World's Fair station was the line's northern terminus (Note: Geographically, trains running southeast on the Queens Boulevard Line would then turn northward along the World's Fair Line. In terms of railroad directions, however, the trains would be traveling "railroad north" for the entire duration of their trip.) and its sole station. The stop was alternately named the Horace Harding Boulevard station, after the avenue where it was located. It was open only from April 30, 1939, to October 28, 1940, and no service operated there in the off-season between 1939 and 1940. The station was located in the Amusement Area of the World's Fair, next to the Flushing River. The closest attractions to the station were the New York State Amphitheater (also known as the Aquacade) and the World's Fair Music Hall. Conversely, it was about 1 mile (1.6 km) away from the foreign nations' exhibits at the northern end of the fairground. During the 1940 season, the Parachute Jump attraction was relocated so that it was also near the subway station.

The World's Fair Corporation allocated a 25,000-square-foot (2,300 m^{2}) site for the station's construction. The station was a three-story wood, steel, and concrete structure. One level was used as a bus terminal, while the other two stories were used as the subway station. Three ramps, each measuring 132 feet (40 m) long and 17.6 to 32 feet (5.4 to 9.8 m) wide, connected the platforms with the upper levels. A New York Herald Tribune article likened the IND station to "a modernistic suburban railway station". Before the beginning of the 1940 season, thirty lights were installed on the ramp leading to the World's Fair station. Each lamp consisted of a pair of 12-foot-wide (3.7 m) "wheels" atop a 20-foot-tall (6.1 m) pole.

The station itself was a stub-end terminal with two tracks and three platforms, organized in a Spanish solution. A third siding was built south of the station. The platforms and tracks were built atop 317 wooden pilings, or stilt foundations. Each of the pilings measured 75 to 90 feet (23 to 27 m) long and 6 to 12 inches (150 to 300 mm) across and were installed using pneumatic hammers. Due to the expense of removing the pilings, workers decided to leave the foundations in place after the fair.

For passengers entering the station, an additional 5-cent fare was charged on top of the standard nickel fare. Eighteen special turnstiles were used at the World's Fair station that permitted traffic flow in both directions and accepted two different fares depending on the direction of travel. Fairgoers disembarking from trains paid a nickel as they exited through the turnstiles while passengers entering the station from the fairgrounds paid a ten-cent fare upon passing through the turnstiles. The double fare was instituted to avoid a financial deficit. Discounts were offered to certain groups of passengers; for example, students were allowed to pay for a 5-cent round trip ticket at the end of the 1939 season, and low-income adults were also permitted to pay 5 cents at the end of the 1940 season. A double fare was later implemented on stations of the IND Rockaway Line, which opened in 1956 and used this fare system until 1975.

== Competing service ==
The IRT and BMT also served the World's Fair, but did so directly with World's Fair (now Mets–Willets Point) station on the dual-operated Flushing Line, which was rebuilt into an express station for the Fair. A Long Island Rail Road station, the current Mets–Willets Point station, was built next to the Flushing Line station. Unlike the IND line, the IRT and BMT charged a standard 5-cent fare. The LIRR station charged a 24-cent fare for trips to or from Pennsylvania Station.
