= Queens Night Market =

Annual summertime event in New York City

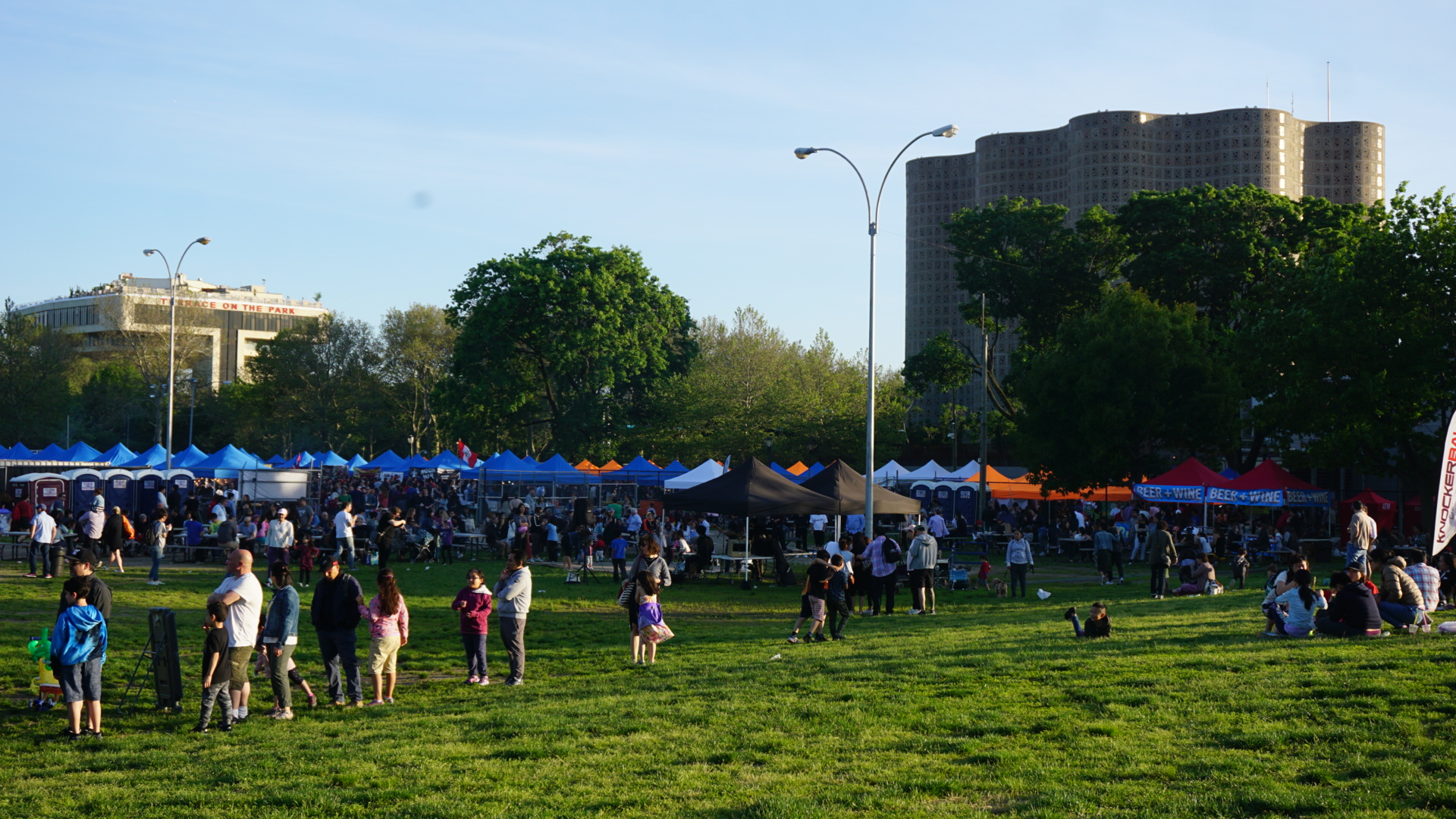
- Queens Night Market in May 2019
- Status: Active
- Begins: April
- Ends: October
- Frequency: Annually
- Venue: Flushing Meadows-Corona Park
- Locations: Queens, New York, U.S.
- Coordinates: 40°44′53″N 73°51′2″W
- Inaugurated: 2015
- Attendance: 20,000 nightly (2023)
- Website: Official website

Attractions and geographical features of Flushing Meadows–Corona Park
Attractions and geographical features of Flushing Meadows–Corona Park:
1 Citi Field
2 Etihad Park (under construction)
3 Flushing Meadows Carousel and Queens Zoo
4 Flushing Meadows Corona Park Aquatics Center
5 Flushing River and Creek
6 Meadow Lake and Hong Kong Dragon Boat Festival
7 Metropolitan Park (planned) and Shea Stadium (demolished)
8 Mets–Willets Point subway station
9 Mets–Willets Point LIRR station
10 National Tennis Center and United States Pavilion (demolished)
11 New York Hall of Science
12 New York State Pavilion and Queens Theatre
13 Queens Botanical Garden
14 Queens Museum
15 Queens Night Market
16 Terrace on the Park
17 Unisphere
18 Willow Lake
19 World's Fair subway station (demolished)

The Queens Night Market, also known as the Queens International Night Market, is a night market in Queens in New York City, New York. The event launched in Flushing Meadows-Corona Park in April 2015, with 40 vendors. Since then, it operates on Saturday nights from April through October, except for a break when the US Open tennis tournament is held within the park. As of 2023, the event averages around 20,000 visitors on Saturday nights.

The market was named the #9 best restaurant in New York City by The New York Times in 2023.

The market hosts independent vendors each night, selling food, art, and merchandise; as of 2019, it has featured food from over 80 countries. When it launched in 2015, it introduced a $5 price cap on all food available for sale at the event. The price cap has since been raised to $6.

A cookbook with vendor stories and recipes, The World Eats Here: Amazing Food and the Inspiring People Who Make It at New York's Queens Night Market by John Wang and Storm Garner, was published in 2020.

The event has ATMs, sells beer and wine, and hosts live entertainment each Saturday night. To date, the event has hosted approximately 200 free live performances.

The event was paused during the COVID-19 pandemic in New York City in 2020. It reopened with ticketed entry under public health regulations in June 2021 and resumed regular operations in July 2021.
