= Metropolitan Park (Queens) =

Under construction park and entertainment complex in Queens, New York

- Interactive map of Metropolitan Park
- Location: Flushing Meadows–Corona Park; Flushing, Queens, New York, United States
- Coordinates: 40°45′20″N 73°50′53″W
- Groundbreaking: January 2026 (planned)
- Opening: June 2030 (planned)
- Use: Mixed-use development
- Website: www.metropolitanpark.com

Companies
- Owner: Queens Future, LLC

Technical details
- Leasable area: 50 acres (0.20 km^{2})
- Proposed: November 7, 2023

Hard Rock Hotel & Casino Metropolitan Park
- Opened: TBD
- No. of rooms: 2,300
- Casino type: Resort
- Operating license holder: Hard Rock International
- Website: Metropolitan Park; Hard Rock Hotel & Casino Metropolitan Park

Metropolitan Park is a casino, park and entertainment complex currently under construction in the New York City borough of Queens. The site is located at the northern end of Flushing Meadows–Corona Park in the parking lots adjacent to Citi Field, the home of the New York Mets of Major League Baseball (MLB). The project is being undertaken by Queens Future, LLC, a joint venture between Mets owner Steve Cohen and Hard Rock Entertainment.

== History ==
=== Initial plans ===
Attractions and geographical features of Flushing Meadows–Corona Park
Attractions and geographical features of Flushing Meadows–Corona Park:
1 Citi Field
2 Etihad Park (under construction)
3 Flushing Meadows Carousel and Queens Zoo
4 Flushing Meadows Corona Park Aquatics Center
5 Flushing River and Creek
6 Meadow Lake and Hong Kong Dragon Boat Festival
7 Metropolitan Park (planned) and Shea Stadium (demolished)
8 Mets–Willets Point subway station
9 Mets–Willets Point LIRR station
10 National Tennis Center and United States Pavilion (demolished)
11 New York Hall of Science
12 New York State Pavilion and Queens Theatre
13 Queens Botanical Garden
14 Queens Museum
15 Queens Night Market
16 Terrace on the Park
17 Unisphere
18 Willow Lake
19 World's Fair subway station (demolished)

In October 2013, the New York City Council approved a plan to build a mall and entertainment center called Willets West in the Citi Field parking lot where Shea Stadium stood, as part of an effort by the city to redevelop the nearby neighborhood of Willets Point. However, in 2015, the Appellate Division of the New York Supreme Court ruled that the site, considered parkland, could not be used for commercial development without permission from the New York state government.

New York state officials announced in April 2022 that they would issue three casino licenses in Downstate New York. Following this announcement, in 2022, Mets owner Steve Cohen began pushing to build a casino in the parking lot, which was supported by New York City mayor Eric Adams, but still needed final approval from the New York state government. In November 2023, Cohen unveiled a proposal to build an $8 billion, 50-acre casino and entertainment complex in the parking lot, called Metropolitan Park, which would include a Hard Rock Hotel and Casino. The hotel would become the largest hotel in New York City and amongst the largest hotels in the world if built. The complex would also include cultural amenities, convention space, a music venue, restaurants, shopping, an indoor pool and a new park.

=== Casino licensing process ===
==== Opposition and approval of casino license ====
New York state senator Jessica Ramos, who represents New York's 13th State Senate district where the site is located, announced her intention to formally oppose the construction of the casino and entertainment complex in May 2024. In February 2025, the City Planning Commission voted in favor of approving zoning changes which would allow for the project to be built. The area is zoned as parkland and zoning changes are needed to allow the project to move forward. Neighboring community boards have also voted in favor of the proposed development. In March 2025, the City Council voted 41–2 to approve the zoning changes.

State senator John Liu, who represents the neighboring 16th State Senate district, announced in late March that he would introduce a bill to reclassify the zoning of the parking lot next to Citi Field as commercial space, which if passed would allow the integrated resort to be built. In late April 2025, a State Senate committee voted 4-3 to advance a bill allowing the Willets Point section of the park to be rezoned to permit commercial use. In May 2025, the bill passed in the New York State Assembly 138–7 and then passed in the State Senate 54–5. The senate bill reclassified the site as commercial property, clearing the way for casino construction to begin. Liu was criticized for his support of the plan, due to concerns over parkland alienation and that the casino will target the local older Asian community members in surrounding neighborhoods that are vulnerable to developing gambling addictions.

The construction of the Hard Rock complex and its neighboring public park, food hall, and other improvements hinged on the project winning one of the three downstate casino licenses from the New York State Gaming Commission. On September 30, 2025, a community advisory committee unanimously approved the proposal, sending it back to the Gaming Commission for final licensure. On November 16, 2025, local community groups held a protest in Downtown Flushing against Metropolitan Park and supportive elected officials State Senator Liu and Governor Kathy Hochul, with close to one thousand in attendance. On December 1, 2025, the state's Gaming Facility Location Board recommended that a casino license be awarded for the Metropolitan Park proposal, an action which needed to be ratified by the Gaming Commission by the end of the year before formal approval could be issued. On December 12, 2025, thirty faith leaders representing over 10,000 congregants released statements against Metropolitan Park and the promotion of gambling. The final approval for the site was given by the Gaming Commission on December 15, 2025, at which point the casino was scheduled to open in 2030.

==== Further delays ====
Despite the approval, Queens residents have continued to oppose the project, saying that building a commercial development on a floodplain would increase flooding risks for neighborhoods surrounding the area. Opponents also cited concerns that the casino would increase rents and would, in particular, leave Asian residents vulnerable to gambling addictions. On March 20, 2026, Queens residents filed a lawsuit with the New York Supreme Court against the New York State Gaming Commission in an attempt to prevent the construction of the Metropolitan Park casino. The lawsuit was initially dismissed by Judge Nicholas W. Moyne, who later recused himself after petitioners refiled their lawsuit, citing a "tangential social relationship with a member of respondent." The case remains active.

In July 2026, a new poll found that 61% of likely Democratic voters in New York’s sixth congressional district oppose the project, compared with 20% who support it. The same poll found that 73% of likely Democratic Asian voters and 79% in Assembly District 40 oppose the project. Construction has experienced significant delays, with the project running months behind schedule. In October 2026, newest renderings of the casino designs were released to overwhelmingly negative reception, with opponents dominating public hearings, and the New York City Public Design Commission delayed a vote on the plans due to a number of concerns including the project's potential negative impact on the local environment. Shortly after, reports surfaced that former NYC Parks Commissioner Sue Donoghue warned about Metropolitan Park back in November 2024, stating the public park "lacks fundamental qualities that would make it a true asset to the local community."

== See also ==
- Etihad Park, an adjacent soccer stadium in Willets Point
- Ballpark Village (St. Louis) - a similar mixed-use development adjacent to Busch Stadium, home of the St. Louis Cardinals
- The Battery Atlanta - a similar mixed-use development adjacent to Truist Park, home of the Atlanta Braves
- Hellinikon Metropolitan Park - a similar park which will feature a Hard Rock themed casino-hotel
