= The Third Rail (magazine) =

The Third Rail is a U.S.-based online magazine concerning itself with rapid transit topics, including history and current events. It is currently published by The Composing Stack Inc. of New York City, a software and internet services company, and the title is a registered trademark of that company.

== History ==
The Third Rail published a single issue as a print magazine dated Summer, 1966 and then published six issues from 1974 to 1976.

In May 1999 The Third Rail was revived as an online magazine. As of April 2007, fifteen online editions have been posted. Publication has been sporadic but all editions are online in 2022. Some of the magazines contain original articles, some contain reprints from the print publication. Rapidtransit.net, which includes The Third Rail was featured in the New York Online column of The New York Times for January 9, 2000.
