= Third Rail (MLS supporters association) =

Independent supporters' group for New York City FC

The Third Rail
- Founded: May 21, 2013; 13 years ago
- Type: Supporters' group
- Team: New York City FC
- Location: New York City
- Stadiums: Yankee Stadium
- Stand: 236 and 237
- Membership: 1,600 paid (as of February 2015)
- Website: www.thirdrail.nyc

The Third Rail is an independent supporters group for New York City FC of Major League Soccer. It was founded on May 21, 2013, the same day as the expansion club was announced. The name of the club references the third rail, which provides power to the New York City Subway.

== History ==
The group began as a loose online association of supporters before organizing its first public meeting in February 2014. It soon began organizing regular meetings, pub crawls and other events including viewing parties for the 2014 FIFA World Cup.

== Name and logo ==
The group's name was chosen by a public vote of supporters on May 21, 2014. It refers to the third rail, which powers New York City's subway system.

The Third Rail logo was designed by graphic artist Matthew Wolff. It features a raised Art Deco fist holding three lightning bolts, and uses the same typeface and color scheme as New York City FC's logo. When the logo was introduced, New York City FC announced that the MLS club was "powered by the Third Rail".

== Supporters section ==
Members of the Third Rail are eligible to purchase New York City FC season tickets in the group's exclusive area, Sections 236 and 237 of Yankee Stadium and Sections 101-106 of Citi Field.
