= Kissena =

Kissena refers to several locations in the borough of Queens, New York City, U.S.:

- Kissena Boulevard
- Kissena Creek
- Kissena Park
