= College Point Fields =

Public park in Queens, New York

Coordinates: 40.777768°N 73.838343°W

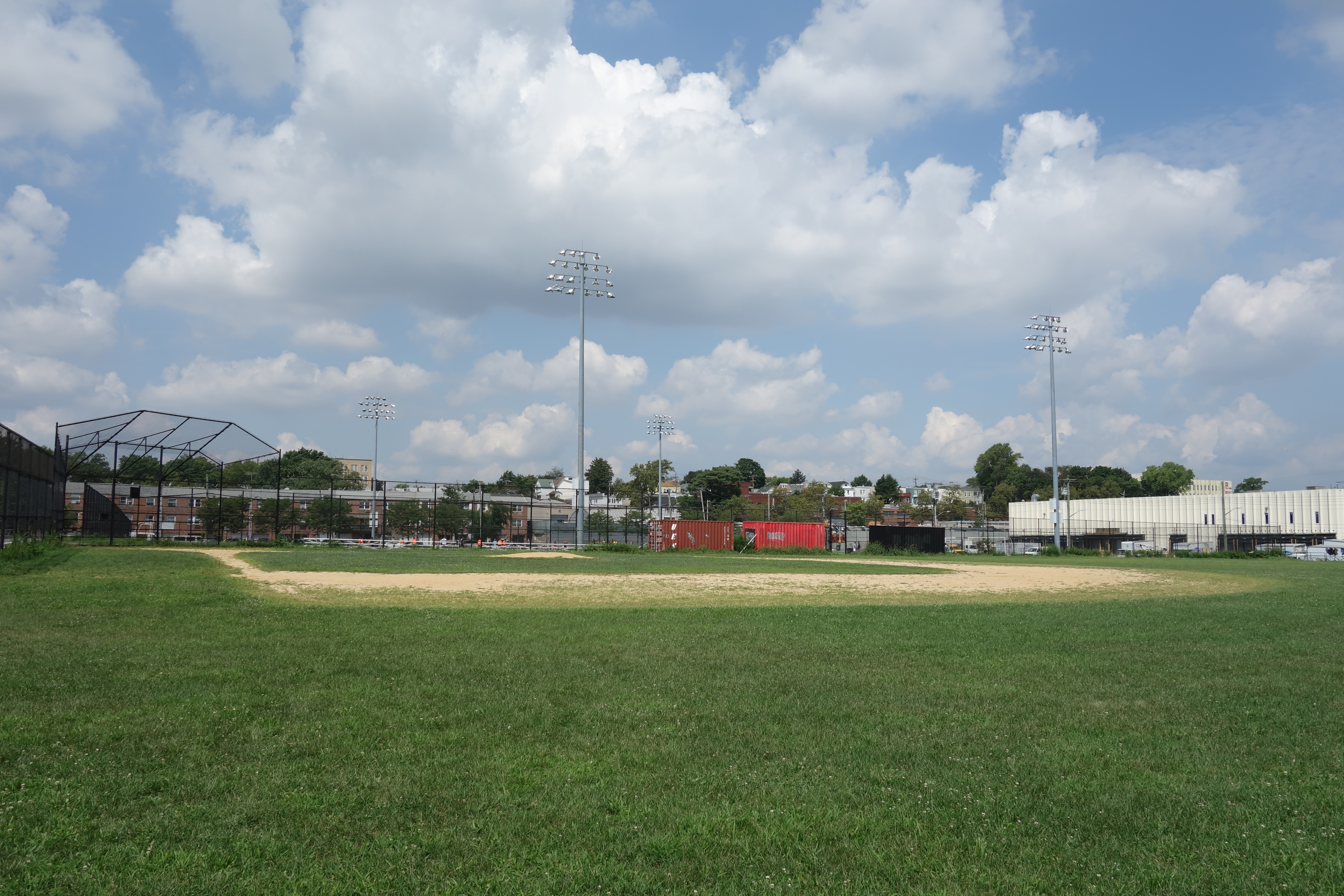
Field 4 (Jimmy Sandorf Field) of the College Point Fields in 2019.

College Point Fields is a public park in College Point, Queens, New York City. It is bounded by Ulmer and 130th Streets to the west, 23rd Avenue to the north, Linden Place to the east, and 26th Avenue and the remains of Mill Creek to the south. The park contains two fields each for Little League Baseball and regular baseball; a soccer field; a roller hockey rink; and bleachers.

College Point Fields is named after the College Point neighborhood, which in turn was named after St. Paul’s College, which operated between 1838 and 1850. To the east of the fields is the abandoned Flushing Airport, which operated from 1927 to 1984. South of the airport was the College Point Corporate Park, which opened in 1960. The northwestern corner of the corporate park was leased to the College Point Sports Complex. The fields were closed in 1997 due to illegal dumping of waste on the site. Several individuals associated with the contractor who performed the dumping, Enviro-Fill, were later charged with criminal mischief for the dumping.

The New York City Parks Department took over the site in 1996. Eight years later, on April 17, 2004, the Little League fields were reopened. Field 4 was renovated in 2016. Several other fields were renovated starting in 2017 and were originally supposed to reopen in January 2018, but was delayed to November 2018.
