= Underbridge Dog Run =

Dog run in Queens, New York

Coordinates: 40.733823°N 73.845134°W

Underbridge Dog Run is a dog run named after the pedestrian bridge connecting it to the adjacent Flushing Meadows–Corona Park, the fourth-largest city-operated park in New York City and site of the 1939–40 and 1964–65 World's Fairs. The park is located on Grand Central Parkway between 64th Avenue and 64th Road. The section of the park located opposite the Underbridge Dog Run contains Meadow Lake, the largest lake within New York City.

The city purchased this property, located at the base of a pedestrian footbridge that passes over Grand Central Parkway in 1938 as part of Flushing Meadows Park. It was designated as a separate park in 1980. Through its history, the park was known simply as "West Meadow Playground, although a playground was never built in this park. in recognition of its use as a public dog run, it was renamed Underbridge Dog Run.
