= Flushing River =

Creek in Queens, New York

Flushing River Flushing Creek
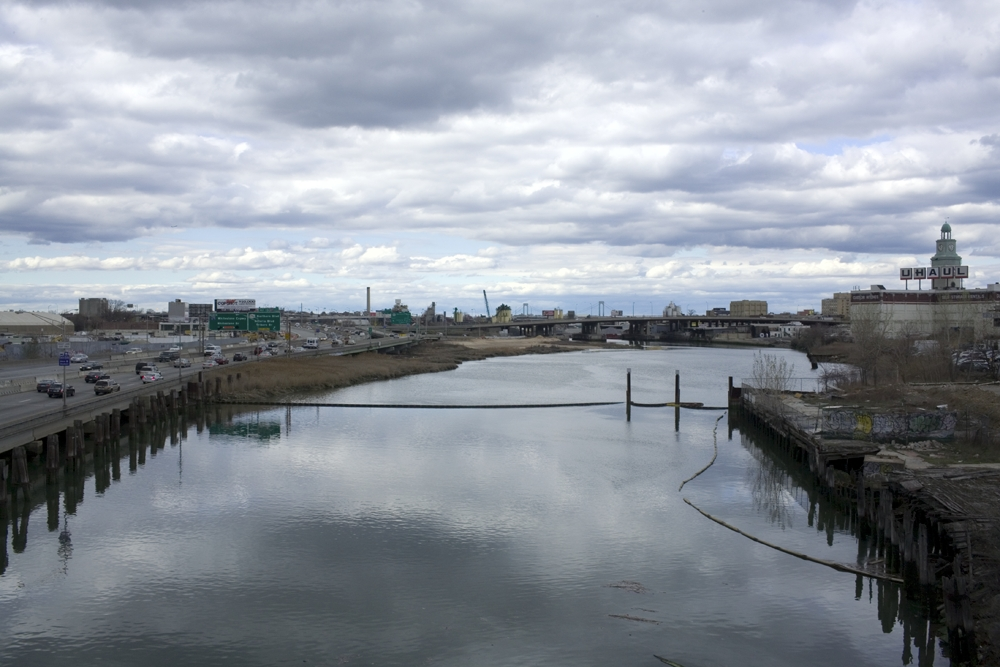
- The river as seen from Northern Boulevard, looking north

- Location within New York City Location within New York
- Etymology: Flushing, Queens (from Vlissingen, Netherlands)

Location
- Country: United States
- State: New York
- City: New York City
- County/Borough: Queens

Physical characteristics
- Source: Jamaica Yard
  - coordinates: 40.718333°N 73.831111°W
- Mouth: Flushing Bay
  - coordinates: 40.765115°N 73.843364°W
- Length: 2 miles (3.2 km)

Basin features
- Tributaries
  - left: Horse Brook
  - right: Kissena Creek, Mill Creek
- Waterbodies: Meadow Lake, Willow Lake
- Bridges: 7

The Flushing River, also known as Flushing Creek, is a waterway that flows northward through the borough of Queens in New York City, New York, U.S. It runs mostly within Flushing Meadows–Corona Park, emptying into the Flushing Bay and the East River. The river runs through a valley that may have been a larger riverbed before the last Ice Age, and it divides Queens into western and eastern halves. Until the 20th century, the Flushing Creek was fed by three tributaries: Mill Creek and Kissena Creek on the eastern bank, and Horse Brook on the western bank.

In the 18th and 19th centuries, it divided the towns of Flushing on its right bank, to the east, and Newtown (now part of Corona) on its left bank, to the west. Several bridges were built across the Flushing River in the 19th and 20th centuries. Prior to the 1939 New York World's Fair, the southern portion of the river was expanded into the Meadow and Willow Lakes. A part of the Flushing River was buried prior to the 1964 New York World's Fair. Following accumulations of pollution in the 20th century, cleanup of the Flushing River started in the 1970s, though some portions of the river have yet to be restored.

The modern-day river is 4 miles (6.4 km) long, originating near the Jamaica Yard in Kew Gardens Hills. The river flows through Willow and Meadow Lakes before entering a tunnel north of the Long Island Expressway. The Flushing River runs for 2,000 feet (610 m) underground before resurfacing at the Tidal Gate Bridge at the northern end of Flushing Meadows–Corona Park. The rest of the river separates the industrial portions of the Willets Point and Flushing neighborhoods before emptying into the Flushing Bay.

== Course ==
Attractions and geographical features of Flushing Meadows–Corona Park
Attractions and geographical features of Flushing Meadows–Corona Park:
1 Citi Field
2 Etihad Park (under construction)
3 Flushing Meadows Carousel and Queens Zoo
4 Flushing Meadows Corona Park Aquatics Center
5 Flushing River and Creek
6 Meadow Lake and Hong Kong Dragon Boat Festival
7 Metropolitan Park (planned) and Shea Stadium (demolished)
8 Mets–Willets Point subway station
9 Mets–Willets Point LIRR station
10 National Tennis Center and United States Pavilion (demolished)
11 New York Hall of Science
12 New York State Pavilion and Queens Theatre
13 Queens Botanical Garden
14 Queens Museum
15 Queens Night Market
16 Terrace on the Park
17 Unisphere
18 Willow Lake
19 World's Fair subway station (demolished)

The 4-mile-long (6.4 km) Flushing Creek once rose in the present-day neighborhood of Kew Gardens Hills, where Vleigh Place (old Dutch for Valley) traces the valley of the headwaters. The river's original source is now occupied by the Kew Gardens Interchange, while the reconstructed source is located near Jamaica Yard, emptying from a pipe there. The headwaters, fed by groundwater, empty north into Willow Lake and then Meadow Lake, two artificial freshwater lakes, which are respectively 40 and 100 acres (16 and 40 ha) and comprise the southern half of present-day Flushing Meadows–Corona Park. Prior to the lakes' construction, the creek meandered through tidal marshes in the larger valley within the present-day park; its mouth was at Flushing Bay, a 6,200-acre (2,500 ha) water body on the East River. The two lakes are connected via a narrow channel under Jewel Avenue.

After following a channel north from Meadow Lake, the Flushing River runs for about 2,500 feet (760 m) underneath the ramps between the Van Wyck Expressway (Interstate 678) and Long Island Expressway (Interstate 495). The river then feeds into the Pool of Industry and Fountain of the Planets, built during the 1964 New York World's Fair, running for about 2,000 feet (610 m) under the fountains. Afterward, the Flushing River re-emerges from the ground, where it partially divides a 19-acre (7.7 ha) plot of land occupied by the park's pitch and putt golf course. It then flows underneath the Tide Gate Bridge, where the fresh water river mixes with the saltwater from Flushing Bay. The channel widens, running between Willets Point to the west and Flushing to the east, finally emptying into Flushing Bay. The northernmost portion of the creek mostly contains bulkheads on the shoreline, with industrial uses on the eastern bank and marshes on the western bank. The total distance between Meadow Lake's outlet and the river's mouth is about 7,000 feet (2,100 m).

The watershed of the Flushing River is primarily residential, though there are also significant recreational and open spaces, with industrial usages near the mouth of the river. Even though the Flushing River now largely follows an artificial route, the river still regularly overflows into surrounding areas, especially during heavy rain. Meadow Lake, which also overflows during rains, collects sewage from several surrounding neighborhoods. The raw sewage collected in the Flushing River has contributed to the heavy pollution in Flushing Bay.

=== Tributaries ===
Kissena Creek, known historically as Ireland Mill Creek, is a right-bank tributary of the Flushing River, which begins in what is now Pomonok/Kew Gardens Hills. The creek is now largely buried, running through Kissena Park, Kissena Corridor Park, and Queens Botanical Garden. It empties into the Flushing Bay Combined Sewer Outfall Retention Facility, which lies on the right bank of the Flushing River, below the Al Oerter Recreation Center. The facility, completed in 2007, can hold up to 43.4 million US gallons (164,000,000 L) of water from combined sewer overflows during storms, before pumping the water to the Tallman Island Waste Water Treatment Plant in College Point.

Mill Creek is a right-bank tributary of the Flushing River that empties into the river just east of Flushing Bay. Mill Creek was fed by two branches. The southern branch, which has been infilled, originated at Town Pond at the modern-day intersection of Northern Boulevard and Main Street, which was filled in 1843; the creek then flowed north. The northern branch, which still exists in truncated form, originated at the site of the George U. Harvey Playground, near the intersection of 20th Avenue and the Whitestone Expressway in Whitestone, and flowed south through the present sites of College Point Fields, Flushing Airport, and College Point Corporate Park. The two branches merged at Linden Place and 28th Avenue. Following development of the surrounding area, the northern branch begins in the wetlands around Flushing Airport and runs through the former airport site. Several underground pipes, as well as man-made drainage ditches on the New York City Police Academy campus and north of 28th Avenue, carry the creek from the airport to the Flushing River. College Point was a peninsula until the mid-20th century, separated from the rest of Queens by Mill Creek's northern branch.

Horse Brook is a left-bank tributary of the Flushing River, which begins to the west in Elmhurst. The creek then ran close to the path of what is now the Long Island Expressway. Horse Brook was gradually covered in phases through the 20th century. It is now entirely buried, but its path can be traced by the existence of large superblocks, such as those that contain Queens Center Mall, Rego Center's extension, Newtown High School's athletic field, and LeFrak City.

=== Bridges ===
The Jewel Avenue crossing, the southernmost crossing of the Flushing River, was built prior to the 1939 World's Fair. It was rebuilt and expanded in 1961 to also pass over the Van Wyck Expressway.

The present-day Long Island Expressway crosses the river to the north, slightly east of the site of Strong's Causeway. The causeway may have been first built in 1801, but definitely dates to at least the 1850s. This crossing, located near the confluence of Horse Brook and Flushing Creek, extended Corona Avenue on its zigzag route toward Flushing. For most of the 19th century it was a narrow bridge, 18 feet (5.5 m) wide. By the 1890s, there were plans to replace Strong's Causeway because it sank every year, though taxpayers protested against the proposal. In February 1896, the causeway collapsed into the Flushing Creek. A new bridge opened at the site on September 2 of that year. The causeway was replaced in 1937 by a bridge carrying the then-newly built Horace Harding Boulevard, and was rebuilt into the present Long Island Expressway in the late 1950s.

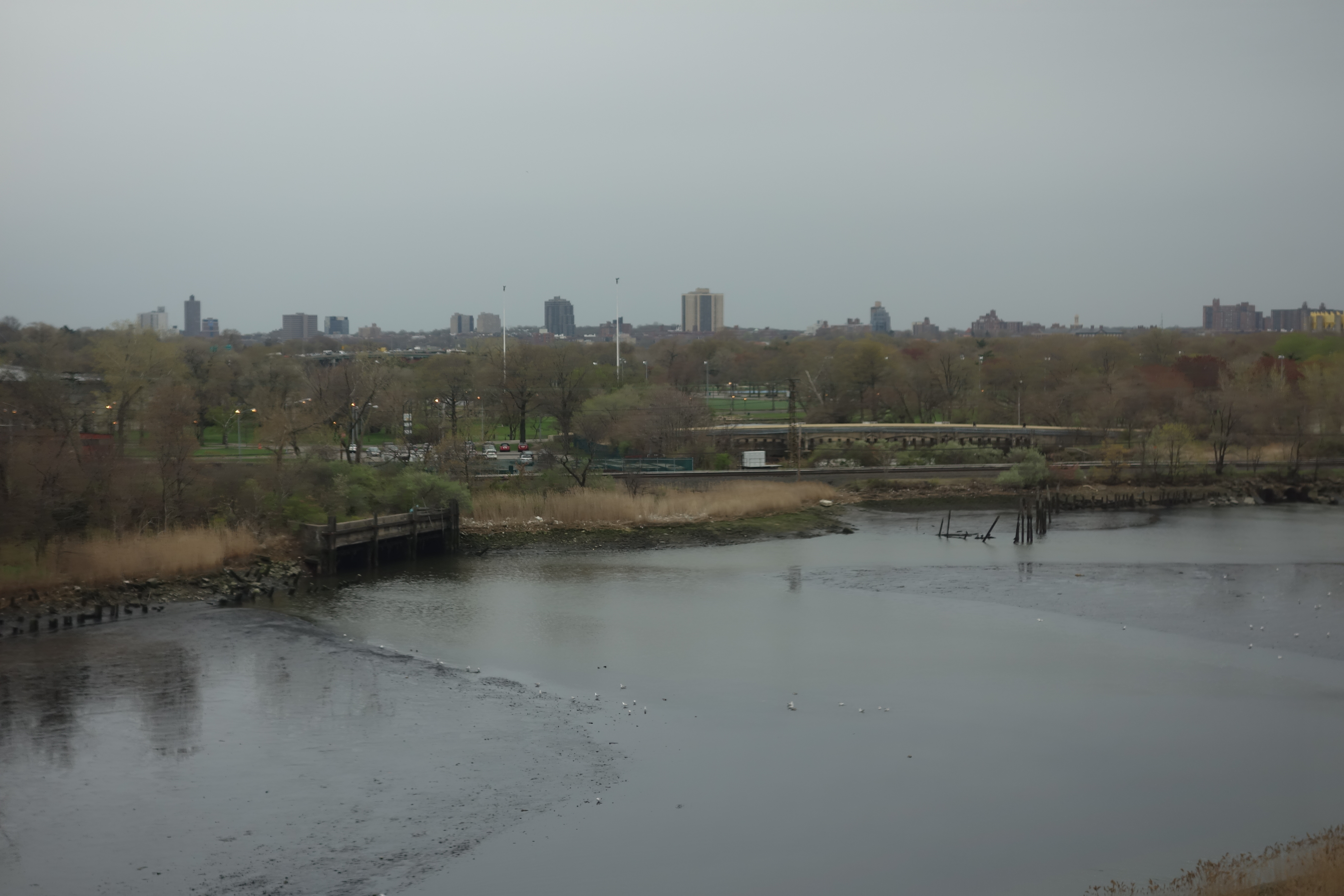
Looking south from Roosevelt Avenue; the LIRR embankment and Porpoise Bridge can be seen in the background.

Meadow and Willow Lakes and the freshwater section of the Flushing River are separated from Flushing Bay by a flood gate or dam called the "Porpoise Bridge" or "Tide Gate Bridge", located just south of the Long Island Rail Road's Port Washington Branch trestle, at the north end of the Flushing Meadows Golf Center. The dam only permits northward flows toward Flushing Bay to pass, while blocking south-flowing waters. As its name implies, the dam also acts as a bridge, carrying pedestrian and vehicular traffic over the creek. It measures 37 feet (11 m) wide and 370 feet (110 m) long. In 2024, the New York City government began replacing the bridge for $41 million.

The LIRR trestle, located directly to the north of Tide Gate Bridge, contains a small opening for water to pass through. It was built in the late 1930s and early 1940s as an embankment.

Slightly downstream, to the north, the Roosevelt Avenue bridge is a double-deck viaduct completed in 1927. It was originally built as a drawbridge, and was the world's largest fixed-trunnion bascule bridge at its completion, though it is no longer functional. The bridge carries Roosevelt Avenue, as well as the New York City Subway's IRT Flushing Line (7 and <7> trains), which were extended to Flushing–Main Street in 1928, a year after the bridge's completion. This bridge was built with the expectation that Flushing River might be converted into a navigable stream in the future. With the 1939 New York World's Fair, the creek was dammed to the south, and the Roosevelt Avenue bridge ceased to be a usable drawbridge. When the Van Wyck Expressway was being built in the early 1960s, it went directly under the Roosevelt Avenue bridge.

The LIRR's former Whitestone Branch was carried by a single-tracked wooden trestle north of the Roosevelt Avenue bridge, which contained a small drawbridge span. When the branch was abandoned in 1932, the trestle was torn down.

The Northern Boulevard crossing, also called the "Flushing Bridge", is located north of the Roosevelt Avenue bridge and the former Whitestone Branch trestle. Several bridges have existed at the site, the first of which was built c. 1800–1801, making it the oldest crossing of the Flushing River. Five additional drawbridges were built at this location. A replacement drawbridge was erected in the mid-19th century, followed by swing bridges in 1866 and 1890, an elaborate bascule bridge in 1906, and a simpler bascule bridge in 1939. It was replaced by the current viaduct structure in 1980.

The northernmost crossing of the Flushing River is that of the Whitestone Expressway. A drawbridge opened in 1939 along what was then known as the Whitestone Parkway. In December 1957, the New York state government approved a $9.5 million project to widen part of Whitestone Parkway from Northern Boulevard to the Bronx-Whitestone Bridge, including constructing a new Flushing River bridge. The new bridge opened in 1963 and included a modernization of the existing draw span. The current fixed span was built in 2008.

== Ecology ==
=== Saltwater section ===
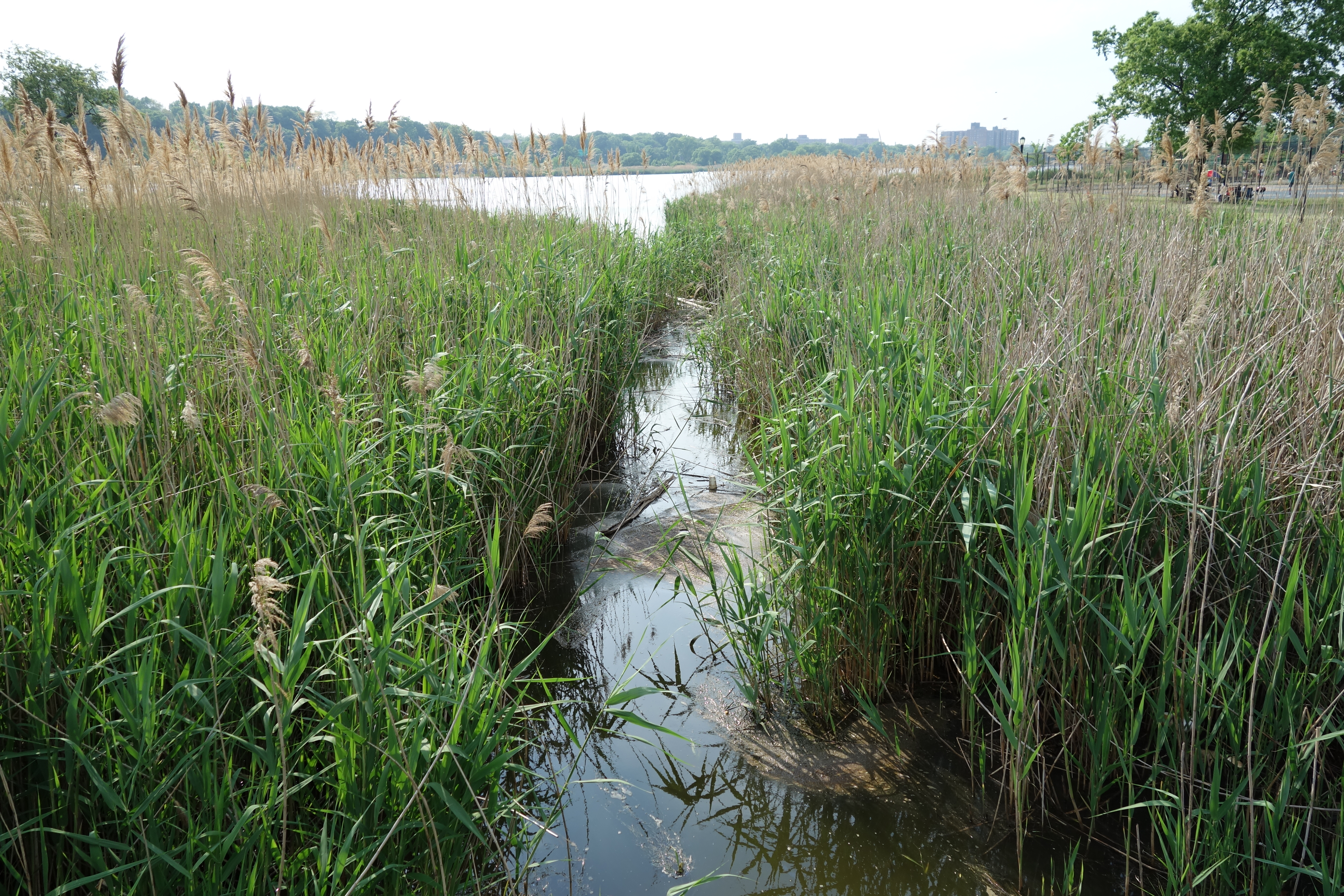
Between Meadow and Willow Lakes

Prior to human development, Flushing Meadows was originally a tidal marsh, with Flushing Creek receiving south-flowing waters from the tides of Flushing Bay. The northernmost portion of the river, near its mouth, is still a saltwater wetland area. The wetlands consist of invasive phragmites, a genus of wild grasses, as well as cordgrass. However, the addition of fill on the riverfront has raised the wetland habitat to about the same elevation as the upland habitats, thus endangering wetland plant species that cannot grow at such elevations. North of the LIRR embankment, the left-bank wetland on the Flushing River contains plants such as common reed, field horsetail, chicory, common plantain, and native marsh elder and cordgrass. The birds observed on the northern portion of the river include both waterfowl and wading egrets.

=== Freshwater section ===
Although Willow and Meadow Lakes were built as freshwater lakes and dammed to mitigate tidal effects, flooding continues to affect Flushing Meadows–Corona Park. The lakes are also highly eutrophic, due to nutrients such as phosphorus from the former marshland seeping into the water, leading to the death of fish in the lakes. The regular tidal action that would filter the lakes is prevented by the dam. In addition, the lakes are subject to pollution and storm runoff from the nearby highways, via pipes which feed into the lakes.

Several fish species native to marine habitats regularly swim into Meadow and Willow Lakes. Fish species native to Meadow Lake include American eel, largemouth bass, northern snakehead (an invasive species), and white mullet. Willow Lake is named for the many species of willow plants which inhabit the area. Phragmites are also abundant, but attempts to kill the phragmites with pesticides have led to further fish kill. Numerous berry-producing trees and shrubs near Willow Lake attract several migratory bird species. The biodiversity of the lakes has been found to be much lower than other water bodies of comparable size.

== Recreational usage ==
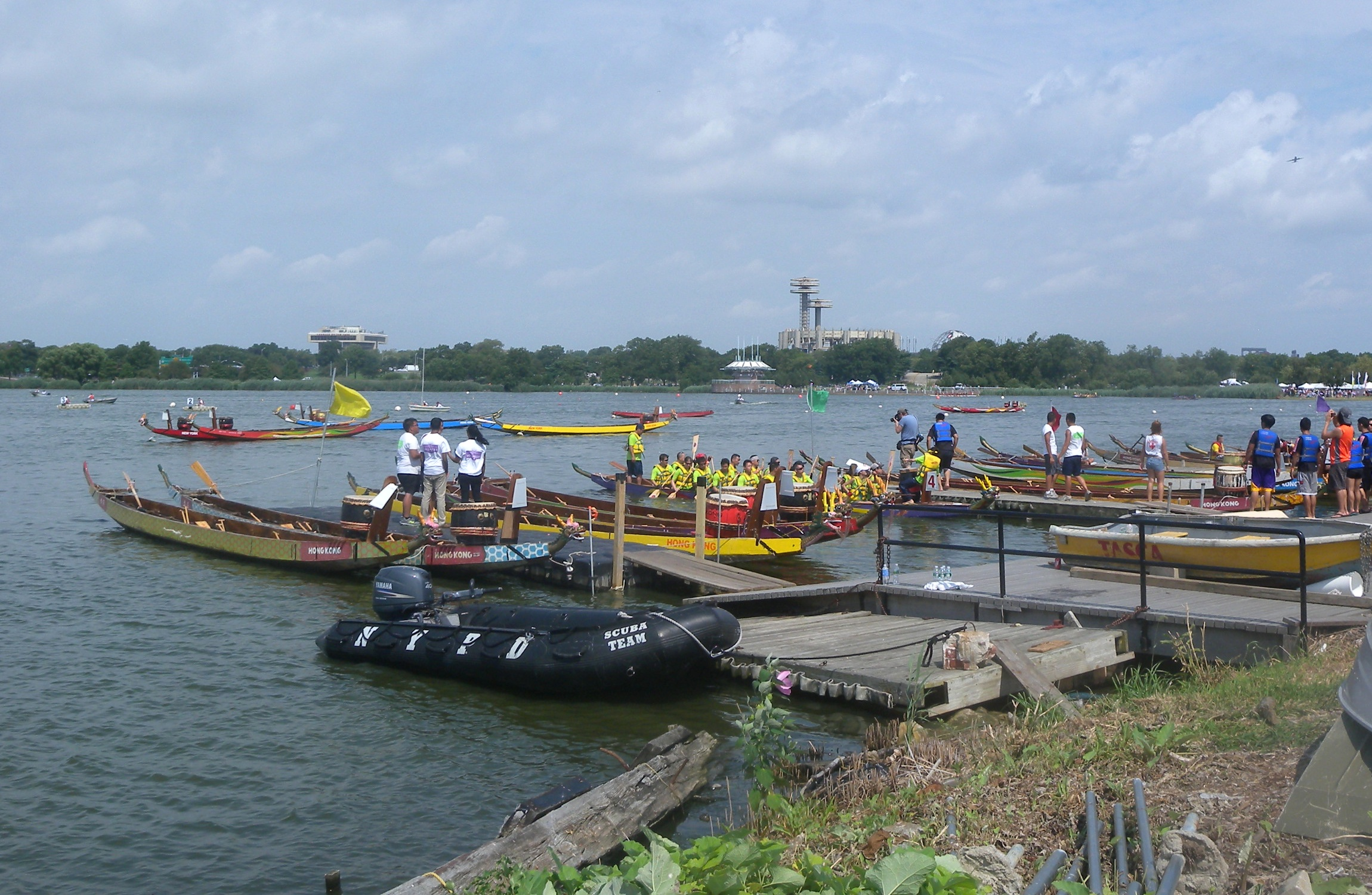
Boat launch on Meadow Lake

Recreational uses on the Flushing River are limited mostly to its southern portion, since its northern portion is heavily industrial, and the central portion is not navigable. The land around Meadow Lake contains open grass, picnic and grilling areas, and baseball and cricket fields as part of Flushing Meadows–Corona Park. Meadow Lake contains a boat house, one of two structures that remain from the 1939 World's Fair, the other being the Queens Museum. Rental boats are available at the boathouse for rowing and paddleboating, and Meadow Lake is also the site of rowing activities for non-profit Row New York, with teams practicing on the lake for much of the year. Meadow Lake also hosts the annual Hong Kong Dragon Boat Festival in New York, and teams from New York practice in Meadow Lake during the summer months. The American Small Craft Association also houses a fleet of over a dozen 14.5-foot (4.4 m) sloop-rigged sailboats, used for teaching, racing, and recreation by the club's members. Bicycling paths extend around Meadow Lake and connect to the Brooklyn–Queens Greenway.

For the 1939 fair, Meadow Lake was temporarily renamed "Fountain Lake" and "Liberty Lake". During the fairs, the land on the north shore and part of the eastern shore of the lake was used as an amusement area, and for the 1964 fair, large parking lots were added on the east and west shores. The lots were removed and converted to parkland after the 1964 fair.

The Willow Lake area of the park is a nature reserve called the Willow Lake Preserve. The area around Willow Lake originally also contained sports fields and park trails, until it was fenced off and turned into a preserve in 1976. The Willow Lake Trail, a nature trail around Willow Lake, was reopened in 2013 and is part of the Willow Lake Preserve.

== History ==
=== Early years ===
During at least three glacial periods, including the Wisconsin glaciation around 20,000 years ago, ice sheets advanced south across North America carving moraines, valleys, and hills. In particular, bays and estuaries were formed along the north shore of Long Island. During glaciation, the meadows surrounding the Flushing River were formed just north of the terminal moraine that runs across Long Island, which consisted of sand, gravel, clay and boulders. The moraine created a drainage divide, with rivers north of the moraine such as the future Flushing River emptying into the north shore. The Flushing Meadows site became a glacial lake, and then a salt marsh after the ice melted. Prior to glaciation, the Flushing River valley was used by the Hudson River to drain southward into the Atlantic Ocean. Through the 19th century, wetlands continued to straddle Flushing River. Species inhabiting the site included waterfowl and fiddler crab, with fish using water pools for spawning.

The area was first settled by Algonquian Native Americans of Long Island (referred to erroneously as "Mantinecocks"). They consisted of the Canarsee and Rockaway Lenape groups, which inhabited coastal wetlands across Queens and Brooklyn.

The town of Flushing was settled in 1645 under charter of the Dutch West India Company. Both the town and the creek were thus named after the port of Vlissingen, in the southwestern Netherlands. The first European settler to move to the vicinity of Flushing Creek was Robert Coe, an Englishman who built a house near Horse Brook (now the site of the Long Island Expressway) on the creek's western bank.

=== 19th and early 20th centuries ===
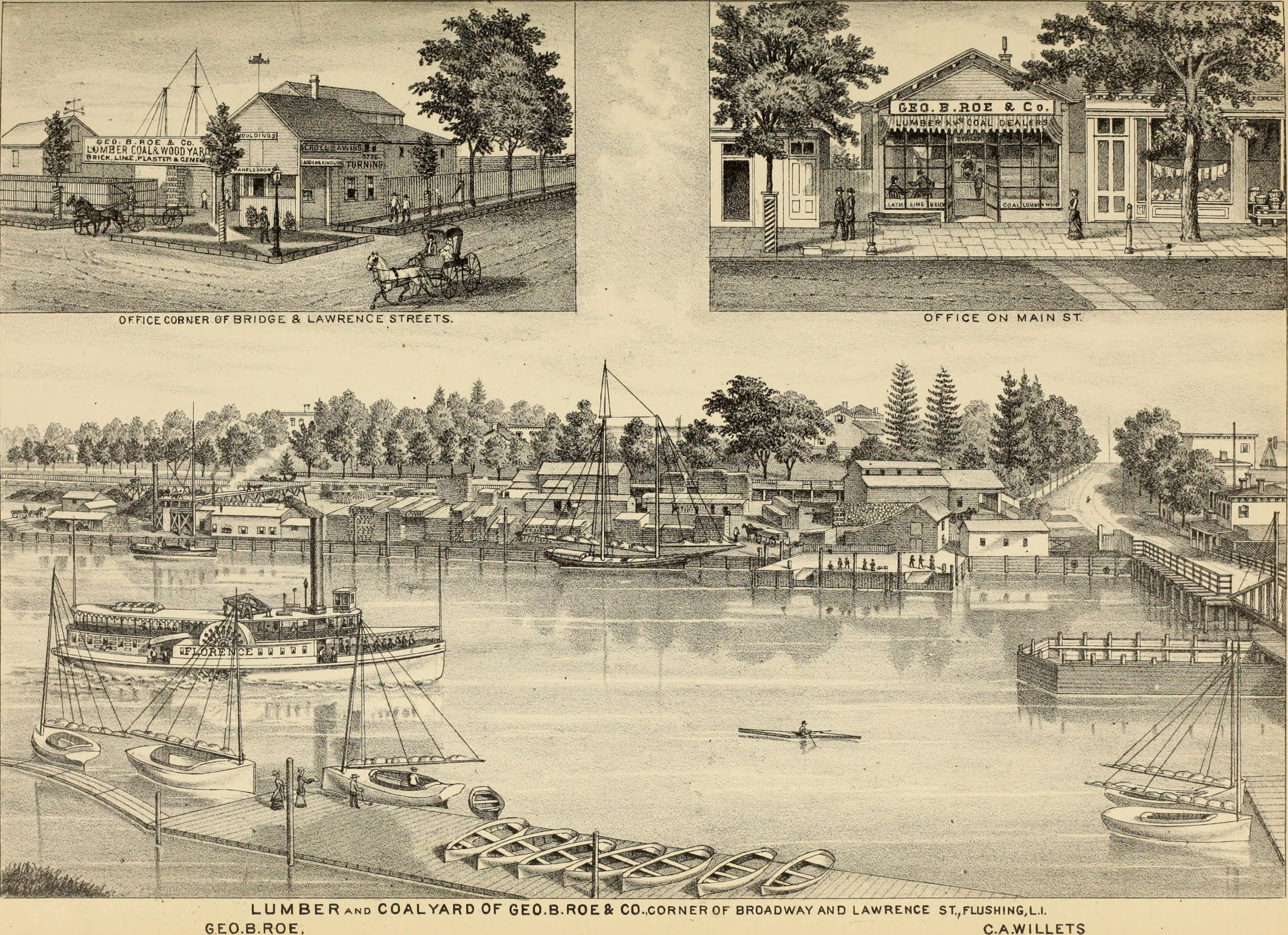
Busy Flushing Harbor in 1882. Bridge on the right carries Broadway, later called Northern Boulevard

The earliest fixed crossing of the Flushing Creek was the Northern Boulevard bridge, built in 1801 and rebuilt six times through 1980. Prior to the bridge's construction, a ferry had carried passengers between the two banks of the creek.

In the 1850s, the New York and Flushing Railroad built a railroad line across the river leading to what was then a railroad terminal on the east side of the river in Flushing. The railroad was acquired by the Flushing and North Side Railroad in 1868, and built junctions with the Flushing and Woodside Railroad, the Whitestone and Westchester Railroad, and the Central Railroad of Long Island on the west side of the river throughout the 1870s. The Flushing and North Side also built a spur leading to Flushing Bay just southwest of the Flushing River delta. All lines were acquired by the Long Island Rail Road, and most were later abandoned, except for the former NY&F main line, which became the LIRR's Port Washington Branch.

In the early 20th century, the northern part of the Flushing River was home to a regatta club, the Wahnetah Boat Club. Its clubhouse was located on its right bank near the Northern Boulevard (formerly Jackson Avenue) bridge. The club was founded in 1900, replacing the disbanded Nereus Boat Club, and in 1905 was described as one of the first such clubs on the East Coast. By 1917, the boat club appeared to have been repurposed as a veterans' association.

=== 20th century improvements ===
Around 1907, contractor Michael Degnon purchased large tracts of marsh near Flushing Creek. At the time, the land was considered "all but worthless", as an archaeological assessment later described the land. Degnon envisioned using the site to create a large industrial port around Flushing Bay, similar to a terminal he developed in Long Island City. By 1911, Degnon had created a plan along with the United States Department of War and the Queens Topographical Bureau. The plan envisioned widening Flushing River and creating docks for ships, with numerous factories and freight facilities. The Rivers and Harbors Act of 1913 appropriated funding for deepening the channel through Flushing Bay into Flushing River. The next year, surveys were made for the construction of a 5.4-mile (8.7 km) canal to connect Flushing River and Newtown Creek, plans for which dated back at least a century. To create the port, Degnon proceeded to fill the Flushing River wetlands using household coal refuse ashes and street sweepings from Brooklyn. The northern end of the site was filled via dredging. The filling for the north meadow was complete in 1916, but the prospect of creating a port was halted in 1917 by material restrictions caused by World War I, and a lack of federal support for the project. Dumping of ash into the meadows continued, however, fueled by the increased use of garbage incinerators in the city. The pollution was chronicled by F. Scott Fitzgerald in The Great Gatsby.

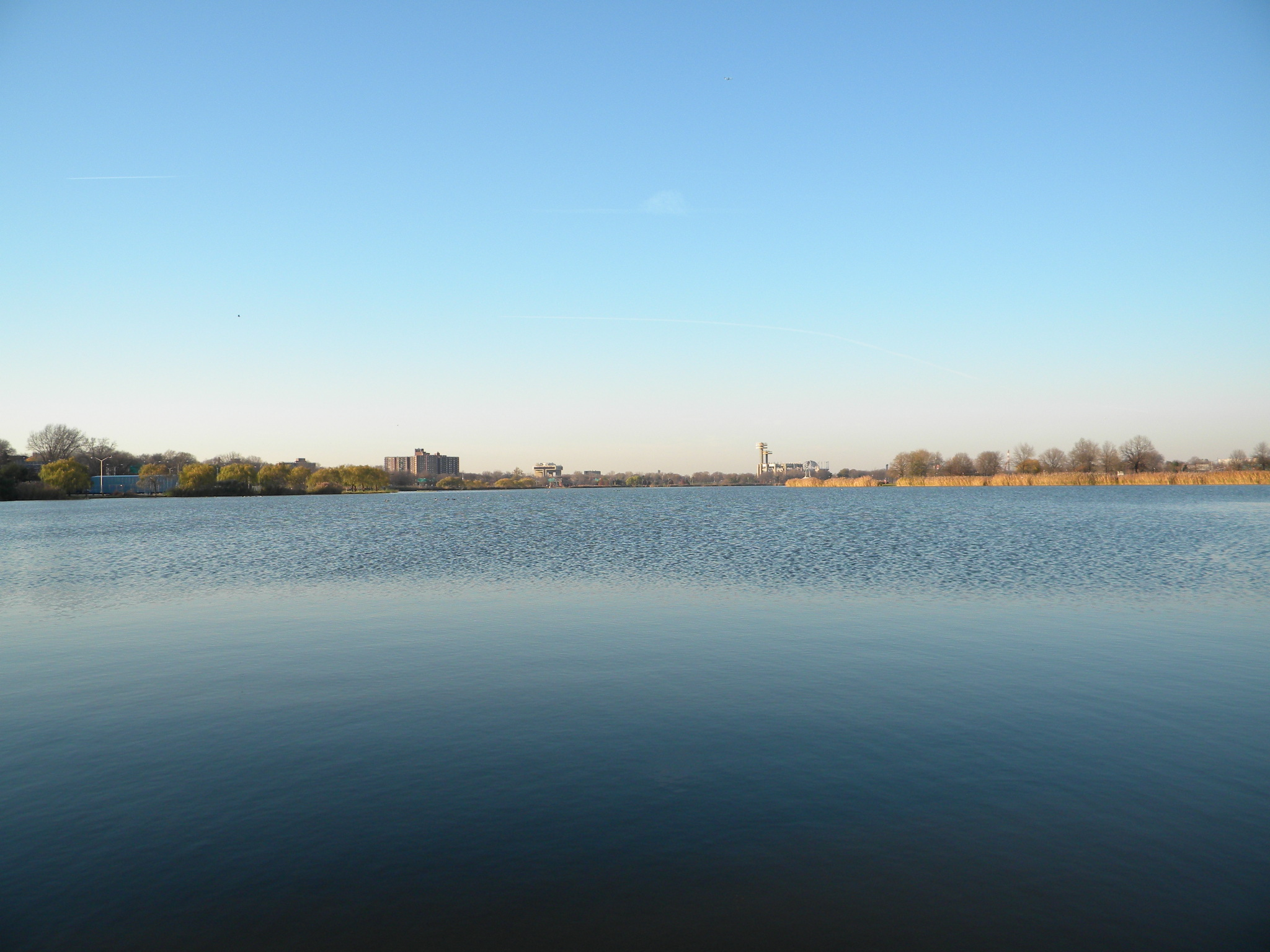
Meadow Lake, created in the 1930s by expanding Flushing River

In 1930, New York City parks commissioner Robert Moses released plans for numerous parks and highways in the city, including a Flushing River Park. Five years later, Flushing Meadows was selected as the site for the 1939 World's Fair. Work on the World's Fair site began the next year. The project primarily involved leveling the ash mounds, with the leftover material used to fill other areas of the meadow. Two parts of the river were excavated to create Meadow and Willow Lake, while much of the rest of the Flushing River was diverted into underground culverts. The Tidal Gate Bridge was built at the park's northern end to prevent tidal flow from flooding the lakes. In addition to recreation, the lakes would serve as repositories for excess storm runoff. By then, Horse Brook had already been covered over, while Kissena Creek was in the process of being covered over. Dammed and reduced in size, the Flushing River became navigable only north of Roosevelt Avenue. At its southern end, the Jamaica subway yard reduced some of the flow coming from the headwaters. The central portion of the Flushing River was repurposed as part of the World's Fair's Court of States.

In 1961, in advance of the 1964 New York World's Fair, the creek's middle section was diverted underground. Flowing out of Meadow Lake, the creek was reduced to a canal beneath the Van Wyck Expressway, narrowing into pipes going into the Fountain of the Planets, a circular pool used for fountain displays. From there, the pipes took the water toward the tidal bridge, reemerging as a creek.

=== Restoration and redevelopment ===
The Flushing River was once a clear waterway, but during the 1920s, the river was polluted by various industrial wastes, especially along its northern section. Over the years, pollution from the Willets Point Blvd. industrial area, surrounding highways, and dumping made the river a health hazard. By the 1970s, Flushing River and Flushing Bay had become neglected and polluted.

In 1971, a hundred Flushing residents protested in support of a cleanup of the Flushing River, and state assemblyman Leonard P. Stavisky showed federal, state, and city officials the evidence of pollution in Flushing River. The next year, Councilman Morton Povman, and Flushing Meadow Park Action Committee president Albert Mauro sought to rehabilitate the Flushing River and Bay to their natural conditions and extend Flushing Meadows-Corona Park to the river banks. Both men argued that if these conditions were corrected and made, all of New York City would benefit from it. Furthermore, under the intervention and proposal of both Morton Povman and Peter Vallone, a group of high city officials agreed to begin immediate work on the long-term task of cleaning up this waterway. The late Abe Wolfson, founder of the Queens Historical Society, became active in the fight to restore the river to its original condition. The cleanup involved dredging and rebuilding manholes in the Kissena Park and Kissena Corridor Park sewer systems, which hid the underground Kissena Creek, as well as cleaning up part of the Queens Boulevard sewer system.

In the late 1980s, there were disputes over whether to build a sewage treatment plant in Flushing Meadows Park as part of the Flushing Bay's cleanup. The tank was to be located in the park next to the Flushing River, some 70 feet (21 m) underground. The Flushing Bay CSO Retention Facility, also called the Flushing Creek CSO Plant, was completed by 2007. The Al Oerter Recreation Center, located above the facility, opened two years later. Additionally, the northern part of the river (near the mouth) was restored as wetlands in 2008 as part of the reconstruction of the Whitestone Expressway bridge over the river. Plans to combine Meadow and Willow Lakes were proposed in 2005 as part of the failed New York City bid for the 2012 Summer Olympics. Following the failure of the bid, the New York City Department of Environmental Protection sought a scaled-back restoration plan for the lakes.

In Flushing, the right (east) bank of the Flushing River remains unrestored. In 1993, the city proposed to rezone the plot bounded by the Flushing River, College Point Boulevard, and the LIRR Port Washington Branch on the right bank of the river. Along this stretch of the river, the most prominent building was the former Serval Zipper Factory, which was later used as a U-Haul storage center. While much of this area remained underdeveloped through the 2010s, the Sky View Parc apartment complex was completed between Roosevelt Avenue and the LIRR in 2011, and the rest of the site was proposed as the Flushing West development area in 2018. In addition, the redevelopment of the industrial Willets Point Blvd. neighborhood on the left bank of the river was announced in 2007, and after several delays, was restarted in 2018. Following news of these redevelopments, an organization called the Friends of Flushing Creek was created in mid-2014 to advocate for a greater cleanup of the river and bay.

== See also ==
- List of rivers in New York
