= Flushing Meadows Corona Park Aquatics Center =

Recreation center in Queens, New York

Flushing Meadows Corona Park Aquatics Center and Ice Rink
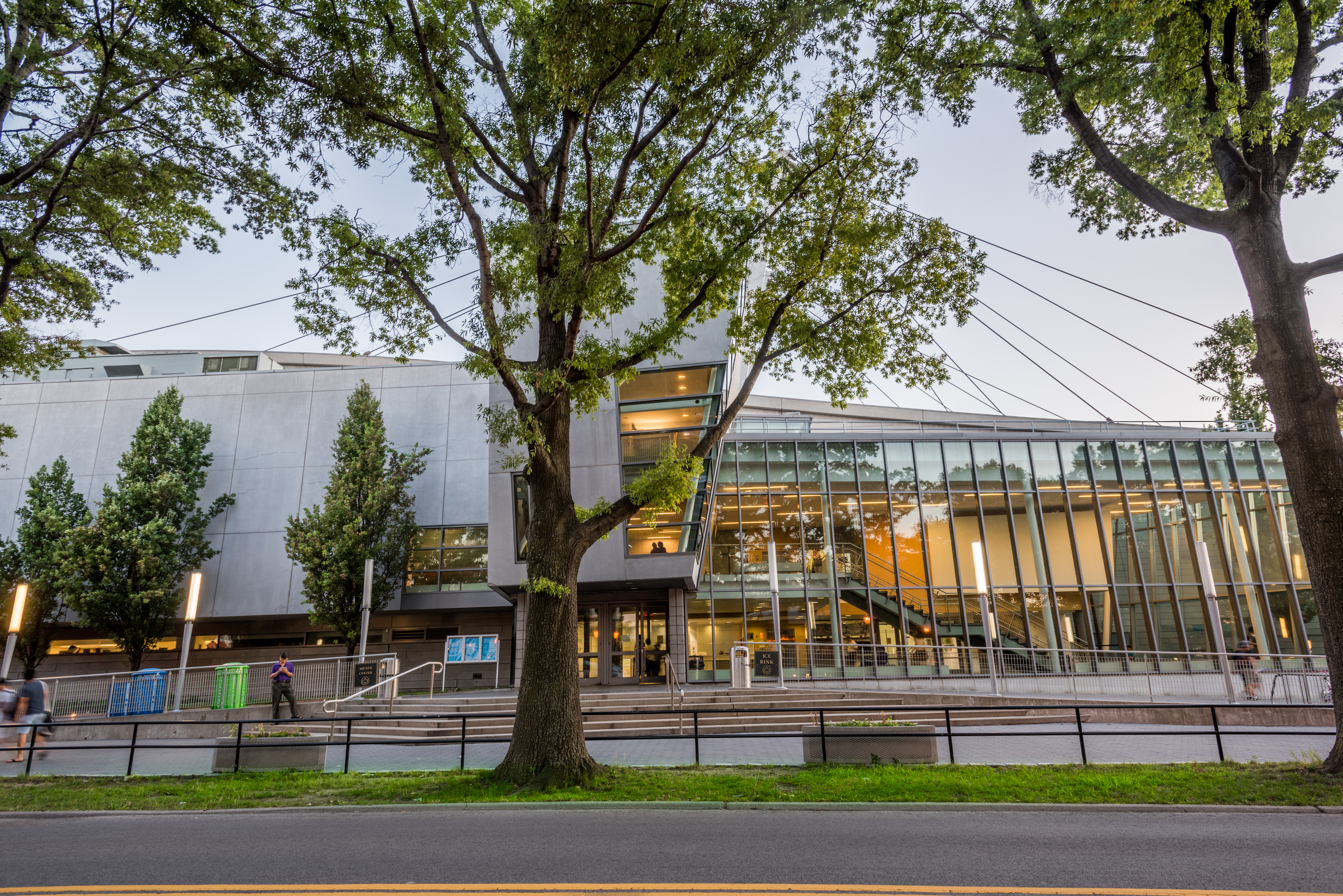
- Main entrance
- Interactive map of the Flushing Meadows Corona Park Aquatics Center and Ice Rink area
- Alternative names: Flushing Meadows Natatorium

General information
- Location: 125–40 Roosevelt Avenue, Flushing, New York 11355, United States
- Coordinates: 40°45′06″N 73°50′15″W
- Construction started: 2001
- Completed: February 2008
- Cost: $66.3 million
- Owner: City of New York

Technical details
- Floor area: 110,000 square feet (10,000 m^{2})

Design and construction
- Architecture firm: Handel Architects; Kevin Hom Architects
- Structural engineer: Geiger Engineers
- Awards: 2009 AISC Ideas^{2} Award for Innovative Design in Engineering and Architecture with Structural Steel

The Flushing Meadows Corona Park Aquatics Center and Ice Rink, also known as the Flushing Meadows Corona Park Aquatics Center or Flushing Meadows Natatorium, is a 110,000-square-foot (10,000 m^{2}) facility in Flushing Meadows-Corona Park, Queens, New York City, with an Olympic-sized pool and an NHL-standard rink. Built in 2008, the $66.3 million project is the first indoor public pool to open in New York City in four decades. Initially, the building was intended to serve as the venue for water polo events during the 2012 Summer Olympics, but when the city's bid was lost to London, the New York City Department of Parks and Recreation proceeded to build the pool anyway. The result is an innovative building with 130-foot-high twin masts and a swooping roof form. The masts are an architectural feature extending up into the Queens skyline as well as the structural supports for the cable-stayed roof. This design provides the clear spans necessary to house an Olympic swimming pool along with an ice skating rink.

The Flushing Meadows Natatorium was designed by Handel Architects in association with Kevin Hom Architects (formerly Kevin Hom +Andrew Goldman Architects).

== History ==
The 1939 and 1964 World's Fair pavilions, which previously occupied the site, inspired the architects to design the canopy roof suspended above the natatorium and rink. The World's Fair was a universal exposition showcasing various cultural exhibitions from all over the world.

=== Development and early years ===
The Flushing Meadows Corona Park Aquatics Center was envisioned in 1999 by Mayor Rudy Giuliani and Borough President Claire Shulman to revive the park. The original concept of a moderately sized pool was enlarged to an Olympic-size pool with an indoor ice rink as well. The building's foundation was completed in 2001 but after the September 11 attacks the project was halted due to funding issues. Finally, in 2003, the Natatorium was designated as the swimming arena in New York City's bid to host the 2012 Summer Olympics.

The Parks Department partnered with the Economic Development Corporation and plans re-commenced for New York City to build its first public indoor swimming pool in 40 years. Upon its completion in February 2008, the Flushing Meadows Corona Park Natatorium and Ice Rink became the largest recreation complex ever built in a city park at 110,000 square feet. By 2020, the facility (renamed the Flushing Meadows Corona Park Aquatics Center) accommodated 350,000 annual visitors.

=== Repairs ===
NYC Parks announced in late 2019 that the Flushing Meadows Corona Park Aquatics Center would have to close for emergency repairs to its roof. The building closed in January 2020 for the repairs, which were originally scheduled to take six weeks. The completion of the repairs was delayed by the onset of the COVID-19 pandemic in New York City and was finally finished in July 2021. However, the center remained closed, as the city government decided to repair the swimming pools' floors after the pandemic. Workers had installed netting on the ceiling by late 2021. At the time, NYC Parks indicated that the center would reopen temporarily while officials devised plans for a more permanent repair to the roof. The center did not reopen at that time, and by November 2022, the renovation of the pool floors was only 10 percent complete.

The pools reopened in February 2023; at the time, NYC Parks was planning to close the building again for repairs in 2025. The building closed again in March 2024 so workers could replace panels on the pool floors. The Flushing Meadows Corona Park Aquatics Center was again closed in July 2025 due to mechanical issues and the discovery of high concentrations of ozone in the ground.

== Site ==
Attractions and geographical features of Flushing Meadows–Corona Park
Attractions and geographical features of Flushing Meadows–Corona Park:
1 Citi Field
2 Etihad Park (under construction)
3 Flushing Meadows Carousel and Queens Zoo
4 Flushing Meadows Corona Park Aquatics Center
5 Flushing River and Creek
6 Meadow Lake and Hong Kong Dragon Boat Festival
7 Metropolitan Park (planned) and Shea Stadium (demolished)
8 Mets–Willets Point subway station
9 Mets–Willets Point LIRR station
10 National Tennis Center and United States Pavilion (demolished)
11 New York Hall of Science
12 New York State Pavilion and Queens Theatre
13 Queens Botanical Garden
14 Queens Museum
15 Queens Night Market
16 Terrace on the Park
17 Unisphere
18 Willow Lake
19 World's Fair subway station (demolished)

The Flushing Meadows Natatorium is sited along the northeast perimeter of Flushing Meadows Corona Park, juxtaposed between the Van Wyck Expressway and the 1250-acre park greenery. The building is situated between an urban environment to the north, which consist of major streets and highways, with the park on its western facade.

The siting and procession of the building refers to the World's Fair that preceded its existence. With entrances on both the east and west side following a radial geometry, the designer draws on the historic Fountain of the Planets exhibition. A plaza is located at the eastern entrance of the building that extends from three paths that circulate to the building's park spaces. On the western façade, another entrance opens onto a path that leads to 8 soccer fields, the Flushing Meadows Golf Center, the Industry Pond, and the Unisphere, all of which are on the westernmost part of the 1250-acre park.

== Architecture ==
=== Exterior ===
Influenced by the World's Fair pavilions, the 110,000 square foot aquatic center is the largest recreation complex ever built in a New York City park. The curved suspended roof spans over both the Olympic size swimming pool and an NHL regulation hockey rink.

The programmatic requirements of this complex shaped decisions about structure and materials. Designing the structural system and cable-stayed roof was a feat for Geiger Engineers. The structural engineers developed this structural envelope due to the necessity for a clear span- limiting chlorine from damaging building materials. A clear spanned space proved to be the solution that answered the need for minimal maintenance and avoidance of damage to structural elements. The engineers chose to place the pool and rink end-to–end, so that they would serve, structurally speaking as counterweights of a seesaw. At the midpoint are the "linchpins": the two 130-foot masts from which the roof is suspended. The masts are composed of 1-¼" plates that are stacked at the junction of the pool and rink. The masts are designed so that as they soar through the roof, the diameter narrows to accommodate lateral movement. In order to support the 120-foot-by-230-foot clear spans, twelve cables were extended from each mast to specific connection points on the roof. The twelve 3-inch diameter A586 strand cables are critical elements in connecting the masts to the roof. To keep the roof from lifting, the roof is decked in concrete planks that counteract windloads. The concrete planks sit on longitudinal girders that create the swooping form of the envelope.

Erecting the structure demanded precise calculations. The standards for cable structure construction required that the engineers create a strategy of execution, documenting each step, prior to construction. In order for the structure to be erected, much shoring and preliminary bracing was done to relieve the dead load from the gravity columns prior to cable installation. Geiger Engineers devised a plan in which the perimeter columns were erected first, after which the concrete planks and roof framing were placed, followed by the erection of the masts, and lastly the installation of each cable. The concrete planks on the roof sit on steel framing, including the large longitudinal girders that create the swooping form of the roof. These girders were fabricated with W36x300s in the middle of the W27x194s at the sides. All of the wide flange shapes and masts were fabricated form ASTM A572 Grade 50 steel, while the diagonal roof bracing were A 500 Grade B. Due to the precisely choreographed steel design, the Flushing Meadow Natatorium received the 2009 Innovative Design in Engineering and Architecture with Structural Steel award. (IDEAS^{2}). The IDEAS^{2} awards recognize outstanding achievements in engineering and architecture on structural steel projects around the country. The project was judged on structural steel innovation, with an emphasis on creative solutions to project requirements. The form was directly derived from the structural requirements of the program.

Visual interventions within the buildings allow constant interaction between patrons and the outer environment. There are floor to ceiling expansive windows in the pool area and a spiraling staircase with windows opening into the park. The building's main facade is cloaked in a single concrete matrix of different aggregates used to form the mixture of surfaces within each section. Tucked between the concrete matrix are multicolored glass tiles reminiscent of the glimmering colors of water. These apertures, which are sprinkled along the building's facade, cast varying shadows on the interior.

=== Interior ===
As users make their way from the lobby to the pool level, they circulate in a spiral path. The rectangular pavilion holds both the pool and the ice rink end to end. Constituents can enjoy the facilities year round. The building, a 110,000 square foot facility, engages its natural surroundings. The curtain wall wraps around the western façade, allowing swimmers to engage with the natural environment outside, from flowering crabapple trees in spring, to vibrant maple orchards in fall.

== Gallery ==
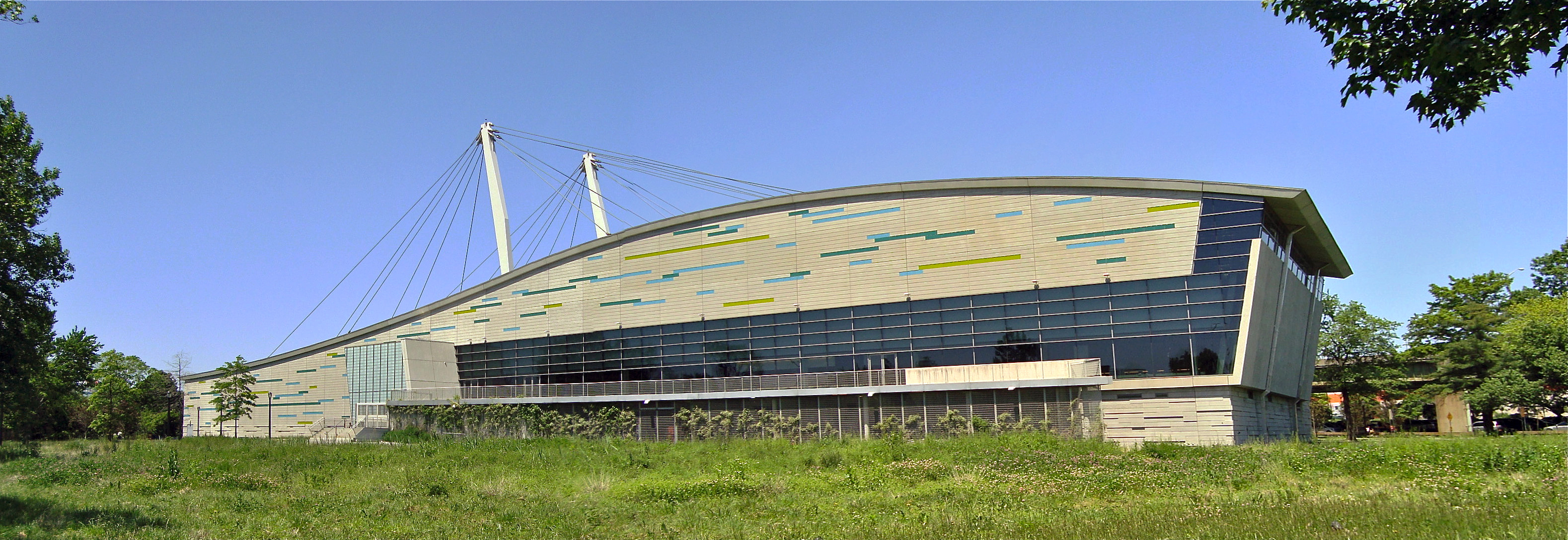
Back of the natatorium

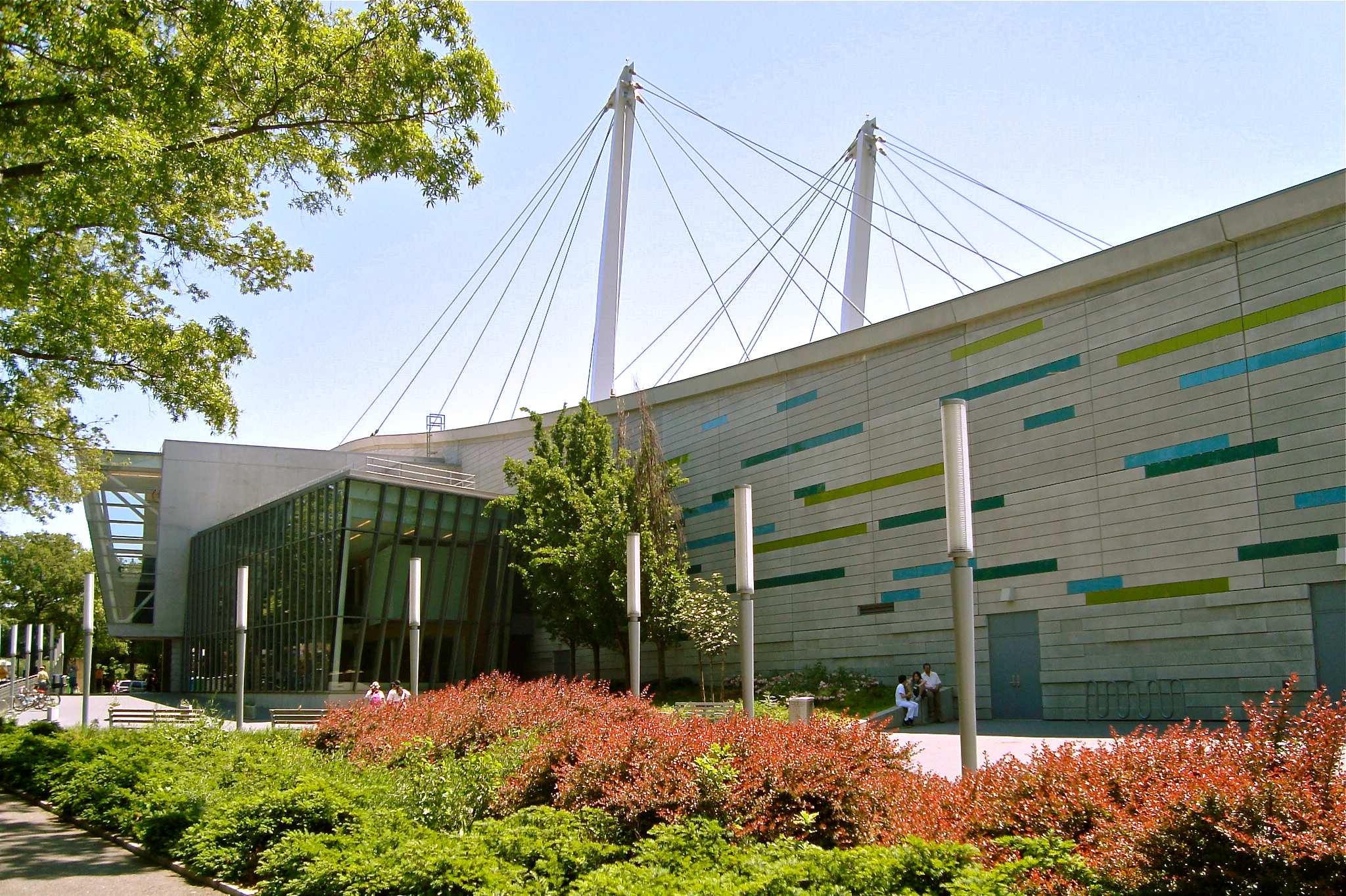
Front façade of concrete matrix and multicolored glass tile

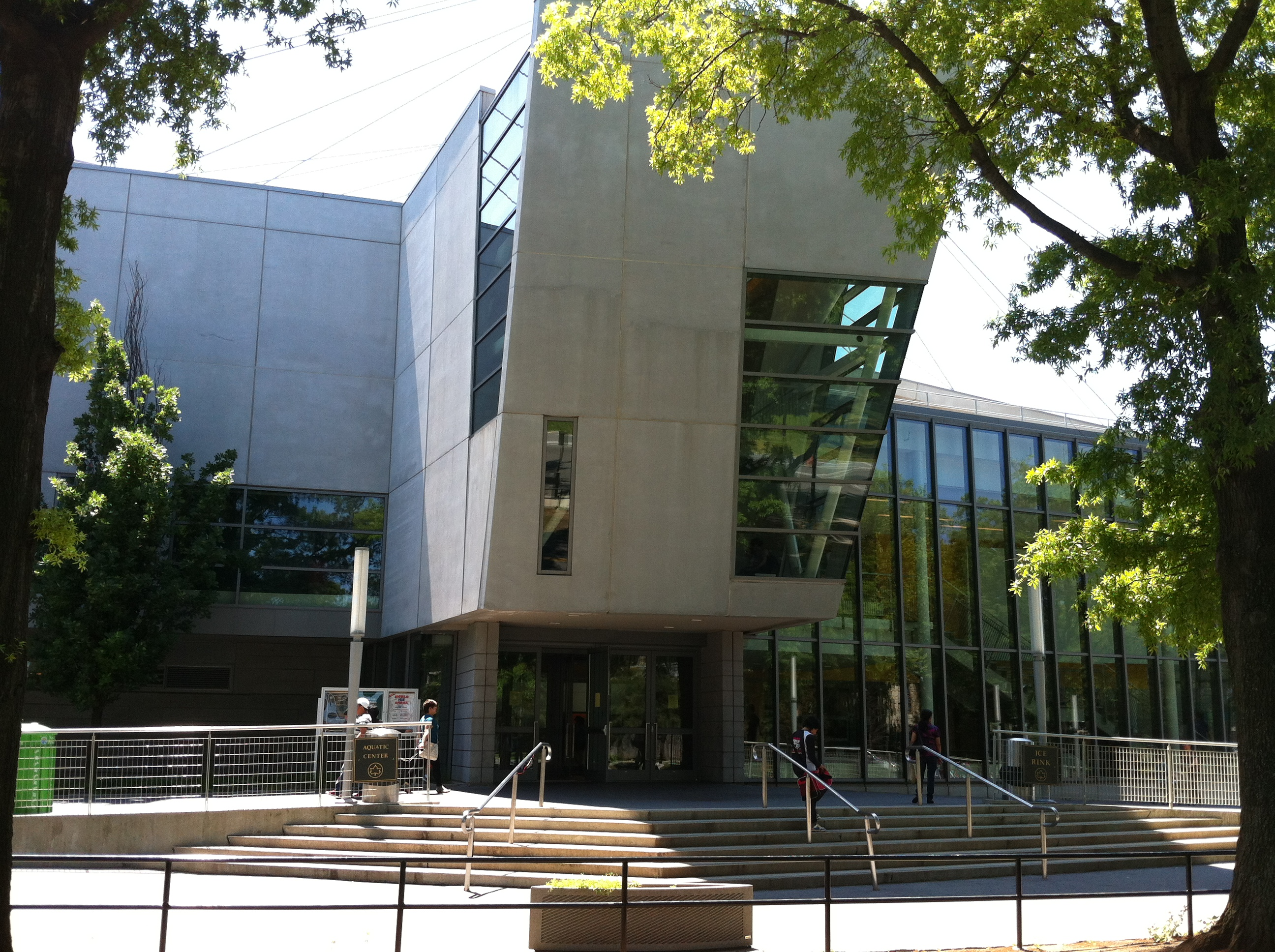
Main plaza of the Natatorium that leads to lobby within.

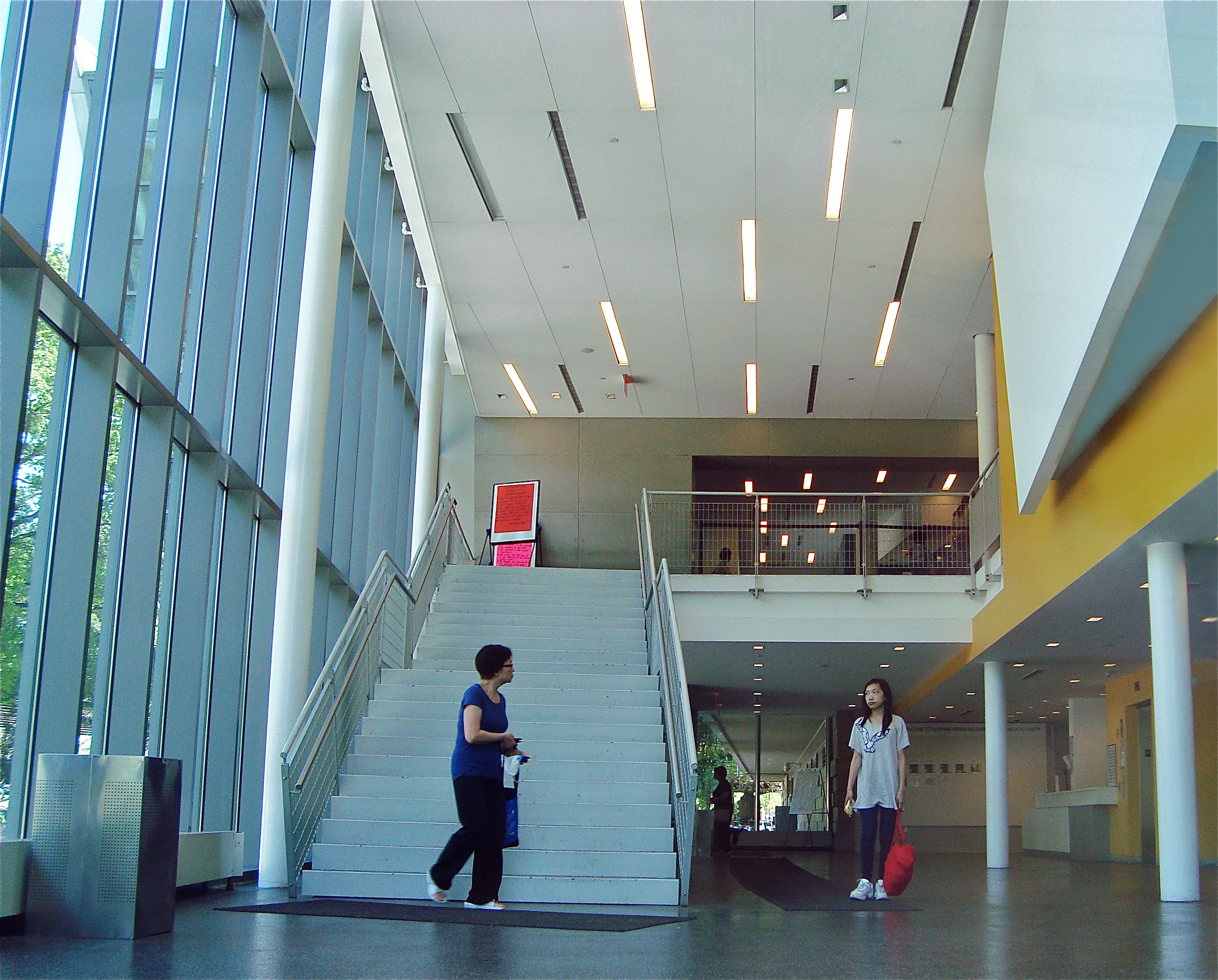
Interior lobby space of the Natatorium

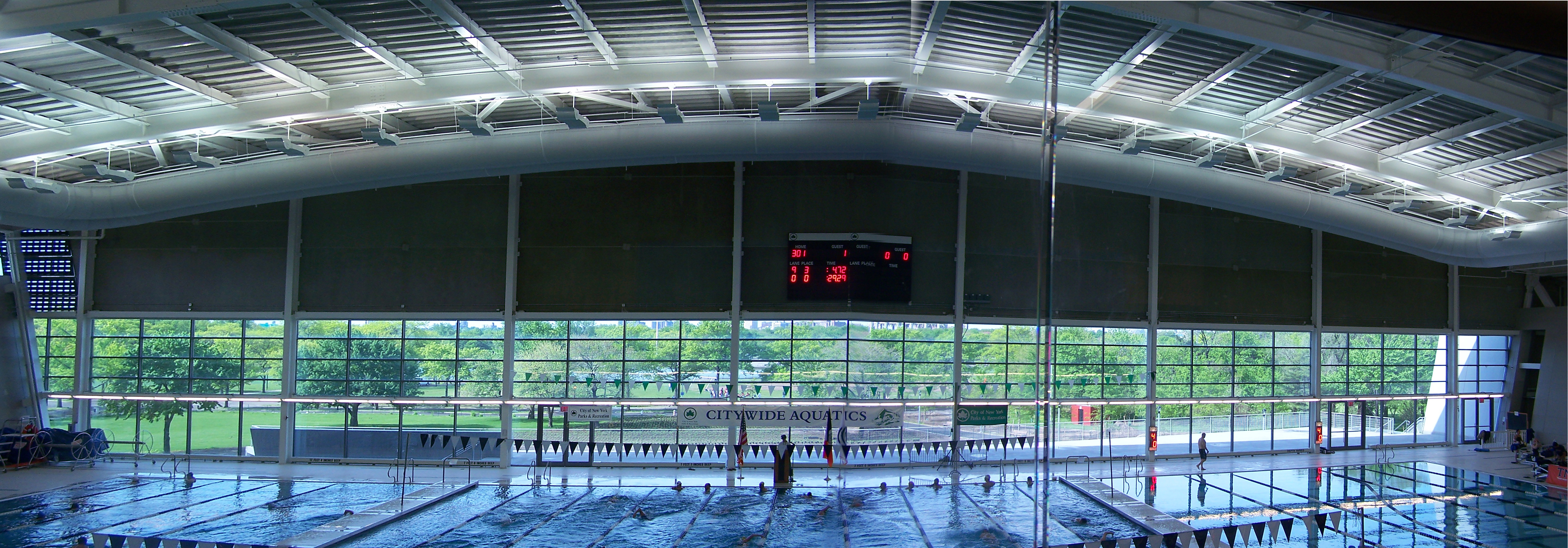
Inside the aquatics center
