= Flushing Meadows Carousel =

Carousel in Queens, New York

- 1964-1965 New York World's Fair Carousel
- U.S. National Register of Historic Places
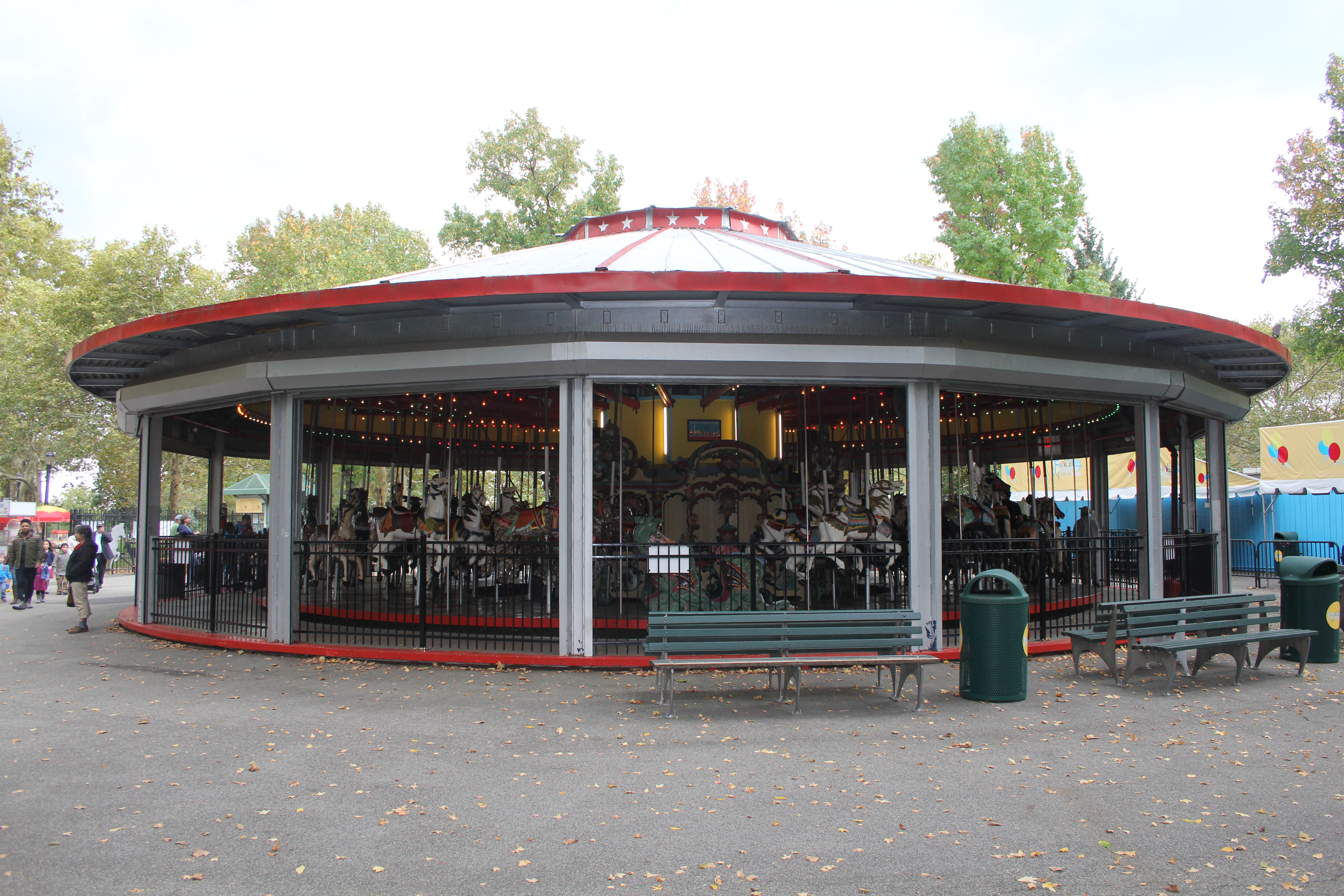
- Carousel in 2014

- Location within New York City
- Location: Flushing, Queens, New York
- Coordinates: 40°44′35″N 73°50′57″W
- Built: 1964–1965
- Architects: William Mangels, Marcus Illions
- NRHP reference No.: 16000038
- Added to NRHP: February 23, 2016

The Flushing Meadows Carousel is a carousel located in Flushing Meadows-Corona Park in the New York City borough of Queens. It contains four rows of figures, including 64 jumping horses, 7 standing horses, 1 menagerie animal (a lion), and 2 chariots. It was created to serve patrons of the 1964 New York World's Fair by combining two earlier carousels, both of which were carved in Coney Island in the first decade of the twentieth century by renowned carver Marcus Illions. During the fair, it stood on a nearby site within the park, and it was moved to its present site in 1968, where it has remained in service ever since.

In 2016 it was listed on the National Register of Historic Places.

== Coney Island predecessors ==
The two predecessor carousels were the Feltman's Carousel (1903) and the Stubbman Carousel (1908), both of which were created for amusement operators in Coney Island. 47 horses and the frame are from the Stubbman Carousel, and 24 horses are from the Feltman's Carousel.

While Coney Island has seen resurgence since 2000, it had been busy during the Great Depression and had over twenty carousels spinning at once. The Feltman's Carousel had a restaurant and beer garden that occupied the site where the Luna Park currently sits, approximately between Jones Walk and West 10th Street. The carousel was indoors but faced Surf Avenue. The “Flying Horses” catalogue issued in 1970 by Rol and Jo Summit noted that some of the horses on Feltman's carousel were left over from an earlier Looff carousel that caught fire, probably around 1899 or 1900. Feltman's carousel is regarded by some as Marcus Illions' masterpiece.

The Stubbman Carousel was located at West 6th Street and Surf Avenue. It was part of the Stubbman's Beer Garden, which sat adjacent to the Hotel Eleanor. The site is currently occupied by the New York Aquarium. The Stubbman machine had 64 horses and spun in Stubbman's Beer Garden until 1953, when it was moved near Steeplechase Park and operated as an independent concession. The Summit article said that the Stubbman Carousel was, “commissioned by George and Henry Stubbman for their beer garden. The building housing the merry-go-round was prominently labeled, ‘Hotel Eleanor, Open All Year.’ The carousel itself was a proud addition to the Marcus-Illions stable. Its handsome Louis XIV chariots put the snake-headed, winged dragons of Feltman to shame. Some of the featured carvings were more lifelike and inventive than the Feltman horses, but the overall effect of the rim and central enclosure was less magical; the Stubbman never gained the widespread acclaim and popularity of its predecessor.”

Both carousels were carved by master carousel carver Marcus Illions. He was one of the premier carvers in the Coney Island style of carving. The creatures that came out of this style were known for flamboyance and a flair for the dramatic. They did not focus on the realism in carving, rather, the woodworkers focused on fantasy when creating their horses. The Feltman Carousel was a classic Illions design and was extremely ornate. Carousel historian Frederick Fried, author of the book A Pictorial History of the Carousel, said it was, “by far the greatest America carrousel.”. The Stubbman horses were a bit more subdued and simpler. Both frames were made by famed Coney Island ride manufacturer William F. Mangels. The Stubbman frame was eventually used on the Flushing Meadows Carousel when the two machines were combined. It has another feature rare to many carousels, slots in the floor that allow the horses to tilt outwards as the machine picks up speed.

The Feltman's carousel spun under a few different owners. It ran from 1903 to 1954 as part Feltman's. In 1954 Dewey Albert and Nathan Handwerker bought the property, improved it, and called it Wonderland. Handwerker eventually wanted out of the deal and Albert now called the shots. He decided to build Astroland, the first phase of which opened in 1962. The carousel operated indoors until 1962 and outdoors through the 1963 season when it was packed up to make room for Astroland's 200-foot Astrotower. On January 18, 1964 Albert, in the New York Times article “’Greatest’ Carousel is Stilled at Coney Island”, said he sold it due to, “Economics. That’s the reason. The carrousel took up too much space and didn’t make enough money.”

== Carousel in Flushing Meadows ==
Attractions and geographical features of Flushing Meadows–Corona Park
Attractions and geographical features of Flushing Meadows–Corona Park:
1 Citi Field
2 Etihad Park (under construction)
3 Flushing Meadows Carousel and Queens Zoo
4 Flushing Meadows Corona Park Aquatics Center
5 Flushing River and Creek
6 Meadow Lake and Hong Kong Dragon Boat Festival
7 Metropolitan Park (planned) and Shea Stadium (demolished)
8 Mets–Willets Point subway station
9 Mets–Willets Point LIRR station
10 National Tennis Center and United States Pavilion (demolished)
11 New York Hall of Science
12 New York State Pavilion and Queens Theatre
13 Queens Botanical Garden
14 Queens Museum
15 Queens Night Market
16 Terrace on the Park
17 Unisphere
18 Willow Lake
19 World's Fair subway station (demolished)

The American Cavalcade Corporation was formed in order to put a carousel at the 1964 New York World's Fair. Various sources, however, give credit to different people. The website “The 1964-65 New York World’s Fair” credits John S. Rogers with forming The American Cavalcade Corporation, while the New York Times obituary of Greer Marechal, Jr., dating from 1968 credits him with the company's formation. Either way, they and other investors pulled together the company and purchased the Feltman's and Stubbman's Carousels. The original idea was to purchase the Feltman's carousel and re-open that machine, but it was in such bad shape it was quickly realized that it could not run again without a huge investment. Therefore, the Stubbman machine was purchased really for the frame and mechanical componentry. Since both frames were made by Mangels the components were typical and the Feltman creatures could be used on the Stubbman frame when the ride re-opened at the fair. Rogers said that he negotiated with a “large parcel in the Industrial Sector, near the main gate (near IBM), that became available at the last minute plan plans for an amusement park-type exhibit by H.L. Hunt was cancelled.” Rogers had an agreement with the S&H Green Stamp store, who would provide funding as the host, but that never came to fruition. This led to the carousel making its owners little money at the fair.

The carousel opened in early July offering rides at 15 cents to patrons of the World's Fair. The article “Galloping Ghost Revived for Fair” in the July 3, 1964 edition of The New York Times said: “The merry-go-round is in Carousel Park, in the fair’s Lake Amusement Area. It opens today in a setting designed to give the boardwalk atmosphere – with an actual boardwalk and small food stands.”” The boardwalk area was owned by some of the same ownership group as the carousel (incorporated as the American Carousel Corporation); they used the concessions to earn supplementary income.

According to Edward Dunne, who was involved in the project, Robert Moses had always wanted the carousel to operate permanently at Flushing Meadows-Corona Park. Three years after the fair ended the carousel was moved to its current home in the park, adjacent to the zoo.

On May 7, 2012, NY Carousel Entertainment was awarded the contract to operate both the Flushing Meadows and Forest Park Carousels. The company made cosmetic repairs to the machine, repainting it, sanding and staining the historic wooden floor, and adding new fencing to the entire area. It also added an additional family ride at the carousel, the Choo Choo, a Rio Grande Train.

== Gallery ==
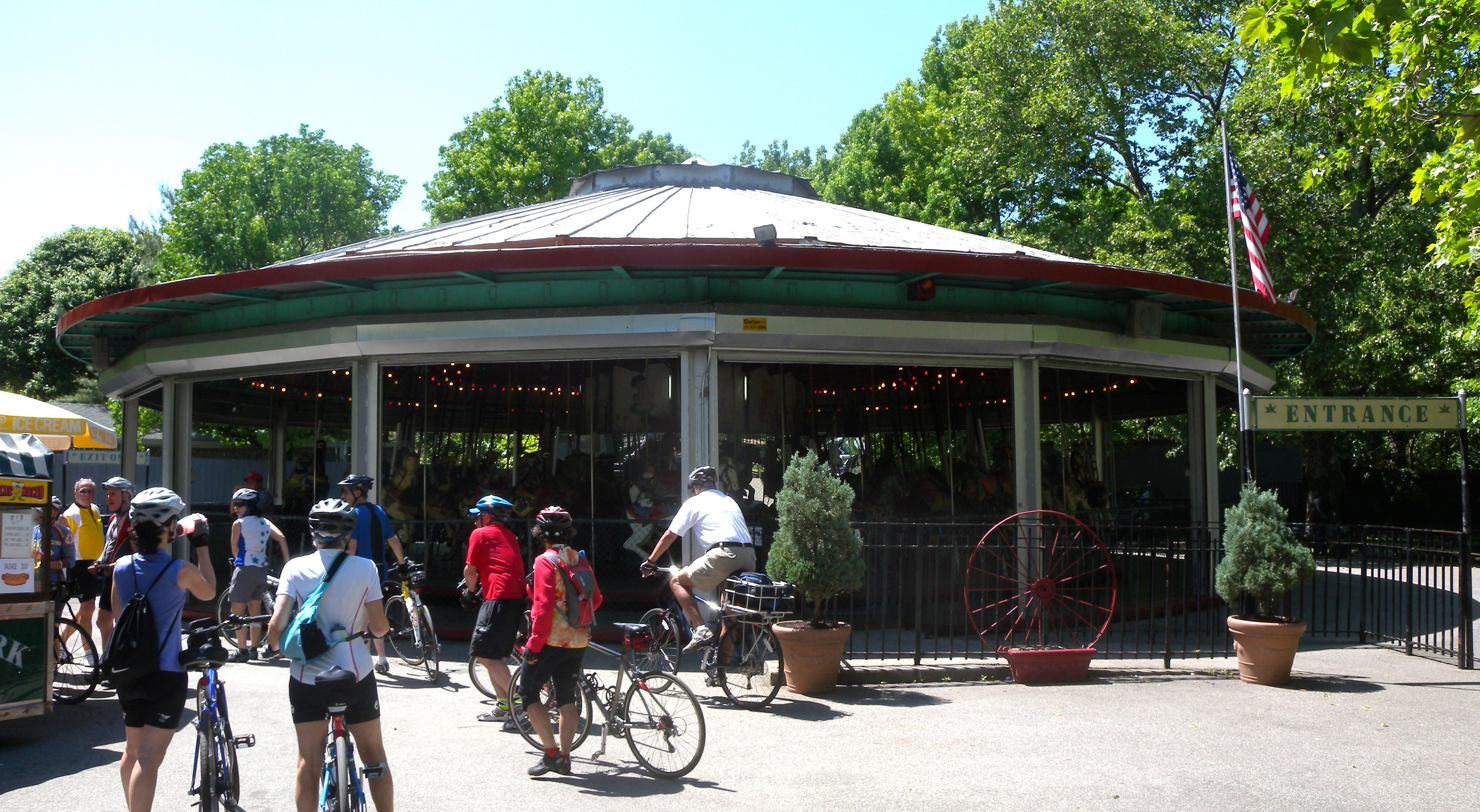
The carousel is now located in a small amusements area near the zoo in Flushing Meadows-Corona Park.

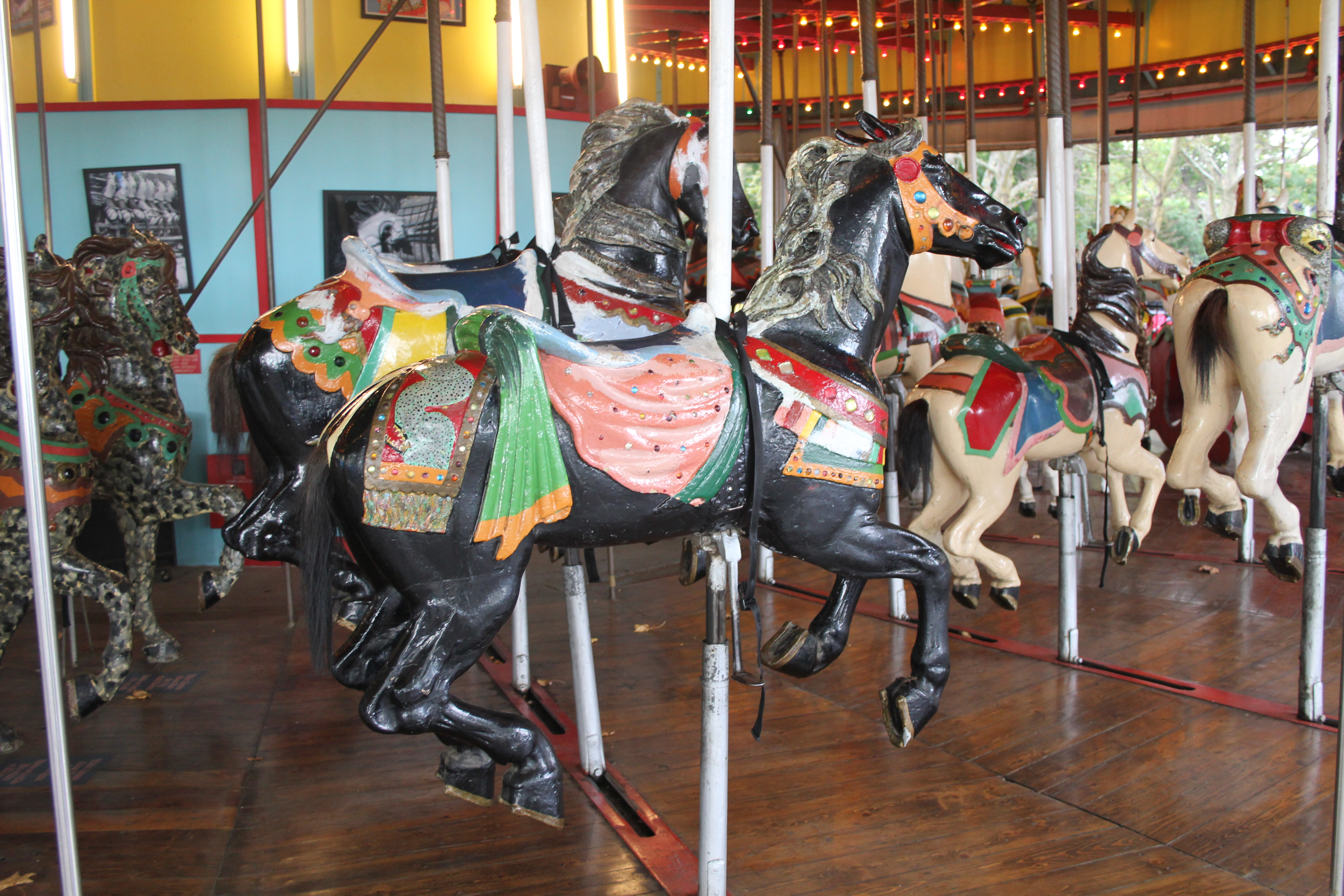
Note the slots in the floor that allow the horses to tilt while the carousel is in motion, an unusual feature.

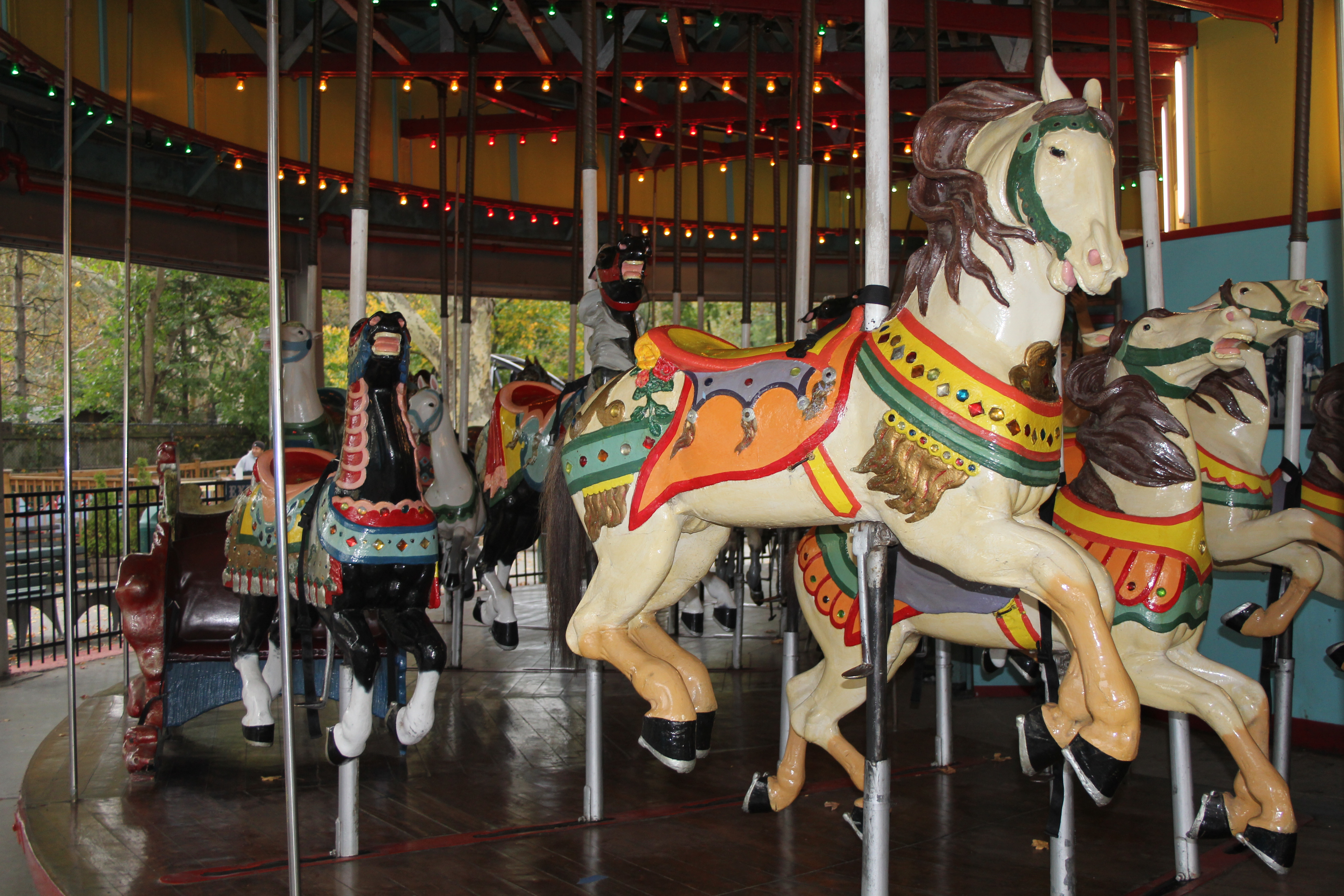
The flamboyant ornamentation was characteristic of the "Coney Island" style of carousel carving.

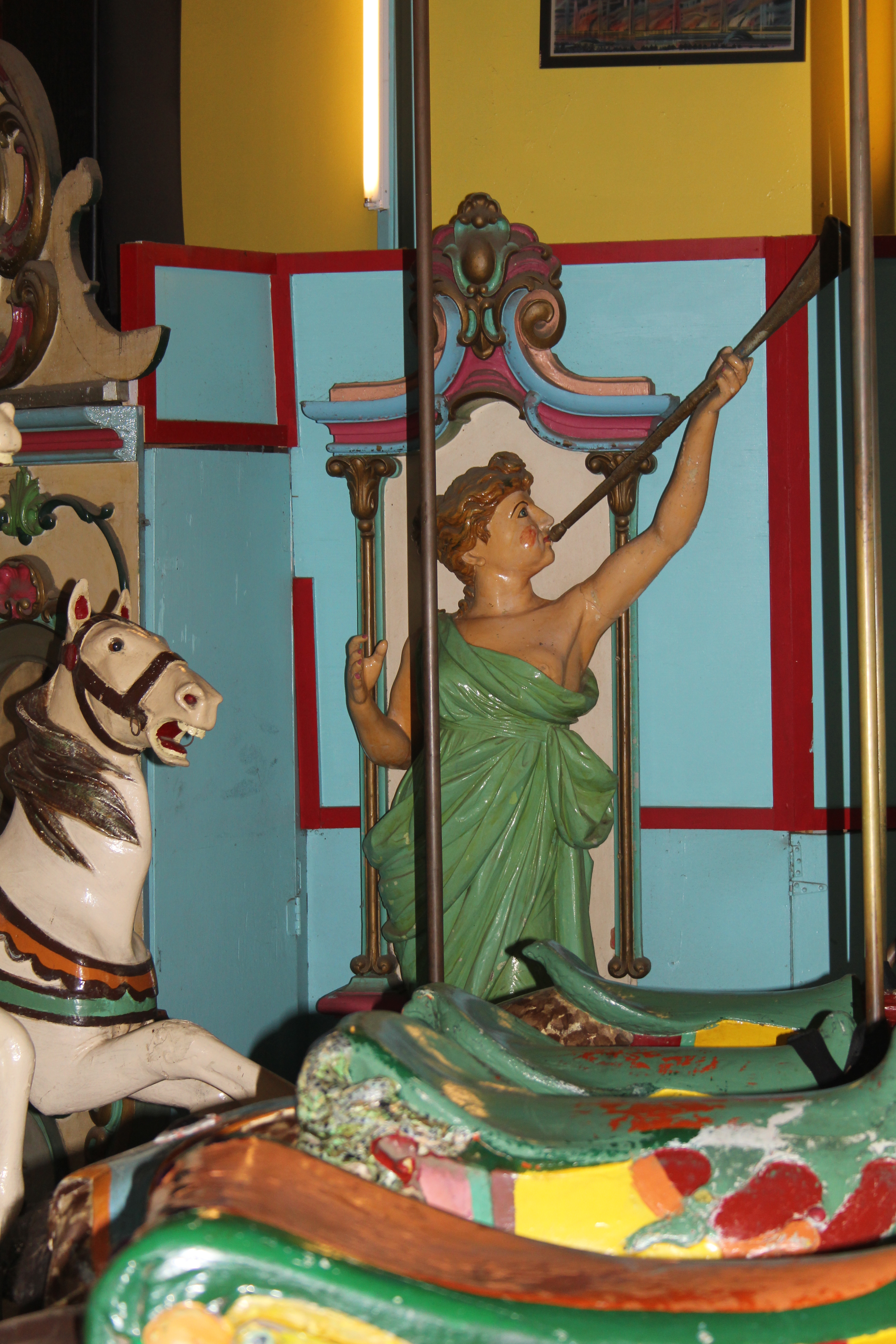
This figure graces the inner section near the calliope.

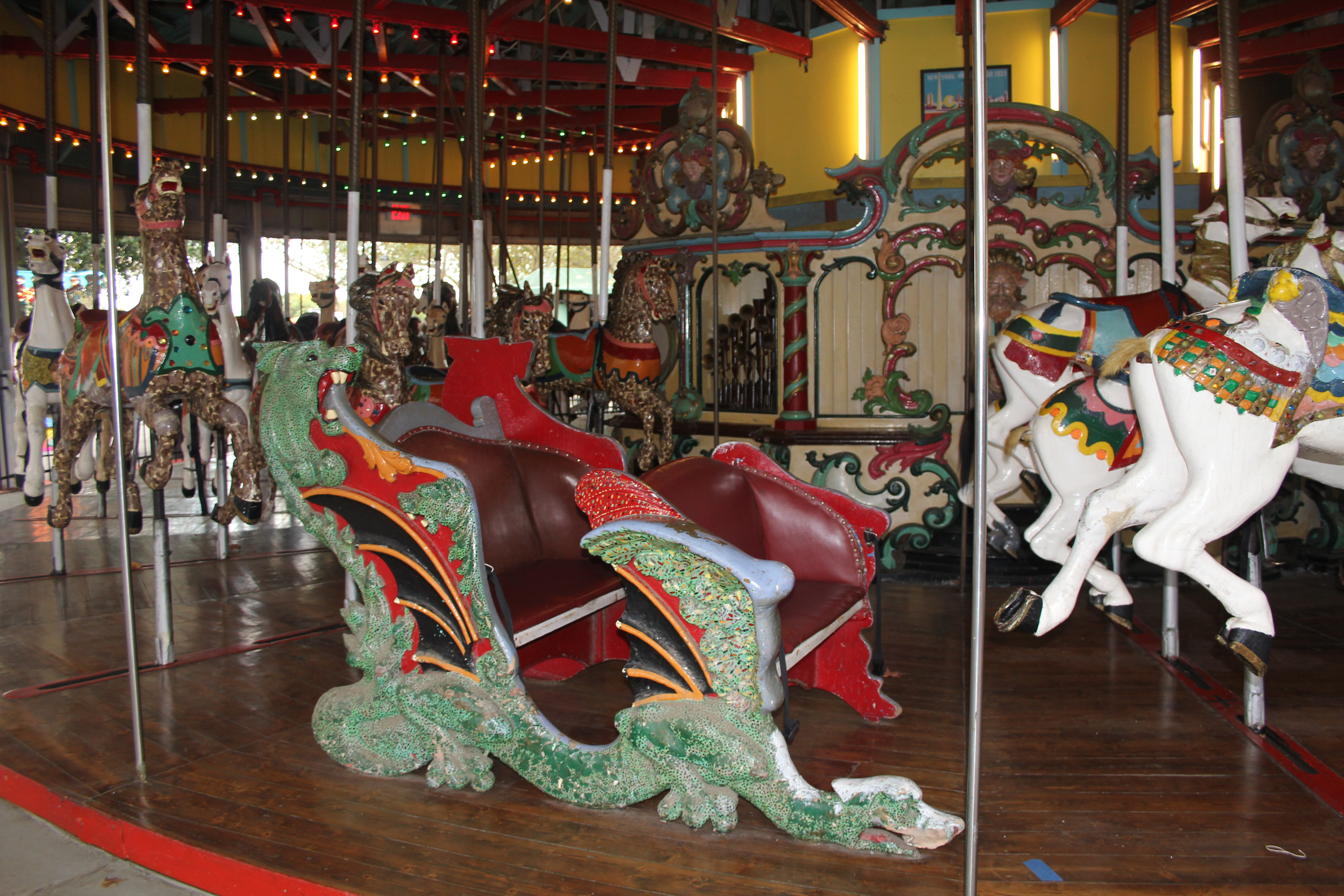
Dragon figures around the coach and elaborately ornamented center section.

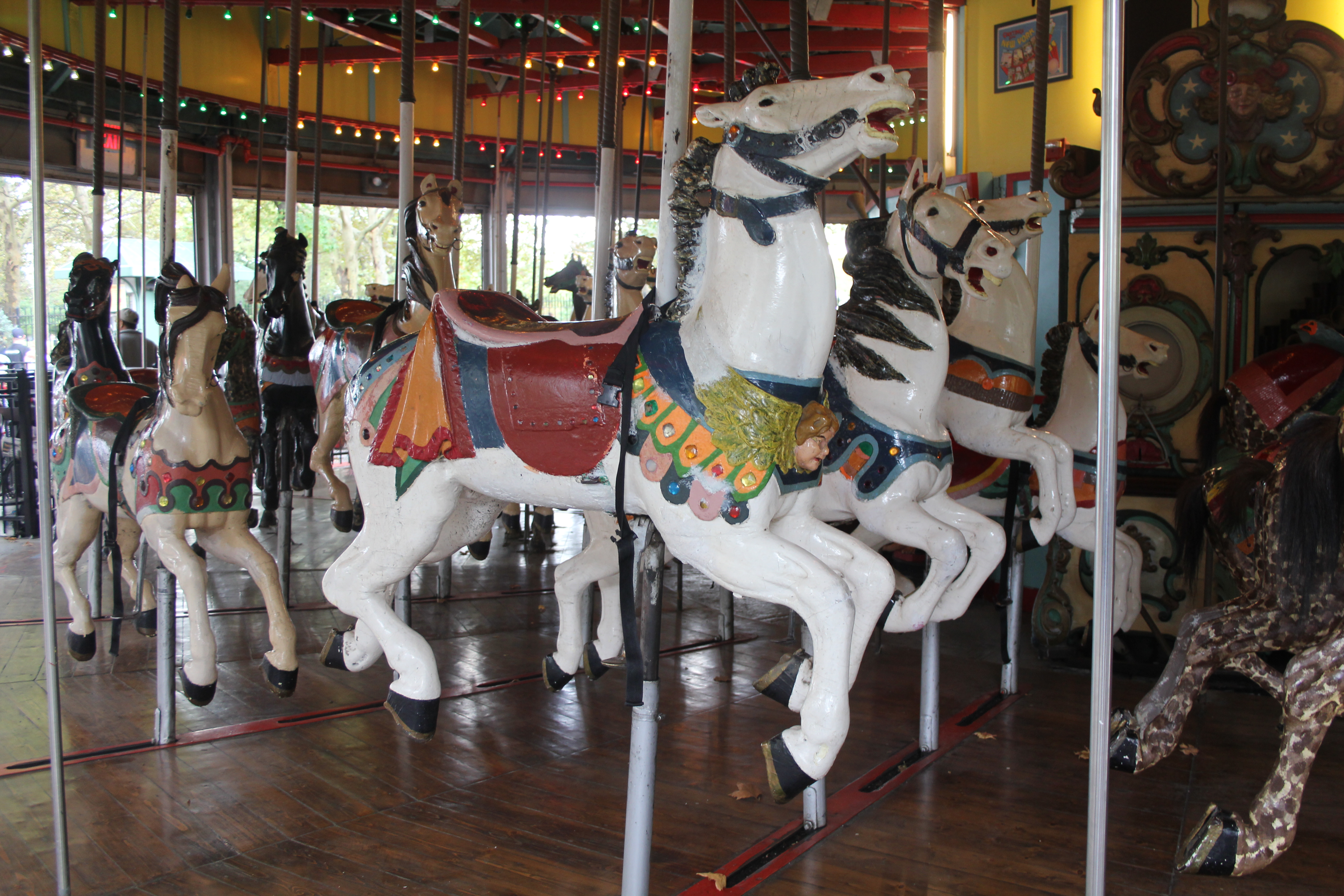
Note the human figure on the horse's chest.

== See also ==
- Amusement rides on the National Register of Historic Places
- B&B Carousell, another NRHP-listed carousel with Illions horses, located on Coney Island
- National Register of Historic Places listings in Queens County, New York
