= Hong Kong Dragon Boat Festival in New York =

Cultural event in New York City, United States

Coordinates: 40.735°N 73.840°W

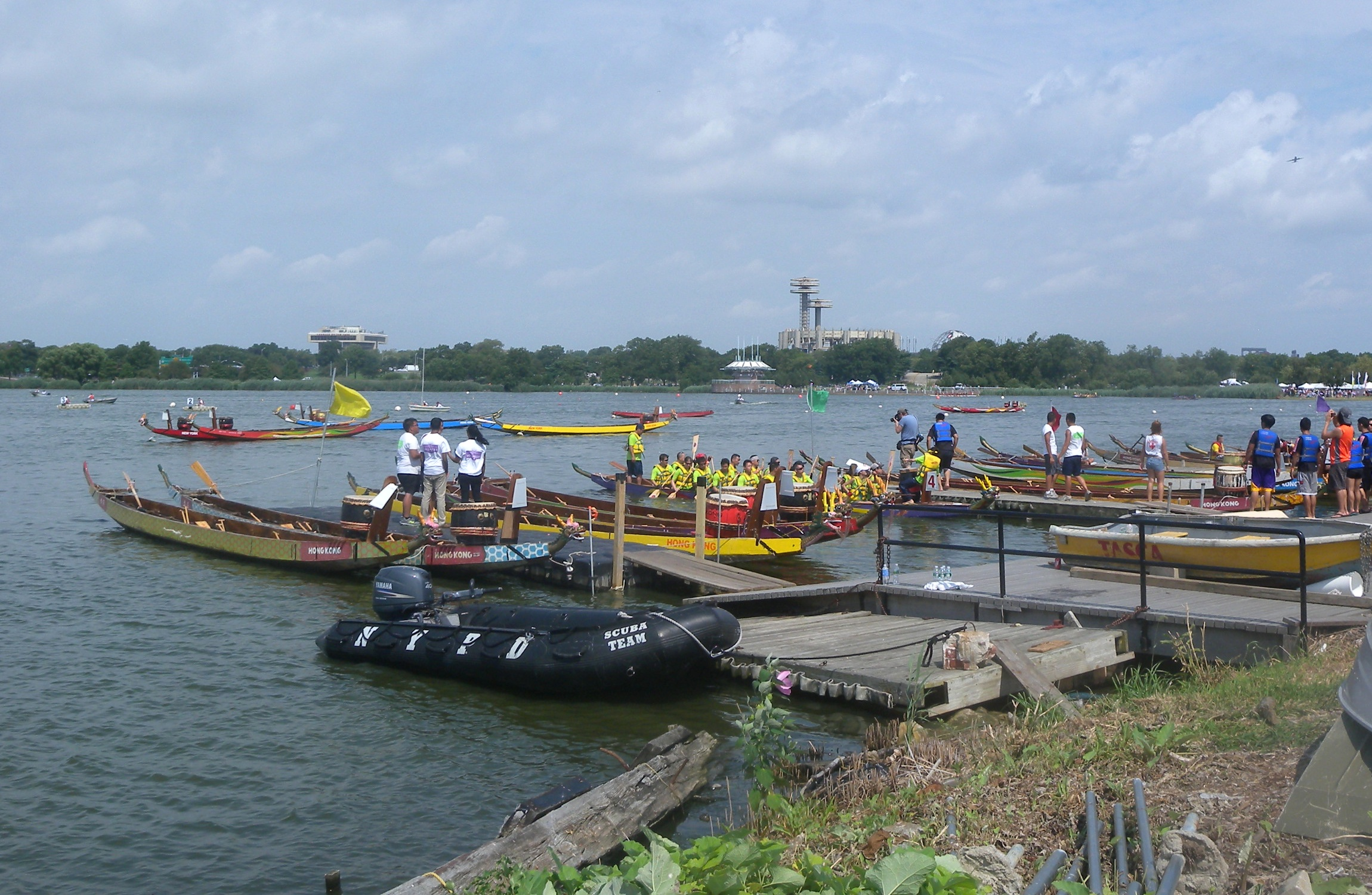
Preparing to launch

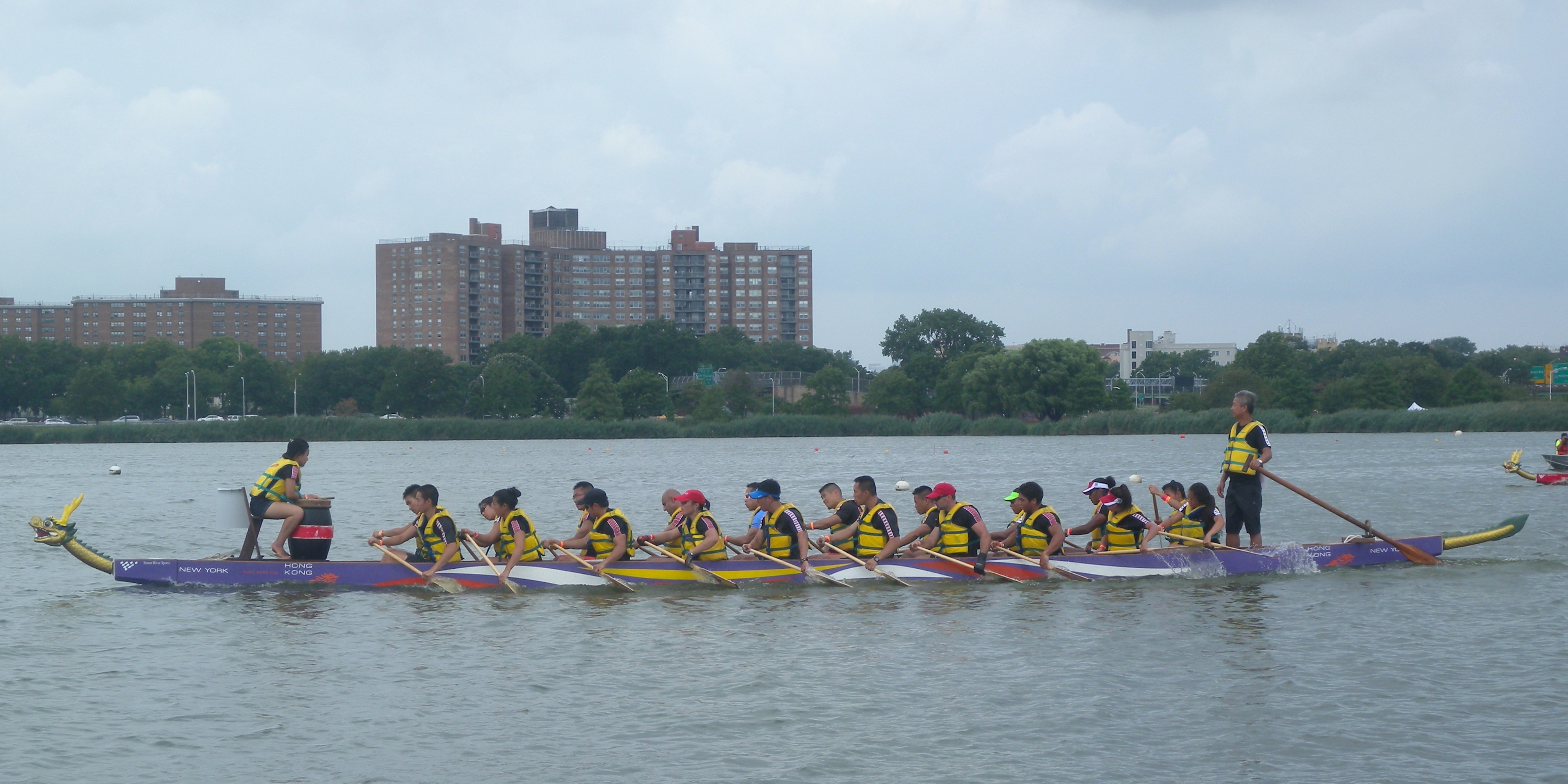
Paddling toward the start

Attractions and geographical features of Flushing Meadows–Corona Park
Attractions and geographical features of Flushing Meadows–Corona Park:
1 Citi Field
2 Etihad Park (under construction)
3 Flushing Meadows Carousel and Queens Zoo
4 Flushing Meadows Corona Park Aquatics Center
5 Flushing River and Creek
6 Meadow Lake and Hong Kong Dragon Boat Festival
7 Metropolitan Park (proposed) and Shea Stadium (demolished)
8 Mets–Willets Point subway station
9 Mets–Willets Point LIRR station
10 National Tennis Center and United States Pavilion (demolished)
11 New York Hall of Science
12 New York State Pavilion and Queens Theatre
13 Queens Botanical Garden
14 Queens Museum
15 Queens Night Market
16 Terrace on the Park
17 Unisphere
18 Willow Lake
19 World's Fair subway station (demolished)

The Hong Kong Dragon Boat Festival in New York is an annual sporting and multicultural event held in August at Meadow Lake in Flushing Meadows–Corona Park in the New York City borough of Queens to celebrate the fifth moon (or the fifth month) of the lunar calendar. In addition to providing audiences with traditional Chinese foods and performances, the festival, now in its 18th year, hosts over 150 dragon boat teams from across North America, making it one of the largest dragon boat festivals in the United States. Depending on the competitive division, teams compete for cash prizes or airline tickets.

In 1986, the Hong Kong Tourism Board donated traditional teak wood boats to several cities including New York. In 1990, the locally based Hong Kong Economic and Trade Office promoted and organized the inaugural Hong Kong Dragon Boat Festival in New York, which was held on the Hudson River in Battery Park City. Several of the original organizers are still involved with the festival, including Henry Wan, who now serves as the festival's chairman.

The festival is now an independent non-profit company organized under the laws of the State of New York and receives its funding through sponsorships by various companies. The Hong Kong Economic and Trade Office continues to be a substantial supporter of the festival.

In addition to the change in corporate structure, the festival's fleet of dragon boats has grown from 4 teak wood dragon boats to over 30 dragon boats. Many of the boats are made of fiberglass. All the boats are approved by the International Dragon Boat Federation for international dragon boat racing.
