= New York City Police Academy =

- Active: 1964–present
- Country: United States
- Agency: New York City Police Department
- Type: Police academy
- Part of: NYPD Training Bureau
- Headquarters: College Point, Queens, New York City, New York, U.S. 40°46′19″N 73°50′23″W

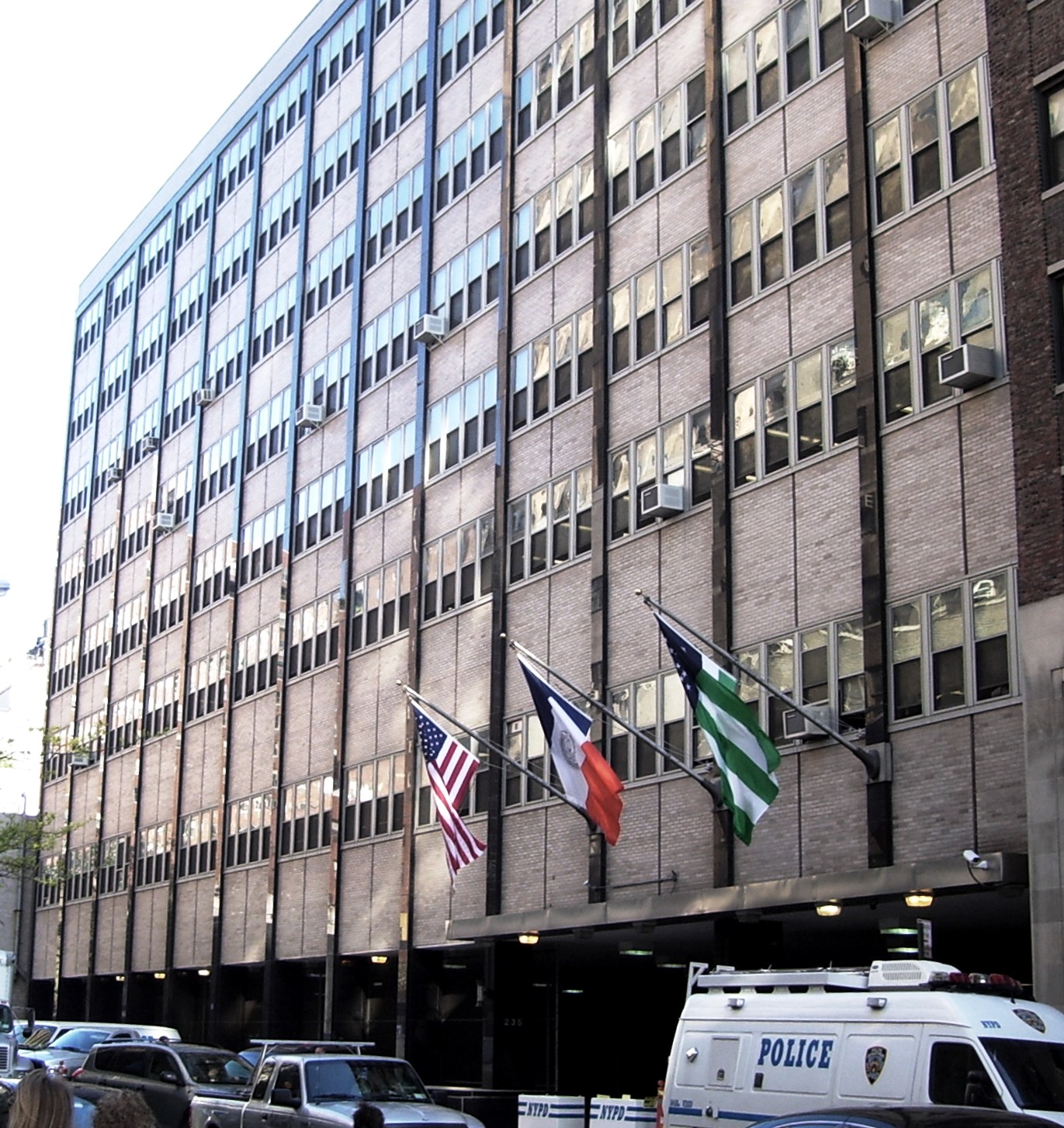
The old NYPD Police Academy, East 20th Street, Manhattan. The building now is home to the NYPD's Candidate Assessment Center.

The New York City Police Academy is the police academy of the New York City Police Department (NYPD). It is located in College Point, Queens.

Within the organization of the New York City Police Department, the Chief of Training oversees the Training Bureau, which includes the Police Academy, the NYPD Cadet Corps, and other units.

== History ==
The old Police Academy opened in 1964 and was located at 235 East 20th Street in Manhattan, in the Gramercy Park area. Within 25 years, however, the facility was regarded as antiquated and obsolete, and no longer had capacity for larger classes of police trainees. Jeremy Travis (then the special counsel to the police commissioner, and years later the president of the John Jay College of Criminal Justice) urged construction of a new facility in 1985.

In 1989, Mayor Edward I. Koch promised a new facility to be located in the South Bronx, and in 1992, during the mayoralty of David N. Dinkins, architects were chosen and plans were released. However, Mayor Rudolph W. Giuliani canceled the plans for a new facility. In 2007, plans for a new police training center were revived under Mayor Michael R. Bloomberg and Police Commissioner Raymond W. Kelly, with the new facility to be located on a 35-acre tract in College Point, Queens, that previously housed a police tow parking lot owned by the city. Seven other locations, including the decommissioned Flushing Airport, the Seaview Hospital and Farm Colony in Staten Island, and Floyd Bennett Field in Brooklyn, were considered before the College Point site was ultimately chosen. Groundbreaking officially occurred in December 2009. Phase One opened in December 2015.

After the NYPD moved its academy to Queens, the fate of the old academy building was initially unclear. In 2008 and 2013, local residents and Manhattan Community Board 6 pushed to convert the eight-story building into a public school. In October 2016, however, the NYPD opened its Candidate Assessment Center in the old building; the center recruits applicants to join the police department.

== Description ==
The new facility is located at 130-30 28th Avenue, was constructed at a cost of $950 million, and has three buildings with a combined 730,000 square feet of space. It is not easily accessible by public transit; the closest New York City Subway station, Flushing–Main Street, is more than one mile away. Perkins & Will, Tactical Design, and Michael Fieldman were the project's architects, and Turner and STV were the construction managers.

The three buildings at the academy are a classroom and office building (eight stories, with an atrium, cafeteria, auditorium, and library); a "physical and tactical training" building, including a large gymnasium and swimming pool; and a central utilities plant. The training facilities include simulated locations, such as a mock subway station, mock courthouses, and mock precinct houses. The main police academy site does not include a firing range (the NYPD range is located at Rodman's Neck in the Bronx), nor is the facility used for driving instruction (NYPD officers train in driving at Floyd Bennett Field).
