= Flushing Airport =

Airport in New York City (1929–1984)

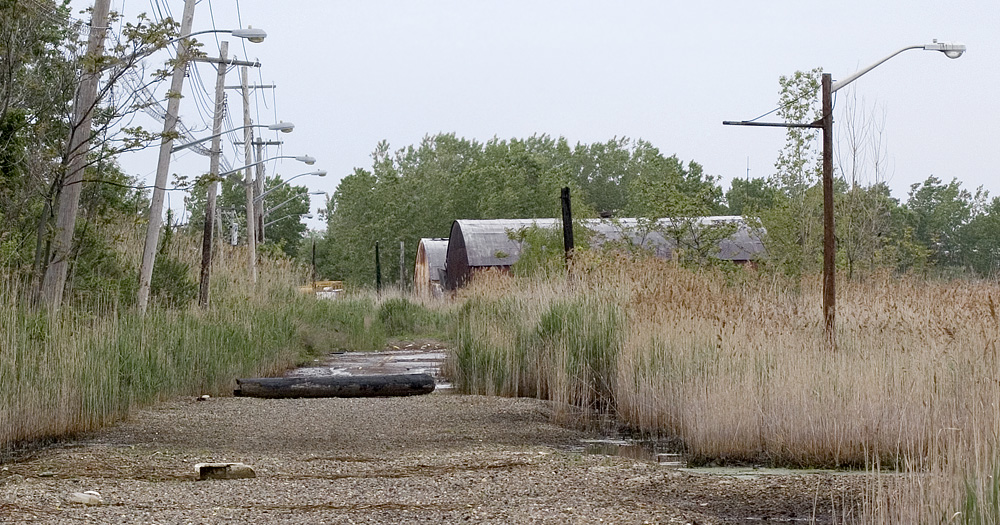
- Deserted road to Flushing Airport hangars (demolished 2008)
- IATA: FLU; ICAO: KFLU; FAA LID: FLU

Summary
- Airport type: Defunct
- Owner: New York City Economic Development Corporation
- Serves: New York metropolitan area
- Location: College Point, Queens, New York City
- Opened: May 1929
- Closed: 1984
- Elevation AMSL: 5 ft (1.5 m)
- Coordinates: 40°46′45″N 073°50′00″W

Map
- Interactive map of Flushing Airport

Flushing Airport (IATA: FLU, ICAO: KFLU, FAA LID: FLU) was an airfield in northern Queens in New York City. It was located in the neighborhood of College Point, near Flushing. The airfield operated from 1929 to 1984.

== History ==
Flushing Airport was constructed atop 250 acres (100 ha) of wetlands beginning in 1927. George J. Brown of Amityville financially funded its construction, and Thomas E. Donovan managed its construction. The airport opened two years later, in May 1929. At the time, it was the last privately owned airfield in Queens. Pioneer Aero Trades School moved its operations from Roosevelt Field to Flushing Airport.

The airport quickly became one of the main airports in the New York City area. It was originally called Speed's Airport and was one of the busiest airports in New York City before the emergence of the larger LaGuardia Airport (which opened in 1939).

In the early 1970s a skywriting company operated there. Without space for expansion, the airport became very crowded as time passed. In 1977, a Piper Twin Comanche crashed shortly after taking off, killing those on board. This incident, as well as frequent flooding, led to the closing of this airport in 1984.

The airport has largely reverted to wetland; its only outlet is Mill Creek, a tributary of the Flushing River and Flushing Bay. Several underground pipes, as well as man-made drainage ditches on the New York City Police Academy campus and north of 28th Avenue, carry Mill Creek from the airport to the Flushing River. Since the outbreak of West Nile virus in New York in the late 1990s, the land has received frequent mosquito larvicide spraying.

As of 2000, Flushing Airport still had its air corridor reserved under FAA regulations. A company called Airships Unlimited has been lobbying to convert the abandoned airport into a "blimp port," citing the fact that Goodyear Blimps used this airport in the 1960s. The benefit of this plan would be to preserve the air corridor for Flushing Airport. In 2004, the Bloomberg administration proposed rezoning the area for commercial development as part of the already existing College Point Corporate Park. However, the plan has met significant protests from the local residents who fear such zoning would bring too much traffic to the area. The proposal has since been deferred.

Work on extending Linden Place through the former airport began in 2008. The street was supposed to have been completed in 2010, but it did not open to the public until 2015. During the construction of the Linden Place extension, local residents expressed concerns about polluted soil within the airport site. The next phase of Linden Place's extension, between 23rd and 20th avenues, began in 2019 after the New York City Economic Development Corporation (NYCEDC) fixed drainage issues along the road's right-of-way. The NYCEDC also began pollution remediation of the airport site in 2023. In November 2024, the NYCEDC launched a request for proposals for the redevelopment of the Flushing Airport site. Mayor Eric Adams announced plans in July 2025 to construct 3,000 apartments on the airport's site, preserving 60 acres (24 ha) as open space.

== See also ==
- Floyd Bennett Field, another former civilian airport in Southeast Brooklyn
