= Kissena Creek =

Buried stream in Queens, New York

Coordinates: 40°44′59″N 73°49′33″W

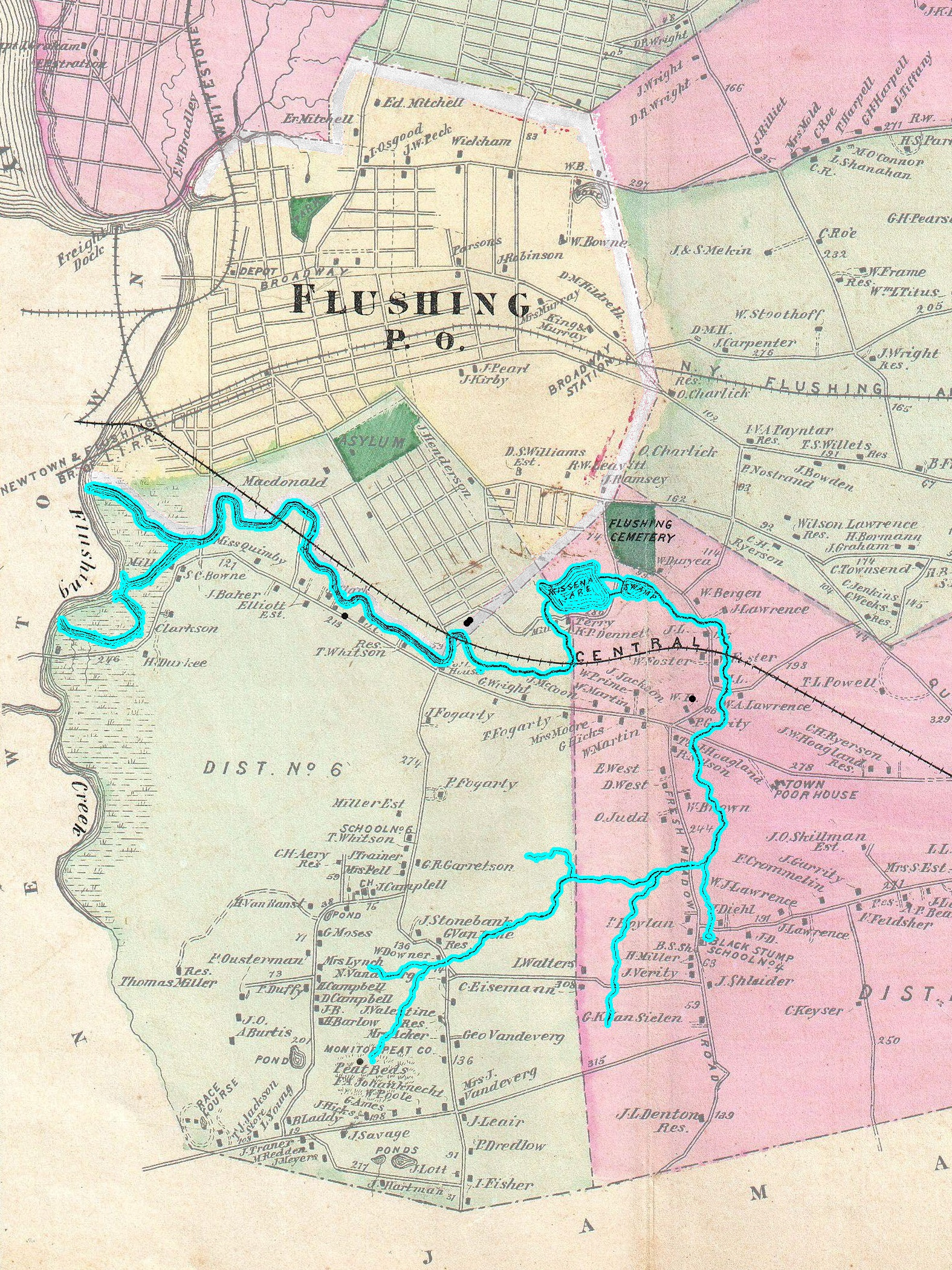
An 1873 map of Queens showing the route of Kissena Creek (blue) and the Central Railroad.

Kissena Creek (also Mill Creek or Ireland Mill Creek) is a buried stream located in the neighborhoods of Flushing, Fresh Meadows, Hillcrest, and Kew Gardens Hills in the New York City borough of Queens. Kissena Creek originates in a now-filled swamp within Kew Gardens Hills and Pomonok in central Queens, flowing east to Hillcrest. The creek then travels mostly north and west, largely flowing beneath Kissena Park Golf Course, Kissena Park, Kissena Corridor Park, and Queens Botanical Garden, before merging with the Flushing River in Flushing Meadows–Corona Park.

The name "Kissena" comes from the Chippewa language term for "it is cold", "cold place", or "cool water". Much of the creek was covered or diverted into sewers in the 20th century, and the only extant above-ground portion of the creek is Kissena Lake in Kissena Park.

== Headwaters ==
The creek, also known historically as Mill Creek or Ireland Mill Creek, begins at what was formerly a swamp in the modern Kew Gardens Hills and Pomonok areas. The swamp was variously known as "Peat Bog Swamp", "Old Crow Swamp", "Doughty's Swamp", and "Gutman's Swamp". The 140-acre (57 ha) swamp was bound by Vleigh Place near Main Street to its west, and Kissena Boulevard and Parsons Boulevard to the east. When Parsons and Kissena Boulevards were laid out as the combined "Jamaica and Flushing Road", the route curved around the north edge of the swamp. The curve later became known as "Dead Man's Bend", due to the frequent accidents that would appear there, until a bypass was made by extending Kissena Boulevard southeast to Parsons Boulevard. The original alignment between Kissena and Parsons Boulevards remains as the two-block Aguilar Avenue.

In the late 19th century, the swamp served as a source for peat, a fossil fuel related to coal that forms from decayed plant matter. As Kew Gardens Hills gradually developed, the swamp shrunk in size with the street grid resting on top of it. The swamp was completely drained by 1918, except for a small section under a barn, whose owner had bought the barn from the city government and moved it to the swamp's "easement area". The last remaining section of the swamp, covering 23 acres (9.3 ha), remained undeveloped through the end of the 20th century. Lander College for Men was built on the site in 2000, while Opal Apartments was developed in 2004.

== Fresh Meadows ==
Past the swamp, the creek travels east parallel to 72nd Avenue. It turns north in modern Fresh Meadows, at the site of Francis Lewis High School, then travels parallel to today's Utopia Parkway to the modern Kissena Park Golf Course, just south of Flushing Cemetery. The creek runs under Fresh Meadow Lane, which forms the Kissena Park Golf Course's eastern border, and then turns westward underneath the golf course's northern border.

A tributary flowed northward from a kettle pond in present-day Utopia Playground and merged with the main creek at Utopia Parkway. The pond was located at the junction of Fresh Meadow Lane and 73rd Avenue, which was known as Black Stump Road. This road took its name from a local landmark along current Fresh Meadows Lane: the remnants of a large tree that had burned after being struck by lightning, and that was known as the "Black Stump". The kettle pond was infilled in 1941.

== Kissena Park ==
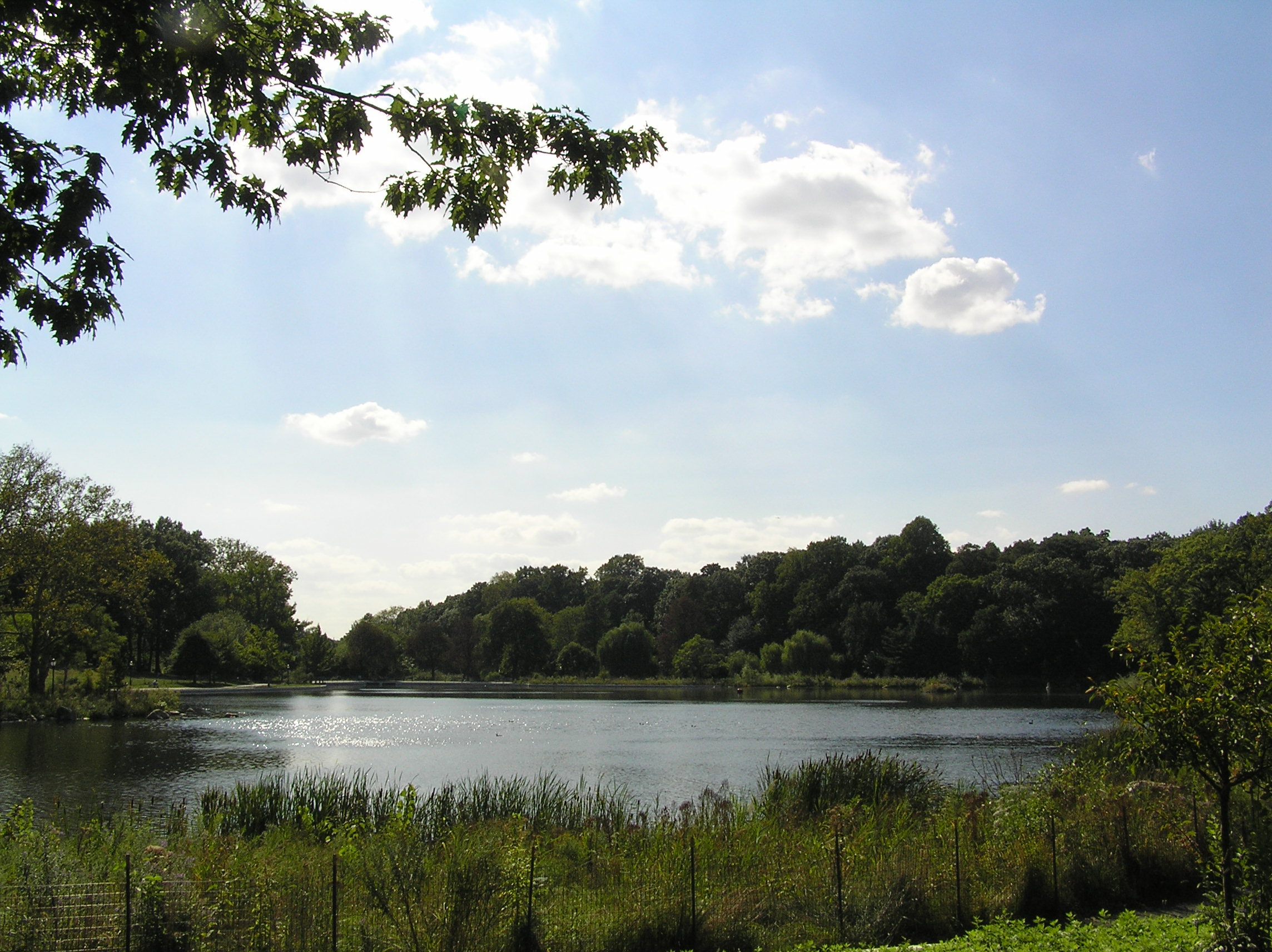
Kissena Lake

The creek then turns west and flows into Kissena Lake. Located at the northwestern corner of Kissena Park, Kissena Lake is fed by the creek and was also fed by a smaller stream from the north that has since been buried with a playground built on top. In its center is a bird sanctuary isle constructed following the lake's most recent restoration in 2003. The name of the lake, park, and creek comes from the Chippewa language meaning "it is cold", "cold place", or "cool water".

The site of Flushing Meadows–Corona Park, slightly west of Kissena Park, was originally part of the ancestral path of the Hudson River, and the present-day Kissena Lake was located on the eastern shore of the river. A glacier covered much of Long Island, where Queens is located, and formed a terminal moraine through the center of the island. When the glacier receded, it created several recesses in the land; some of these recesses, such as Kissena Lake, were filled with water. The lake was used as an ice skating and ice harvesting site for much of the 19th century. Its use as a recreational site led the city to purchase land around it for a park in 1906. The glaciation also created a natural source of well water for the area.

Originally, the western end of Kissena Lake drained into the creek and was traversed by a bridge, similar to Central Park's Gapstow Bridge. Kissena Lake was dredged in 1942 as part of a Works Progress Administration initiative. This transformed Kissena Lake into a "bathtub lake" with a concrete shoreline. Prior to the renovation, Kissena Lake was part of a wetland, which was believed to be a worthless type of land during the 20th century. Lacking natural aeration and warmed by its shallower depth and concrete shoreline, the lake suffered a buildup of algae. This necessitated another restoration project, which was undertaken in 1983. In 2003, a $2.3 million restoration drained the lake in stages, resulting in its current appearance. The city water was replaced with well water, an aeration system was installed, the concrete bulkheads were replaced with natural-looking materials such as rocks and plants, and a small island for birds and turtles was built within the lake.

== Kissena Corridor Park ==
Located underneath Kissena Park and the western portion of Kissena Corridor Park is the Kissena Corridor Sewer. The combined sewer receives water from as far east as Little Neck, near New York City's border with Nassau County. It was adapted from the path of Kissena Creek, which had been gradually diverted into the sewer during the mid-20th century. In 1934, the creek was placed in a culvert at its crossing with Main Street (then called Jagger Avenue), as part of a widening project for the street.

The Kissena Corridor project was initiated in the 1930s as a greenbelt to link several parks in eastern Queens. It included the construction of a major storm sewer through the corridor, which the Parks Department said was necessitated as a result of "the great extent of this natural drainage basin." In 1942, the federal War Production Board barred the construction of the Corridor Sewer, due to steel requirements for the World War II effort. Groundbreaking ceremonies for the sewer project were held on April 1, 1947, at the intersection of Lawrence Street and Fowler and Blossom Avenues, near the modern-day Queens Botanical Garden west of Kissena Park. On February 19, 1948, the final contract for the project, including the trunk line from 188th Street to Francis Lewis Boulevard, was authorized from the Board of Estimate. Eight days later, the Queens borough sewer engineer announced that the cost of the sewer project would run to over $10,000,000, $2.25 million higher than the previous figure. The main trunk of the Corridor Sewer was completed by September 1948, although many of the feeder lines had yet to be constructed.

The western stretch of Kissena Corridor Park was landfilled in the 1950s from dirt excavated for the construction of the Long Island Expressway. Prior to the filling operations, the creek was still visible within the western portion of the park, and occasionally caused flooding in the surrounding neighborhoods. By 1960, about 550,000 cubic yards (420,000 m^{3}) of dirt were deposited on the park from the Long Island Expressway. Additionally, in 1959, New York City parks commissioner Robert Moses had announced that more fill would come from the Clearview Expressway, which would raise the grade of the park and end garbage landfilling.

== Queens Botanical Garden ==
The sewers from Kissena Corridor Park flow west through the Queens Botanical Garden. From there, the sewers cross College Point Boulevard and enter the Flushing Bay Combined Sewer Outfall (CSO) Retention Facility, located in Flushing Meadows underneath the Al Oerter Recreation Center. The facility can hold up to 43.4 million US gallons (164 Ml) of water from overflows during storms, before pumping the water to the Tallman Island Waste Water Treatment Plant in College Point. Otherwise, the water empties into the Flushing River (also known as Flushing Creek). The Flushing River flows north into Flushing Bay, part of the East River, which in turn is an arm of the Atlantic Ocean. Formerly, Kissena Creek flowed from the Botanical Garden site directly into Flushing Meadows, merging with the Flushing River near the site of the present-day Fountain of the Planets.

Prior to the 1964−1965 New York World's Fair, the western portion of Kissena Corridor Park between Lawrence Street/College Point Boulevard and Main Street adjacent to Flushing Meadows Park was leased to the World's Fair Corporation, along with most of Flushing Meadows. In 1961, as part of $3 million in development for the World's Fair, the Queens Botanical Garden was planned to be relocated from the fair grounds in Flushing Meadows to the west end of Kissena Corridor Park adjacent to the World's Fair Grounds. This site was originally planned to be used as parking space for the fair. Instead, the Queens Botanical Garden was built, and it was dedicated on October 19, 1963.

The QBG's 2001 Master Plan included the construction of a self-sustaining ecosystem. The plan consisted of a stream forming from rainwater collected atop the roof of its administration building, flowing through pools towards a wetland at the garden's western edge. Runoff collected in the garden's parking lot and other locations would also contribute to the stream. Part of the stream follows the path of Kissena Creek.

== Sources ==
- Feller, Michael (December 1988). "Kissena Park: The Wild Side; A Guide to its Natural Areas" (PDF). New York City Department of Parks and Recreation, Natural Resources Group.
- "Flushing Bay Facility Plan Report" (PDF). New York City Department of Environmental Protection.
- Kadinsky, Sergey (2016). Hidden Waters of New York City: A History and Guide to 101 Forgotten Lakes, Ponds, Creeks, and Streams in the Five Boroughs. New York, NY: Countryman Press. ISBN 978-1-58157-566-8.
- "Preparation of the Site for the World's Fair 1964–1965: Supplementary Report" (PDF). City of New York. April 18, 1960.
