= Museum of the Peaceful Arts =

Coordinates: 40°45′00″N 73°58′24″W

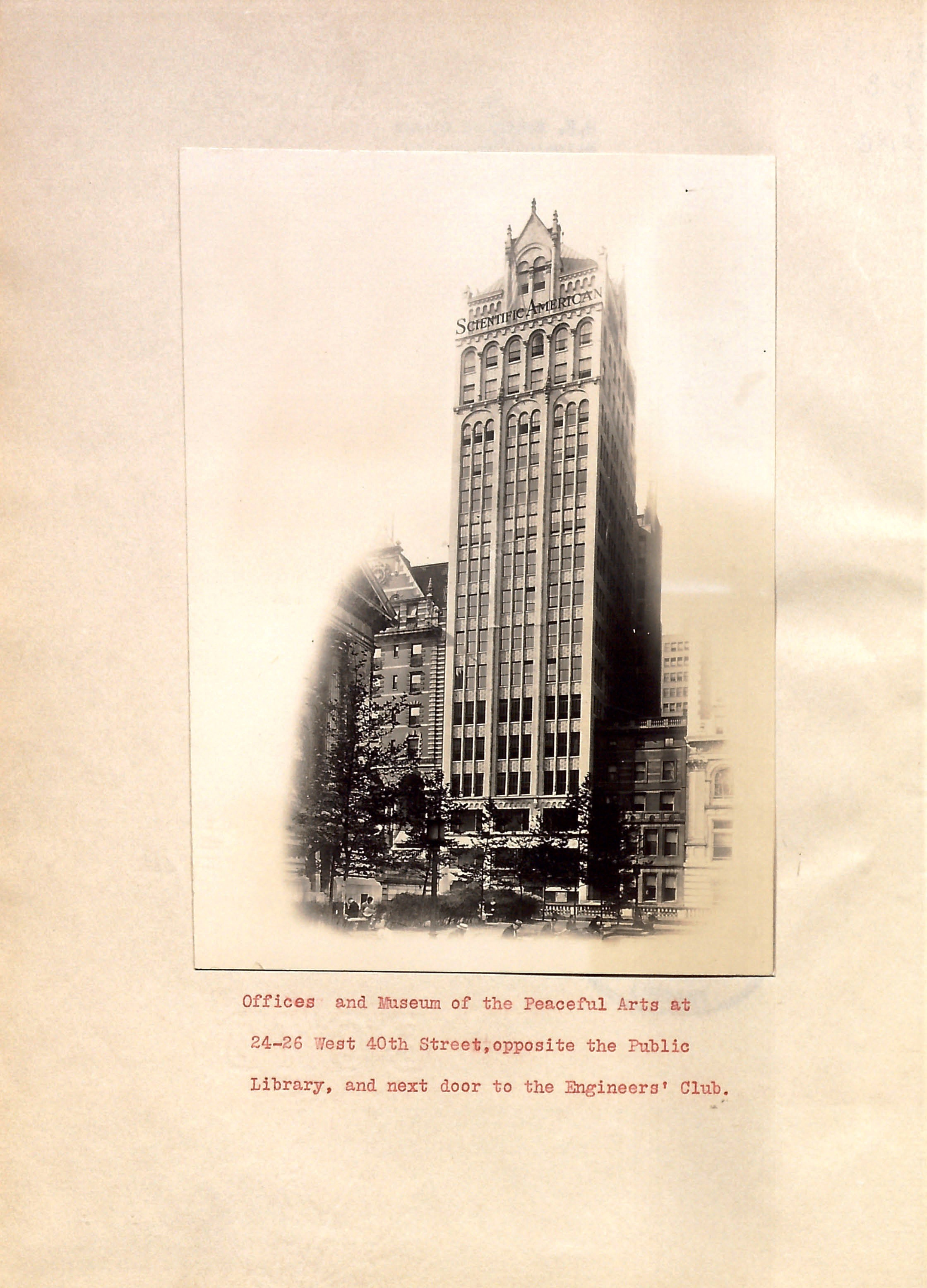
Manhattan location of the headquarters of the Museum of the Peaceful Arts

The Museum of the Peaceful Arts was a museum in Manhattan, New York City. Established at 24 West 40th St. around 1920, it was later relocated to the Daily News Building at 220 E. 42nd St. It was later closed, and superseded by the New York Museum of Science and Industry.

== History ==
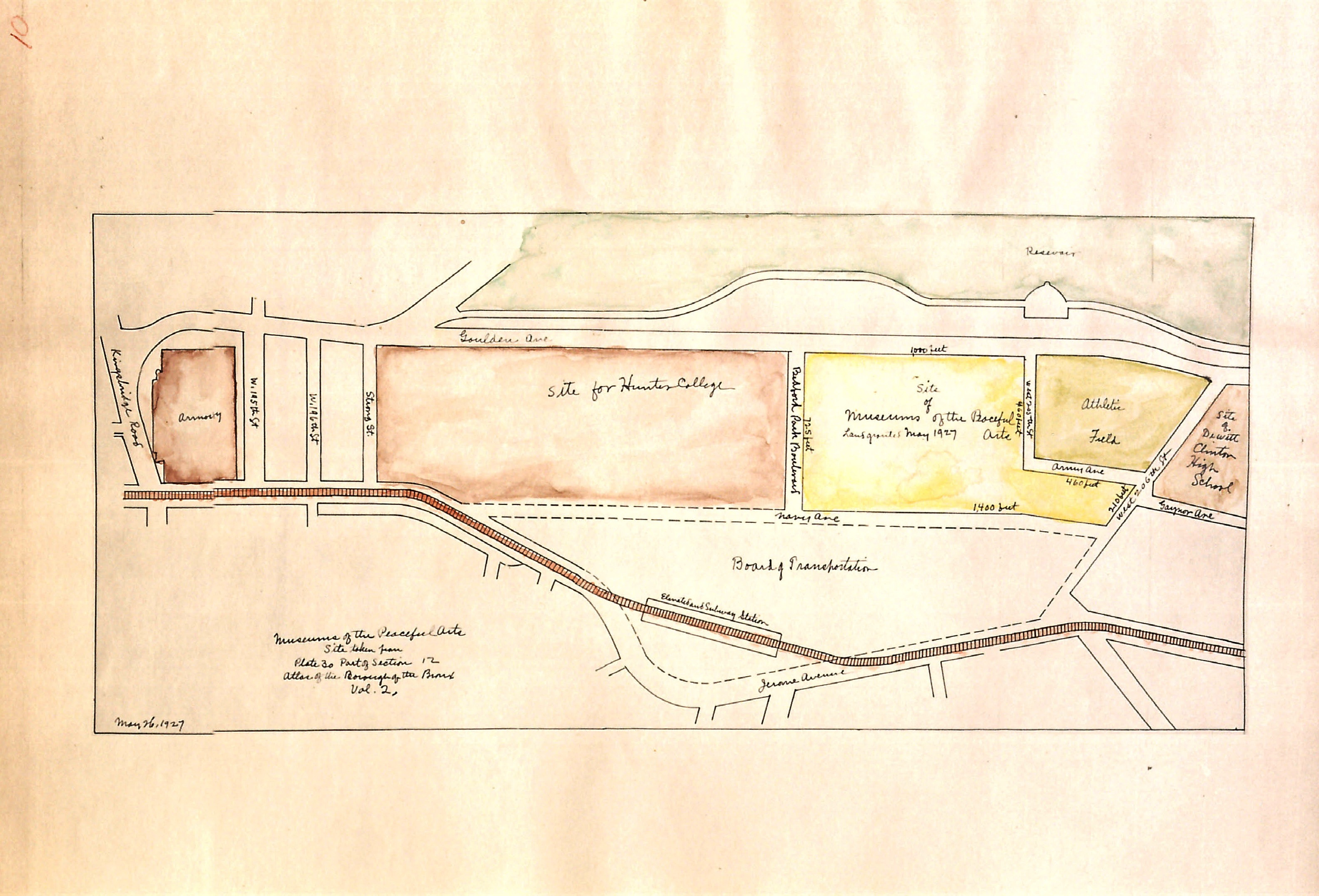
Bronx site plan for the Museum of the Peaceful Arts

The project was originally envisioned as a complex of twenty museums to be located on the west side of Manhattan in Riverside Park, or, according to later plans, near the Jerome Park Reservoir in the Bronx. The original charter shows the scope of the museum system:

The Association for the Establishment and Maintenance FOR the People in the City of New York of Museums OF the Peaceful Arts: This instrument witnesseth That the Regents of the University of the State of New York have granted this charter for the purpose of forming a corporation to establish and maintain as a permanent and useful memorial of the century of peace and amity that has followed the signing of the Treaty of Ghent on Christmas Eve, 1814, in the City of New York, and for the people thereof, and for the benefit of the citizens of the State of New York and of the United States generally, buildings which shall be devoted to the housing and proper exposition of permanent exhibits in the following branches, among others, of the industrial and peaceful arts: (a) Electricity (b) Steam (c) Astronomy and Navigation (d) Safety appliances (e) Aviation (f) Mechanical Arts (g) Agriculture (h) Mining (i) Labor (J) Efficiency (k) Historic Records (1) Health and Hygiene (m) Textiles (n) Ceramics and Clays (o) Architecture (P) Scenic Embellishment (q) Gardening (r) Roads and Road Building materials (s) Commerce and Trade (t) Printing and Books and with the further purpose and power to establish and to maintain a library building which shall contain books and periodicals giving information in respect of the subjects covered by the various museums; to erect and to maintain a building containing an auditorium for purposes of popular assembly, with contiguous rooms for committee meetings, lectures, and the various purposes incident to the operation of such a group of museums; to perform all the functions pertaining to the maintenance and operation of museums and concomitant institutions relating in any way to the development of the peaceful arts and progress in industrial education; and to open the museums, the library and the assembly rooms for the uses of the schools, the colleges and the universities of the City and State of New York, and, in particular, to bring about the creation of such a museum institution as shall be of greatest utility and advantage to the people of the City, State and Nation in the fostering and furtherance of commercial and industrial education."

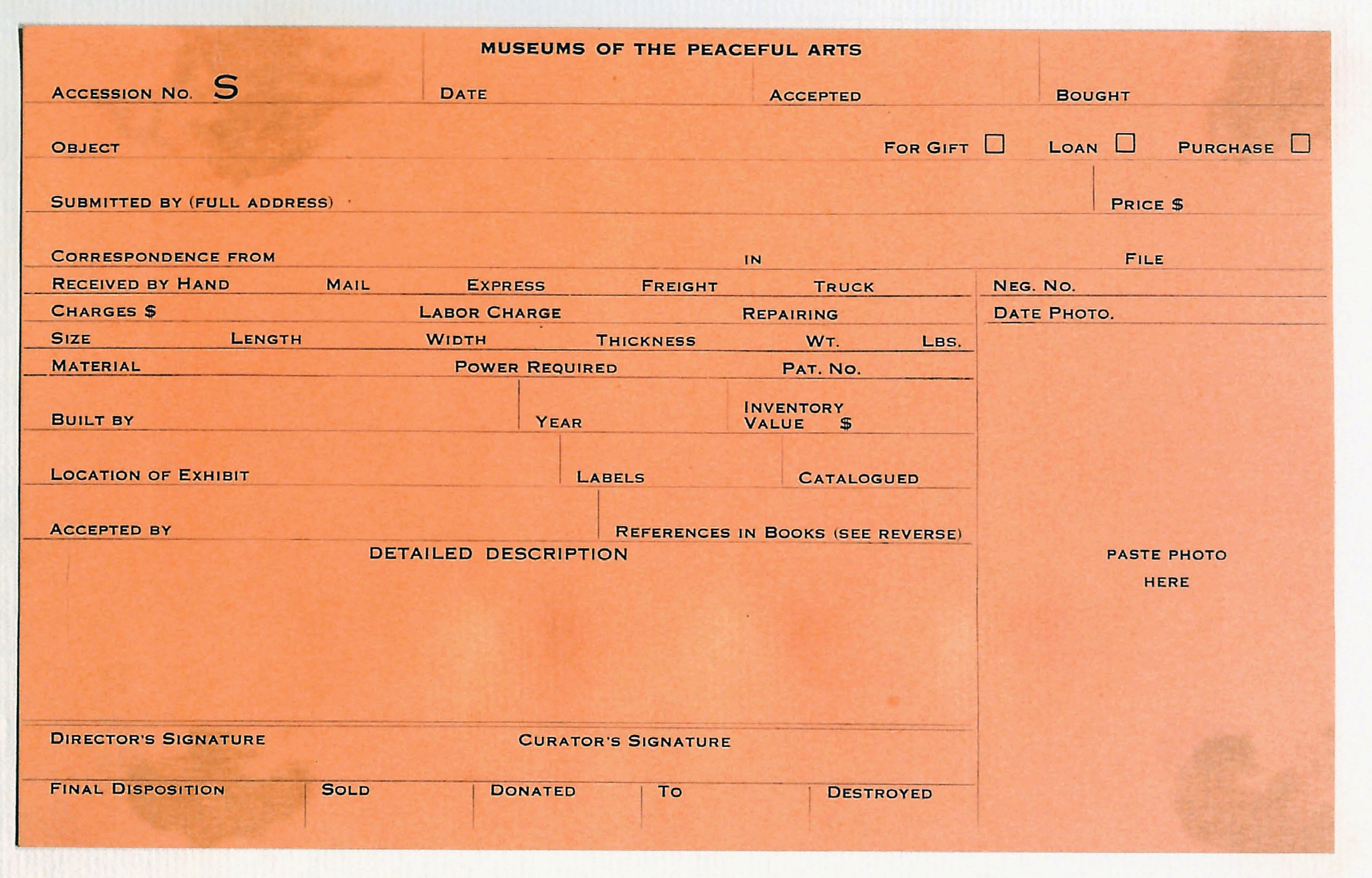
Accession form for the Museum of the Peaceful Arts

George Frederick Kunz proposed the organization of an entirely new museum, the "Museum of the Peaceful Arts" or the "Museums of the Peaceful Arts." As there are museums dedicated to science, war and industry, this would be one devoted to the study and exhibition of the peaceful arts. "Mr. Julius Rosenwald's industrial museum gift paralleled the $2,500,000.00 bequest of the late Henry R. Towne, lock and hardware man, to New York for a Museum of Peaceful Arts. Mr. Towne had been interested in such a museum by Dr. George F. Kunz, mineralogist and gem expert, an honorary fellow of the American Museum of Natural History, who has visited every world's fair since the Philadelphia Centennial Exposition in 1876. Announcement of the Towne bequest sent experts in agriculture, animal industry, mining and metallurgy, transportation, engineering, aeronautics, etc., etc., flocking to Europe to study exhibits in such places as the German Museum in Munich, which contains replicas or originals of epochal contrivances, including James Watt's first steam engine, Diesel's oil-compression engine, Dunlop's original tires. The findings of these experts will assist Chicago's industrialists as well as New York's, in assembling a record of material ascendancy of mankind, a record that is to be made practical rather than theoretical, with many working models of machinery, to afford inventors an industrial laboratory."

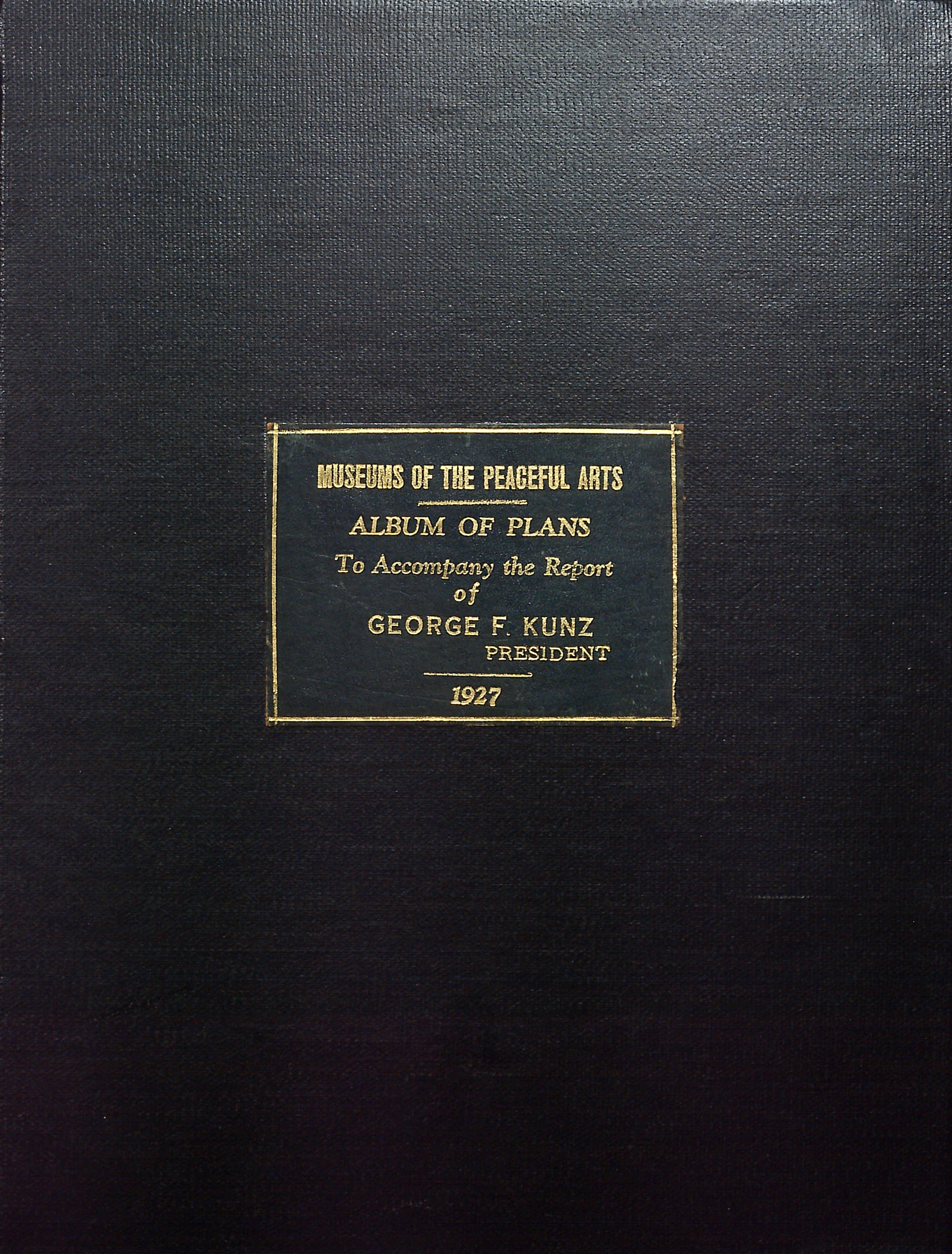
Album of plans to accompany the report of George F. Kunz, president, Museums of the Peaceful Arts, 1927

The museum proved to be successful. The New Yorker had a discussion about it in 1929: "They have unusual machines: Under a microscope you can see how much you can bend a steel rail with the pressure of your finger, a movie shows air currents moving, etc. The collection was started in 1913 by a group of business men. For the last two years it has been in the present museum which is supported, largely, by a bequest of two and a half million dollars from the late Henry F. Towne."

Fay Cluff Brown (1881–1968) was a physicist and inventor who created and supervised the development of educational exhibits, most notably in the Museum of Science and Industry at New York City's Museums of the Peaceful Arts. Much of his scientific research focused on the element selenium. Early in his career, Brown invented a device using selenium, which translated printed text into sound.

Among the items owned by the Museum of the Peaceful Arts was America's first submarine: "Dr. Peter J. Gibbons and his son, Austin Flint Gibbons, who recently bought the old United States submarine boat Holland from junk dealers, yesterday presented the relic in perpetuity to the Association for the Establishment and Maintenance for the People of the City of New York of a Museum of the Peaceful Arts. Dr. George F. Kunz, the expert on gems, President of Tiffany & Co., is President of the new Association."

Several notable inventors of the time were interested in the new museum. Orville Wright wrote to Kunz in May 1925, about giving one of the original Wright airplanes to the museum, and his experiences with other museums:

Dear Mr. Kunz:
The announcement of my intention to send our first airplane to the Kensington Museum brought upon me an avalanche of letters. I am simply swamped with them, so please pardon this delay in answering yours. No one can regret more than I the situation in the Smithsonian Institution which has made it impossible for me to place our first airplane in its care. I have wanted the plane to go to an institution in America which has an historical and educational exhibit of aeronautics, and not to a museum where it would be merely a prominent curiosity. The Smithsonian is the only institution in America which now has such an exhibit. But the Smithsonian has not cared to exhibit our plane of 1903, which was the first to fly, because it would overshadow the 1903 Langley machine, which failed to fly.
When the Smithsonian in 1910 made a request for one of our machines, we suggested that we could furnish the original 1903 plane. We received a request for our 1908 machine. ... The National Museum now has one of our 1909 planes.
I have kept our 1903 machine in my possession, in the hope that conditions in the Smithsonian might change. But after waiting nearly 15 years, and seeing the situation there becoming worse instead of better, I finally offered it to the Kensington Museum. At the time I offered it, I had not heard of the proposed Museum of the Peaceful Arts.
Sincerely,

Orville Wright

In a book on the history of science, George Sarton says: "This museum is quoted here only pro memoria. The idea was originated by George F. Kunz (1856-1932): The projected Museum of the Peaceful Arts (paper read before the American Association of Museums's Meeting, New York, 1912, 12 pages). Great efforts were made to obtain sufficient capital but failed. It was more or less replaced by the New York Museum of Science and Industry. G. Sarton has in his archives a considerable correspondence on this subject."

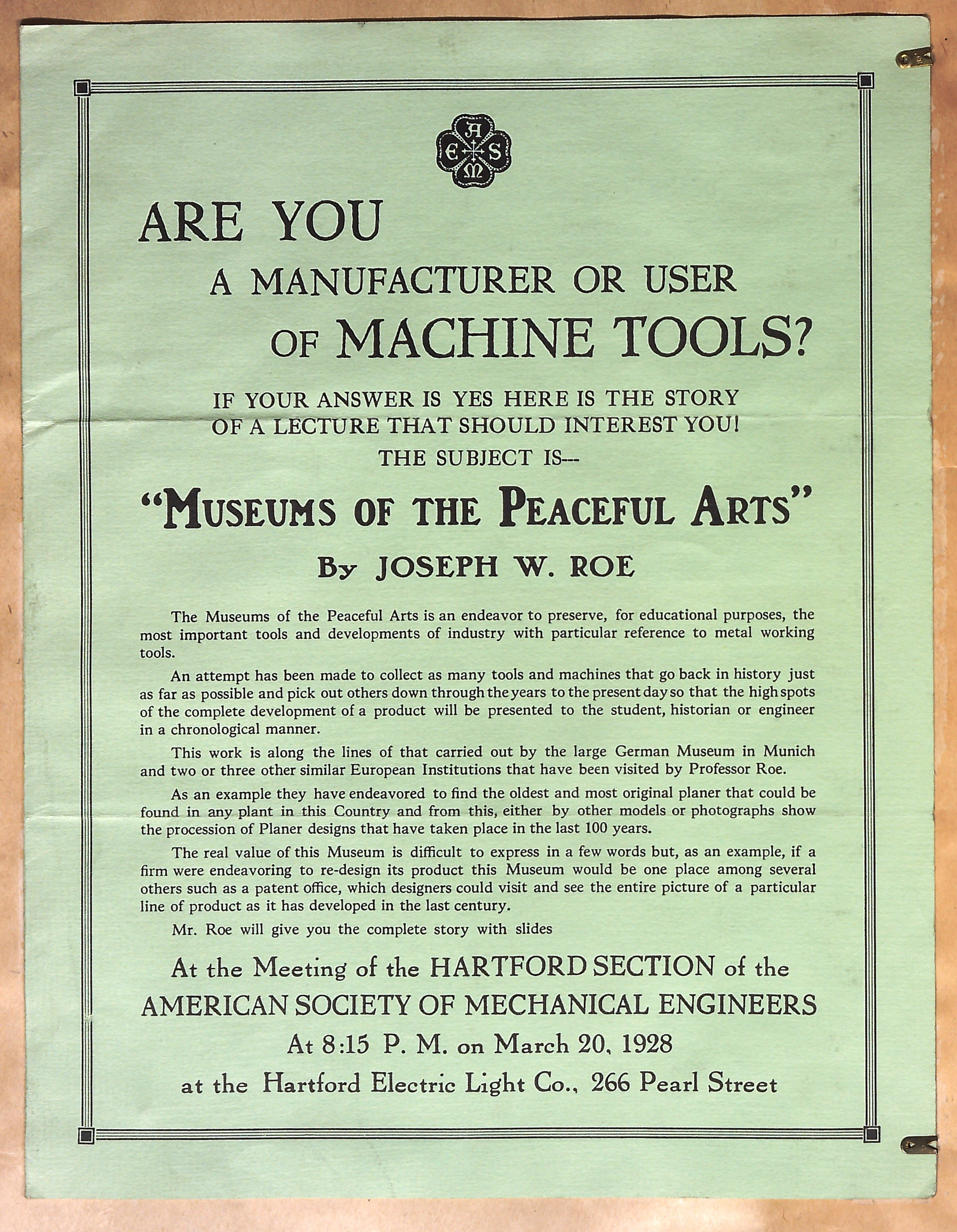
Lecture poster for the Museum of the Peaceful Arts

== Bibliography ==
- "THE FORD EXHIBIT AT THE MUSEUM OF THE PEACEFUL ARTS." Science. 1925 Dec 18; 62(1616): xii.
- Kunz, George F. "Museums of the Peaceful Arts: Album of Plans." 1927. Unpaged, no place of publication given. (Library of Congress)
- Kunz, George F. "The Projected Museum of Peaceful Arts in the City of New York." New York, 1913. 8vo. 12 pages. Presented at the international conference relating to the program for celebration of the centenary signing of the Treaty of Ghent and one hundredth anniversary of peace among English speaking nations. (American Museum of Natural History) (Library of Congress)
- Alexander Konta. "MODERN RECORDS MUSEUMS; Founder of Association Welcomes Dr. Kunz's Project." New York Times. November 19, 1913, Page 08,
- "The Projected Museum of Peaceful Arts." Proceedings. American Association of Museums, vol. 6, pages 30–42. Press Notice, Sun, Jan. 5, 1912. Press Notice, Evening Post, Jan. 5, 1912.
- Museums of the Peaceful Arts. Collection of reports, photographs, and other materials related to the Museums of the Peaceful Arts, years: 1912, 1930. (Publications type: Mixed Materials. 10 volumes; 29–41 cm. Vol. 1 contains founding documents and miscellaneous newspaper clippings; v. 2–5, supplements to the president's report; v. 6 and v. 9, photograph albums; v. 7, album of plans; v. 8, "What other museums are doing: a volume of miscellaneous information"; v. 10, "The Newark Museum, a study." Typescript documents, records, photographs, blueprints, plans, newspaper clippings, and miscellaneous printed materials related to the establishment of the Museums of the Peaceful Arts. This collection of reports and scrapbooks documents the creation of the Museums of the Peaceful Arts and the institution's early years under its president, George F. Kunz. Much general information is included on standards of museum stewardship in the United States during the 1910s and 1920s, along with examples of contemporary printed materials issued by other museums. The final volume is a study of the Newark Museum (for comparison purposes), prepared with the assistance of the Newark Museum Association and curator Alice W. Kendall). Smithsonian Institution Libraries, Dibner Library of the History of Science and Technology.
- "MUSEUM OF THE PEACEFUL ARTS." Science 27 August 1926: Vol. 64 no. 1652 pp. 199–200. DOI: 10.1126/science.64.1652.199-a
