= Alan J. Friedman =

American physicist (1942–2014)

- Born: November 15, 1942; Brooklyn, New York City, US
- Died: May 4, 2014 (aged 71)
- Education: Georgia Tech; Florida State University
- Known for: 22 year leadership of the New York Hall of Science
- Spouse: Michaele "Mickey" Friedman (Thompson)
- Awards: 1996 Award for the Public Understanding of Science and Technology from the American Association for the Advancement of Science
- Scientific career
- Fields: physics
- Workplaces: New York Hall of Science, Cultural Institutions Group, Lawrence Hall of Science

Alan J. Friedman (November 14, 1942 – May 4, 2014) was a physicist who was director of the New York Hall of Science (NYSCI) for 22 years. He died of pancreatic cancer at the age of 71.

Friedman received the 1996 Award for the Public Understanding of Science and Technology from the American Association for the Advancement of Science.
