= Gingerbread Lane =

Nonprofit seasonal display

GingerBread Lane
- Artist: Jon Lovitch
- Year: 1994–
- Location: Smithsonian Institution New York Hall of Science Capital Children's Museum, New York City Philadelphia Richmond, Virginia
- Website: gingerbread-lane.org

GingerBread Lane is a non-profit seasonal display of a handmade gingerbread village prepared by chef Jon Lovitch. He has made the display every year since 1994. Gingerbread Lane has been featured in the Smithsonian Institution, Richmond, Virginia, Pittsburgh, Pennsylvania, and the New York Hall of Science.

The display requires about nine months and 1,500 hours to complete.

== 2013 Gingerbread Lane ==
The 2013 Gingerbread Lane display was exhibited at the New York Hall of Science and weighed 1.5 tons and covered 300 square feet. The display included 135 residential and 22 commercial buildings made of gingerbread along with trees, signs and five two-foot tall nutcrackers. The display was certified by Guinness World Records as the world's largest gingerbread village on November 22, 2013.

== Process ==
Jon Lovitch, a Kansas City, Missouri-born chef, prepares all the ingredients for the display in his apartment, which is located in the South Bronx area of New York City. He often works on the project in the evenings after returning from work at New York's Marriott at the Brooklyn Bridge, where he is executive sous chef.

Lovitch prepares gingerbread, icing and other materials for the display throughout the year and stores completed gingerbread structures in an empty bedroom in his apartment. He later assembles the village by hand at the exhibition site. The Gingerbread Lane display generally begins in November and lasts through early January. Lovitch gives away pieces of the gingerbread village to visitors of the display following the last day of the exhibition.

== See also ==
- New York Hall of Science
