= New York Hall of Science =

Museum in Queens, New York

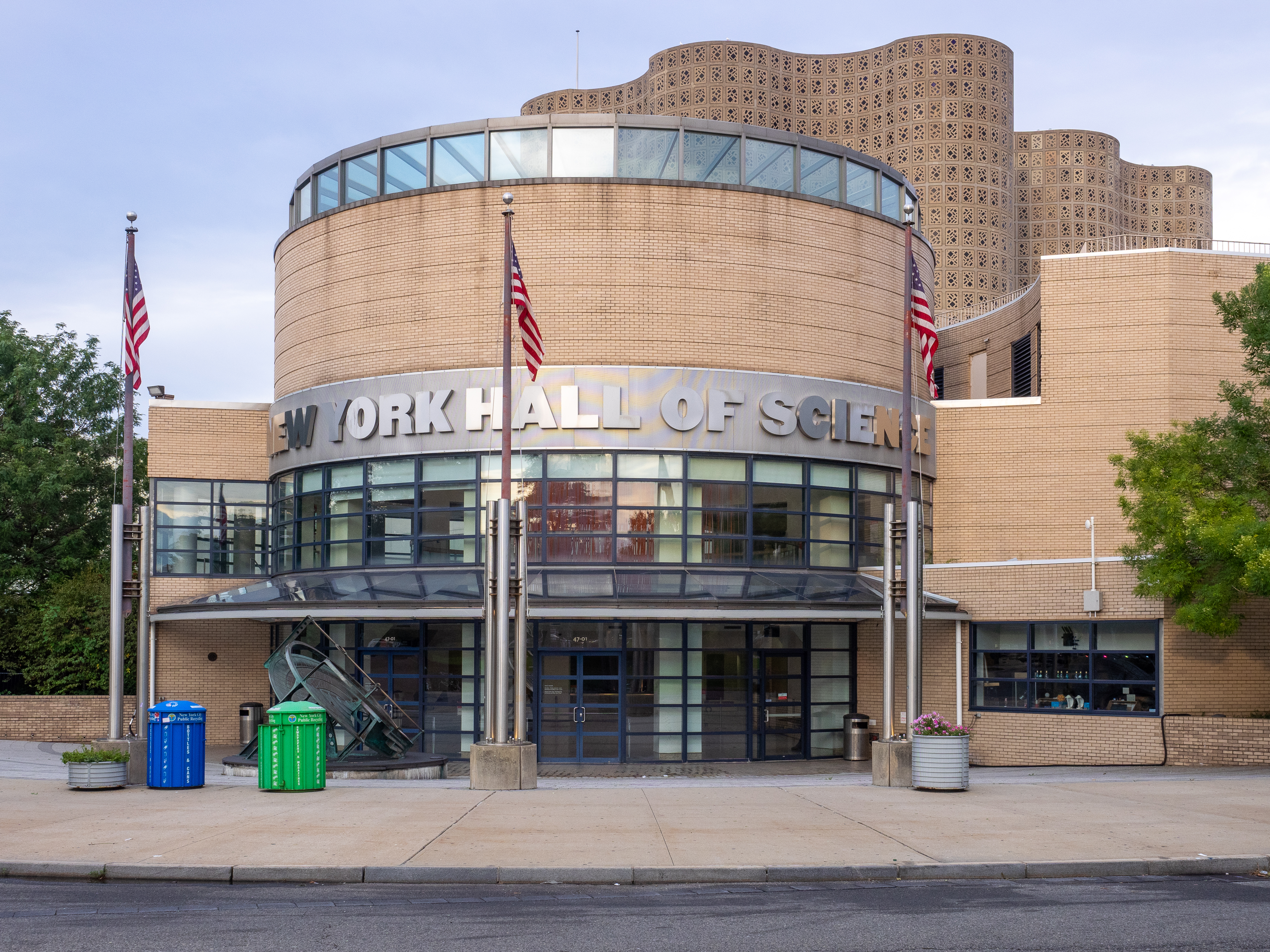
- Entrance with the original building in the background (2019)
- Established: 1964
- Location: 47-01 111th Street; Corona, New York
- Coordinates: 40.7472°N 73.8517°W
- Type: Science-technology museum
- Accreditation: ASTC
- Public transit access: Subway: train to 111th Street; Bus: Q23, Q58 at 108th Street
- Parking: On-site
- Website: nysci.org

The New York Hall of Science (branded as NYSCI) is a science museum at 47-01 111th Street, within Flushing Meadows–Corona Park, in the Corona neighborhood of Queens in New York City, New York, US. It occupies one of the few remaining structures from the 1964 New York World's Fair, along with two annexes completed in 1996 and 2004. There are more than 400 interactive exhibits, which focus on biology, chemistry, and physics. Wallace Harrison designed the original structure, an 80-foot-high (24 m) curving concrete structure called the Great Hall. It adjoins an entrance rotunda designed by Beyer Blinder Belle; a glass-and-metal north wing designed by Todd H. Schliemann; a science playground; and Rocket Park, which contains a collection of spacecraft.

The museum includes the Hall of Science pavilion and the adjacent Space Park, developed for the 1964 New York World's Fair. The Hall of Science opened as a fair attraction on June 16 and reopened as a museum on September 21, 1966. There was an attempt to renovate the museum in the 1970s. The museum was temporarily shuttered in January 1981 for another renovation, but, due to financial issues, it was abandoned after the renovation was completed in 1983. Alan J. Friedman took over, reopening it in 1986; he also oversaw the development of the two annexes. The original building was renovated between 2009 and 2015. The museum was temporarily closed during the early 2020s due to the COVID-19 pandemic and Hurricane Ida.

The New York Hall of Science mainly focuses on children's education. It includes a large permanent collection and range of traveling exhibitions. It has hosted numerous temporary exhibits over the years, although many of its exhibits in the 1960s and 1970s had only a tangential connection to science. It offers several programs for students, operates the Alan J. Friedman Center for youth education, and holds events such as the seasonal Queens Night Market and Maker Faire.

== World's Fair use ==
The current New York Hall of Science museum includes both the Hall of Science pavilion and the adjacent Space Park at Flushing Meadows–Corona Park in Queens, New York City, United States. Both structures were originally built for the 1964 New York World's Fair, which US president Dwight D. Eisenhower had approved in 1959. At the time the Hall of Science was built, New York City lacked an active science-specific museum. There had been a small science museum, the New York Museum of Science and Industry, at Rockefeller Center until the 1940s.

=== Development ===
==== Initial plans ====
US representative Seymour Halpern introduced legislation in 1960 to provide funding for a permanent science museum, library, and auditorium at the fair. Robert Moses, who was the president of the World's Fair Corporation (WFC), also advocated for a large science museum at Flushing Meadows–Corona Park. Moses initially supported the creation of a science museum at the nearby United States Pavilion. In 1962, City Councilmember Bernard H. Manheimer introduced legislation in the New York City Council to establish a science museum for $15–20 million. At the time, nine sites were under discussion, including the World's Fair site. Mayor Robert F. Wagner Jr. and City Council president Paul R. Screvane supported a science museum at the World's Fair. The proposed science museum was to be located at 111th Street near the Long Island Rail Road tracks in Corona, on a site that other exhibitors had shunned. To pay for the exhibits, Screvane applied for funding from an unspecified private foundation, which rejected the request as "weak".

A competing organization, the New York Museum of Science and Technology, had received a charter from the New York state government in December 1962. The museum's board preferred erecting a building in Manhattan, saying that the World's Fair building would contain only 50,000 square feet (4,600 m^{2}), cost up to $8.5 million, and could not be ready within a year. There were concerns that the World's Fair site would be too far from Manhattan, even though there was a New York City Subway station nearby at 111th Street. Another institution, the New York Academy of Sciences, wanted to build a 21-story science museum at Lincoln Center in Manhattan. Nonetheless, in April 1963, the Hall of Science at the World's Fair received approval from Wagner, the New York City Planning Commission, and the City Council. New York governor Nelson Rockefeller authorized the city government to negotiate with nonprofit organizations to operate the Hall of Science.

==== Design and construction ====
Wallace K. Harrison was hired to design the museum, which was to include 32,000 square feet (3,000 m^{2}) of exhibit space on two levels. Initially, the city allocated $3.6 million to the Hall of Science, taking funds that had been earmarked for an incinerator. Work on the Hall of Science began on June 19, 1963. By that October, the museum needed another $1.6 million in funding. To expedite the Hall of Science's construction, Harrison decided to prefabricate the concrete panels for the museum building, rather than pouring the panels on-site. That month, Wagner approved a $5.5 million contract for the construction of the World's Fair museum, and he provided a $474,000 appropriation for the museum. There were also disputes over who would operate the Hall of Science. Moses claimed that the Museum of Science and Technology's board had no control over the museum, and he wished to appoint a new board for the Hall of Science. Moses planned to retain the Hall of Science after the fair, and he wanted to construct two additional structures for the museum when the fair closed.

Concurrently, the WFC had set aside 5.5 acres (2.2 ha) for an "aerospace island" on the western section of the fairground, next to the Ford Motor Company and General Motors pavilions. In March 1964, US governmental officials announced that they would operate the United States Space Park at the fair, with various spacecraft loaned by NASA. The federal government planned to spend $650,000 on the land and $1 million on the exhibits. William Whipple Jr., the engineer overseeing the fair's construction, indicated that the Hall of Science would not be completed in time for the fair's planned opening on April 22, 1964. By mid-1964, the Hall of Science's cost had increased to $7,587,432, more than twice the original estimate.

=== Operation ===
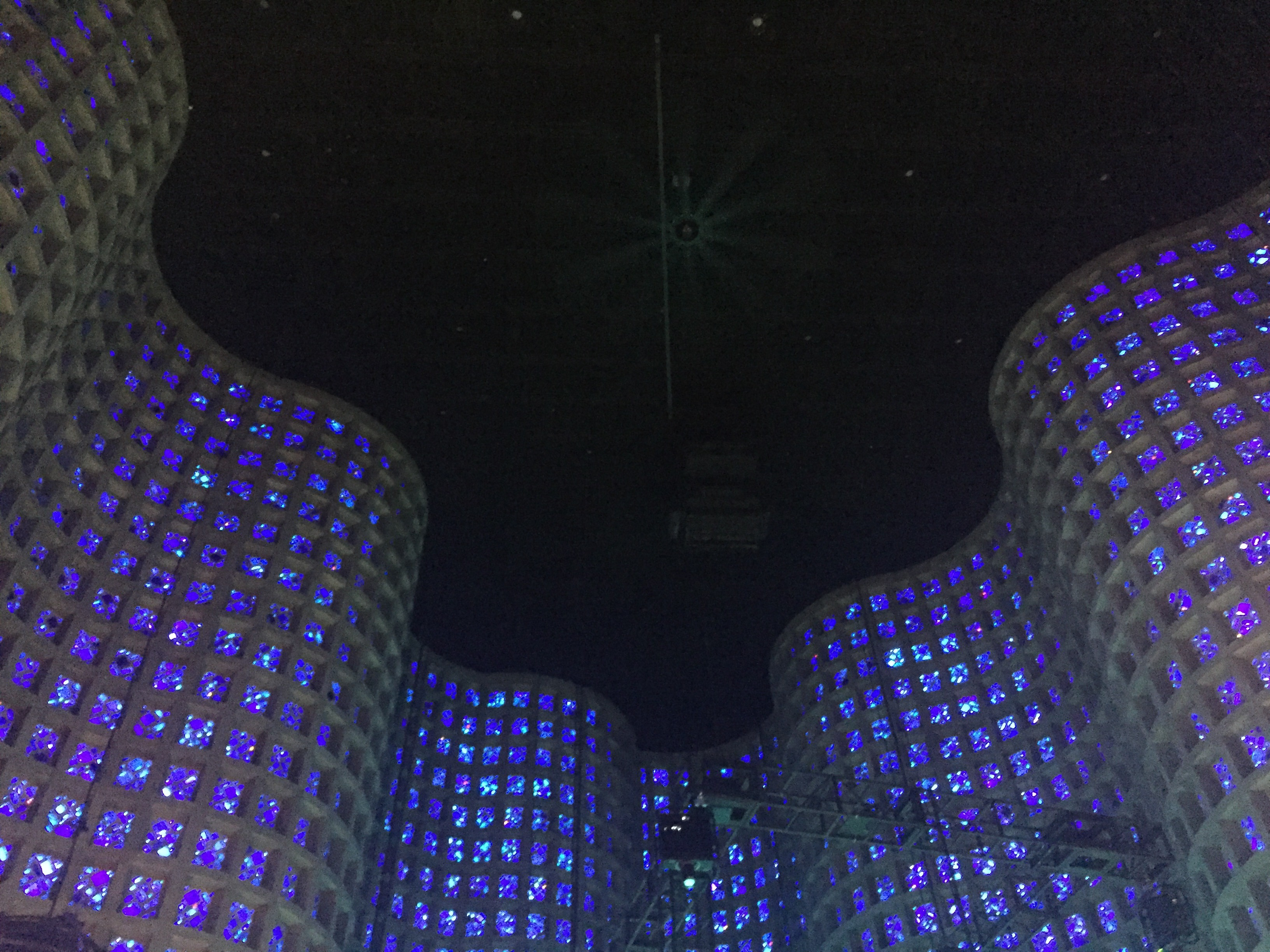
Interior of original building at night

The Hall of Science's basement exhibits opened on June 16, 1964, but the building was not officially dedicated until September 9, 1964. Originally, the Hall of Science housed 12 exhibits related to science and health, most of which were sponsored by private businesses. Abbott Laboratories, American Cancer Society, Ames Company, Hearing Aid Industry Conference, Office of Civil Defense, American Chemical Society, Dow Corning, General Aniline & Film, International Telephone & Telegraph, United States Atomic Energy Commission (AEC), and Upjohn Company sponsored exhibits in the pavilion. The biological and chemical exhibits included models of the brain, molecular biology, the human digestive system, and hearing aids. There were also exhibits about cancer detection, ocean life, and nuclear-war survival. The pavilion also included a screening of Frank Capra's 1964 film Rendezvous in Space, three space vehicles, the Atomsville USA children's exhibit, a "color tree", and a model of a busy airport with an air control tower. In addition, there was a cylindrical laboratory measuring 12 by 30 feet (3.7 by 9.1 m) across. Many of these exhibits were to be preserved after the fair.

When the Space Park opened, it included three rockets measuring 90 to 110 feet (27 to 34 m) tall, in addition to the Discoverer 14 satellite and several full-scale models of satellites and rockets. Among the other objects displayed there were a lunar excursion module, Thor and Atlas space launch vehicles, a space capsule from Project Mercury, and an Agena target vehicle. Twenty-one young male "hosts" spent 60 hours memorizing space facts, then answered visitors' questions about the Space Park. Because of its secluded location, the Space Park recorded 6,000 to 7,000 daily visitors by mid-1964, making it among the fair's less popular structures.

The first season of the World's Fair ended on October 18, 1964. That December, the city government and Moses appointed 16 trustees to oversee the Hall of Science's operation. Wagner directed the trustees to devise ideas for converting the pavilion to a museum. The pavilion was to be taken over by a nonprofit museum, and the US government also planned to give the Space Park to the Hall of Science. The second and final season of the fair ran from April 21 to October 17, 1965. During that season, the Hall of Science hosted science demonstrations. The US government also added exhibits to the Space Park to celebrate notable events in spaceflight; for instance, the spacecraft from the Gemini 4 mission was displayed during mid-1965. The Hall of Science needed at least $5 million to continue operating after the fair. That funding had not been raised by the end of the fair, prompting the pavilion's temporary closure.

== Museum use ==
=== Conversion to museum ===
The Mayor's Committee on the Future of Flushing Meadow recommended in mid-1965 that the Hall of Science be retained after the fair, though most other fairground structures would be demolished. The City Council voted in December 1965 to allocate $67,000 to the Hall of Science. By early 1966, the Hall of Science was one of the few remaining structures on the World's Fair site, and the trustees were working to convert the structure into a permanent museum. The Hall of Science's trustees wanted to convert the nearby Ford Rotunda and United States Pavilion into additional space for the Hall of Science, but Moses instead wanted the Ford Rotunda to be demolished. Additionally, the city government considered illuminating the pavilion's facade nightly after the fair ended. William D. Laurence was hired to create a report on the museum. Laurence proposed the construction of two wings known as the Hall of Inventions and Hall of Discovery, to be staffed by "actors playing the parts of great scientists and inventors".

In the meantime, the city spent $6 million to add exhibits to the existing pavilion. The Hall of Science officially opened to the public as a museum on September 21, 1966, and initially did not charge an admission fee. The museum rented the land from the city for a nominal fee. Most of the original exhibits were in the base and included exhibits themed to space and nuclear power. There were also exhibits about subjects such as mathematics and electricity, in addition to a "little red schoolhouse" exhibit for younger children. Many exhibits were holdovers from the World's Fair; for example, the Atomsville USA exhibit was preserved, and the New York Telephone Company's exhibit was split into several exhibits about technology. Other exhibits were modified, such as the basement auditorium, which became an exhibit about power plants. Each exhibit also included a telephone handset or a push-button that provided explanations to visitors. The Great Hall on the upper stories hosted a single exhibit: a space film by the Martin Marietta Company. In total, the original exhibits covered about 25,000 square feet (2,300 m^{2}).

=== Early years ===
Two thousand children were visiting the museum daily by early 1967, and Emanuel R. Piore was appointed as the Hall of Science's president that November. Francis D. Miller served as the museum's director. The museum accommodated two million visitors within two years of its opening, mainly school classes and families. Exhibits, including a replica of a lunar spacecraft's interior, were added in the late 1960s. A fence and lights were added around the Space Park in 1970 after the Atlas rocket was bombed. Generally, during the late 1960s and 1970s, funding for the museum was diverted to other projects citywide.

==== Unfinished 1960s expansion ====
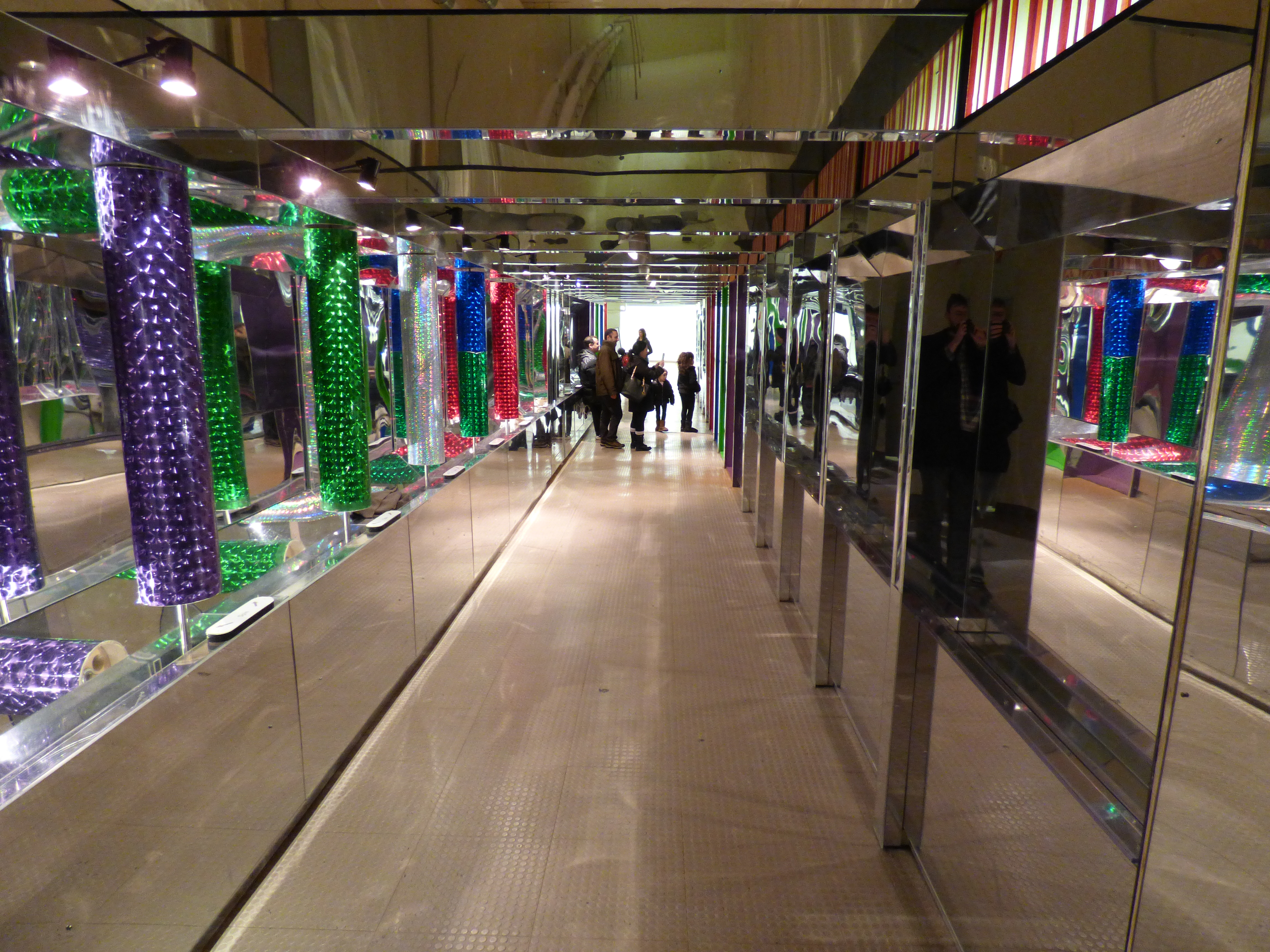
The museum's Hall of Mirrors

In early 1966, the AEC offered up to $5 million for a nuclear-education center at the museum. The city accepted the AEC's offer in April 1966 and allocated $3 million for the project. The city government had to obtain $300,000 for its design. The New York City Board of Estimate allocated $75,000 for the design in June 1966, and Mayor John V. Lindsay approved a design contract the next month. The expansion was tentatively planned to include a nuclear science center and an exhibit building. The nuclear science center would have contained a nuclear reactor, playground, television studio, laboratories, and a classroom, in addition to three exhibit halls. The education and exhibit building would have included more classrooms, where experiments and demonstrations would be broadcast over televisions. Both structures would have surrounded the original Hall of Science, though no funds had been raised for the education building. In addition, Max O. Urbahn was hired to design more structures around the Hall of Science.

Final plans for the five-story, 190,000-square-foot (18,000 m^{2}) nuclear education center were announced in June 1967. Concurrently, Lindsay sought to obtain another $6.5 million from the city and $1.5 million for a nuclear reactor from the AEC. Later that year, the city allocated $10.8 million for the project, even as the New York City Planning Commission published a report criticizing the museum building as having "limited salvage value" and a poor design. The museum also agreed to raise $10 million from private sources. Work on the expansion commenced in June 1968. The AEC announced plans for the Hall of Science's "atomarium", a 150-seat auditorium surrounding a nuclear reactor, in January 1969. The nuclear reactor was to be placed in a pool under the atomarium. There would have been another auditorium and an amphitheater nearby, as well as classrooms, laboratories, a computer center, and more exhibits. The Cayuga Construction Corporation was hired as the nuclear center's construction contractor in October 1969, and work on the annex's foundation started in February 1970.

Hall of Science officials announced in 1970 that the building would close the following year so the renovation could be completed. The museum developed several portable exhibits in anticipation of the closure. The museum building closed in mid-1971, although the Space Park was kept open. The Board of Estimate gave the Hall of Science another $12.5 million for renovations the same year, and the city considered allowing the Hall of Science to charge an admission fee. Once local residents learned that the nuclear reactor would be a live reactor and not a model, they began protesting the plans. The city had spent $2.5 million on the expansion by December 1971, when the project was indefinitely halted due to a lack of funds. The museum had not been able to raise $7 million privately, and voters had failed to approve a municipal bond issue that would have funded the project. The $25 million earmarked for the museum was instead used for the original Yankee Stadium. The nuclear reactor was canceled entirely, since the museum would have been required to pay a penalty for not using the reactor.

==== 1970s ====
Even after the museum's expansion had been halted, the museum was still slated to receive $1 million for basic maintenance, though the museum's director at the time, Robert C. Reiley, later said that the museum never received these funds. Some small exhibits, a weather station, a hatchery, a planetarium, and an amateur radio station. Most of the objects in the Space Park were moved to Montreal due to a lack of operating funds. After the Rockefeller Foundation and Ford Foundation donated funds, the museum reopened on November 19, 1972. Reiley hoped to complete the expansion by 1976, and local civic groups asked the city to complete the renovation. Ahead of the United States Bicentennial, the museum received funding for a large exhibit about scientists in New York state. In addition, Queens's deputy borough president considered allocating $550,000 for an expansion of the Hall of Science. A planetarium was added in 1973 after the museum received funds from the Charles Hayden Foundation.

By the mid-1970s, the site of the proposed annex was decaying, and the Space Park had been vandalized extensively and was closed to the public. The city government had reduced funding for the museum significantly amid the 1975 New York City fiscal crisis, and the museum could not afford even $80,000 for a climate control system. In addition, the Hall of Science reduced its operating hours and fired some staff, and volunteers maintained its exhibits. The exhibits were outdated; one of its attractions was a film from 1963, predicting that people would land on the Moon some day. Because of the lack of investment in the museum, its staff had taken to calling it the "Hole of Science". Nonetheless, the Hall of Science was the third-most-popular museum of any kind in the city, as well as one of Flushing Meadows' most popular attractions, in the 1970s. It was also one of the most popular science museums in the United States.

The museum sought to host additional cultural and scientific events by the late 1970s, and the Japanese government repaired the Space Park's Atlas rocket in 1978 and temporarily exhibited it in Tokyo. Robert A. Matthai took over as the museum's director in May 1979. A 23-foot-wide (7.0 m) geodesic dome with a greenhouse was opened at the museum's entrance in June 1980. By then, the museum hosted scientific demonstrations throughout the day, in addition to its spaceflight exhibits, planetarium, and amateur radio station. The museum still had no climate control system, and its air-conditioning system had been broken for several years. In addition, large parts of the building were rarely used, many of the original exhibits were in storage, and the only public entrance to the museum was through the basement.

=== 1980s renovation ===
==== Initial work and funding issues ====
In 1980, the city government allocated $2.9 million to completely renovate the museum, which was later increased to $3.5 million. The Hall of Science's board agreed to raise another $6 million for exhibits. Because of budgetary constraints, Matthai had to fire half of the museum's 40-person staff before the renovation began. The museum closed for renovation on January 5, 1981, for a renovation that was expected to take two years. The magazine editor Dennis Flanagan, a museum trustee, devised plans for the renovation. The project was supposed to include 29,000 square feet (2,700 m^{2}) of additional exhibit space, a media center, multipurpose rooms, a 300-seat auditorium, and a 100-seat planetarium just outside. Flanagan's plan called for exhibits to be organized into five sections (the universe, matter, energy, biology, and communication). Each section would occupy one side of the museum's hexagonal base and would be distinguished through color-coding and two-story models.

Museum staff continued to present programs at local schools, and they mounted exhibits within libraries and stores. In the three years after the building closed, the museum spent $800,000 on staff salaries. The contract for the renovation was awarded to Thomason Industry in 1982. That May, the New York Daily News wrote that the space park models had peeling paint and graffiti, while the museum's moat was filled with "chipped cement and scattered stones". Work on the renovation began that June, by which the project's cost had increased to $11 million.

A group of experts prepared a report for the city government in July 1983, stating that the museum was too small, hard to reach, and unattractive to corporate sponsors. Subsequently, the city's cultural affairs commissioner Bess Myerson halted almost all funding to the museum and recommended that the museum be moved to Manhattan. At the time, the Hall of Science's board of directors had been able to raise only $40,000 for exhibits. The renovation had been stopped abruptly, leaving the museum with just three staff, even though the project was nearly complete. Queens borough president Donald Manes appointed additional people to the museum's board, and public-relations executive Nicholas Ludington recommended doubling the board's size to 40. The Board of Estimate ultimately restored funding to the museum in late 1983, following negotiations with Manes and Myerson. The city also gave the museum $1 million in 1984 for exhibits.

==== New director and reopening ====
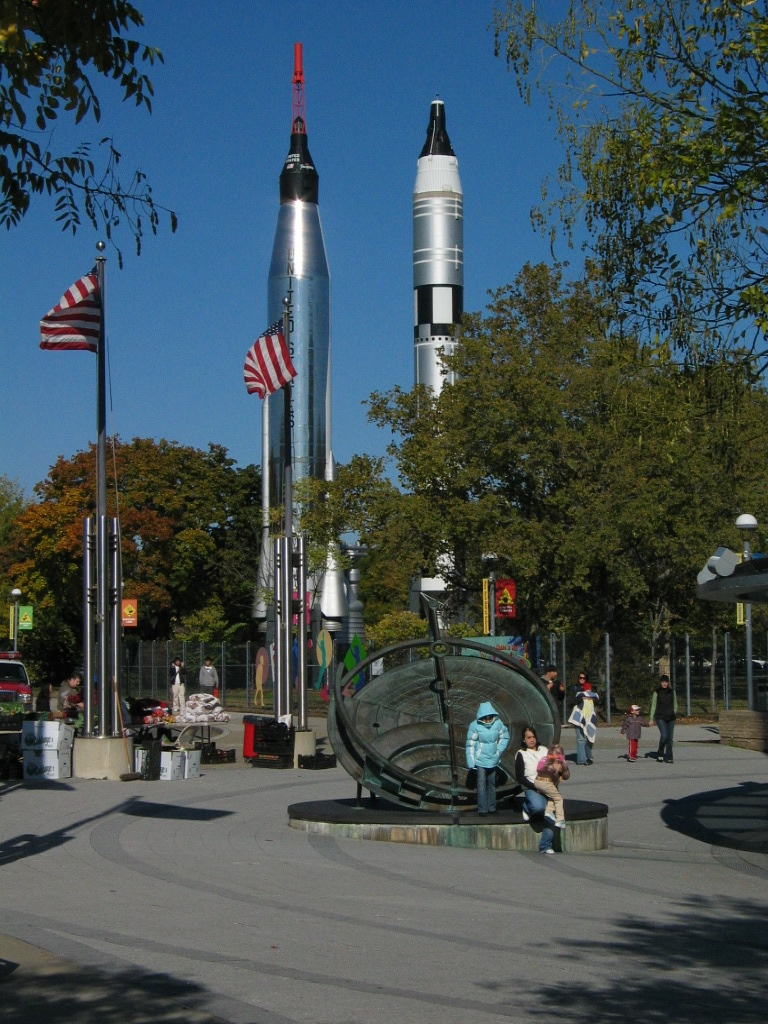
Rocket Park

In September 1984, the New York City government hired physicist Alan J. Friedman as the director of the museum. At the time, the museum had no exhibits, and the floor was flooded. Friedman recalled that he "walked through water" to get to his interview with Myerson and Queens deputy borough president Claire Shulman. Myerson offered to fund half of the museum if Friedman raised the remaining half, and Friedman expanded the museum's staff to 14 within a few months of being hired. The museum began focusing on interactive exhibits for children and outreach to school groups, including portable planetariums and a library. Friedman announced plans for exhibits on such disparate topics as astronomy, communications, light, robotics, and physics. Workers added a third story of exhibit space, office space, and classrooms, and they replaced a leaking roof and mechanical systems. The restored Hall of Science had 100 exhibits; though most of the exhibits were built by the Exploratorium for IBM, although some of the exhibits were built by the Hall of Science's staff.

The Hall of Science temporarily reopened in early 1985 when the Ontario Science Centre presented its Science Circus exhibit there. Friedman also solicited feedback from young visitors prior to the formal reopening, and he adjusted some of the museum's exhibits to address visitors' misconceptions about scientific principles. The museum soft-reopened in July 1986, with 90 activities and exhibits open to the public. It was rededicated on October 8, 1986, after $9 million in renovations. The museum employed 35 college students who explained and demonstrated the exhibits to visitors, and the upper-level Great Hall was to be used for scientific demonstrations and ceremonies. Staff members expected that the renovated Hall of Science would attract up to 700,000 visitors a year. The city government also cut back its funding of the museum, agreeing to fund half of the museum's budget rather than the entire budget.

The Hall of Science continued to develop exhibits and programs in the late 1980s, such as an interactive biology exhibit and electronic kiosks. Annual attendance increased 25% per year in the four years after the museum reopened, leading the city to pursue a further expansion. Friedman estimated in 1988 that the Hall of Science had 5,000 weekly visitors, of which 60 percent were youth groups and school groups. An artwork was also installed at the Hall of Science in 1990 as part of the city government's Percent for Art initiative. By the early 1990s, the museum had 150 interactive activities and over 250,000 annual visitors. Because the museum did not have a prominent main entrance, many passersby assumed that the museum was not open.

=== Expansions ===
==== Early and mid-1990s expansion ====
In 1991, the museum announced a master plan for its renovation and expansion. The first phase of the expansion was to cost $13 million and was slated to include a two-story entrance rotunda with an auditorium, gift shop, and cafeteria. This expansion also added 28,400 square feet (2,640 m^{2}) of public space. Hall of Science officials estimated that the expansion would increase the museum's annual attendance from 220,000 to 1.5 million people. Originally scheduled to begin in mid-1992, work on the expansion began that December. The state government provided $1 million for the project, and the museum remained open during the expansion. The federal government also provided $2.5 million for the installation of a remote-controlled telescope, and the "Singing Shadows" exhibit was added in the mid-1990s. The Great Hall was temporarily closed in 1994 after a metal object dropped from the ceiling and killed a visitor.

While the rotunda was still under construction, Friedman announced plans in early 1995 for a 20,000-square-foot (1,900 m^{2}) science playground at the Hall of Science. The playground was planned to cost $2 million and include dozens of physics-themed exhibits, attractions, and structures. The new main entrance building was finished in April 1996, and two exhibits were added within the entrance building. At the time, the museum had more than 160 or nearly 170 activities and exhibits. The auditorium opened in November 1996, and the science playground was completed in June 1997. For his role in expanding the museum's exhibit space and programs, Friedman received the Public Understanding of Science and Technology award in 1997 from the American Association for the Advancement of Science. The same year, the Queens Chamber of Commerce gave the museum an award for its design of the science playground. Another permanent exhibit, Marvelous Molecules, was dedicated at the Hall of Science in 1999, and a "sound station" in the science playground opened that year.

==== Late 1990s and 2000s ====
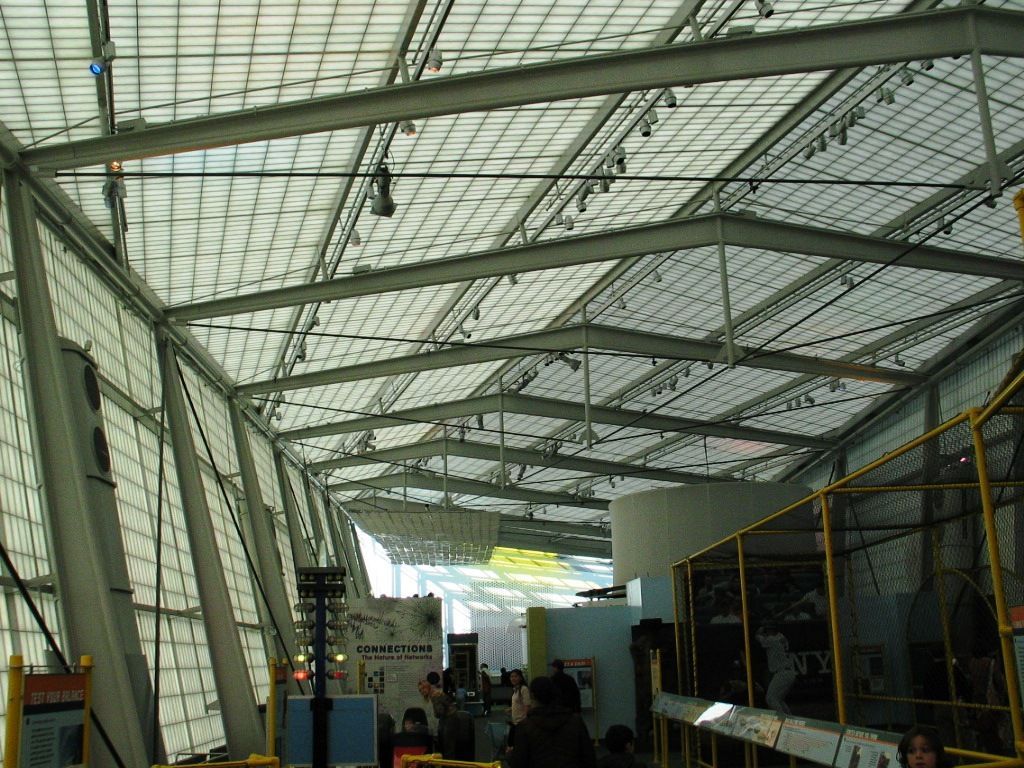
Interior of the north wing

The Queens borough president's office allocated $500,000 for the restoration of the Space Park in 1998, on the condition that the museum raise another $300,000. By then, the museum was planning to spend $55 million on a second expansion, including $35 million from the city government and $20 million from corporate and individual donors. At the time, the museum building had 35,000 square feet (3,300 m^{2}) of exhibits and was often overcrowded. The expansion would include new exhibition space and the restoration of the former Space Park rockets, but Friedman did not want to add an IMAX theater, citing his preference for interactive exhibits. Polshek Partnership was hired to design the expansion. To raise money for the project, the museum sold off some items and considered allowing companies to sponsor some of the exhibits. By early 2001, the Hall of Science had raised all but $12 million toward the expansion. The Pfizer Foundation Biochemistry Discovery Lab opened at the museum that January.

The museum's rockets were removed for restoration in August 2001 and sent to Akron, Ohio, where the construction firm Thomarios renovated the rockets. Reduced revenue and attendance after the September 11 attacks prompted the museum to downscale its budget and fire staffers, and the museum also had to cut back operating hours and cancel some temporary exhibits. Even so, work on the second expansion began that October, although most of the bids exceeded the project's budget. The city government provided three-fifths of the budget, which had increased to an estimated $68 million by late 2001. The renovation included the construction of a wing named Science City, which would double the museum's capacity and exhibit space. By early 2002, the project was planned to be completed in late 2004. The museum raised money for the expansion at its annual awards galas, and the New York City Council also provided $5 million in funding. Meanwhile, revenue continued to decrease, prompting museum officials to express concerns that there would not be enough money to operate the new wing.

The original museum continued to operate while the expansion was being built. Museum officials proposed adding a science-education complex at the World Trade Center site in 2003, and the museum's rockets were reinstalled that October. The science playground reopened in April 2004 following a renovation, and Rocket Park was formally dedicated later that year on September 30. The north wing opened on November 24, 2004. The second phase of the expansion cost $89 million in total, including $12 million for Rocket Park's renovation. Friedman retired in 2006, at which point the museum had 450,000 annual visitors and 100 staff members. Following Friedman's retirement, Marilyn Hoyt served as the museum's CEO and president until 2008, when Margaret Honey took over. Lee H. Skolnick Architecture + Design Partnership designed a miniature golf course for the museum, which opened in June 2009.

=== 2010s to present ===
Museum officials began restoring the original structure, the Great Hall, in 2009. Polshek Partnership was rehired for the Great Hall's renovation, which was originally planned to be completed in 2012; the mayoral administration of Michael Bloomberg allocated $25 million for the project. After the Great Hall's facade was renovated, workers restored the interior, upgraded mechanical systems, added communication equipment, and waterproofed the building. A permanent exhibit was also added to the Great Hall. Interior work started in 2012, but the renovation was delayed after workers found additional structural issues. The Great Hall reopened in June 2015, and a renovation of the exterior plazas continued through late 2015. By then, the museum had 450 exhibits and half a million annual visitors.

A pre-kindergarten school next to the Hall of Science was announced in 2016, and the museum was involved with developing the school's science, technology, engineering, and mathematics curriculum. Governor Andrew Cuomo signed legislation the next year to allow the school to be built on the museum's parking lot, and construction started in 2019. The same year, the science playground was closed for renovation. The New York Hall of Science temporarily closed in March 2020 due to the coronavirus pandemic, though the museum continued to host activities online. The museum reopened in July 2021, but it was forced to close again that September after it was flooded during Hurricane Ida. Flood waters submerged the basement and destroyed half of the exhibits, though the newer north wing was not damaged. Honey estimated that the museum had sustained $25 million in damage.

The museum partially reopened in February 2022, and the rest of the museum reopened that October after the museum's staff added three exhibits. The mini-golf course was also renovated in 2022 after a sinkhole formed there, and the science playground reopened in October 2023. Lisa Gugenheim became the Hall of Science's president in September 2024.

== Exhibits ==
The New York Hall of Science, also branded as NYSCI, contains permanent exhibitions in addition to temporary exhibits and programs. The original incarnation of the Hall of Science focused on science fiction and futuristic exhibits. After it reopened in 1986, the museum focused on interactive exhibits for children, specifically in the fields of technology and science. Scientific demonstrations are also hosted. The museum is a member of the Association of Science and Technology Centers.

=== Permanent ===
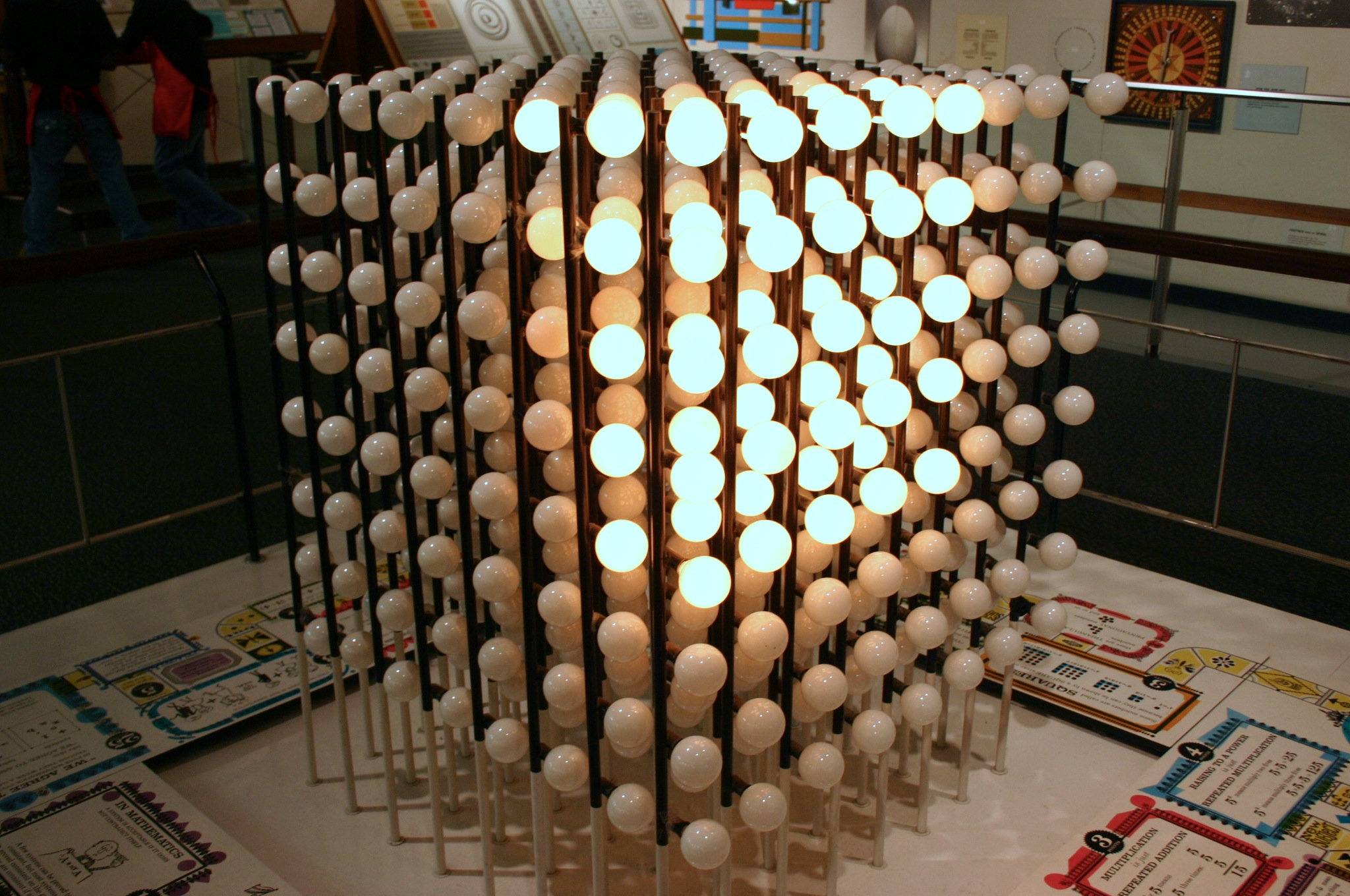
An interactive multiplication machine at the Mathematica exhibit, one of the museum's permanent exhibits

Since the Hall of Science's 1980s renovation, the museum has largely focused on interactive objects, devices, and other items that visitors can touch or operate. Many exhibits are made of commonplace objects, such as a stationary bicycle that powers a propeller. Next to each exhibit or activity are small signs describing the scientific principle that is being demonstrated. and an amateur radio station operates out of the Hall of Science as well. A genuine Mercury capsule is suspended from the ceiling of the original building's basement; according to Friedman, museum staff had believed the capsule to be a replica for four decades until it was cleaned.

The original building includes various interactive exhibits. For example, there is an atomic model and an optical-illusion exhibit with light beams, mirrors, and other objects. The Hall of Science has a microbiology exhibit, Hidden Kingdoms, with microscopes and an aquarium, in addition to a biochemistry lab with 12 interactive experiments. Other exhibits include Powering the City, about New York City's power grid, and Small Discoveries, about microorganisms. The iconic Mathematica: A World of Numbers... and Beyond exhibit by Charles and Ray Eames was added to the museum in 2004, and the Great Hall's first permanent exhibit, Connected Worlds, opened in 2015. In addition to the exhibits, the museum includes activities such as bubble-making stations.

When the north wing was built, it contained exhibits about the scientific aspects of art, technology, sports, and extraterrestrial life. The north wing included interactive replicas of a Mars rover; online arm-wrestling and car-racing simulators; sports-themed challenges, such as a bullpen and a surfing simulator; and a demonstration of power grids. That wing's ground story contains Human Plus, an exhibit about technology for people with physical disabilities, as well as a play area for preschool children. The north wing has hosted an exhibit on happiness since 2021. Additionally, since 2025 the museum has housed CityWorks, an interactive exhibit about the city's infrastructure.

==== Former ====
The Hall of Science rented a small planetarium for six months in 1970. A permanent planetarium at the Hall of Science opened in 1972; the planetarium could accommodate 55 visitors and had a dome with a 20-foot (6.1 m) diameter. In addition, the museum hosted a hatchery, amateur radio station, and weather station during the 1970s, and its exhibits included a power-plant model, full-size airplane, submarine, and nine trucks. The other exhibits included a "sound telescope" and showcases of optical illusions, stereoscopy, and xerography. All of the original exhibits were sold off during the 1980s.

In the late 1980s, there were electronic kiosks next to two of the exhibits, which provided information about each exhibit. "Sound Sensations", a collection of 20 objects where visitors could produce music, was added to the museum in the 1990s. During that decade, there was also a technology gallery, where visitors could access the internet, and an exhibit named "Window on the Universe", where visitors could view computer images from the Galileo spacecraft and Hubble Space Telescope.

=== Temporary ===
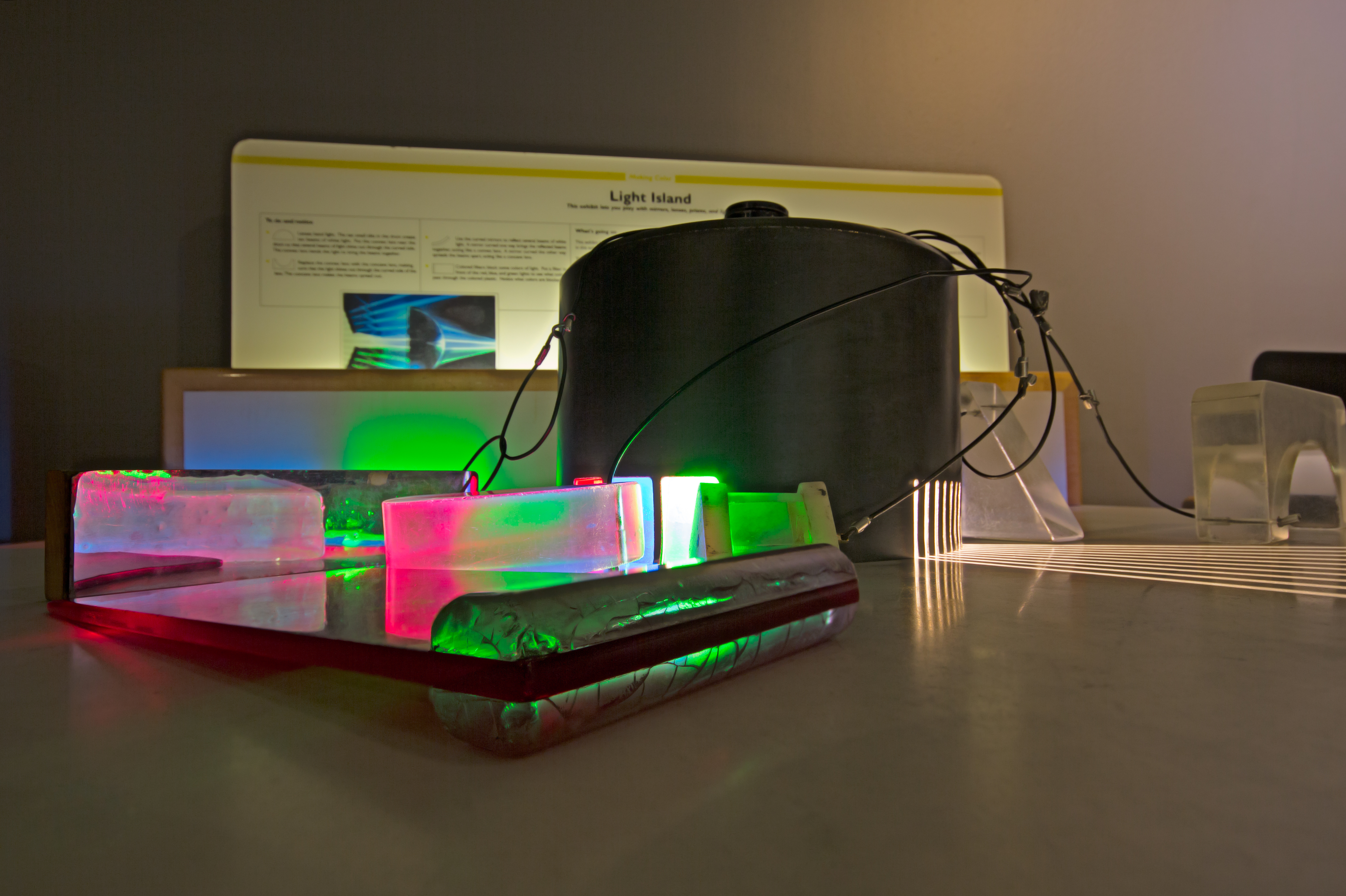
The Light Island exhibit at the museum

The Hall of Science has hosted numerous temporary exhibits, although many of its exhibits in the 1960s and 1970s had only a tangential connection to science. In the early and mid-1970s, these included a showcase of multimedia artworks that demonstrated scientific principles, a film about celestial deities, prints by Yugoslav artists, Polish textiles, and firefighting antiques. During the US bicentennial celebrations, the museum organized multiple exhibits about local and American history, including exhibits about Polish-American culture, urban planning, and chemical technology. Other exhibits during the late 1970s and early 1980s included displays about minerals of New York state, wood-burning stoves, the aviation industry, a ski simulator, and tennis matches seen through microscopes. In 1985, the museum temporarily hosted 60 interactive exhibits, such as optical illusions and ball games, as part of the Science Circus.

After the museum's 1980s renovation, temporary exhibits were presented in its Great Hall. These included The Appointed Cloud, a 1987 sound installation by Yoshi Wada, in which visitors pressed buttons to play various tones. In the late 1980s and early 1990s, the museum hosted exhibits on such topics as construction equipment, early European and North American scientific discoveries, sports training, and HIV/AIDS. The museum also sponsored standalone exhibitions across the city, such as diffraction gratings on bus-stop shelters, tidal markings at the South Street Seaport, an exhibit on manhole covers, and an exhibit about the city's mechanical systems. The museum building's exhibits in the late 1990s included exhibits based on the TV series The Magic School Bus and Beakman's World, a traveling mathematics exhibition, shows about insects, and an interactive light-based art installation.

The museum continued to host temporary exhibits in the 2000s, such as displays about reptiles, sports, women's history, robotics, and surgery. Due to a lack of space, the museum had to constantly switch out its temporary exhibits until additional exhibit spaces in the north wing opened in 2004. In the 2010s, its exhibits have included shows about cartoons, dinosaurs, and Angry Birds-themed physics demonstrations.

== Programs ==
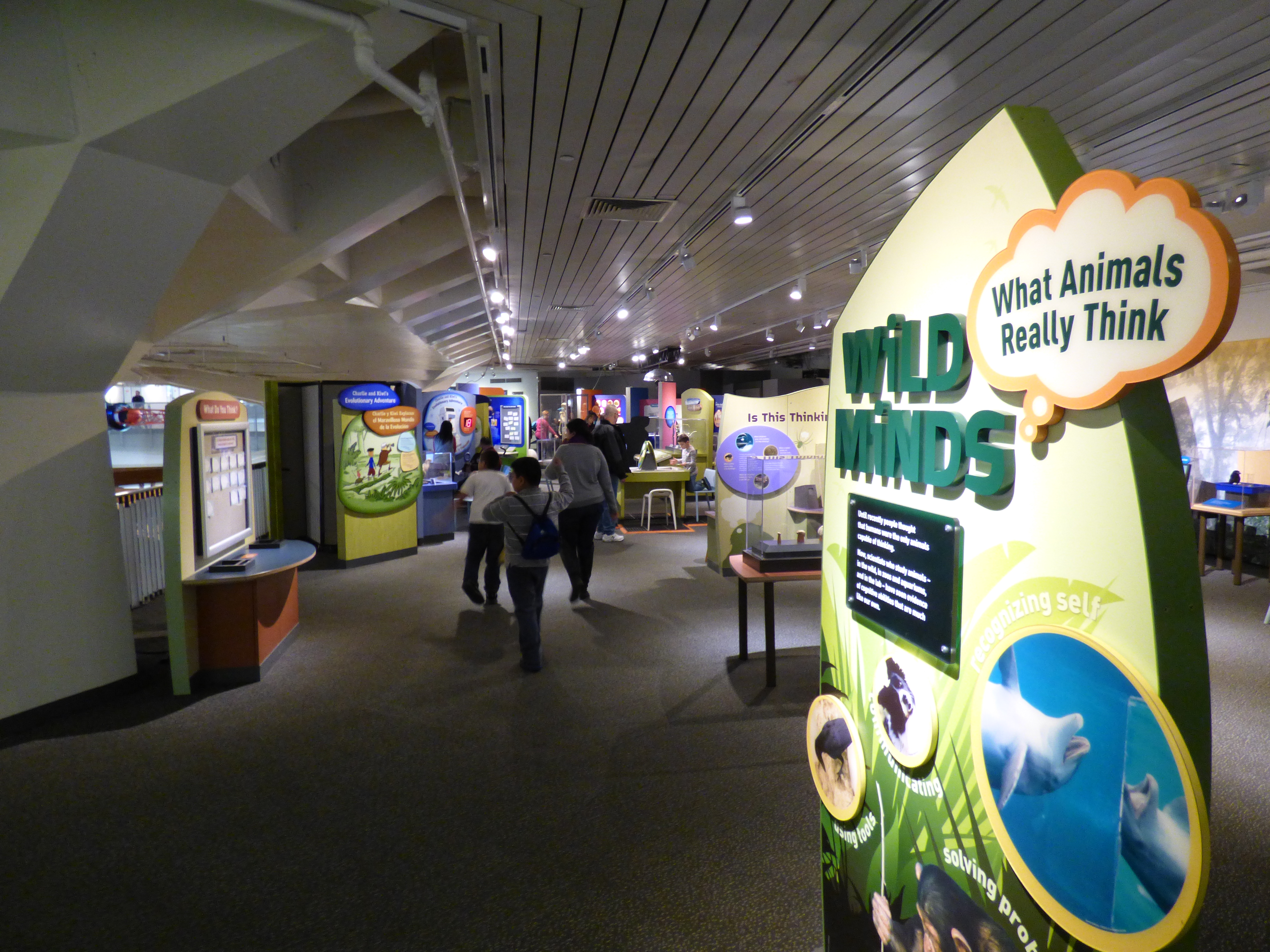
The museum's Wild Minds exhibit

The museum's earliest programs included New York Regents Examinations test-preparation classes for high school students, as well as the Space Age Stargazers program. In the 1970s, the Hall of Science hosted summer classes for children in its Little Red Schoolhouse, in addition to amateur-radio operation classes. After it reopened in 1986, the museum provided a training program for students majoring in science, who could receive tuition waivers to study at the nearby Queens College in exchange for teaching science in New York City's public schools. During the 1990s, the museum trained local public-school teachers to use video microscopes and other equipment, and it hosted workshops for students from grades Pre-K through 8. The museum added a JROTC program and an astronomy lab in 1993, and it operated an after-school science club in the 1990s.

The museum has a research incubator called the Sara Lee Schupf Family Center; it is named for the baking magnate Sara Lee Schupf, who donated $1.5 million to the center. The New York Hall of Science also includes the Alan J. Friedman Center, a youth education center. Among the Friedman Center's programs is the Science Career Ladder, which has operated since the 1980s; high school and college students in that program work as docents, explaining scientific concepts to students. The museum's other initiatives have included a teacher-training program, a Girls in Tech program, a STEM course for senior citizens, and after-school programs in local libraries. In the 2020s, the museum began hosting interactive events for families as part of its Summertime at NYSCI program. Through a partnership with the neighboring Mosaic Pre-K Center, students at that school receive free museum memberships and attend classes at the museum.

To accommodate the museum's programs and exhibits, staffers invented a portable canvas planetarium dome that was used by local schools, as well as a specialized high-resolution microscope that was later used around the world. The Hall of Science also has set up websites related to its exhibits; the first such site was created for an exhibit called What About AIDS? in the late 1990s. The museum also began hosting virtual tours in 1999 and set up a science website for children called TryScience in 2000.

== Events ==
The Hall of Science organizes various events. Its earliest events included paper airplane contests, science fair competitions, and spacecraft watch parties. After the museum's 1980s renovation, its events included flight demonstrations, science-themed circus performances, the SpringWorks art and technology exhibition, Bug Day events, and Halloween parties. Some of the museum's activities have commemorated specific events. For example, the museum hosted eclipse watch parties during the solar eclipses of February 26, 1979, and April 8, 2024. Ahead of the STS-34 spacecraft launch in 1989, the museum collected telegrams from visitors, which were placed on Space Shuttle Atlantis. In addition, the museum had an indoor skating rink during 2022. The museum's Great Hall has been rented out for private events as well, and the museum hosted a swearing-in ceremony for Queens borough president Helen Marshall in 2002.

There are also seasonal events. The Queens Night Market takes place every year in the museum's parking lot, operating on Sundays between April and October. Informal ecua-volley courts for local residents are also set up in the parking lot during the summers. The New York Hall of Science started hosting Maker Faire, a do-it-yourself science and technology convention, in 2010; the convention was hosted there annually until 2019. In addition, for several years in the 2010s, the museum hosted the Gingerbread Lane display during the Christmas and holiday season. During the pandemic, the museum hosted events to help the community, including food drives, aid distribution, and COVID-19 vaccinations. Over the years, the museum has hosted sleepover events as well.

== Building ==
Attractions and geographical features of Flushing Meadows–Corona Park
Attractions and geographical features of Flushing Meadows–Corona Park:
1 Citi Field
2 Etihad Park (under construction)
3 Flushing Meadows Carousel and Queens Zoo
4 Flushing Meadows Corona Park Aquatics Center
5 Flushing River and Creek
6 Meadow Lake and Hong Kong Dragon Boat Festival
7 Metropolitan Park (planned) and Shea Stadium (demolished)
8 Mets–Willets Point subway station
9 Mets–Willets Point LIRR station
10 National Tennis Center and United States Pavilion (demolished)
11 New York Hall of Science
12 New York State Pavilion and Queens Theatre
13 Queens Botanical Garden
14 Queens Museum
15 Queens Night Market
16 Terrace on the Park
17 Unisphere
18 Willow Lake
19 World's Fair subway station (demolished)

The New York Hall of Science is located at 47-01 111th Street within Flushing Meadows–Corona Park in Queens, New York City, near the intersection with 47th Avenue. The museum's parking lot contains 63 concrete security bollards, which show what parts of the Earth get sunlight during the summer solstice. Next to the Hall of Science's parking lot is the Mosaic Pre-K Center. The Terrace on the Park banquet hall and the Queens Zoo are directly to the south.

=== Original building ===
The original building is a pavilion that originally covered 21 acres (8.5 ha). It was designed by Wallace K. Harrison. At the base of the original pavilion is a hexagonal structure, which originally had a reflecting pool and fountains above it. Above the base is the Great Hall, an amoeba-shaped structure with a concrete wall that curves inward. This structure measures 80 feet (24 m) high. The facade is made of 22 curved panels, each measuring 13 inches (330 mm) thick. Each panel is divided into a 9-by-28 grid of rectangles. The rectangles were built using the dalle de verre method, with blue glass pieces inlaid into the concrete. In total, there are 5,400 rectangles. Henry Lee Willet has been credited with the design of the facade.

The main entrance was through a gap in the facade and reflecting pool, where visitors passed through a set of revolving doors. This entrance was accessed by a long ramp. The interior of the Great Hall is supported by massive reinforced concrete beams. The hexagonal base was connected to the Great Hall via a stairway and elevator. The base is known as the Central Pavilion. A third mezzanine level, with 15,000 square feet (1,400 m^{2}) of exhibit space, was added in the 1980s.

=== Main entrance building ===
The main entrance building was completed in 1996 and designed by Beyer Blinder Belle. The structure faces west toward 111th Street, rather than east toward the park; according to the primary architect Frederick Bland, this was done because he wanted the museum to "face the city". This structure includes a rotunda measuring 47 feet (14 m) high. It includes a 300-seat dining room, gift shop, cloakroom, 300-seat auditorium, and computer rooms. On the rotunda's second floor is Fred Tomaselli's artwork Ten Kilometer Radius, mounted onto a handrail. The artwork consists of 72 peepholes, each depicting a building within 6.2 miles (10 km) of the museum that can be seen from that direction.

=== North wing ===
Todd H. Schliemann designed the north wing, which is also known as the Hall of Light. The north wing covers 55,000 square feet (5,100 m^{2}). In contrast to the original building, which lacks windows, the north wing is designed so that it is largely illuminated by natural light. The first story of the north wing is recessed from the second story and has a glass facade. According to Schliemann, the transparent base was intended to promote the exhibits inside to visitors. Additionally, the top of the second-story facade is sloped outward and upward. The roof above the second story is composed of two sloped sections divided by a diagonal beam; due to the shape of the roof, the tops of the north and west walls are slanted. Both the roof and the walls are made of Kalwall, a type of synthetic wool placed between sheets of fiberglass. Each of the Kalwall panels measures about 5 by 11 feet (1.5 by 3.4 m) across and is mounted to a batten. At night, the north wing is illuminated from inside.

Inside, the north wing's structural and mechanical systems are visible to the public. The superstructure consists of steel beams held in place by cables, as well as steel pillars with grilles that circulate air. Eleven trusses, running diagonally above the second floor, hold up the north wing's ceiling. A central staircase hall, with a helical staircase, connects the entrance building with both the original Hall of Science and its newer north wing. The north wing includes the Light Wall, designed by James Carpenter as part of the city's Percent for Art program; it consists of a sloped pane of glass dotted with small holes. Next to this artwork, a stair connects the first and second stories. Three spaces for temporary exhibits, and several permanent exhibits, were added during the north wing's construction.

Attached to the north wing is the Viscusi Gallery, an elliptical gallery covering 4,000 square feet (370 m^{2}). The elliptical gallery, on the second floor, lacks windows and is used for temporary exhibitions. Directly below are offices and a library on the first floor; these spaces have a glass facade.

=== Outdoors attractions ===
==== Rocket Park ====
Next to the New York Hall of Science is Rocket Park, originally a 2-acre (0.81 ha) world's fair exhibit called the Space Park. During the fair, the Space Park displayed 23 spacecraft or pieces of spacecraft. Rocket Park includes an Atlas rocket and a Titan II rocket. The Atlas rocket is 102 feet (31 m) high and made of stainless steel, while the Titan rocket is 110 feet (34 m) high and made of an aluminum alloy. The rockets also included space capsules that weighed about 2 short tons (1.8 long tons; 1.8 t) apiece. Built in 1961 for the United States Air Force, the rockets never saw military use and were instead displayed in the 1964 World's Fair, albeit with the fuel tanks removed. The rockets were rebuilt in 2003 with new foundations, new interior framework, and repainted exteriors. A third rocket, a Saturn model, was demolished by the late 1990s, while two replicas of space capsules were added during the 2000s renovation.

Within Rocket Park is a nine-hole miniature golf course, which includes several obstacles that teach children about physics. For example, one hole has a rotating wheel where golfers must hit a ball within a specified launch window, and other holes have obstacles such as vertical loops and tunnels. The mini-golf course requires an additional fee.

==== Science Playground ====
Outside the museum is the 60,000-square-foot (5,600 m^{2}) Science Playground, which was designed by BKSK Architects. The playground is intended for children who are at least 6 years old, although adults are also allowed to use the play area. The Science Playground charges an additional admission fee, and it is open only during March through December. There were originally up to 30 exhibits or play structures in the playground, each intended to teach physics concepts. College students explain scientific concepts to children in the playground.

The playground was inspired by playgrounds that Alan Friedman saw in India. Many pieces of equipment are painted in bright colors and are supposed to demonstrate architectural and engineering concepts. The equipment in the playground includes a wobbly bridge, a large spider web made of steel-reinforced rope, a pair of curved and straight slides, a set of speaking tubes, and a massive seesaw. Other exhibits focus on the properties of water, such as an Archimedes screw, a whirlpool, and a table with a stream. The playground includes a water playground and sandboxes, and there is also a "sound station" with pipes, bells, and xylophones.

== Governance ==
The New York Hall of Science is operated by a nonprofit organization of the same name, dedicated to hosting exhibits, events, and education programs related to science. The museum is part of the Cultural Institutions Group, a consortium of cultural and educational institutions in New York City. The museum was designated as a New York City cultural institution in 1996.

=== Funding ===
Because the city government owns the Hall of Science building, city government officials have to approve increases in admission prices. During the 1960s, the New York City government provided one-third of the museum's budget, while philanthropic, corporate, and individual donors provided the rest. This funding arrangement remained in place through the 1970s, when the museum had a $500,000 annual budget, amid a reduction in city funding for the Hall of Science. In the late 1980s, the museum spent $3.5 million annually on operations, increasing to $5 million by the early 1990s. Two-fifths of the money came from city funds, while the rest of the operating budget came from admissions, state and federal grants, and corporate and private donations. Funding to the museum was reduced significantly in the early 1990s and again in the late 1990s. During that decade, the Hall of Science partnered with Liberty Science Center in New Jersey to raise funding for both museums. The Hall of Science's operating budget stood at $7.5 million by 1998, of which 35% came from ticket sales and renting out the building for events.

During the early 2000s, the museum experienced further funding shortages. The museum's budget stood at $8 million by 2001 and $11.5 million by the mid-2000s. By then, the city government's share of the museum's budget had declined to 13%. In 2005, the museum received part of a $20 million grant from the Carnegie Corporation, which had been made possible through a donation by New York City mayor Michael Bloomberg. During the 21st century, the museum also continues to receive funding from ticket fees, government agencies, and private donors. In fiscal year 2023, it recorded revenue of $19.2 million, expenses of $21.3 million, assets of $51.8 million, and liabilities of $2.34 million.

=== Admission ===
In its first two years of operation, the museum had two million total visitors. Most of the museum's early visitors were students on class trips or families. During the 1970s, the museum accommodated 3,000 daily visitors on average, and it often saw 10,000 to 20,000 visitors per weekend. Visitor numbers increased significantly in the late 1990s, and the museum recorded 296,000 visitors in 1998. At the time, the museum often reached its daily visitor capacity of 1,500 during June and July, and most visitors during the school year were students. The museum had 450,000 annual visitors by 2006 and half a million visitors by the mid-2010s.

== Critical reception ==
=== Museum commentary ===
Of the museum itself, The New York Times wrote in 1966 that the original pavilion was inadequate for museum use. The next year, the New York Daily News praised the exhibits as "interesting yet educational" attractions for children. Good Housekeeping magazine ranked the museum in 1991 as one of the United States' 10 best science museums. Following the 1990s renovation, a writer for The Record praised the museum's exhibits as "thoroughly modern" and interactive. Another critic, writing for Discover magazine, said the museum has "managed to harness a potent, nearly limitless source of energy: children".

The exhibits in the science playground have also been the subject of commentary. When the playground opened in 1997, a critic for Newsday described it as "fun with a purpose", and a writer for I.D. The International Design Magazine said the playground's attractions had "escaped the box and become exuberant, freestanding pieces of architecture". In 2004, Edward Rothstein wrote for The New York Times that the exhibits were too simplistic for scientists while also not being detailed enough to attract children's interest.

=== Architectural commentary ===
The original Hall of Science received relatively little critical commentary when it was built. During the World's Fair, Ada Louise Huxtable described the structure as being highly impactful and attractive. After the hall became a museum, a Christian Science Monitor reporter compared it to "a roll of cardboard stood on end", and a New York Times writer described it as "a leftover from the recent World's Fair—and a hope for the future". Another New York Times reporter from 1978 likened the museum building to a futuristic Stonehenge. Robert A. M. Stern wrote in his 1995 book that the original structure fused "a timeless sense of drama with technological modernity", while another critic from 1999 described the original building as "a glass-and-concrete cathedral to modernity". Additionally, in 1999, the Queens Historical Society designated the original Hall of Science as a "Queensmark", or Queens landmark, for its significance as a former World's Fair pavilion. The architectural critic Justin Davidson wrote in 2004 that the original building had "one of the most breathtaking interiors in New York", despite its imposing windowless exterior.

When the north wing opened, Newsday likened the structure to "an airplane hangar built by Pablo Picasso". Davidson, writing for that newspaper, said the north wing was "about the play between the obvious and the illusory" and that the building's perspective was distorted by its slanted walls and translucent surfaces. Another writer, for the Architect's Newspaper, said the design represented the fact that the museum was "emerging from its thick concrete walls into the clear light of day". Suzanne Stephens wrote for the Architectural Record that the north wing was more human in scale compared to the original structure, which was "abstract and scaleless". Stephens wrote that, though the designs of the north wing and the original hall complemented each other because of how different they looked, the entrance rotunda's design seemed out of place.

== See also ==
- 1964 New York World's Fair pavilions
- List of museums and cultural institutions in New York City
- New York Museum of Science and Industry
