= Rendezvous in Space =

- Directed by: Frank Capra
- Produced by: Frank Capra
- Starring: Danny Thomas; Mel Blanc; June Foray; Alan Reed; Doodles Weaver; Sid Melton; Charles Lane
- Distributed by: Paramount Pictures
- Release date: September 10, 1964
- Running time: 19 minutes

Rendezvous in Space is a 1964 documentary film about the future of space exploration, directed by Frank Capra. It is notable for being the final film that Frank Capra directed. The film was funded by Martin Marietta and was shown at the Hall of Science Pavilion of the 1964-1965 New York World's Fair. Animated sections illustrate the invention of gunpowder, a space shuttle resupplying a space station, and the problems to be overcome living for long periods in space.
