= Henry R. Towne =

American mechanical engineer and businessman (1844–1924)

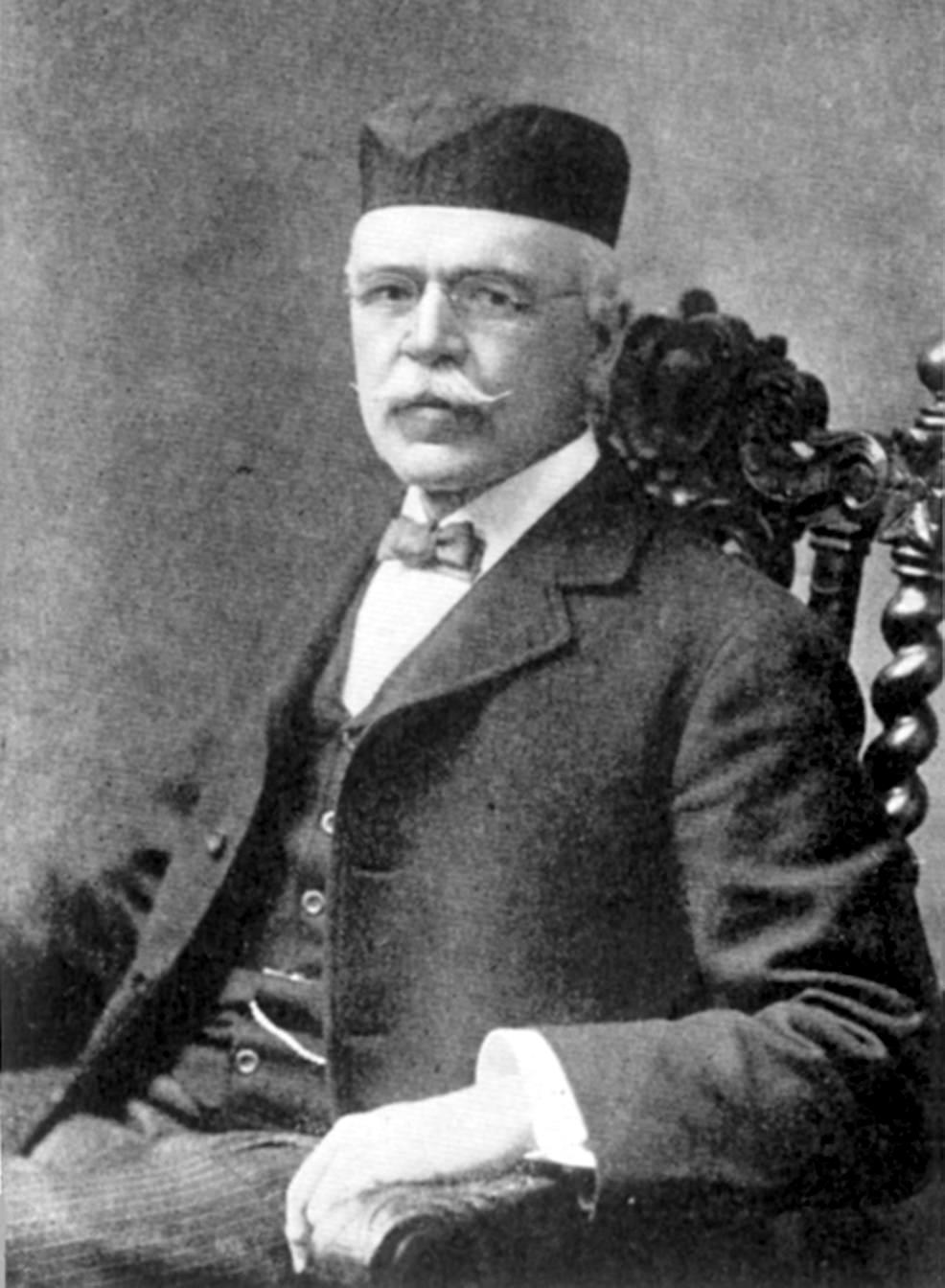
- Born: Henry Robinson Towne; August 24, 1844; Philadelphia, Pennsylvania, U.S.
- Died: October 15, 1924 (aged 80); New York City, U.S.
- Education: University of Pennsylvania
- Occupation: Mechanical engineer
- Known for: Yale & Towne Manufacturing Co.

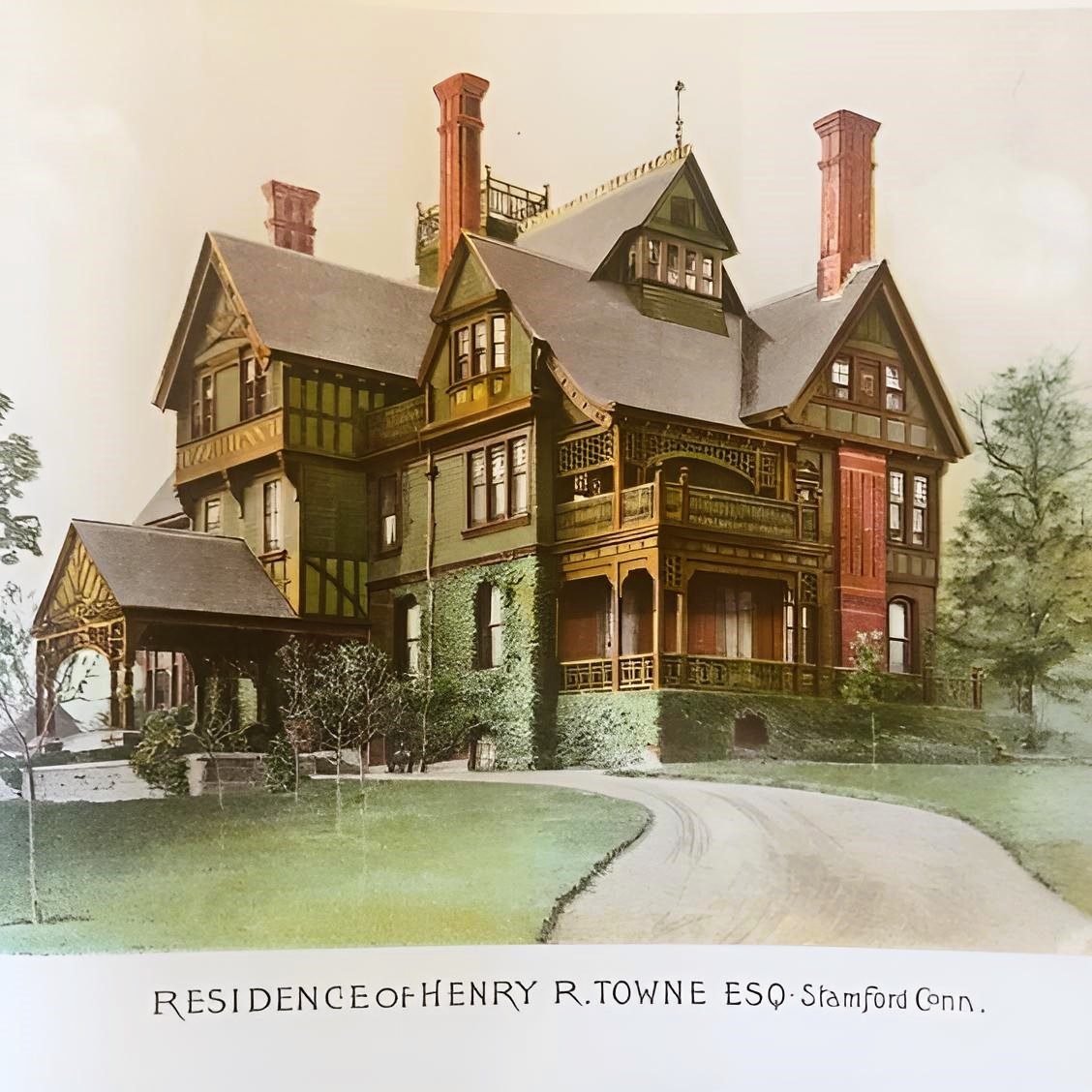
Residence of Henry R. Towne, Yale Lock Company, 1890

Henry Robinson Towne (August 24, 1844 – October 15, 1924) was an American mechanical engineer and businessman, known as an early systematizer of management. He donated several millions to philanthropy at his death, in 1924.

== Biography ==
Towne was born in Philadelphia in 1844 to John Henry and Maria (Tevis) T. Towne. He attended the University of Pennsylvania from 1861 to 1862, where he was a member of St. Anthony Hall, but did not complete a degree. The university later awarded him an honorary master's degree.

=== Early career ===
Following his year of college, Towne found work as a draftsman at the Port Richmond Iron Works, which was owned by I. P. Morris, Towne & Co. In 1863, Towne was put in charge of repair work for the union gunboat Massachusetts. During 1864-1866, Towne was placed in charge of erecting engines in monitors for the United States Navy. After the war, Towne went to Paris and studied physics at the Sorbonne. When he returned, he found employment with the firm of William Sellers & Co., in Philadelphia.

=== Yale Lock Manufacturing ===
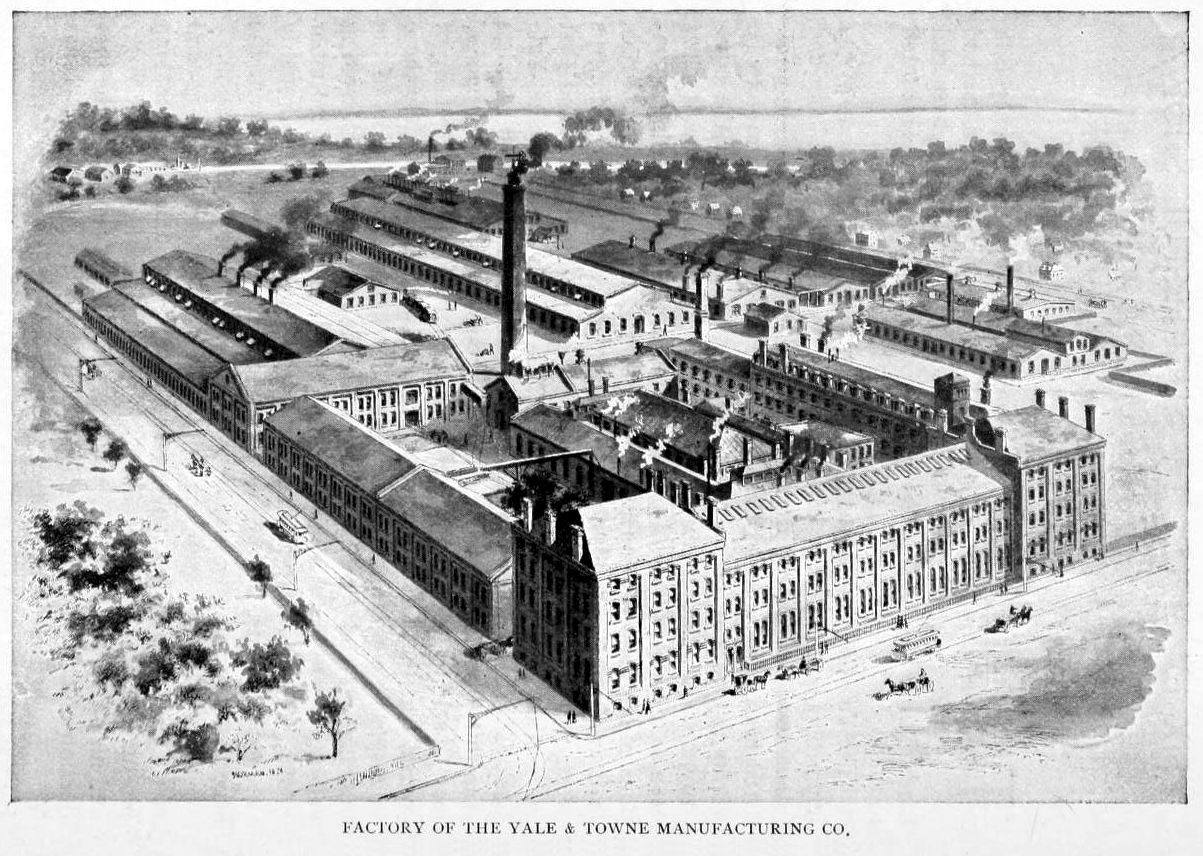
Yale & Towne Manufacturing Co, 1897.

In the summer of 1868, Henry R. Towne was introduced to Linus Yale Jr. by a mutual friend. Towne was, by this time, looking for a new business opportunity and had become impressed about the possibilities of Yale's new "cylinder" lock. In October 1868, the two men formed the Yale Lock Manufacturing Company, to be located in Stamford, Connecticut. Towne provided new capital and management of the firm, and Yale the invention. Yale died later in 1868, and Towne reorganized the company as Yale & Towne Manufacturing Co. with Linus's son, John B. Yale, as treasurer.

By 1892, he was recorded as a millionaire in the American Millionaires list book. He stepped down as chairman of the company in 1915. Board members of the company included ex President of Studebaker, Albert Russel Erskine, Congressman Schuyler Merritt, and others.

Within this time-frame he developed the Towne-Halsey plan. According to F.W. Taylor and mentioned in his book Scientific Management "it consists in recording the quickest time in which a job has been done, and fixing this as a standard.

If the workman succeeds in doing the job in a shorter time, he is still paid his same wages per hour for the time he works on the job, and in addition is given a premium for having worked faster, consisting of from one-quarter to one-half the difference between the wages earned and the wages originally paid when the job was done in standard time."

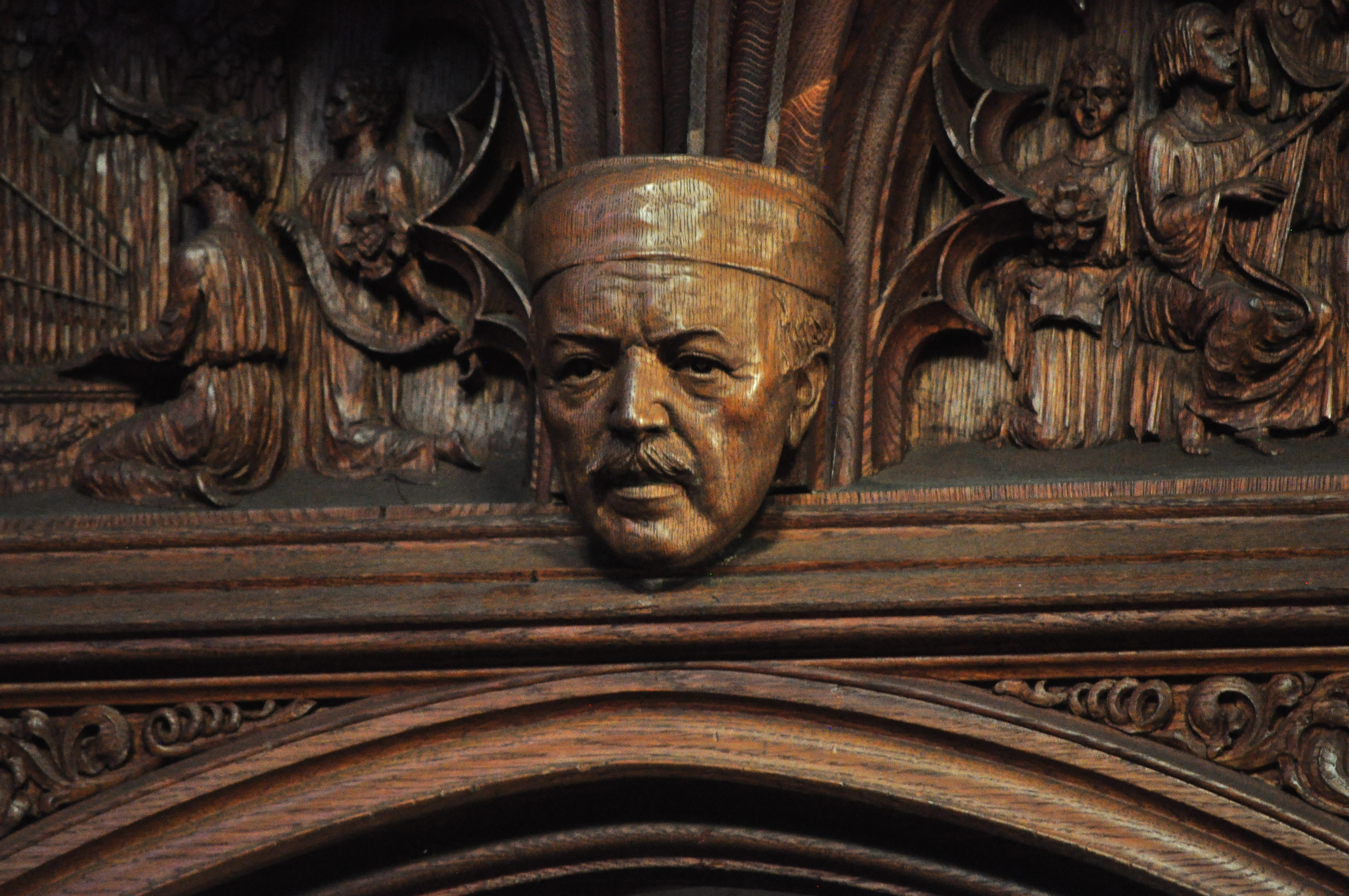
Towne portrayed by woodcarver Frank Walter at St. Michael's Church (Episcopal), Litchfield, Connecticut. Cora White had the church built in Towne's memory.

=== Later years ===
Towne was one of the first engineers to see management as a new social role for engineers and that the development of management techniques was important for the development of the engineering profession. He laid out his ideas about the management role for the engineer in his "The Engineer as Economist." He was elected President of the ASME in 1888, and his presidential address continued to address how to improve shop and worker efficiency (see "Gain-Sharing"). In 1921, ASME elected him an honorary member.

Towne and Link-Belt president James Mapes Dodge were responsible for maneuvering Frederick Winslow Taylor to the Presidency of the ASME in 1906 (Noble, ABD, 269-270). Taylor was the author of The Principles of Scientific Management.

=== Death ===
Henry R. Towne died in New York City on October 15, 1924. His wife Cora E. White, whom he had married in 1868, died in 1917. His estates was valued at several millions and the bulk of it was given to museums of peaceful arts, or industrial museums, for the citizens of New York.

In his will, Towne bequeathed $1,000,000 for the establishment of the Museums of the Peaceful Arts in Manhattan, $2,500,000 for the, "creation of a technical museum" that became the New York Museum of Science and Industry, $50,000 for education programs, the same amount to an Engineering Fund, $10,000 to the Franklin Institute of Philadelphia, the same amount to New York University, and many others.

== Selected publications ==
- Towne, Henry Robinson. Locks and Builders Hardware: A Hand Book for Architects. J. Wiley & Sons, 1904.
- Towne, Henry R. "Foreword to Shop Management." Frederick Taylor, Scientific Management: 5-6. 1911.

Articles, a selection:

- Towne, Henry R. "A Drawing Office System." Transactions of the American Society of Mechanical Engineers 5 (1884): 193-205.
- Towne, Henry R. "Engineer as an Economist," Transactions of the American Society of Mechanical Engineers 7 (1886), 425ff.
- Towne, Henry R. "Gain-Sharing," Transactions of the American Society of Mechanical Engineers 10 (1889), 600ff.
- Towne, Henry R. "President's Address, 1889." Transactions of the American Society of Mechanical Engineers 11 (1889): 50-71.
- Towne, Henry R. "Industrial engineering." Ingeniería Industrial), discurso pronunciado en la Universidad de Purdue el 24 (1905).
- Towne, Henry Robinson. "Axioms Concerning Manufacturing Costs." Trans. A SM E 34 (1912).
- Towne, Henry R. "The General Principles of Organization Applied to an Individual Manufacturing Establishment," Transactions, Efficiency Society Incorporated. v.1 1912, p. 77-83

== Patents ==
- 1897. US patents 575016 - Frictional controlling device for screw hoist.
- 1898. US patents 29786 - design for a key
