= New York Museum of Science and Industry =

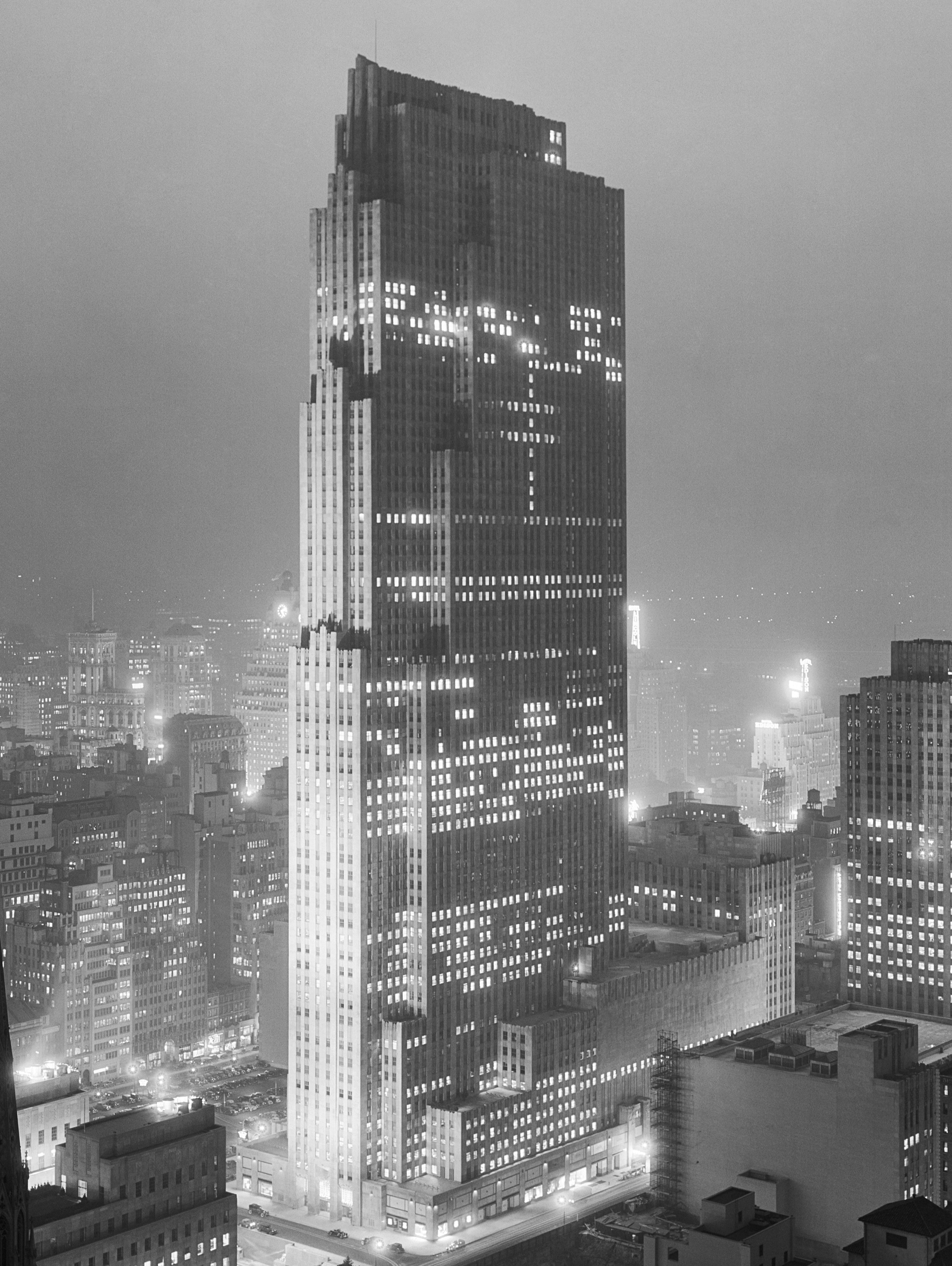
- In 1936, the New York Museum of Science and Industry moved into the lower two floors of this building at 30 Rockefeller Plaza.
- Established: February 11, 1936; 90 years ago
- Location: 30 Rockefeller Plaza; New York City, US
- Coordinates: 40°45′32″N 73°58′45″W

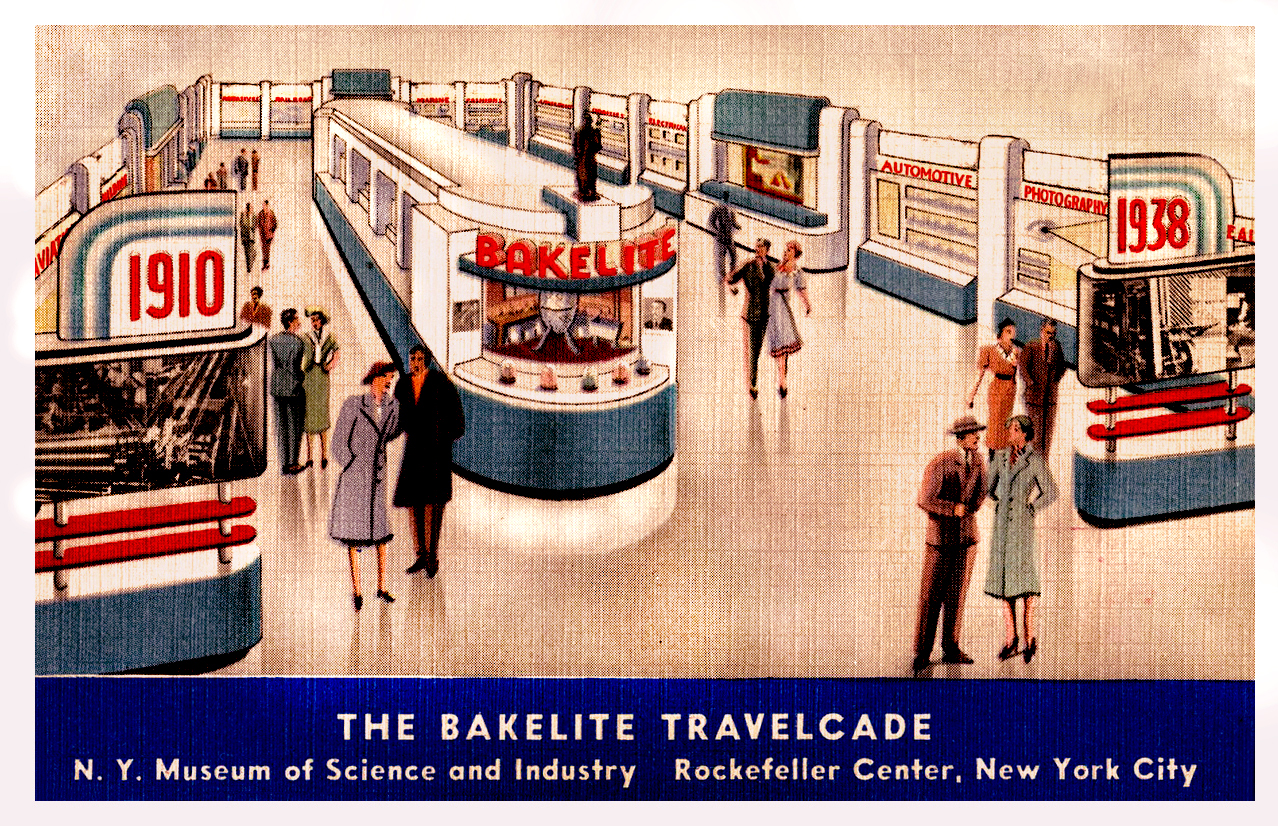
New York Museum of Science and Industry

The New York Museum of Science and Industry was a museum in Manhattan, New York City. After being housed in temporary quarters, the museum officially opened in its permanent home at 30 Rockefeller Plaza (then known as the RCA Building), on February 11, 1936. Financial problems caused it to close permanently in the late 1940s.

== History ==
Originally conceived as the Museum of the Peaceful Arts, films were made of Europe's leading industrial museums to promote its development.

The New York Museum of Science and Industry was established through a $2,500,000 bequest from Henry R. Towne, for the, "creation of a technical museum". The newly created museum was initially on display on 40th St. with a Dr. F.C. Brown as its director. Subsequently, under the direction of Prof. Charles R. Richards, "the museum found it necessary to expand".

Relocating from temporary housing in the Daily News Building, the New York Museum of Science and Industry opened in its permanent location on February 11, 1936, in the Forum of 30 Rockefeller Plaza (then known as the RCA Building). Prominent attendees at the gala opening event included Dr. Frank B. Jewett, president of the board of trustees, Dr. Harold C. Urey and Dr. Albert Einstein.

According to The New York Times, "visitors remarked that there was probably no other major public museum in the city at which no implement of war was on view". Exhibits covered topics/inventions including: the telephone and telegraph, weaving and spinning, electricity, marine transportation, light, and magnetism. The largest exhibit was called "the Rocket, a replica of the high-funneled, wooden wheeled locomotive built by Robert Stephenson & Co. at Newcastle-upon-Tyne in 1829". Admission cost 25 cents for adults and 10 cents for children, "except pupils on regular instruction tours".

The museum closed sometime in the late 1940s, due to financial problems.

== Objectives ==
Prof. Richards who, in the role of executive vice president, helped establish the Museum of Science and Industry outlined the museum's objectives as follows, "the processes of production that underlie the civilization of today are hidden behind factory walls, where only the specialized factory workers enter. To attempt to present these things through books is unsatisfactory and tame. The processes must be revealed to the eye and set forth in the simplest and clearest fashion if the foundations of our present-day life are not only to be understood but to become an element in the culture of today."

== See also ==
- New York Hall of Science
