= USTA Billie Jean King National Tennis Center =

Stadium complex in Queens, New York

Coordinates: 40°45′00″N 73°50′51″W

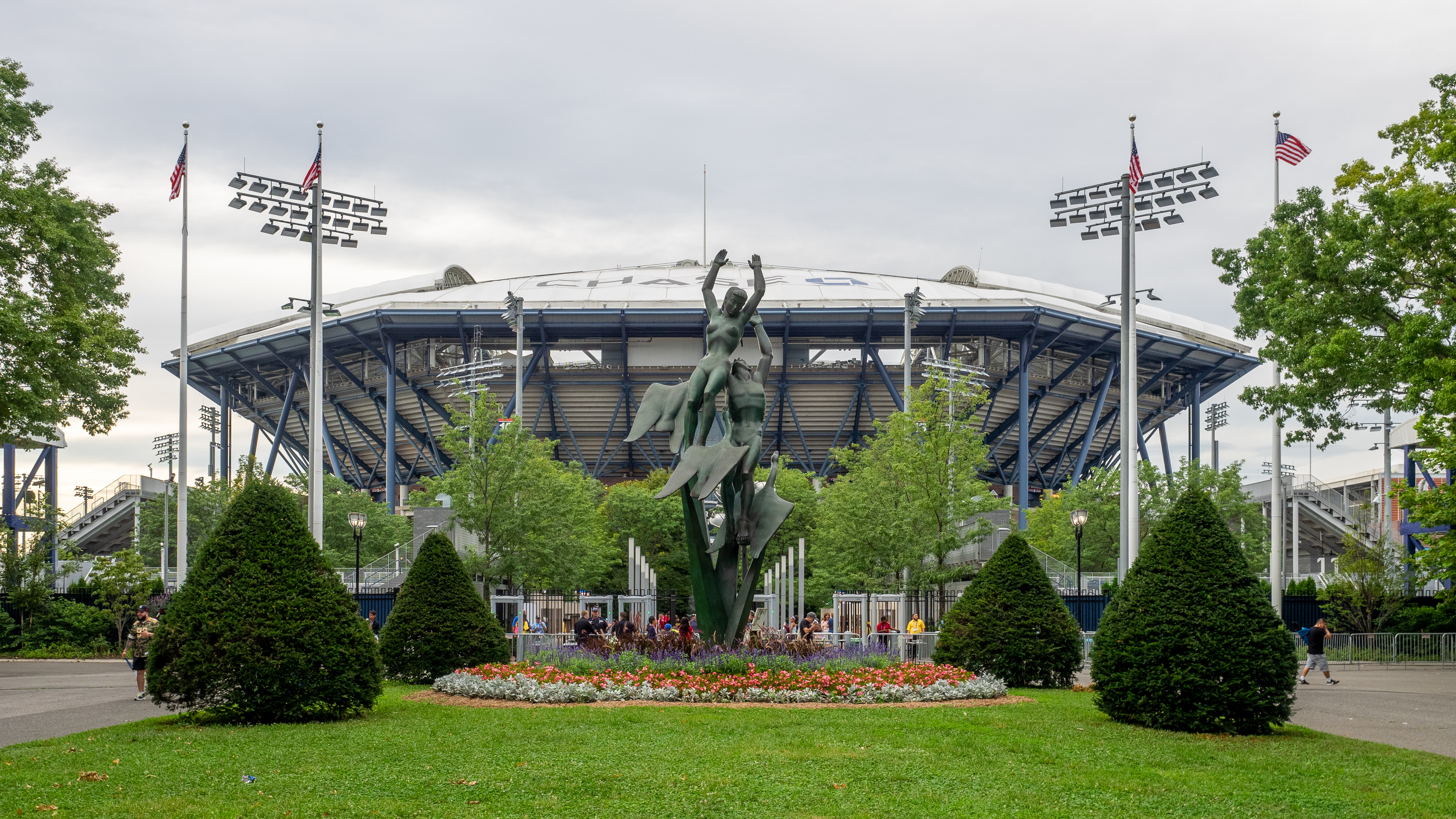
Bronze Statue by Marshall Fredericks at the USTA National Tennis Center. (2019)

The USTA Billie Jean King National Tennis Center is a stadium complex within Flushing Meadows–Corona Park in Queens, New York City. It has been the home of the US Open Grand Slam tennis tournament, played every year from late August to early September, since 1978 and is operated by the United States Tennis Association (USTA). The facility has 22 courts inside its 46.5 acres (0.188 km^{2}; 0.0727 sq mi) and 12 in the adjoining park. The complex's four stadiums are among the largest tennis stadiums in the world; Arthur Ashe Stadium tops the global list with a listed capacity of 23,200. When the facility was built in 1978, all 33 courts used the DecoTurf cushioned acrylic surface, as did Court 17, added in 2011. However, in 2020, the court surfaces were replaced with Laykold.

Near Citi Field (home of the New York Mets) as well as LaGuardia Airport, the tennis center is open to the public for play except during the US Open, junior, and wood-racquet competitions. Formerly called the USTA National Tennis Center, the facility was rededicated for Billie Jean King on August 28, 2006.

== History ==
Attractions and geographical features of Flushing Meadows–Corona Park
Attractions and geographical features of Flushing Meadows–Corona Park:
1 Citi Field
2 Etihad Park (under construction)
3 Flushing Meadows Carousel and Queens Zoo
4 Flushing Meadows Corona Park Aquatics Center
5 Flushing River and Creek
6 Meadow Lake and Hong Kong Dragon Boat Festival
7 Metropolitan Park (planned) and Shea Stadium (demolished)
8 Mets–Willets Point subway station
9 Mets–Willets Point LIRR station
10 National Tennis Center and United States Pavilion (demolished)
11 New York Hall of Science
12 New York State Pavilion and Queens Theatre
13 Queens Botanical Garden
14 Queens Museum
15 Queens Night Market
16 Terrace on the Park
17 Unisphere
18 Willow Lake
19 World's Fair subway station (demolished)

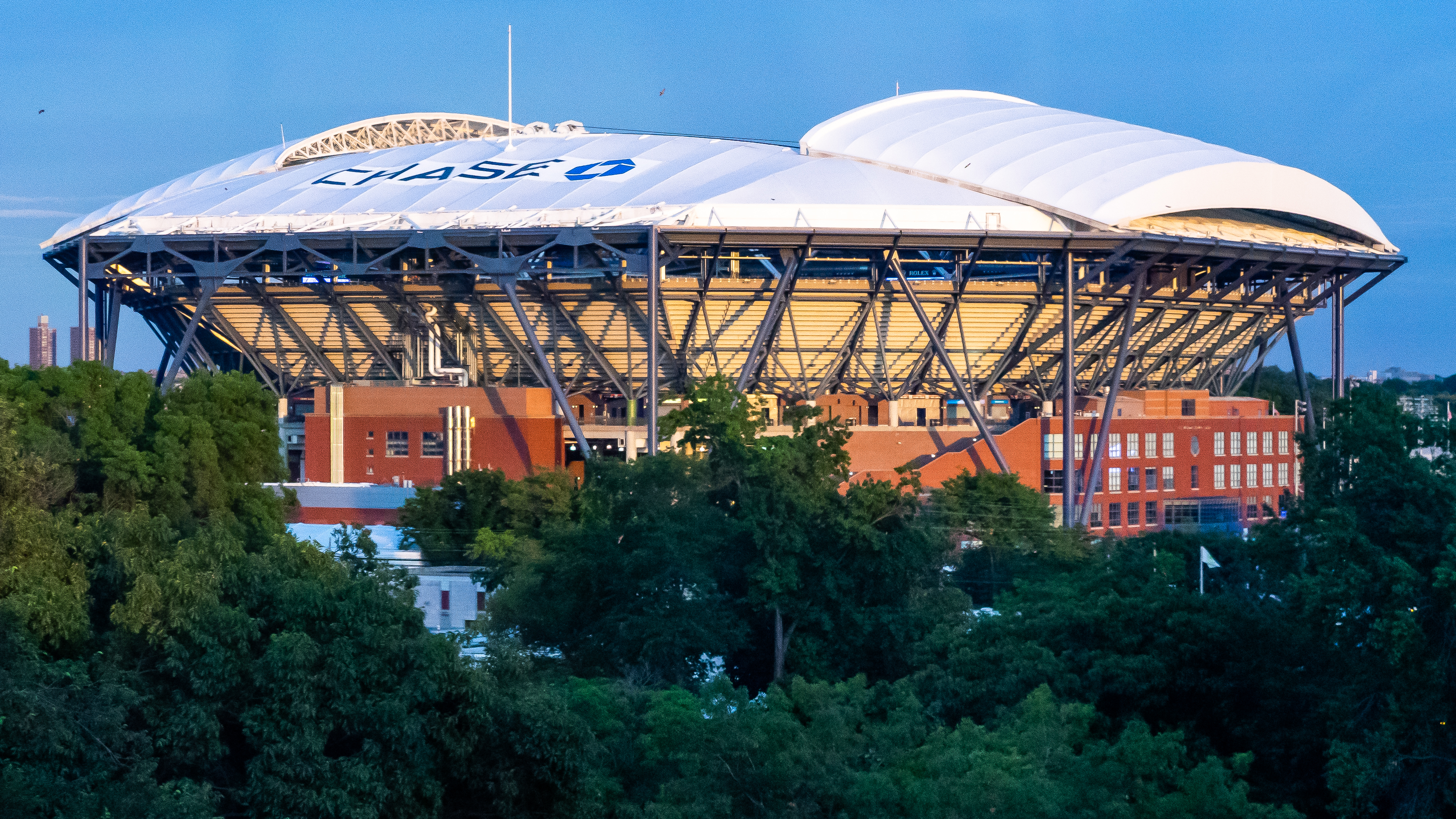
Arthur Ashe Stadium, with retractable roof

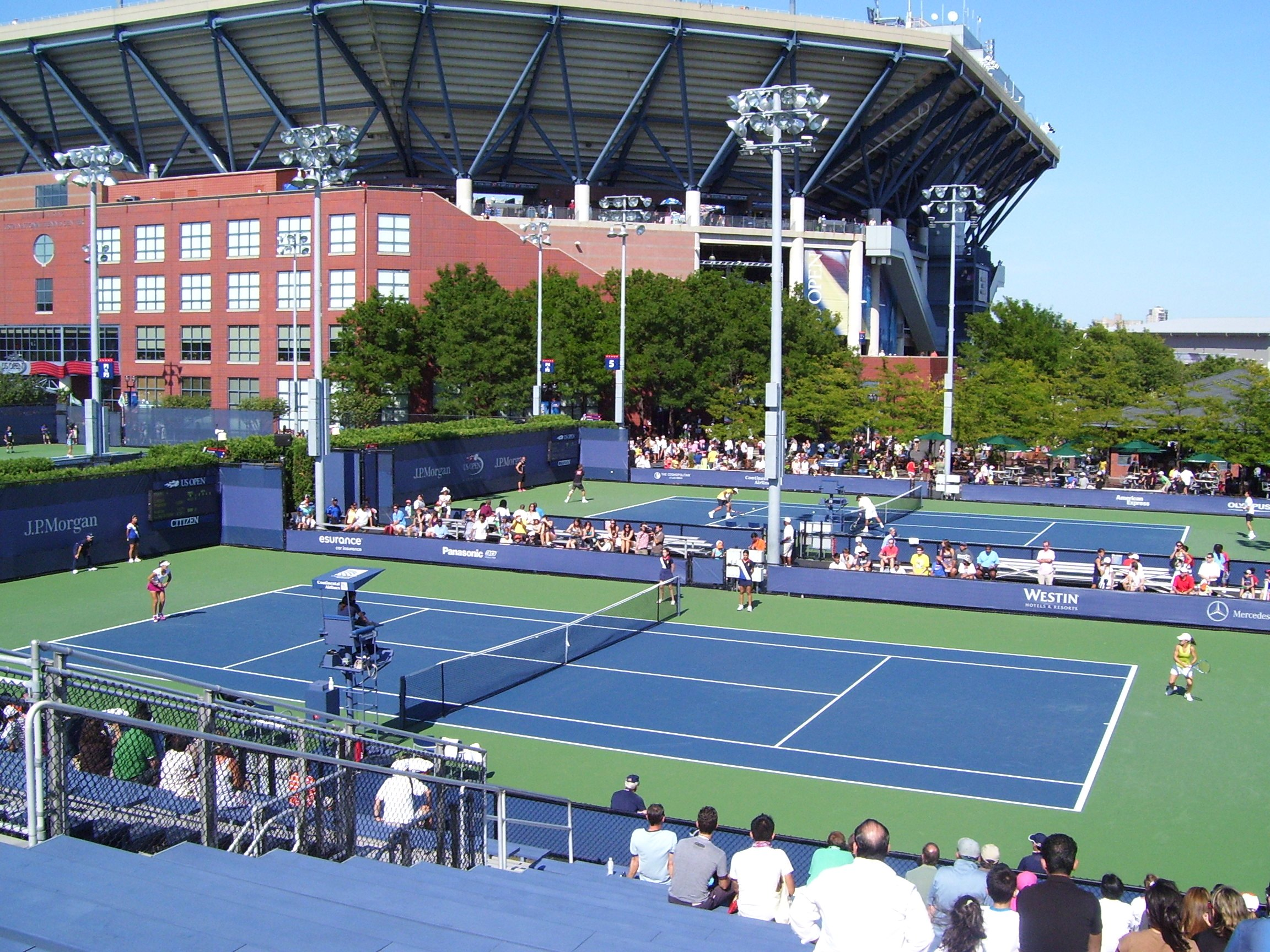
Some of the side courts, with Ashe Stadium in the background, before the canopy was added

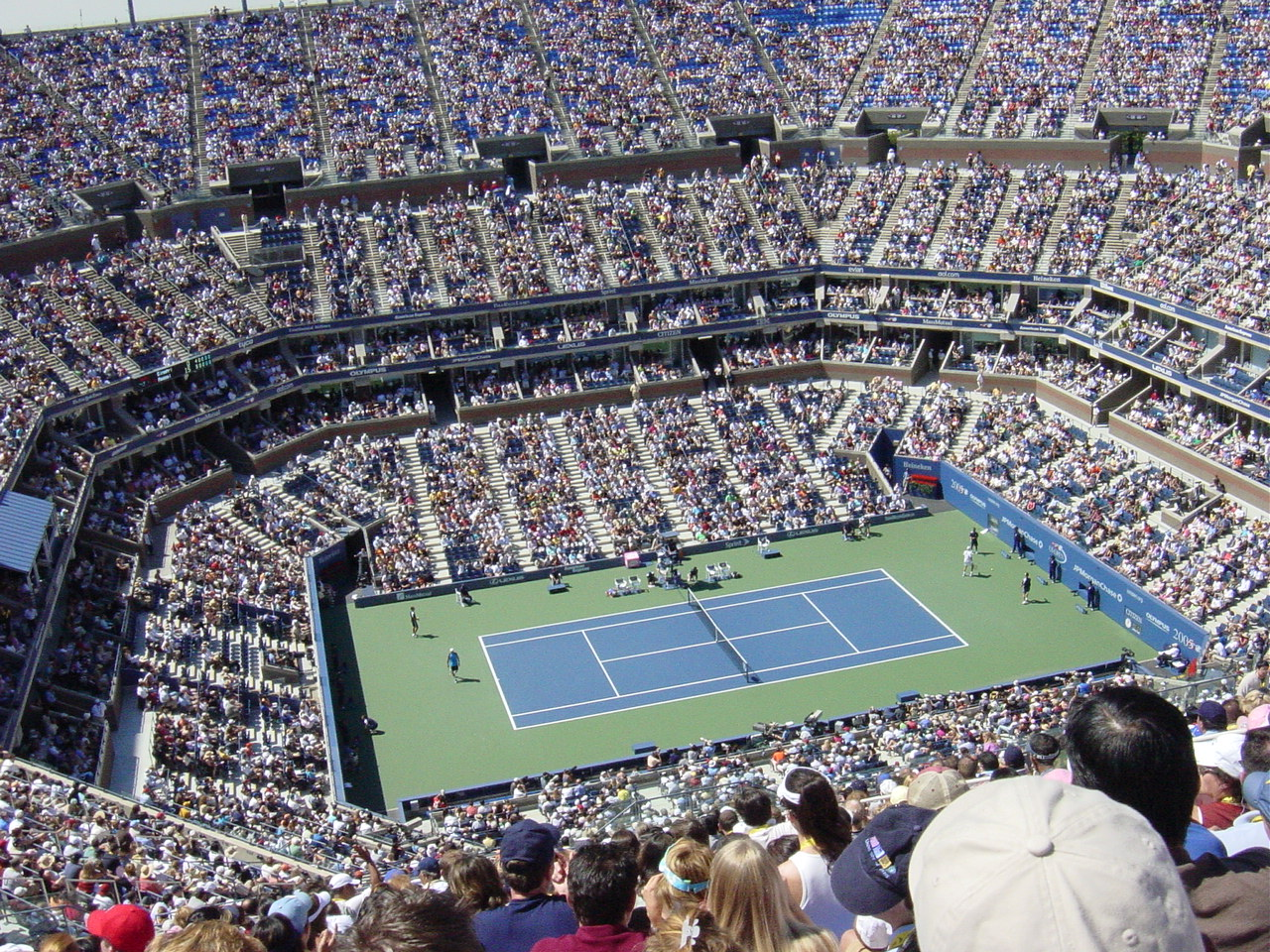
Arthur Ashe Stadium interior, US Open 2005

The idea of the tennis center came about in January 1977, when William Hester, the then-incoming president of the USTA, saw the underused Singer Bowl on a flight into nearby LaGuardia Airport. He asked the City of New York to let him use the stadium and adjoining land for a tennis facility to host the U.S. Open. The stadium was heavily renovated and divided into two venues: Louis Armstrong Stadium and the adjoining grandstand. The National Tennis Center opened in August 1978.

After rumors of a possible move to San Diego, a major upgrade and expansion began in March 1995. During David Dinkins's mayoralty, the city negotiated a 99-year lease of city park space to the United States Tennis Association to create the USTA National Tennis Center. In August 1997 the newly built Arthur Ashe Stadium replaced Louis Armstrong Stadium as the main court. The four-year expansion was completed in 1999. Arthur Ashe Stadium holds more than 22,000 spectators while Louis Armstrong Stadium was downsized to hold just 10,000 spectators (the original size was 18,000). In 2006, at the location of the old indoor tennis building near the East Gate, work began on a 245,000-square-foot, multi-purpose tennis pavilion. The new facility was completed in 2008 and includes 12 courts, classrooms, fitness facilities, and a pro shop. It also includes a hospitality center, museum, and food commissary. Other renovations included the players' lounge, locker rooms, and medical, training and office space.

In 2011, the facility opened a new show court, Court 17, located in the southeast corner of the grounds, seating 2,500 to 3,000, making it small in comparison to the facility's other show courts. Next in size after those courts – Arthur Ashe Stadium, Louis Armstrong Stadium, and the Grandstand (the latter with a capacity of 8,125) – the court has large television screens and Hawk-Eye electronic line-calling capability which allows for player challenges. In constructing the new court, foundations from the 1939 and 1964 World's Fair were discovered, and the water table was found to be several feet higher than expected. Because the playing surface of Court 17 is below ground level, the new court has received the nickname of "The Pit".

Beginning in 2013, the center underwent a $550 million renovation that included the erection of a retractable roof on the Arthur Ashe Stadium, which was completed for the 2016 US Open. A new show court with 8,125 seats was opened in 2016 in the southwest corner of the complex, making it the third-largest court in the center (replacing the old Grandstand court). A new, 14,000-seat Louis Armstrong Stadium (also with a retractable roof) was constructed on the site of the original stadium, and was completed in time for the 2018 US Open.

== Main courts ==
Stadium	Capacity
Arthur Ashe Stadium	23,771
Louis Armstrong Stadium	14,000
Grandstand	8,125
Stadium 17 ("The Pit")	2,800

== Other uses ==
In July 2008, the USTA Billie Jean King National Tennis Center and Arthur Ashe Stadium hosted its first non-tennis event, when the New York Liberty of the Women's National Basketball Association (WNBA) played in the "Liberty Outdoor Classic: 2008". The game itself was the first professional basketball regular season game played outdoors in the USA, by either men or women. The contest featured the Indiana Fever defeating the New York Liberty.

USTA Billie Jean King National Tennis Center is the site of the annual New York State High School tennis championships, held in May and November. This tournament is sponsored by the New York State Public High School Athletic Association (NYSPHSAA).

In March 2020, due to the COVID-19 pandemic, the city proposed building a temporary 350-bed field hospital in the Billie Jean King National Tennis Center to treat overflow patients from area hospitals. It opened on April 10 and was later described by The New York Times as a "cautionary tale" of mismanaged government responses, having cost at least $52 million while only treating 79 patients until it closed on May 13.

== See also ==
- Sports in New York City § Tennis

Preceded by West Side Tennis Club; 1924–1977	Home of the U.S. Open; 1978–	Succeeded by current venue
