= Stadium 17 =

Tennis stadium in Queens, New York

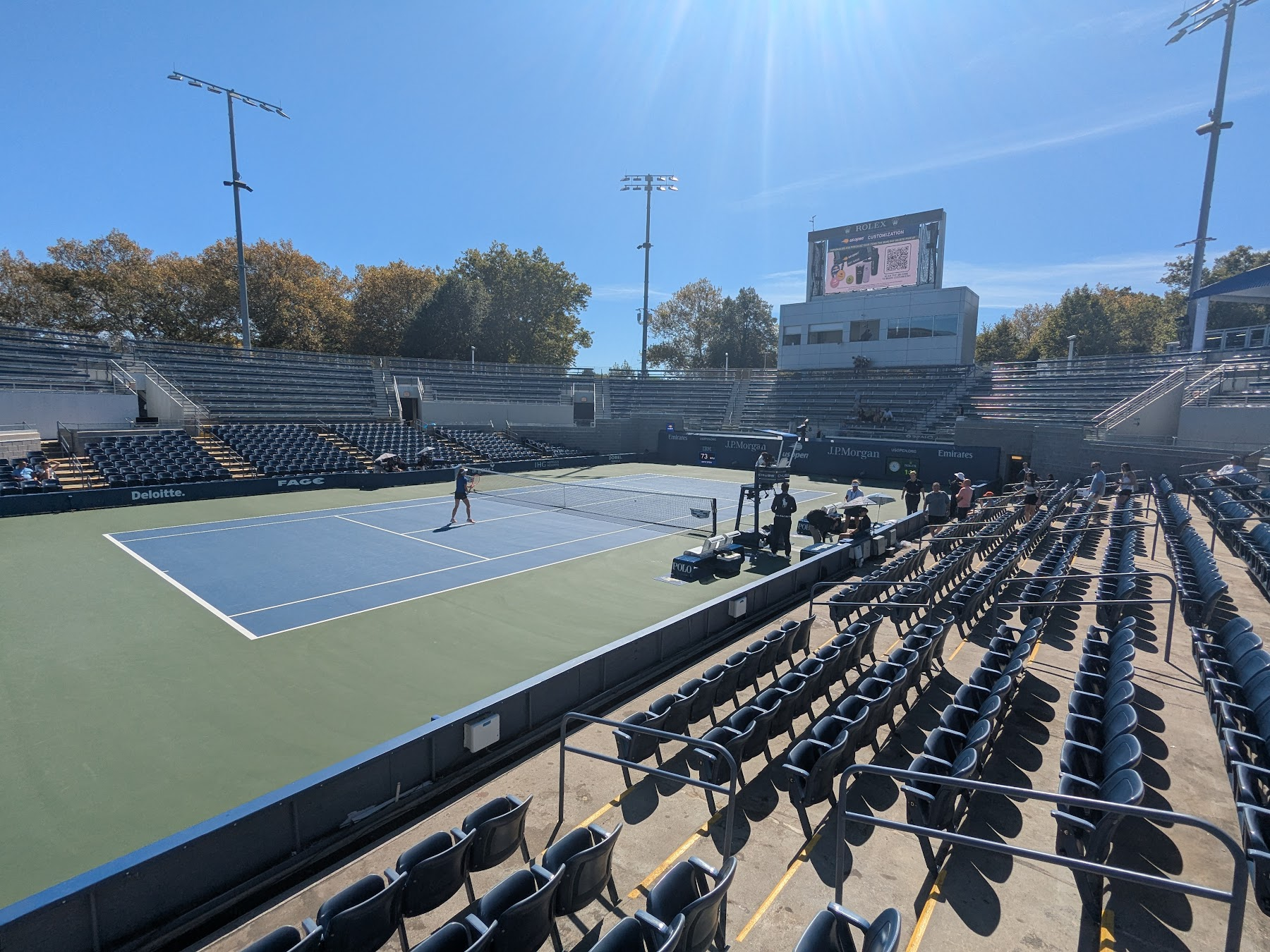
- Stadium 17, prior to a match at the 2025 US Open.
- Interactive map of Stadium 17
- Location: USTA Billie Jean King National Tennis Center, Flushing, Queens, New York City
- Coordinates: 40.749189°N 73.844553°W
- Capacity: 2,800
- Surface: DecoTurf (2011–2019); Laykold (2020–)
- Public transit: Long Island Rail Road (LIRR): Port Washington Branch at Mets–Willets Point; New York City Subway: trains at Mets–Willets Point; New York City Bus: Q90

Construction
- Opened: August 29th, 2011

Tenant
- US Open (USTA) (2016–present)

Stadium 17, often referred to as "The Pit," is the fourth-largest court and the smallest show court at the USTA Billie Jean King National Tennis Center. The stadium was unveiled at the 2011 US Open as "Court 17" in the former location of two outer courts, which were combined to create a larger show court. The first match featured Richard Gasquet defeating Sergiy Stakhovsky 6-4, 6-4, 6-0.

During excavation for Stadium 17, officials say they encountered concrete footings from the 1939 and 1964 World's Fairs. The water table was also a foot or two higher than anticipated. This led to the court sitting 8 feet (2.4 m) below ground level, giving rise to the court's nickname. The stadium has gained a reputation for more raucous crowds, becoming a favorite of spectators with grounds passes during the early rounds. The stadium remains the only show court at the US Open without reserved seating.

In 2025, officials opened "The Loft Bar @ 17," a shaded bar at the top of Stadium 17 with standing-room views of the court.
