= US Open (tennis) =

Hard-court tennis tournament

- Official website
- Founded: 1881, 145 years ago
- Editions: 146 (2026)
- Location: Queens, New York City; United States
- Venue: USTA Billie Jean King National Tennis Center (since 1978)
- Surface: Hard (Note: DecoTurf was used from 1978 to 2019, and Laykold since 2020.) – outdoors (Note: Except Arthur Ashe Stadium and Louis Armstrong Stadium during rain delays.) (since 1978); Clay – outdoors (1975–1977); Grass – outdoors (1881–1974)
- Prize money: US$108,000,000 (2026)

Men's
- Draw: S (128Q) / 64D (16Q) (Note: In the main draws, there are 128 singles players (S) and 64 doubles teams (D), and there are 128 and 16 entrants in the respective qualifying (Q) draws.)
- Current champions: Alexander Zverev (singles); Christian Harrison; Neal Skupski (doubles)
- Most singles titles: 7 William Larned, Richard Sears, Bill Tilden
- Most doubles titles: 6 Mike Bryan

Women's
- Draw: S (128Q) / 64D (16Q)
- Current champions: Elena Rybakina (singles); Kateřina Siniaková; Taylor Townsend (doubles)
- Most singles titles: 8 Molla Mallory
- Most doubles titles: 13; Margaret Osborne duPont

Mixed doubles
- Draw: 16
- Current champions: Karolína Muchová; Jakub Menšík
- Most titles (male): 4 Bill Tilden; Bill Talbert; Bob Bryan
- Most titles (female): 9 Margaret Osborne duPont

Grand Slam
- Australian Open; French Open; Wimbledon; US Open

Last completed
- 2026 US Open

The US Open Tennis Championships, commonly called the US Open (stylized in all lowercase), is a hardcourt tennis tournament organized by the United States Tennis Association annually in Queens, New York City. It is chronologically the fourth and final of the four Grand Slam tennis events, held after the Australian Open, French Open, and Wimbledon.

The US Open starts on the Sunday immediately preceding the last Monday of August and continues for two weeks, with the middle weekend coinciding with the United States Labor Day holiday. All players participating must be at least fourteen years old. Since the start of the Open Era of tennis in 1968, the event has been open to both amateur and professional players.

The tournament is one of the oldest tennis championships in the world, originally known as the U.S. National Championships, for which men's singles and men's doubles were first played in August 1881. The tournament originally took place in Newport, Rhode Island, from its inception until 1914. It is the only Grand Slam that was not affected by cancellation due to World War I and World War II, nor interrupted by the COVID-19 pandemic in 2020.

The tournament consists of five primary championships: men's and women's singles, men's and women's doubles, and mixed doubles. The tournament also includes events for senior, junior, and wheelchair players. Since 1978, the tournament has been played on acrylic hardcourts at the USTA Billie Jean King National Tennis Center in Flushing Meadows–Corona Park, Queens, New York City. Revenue from ticket sales, sponsorships, and television contracts is used to develop tennis in the United States.

This tournament, from 1971 to 2021, employed standard tiebreakers (first to seven points, win by two) in every set of a singles match. Since 2022, revised tiebreak rules were initiated and standardized in the final set for all four majors, where if a match reaches six-all in the final set (the third for women and fifth for men), an extended tiebreaker (first to ten points, win by two) is played. The introduction of the extended tiebreaker in 2022 was part of a broader effort to standardize play across the Grand Slam tournaments, ensuring consistency in how matches are decided while also addressing player fatigue and match duration.

== History ==
=== 1881–1914: Newport Casino ===
The tournament was first held in August 1881 on grass courts at the Newport Casino in Newport, Rhode Island, which is now home to the International Tennis Hall of Fame. That year, only clubs that were members of the United States National Lawn Tennis Association (USNLTA) were permitted to enter. Richard Sears won the men's singles at this tournament, which was the first of his seven consecutive singles titles. From 1884 through 1911, the tournament used a challenge system whereby the defending champion automatically qualified for the next year's final, where he would play the winner of the all-comers tournament.

Only men competed in the U.S. National Championships from 1881 to 1886. It had both a singles and doubles division. The first U.S. Women's National Singles Championship was held at the Philadelphia Cricket Club in 1887. The winner was 17-year-old Philadelphian Ellen Hansell. In that same year, the men's doubles event was played at the Orange Lawn Tennis Club in South Orange, New Jersey.

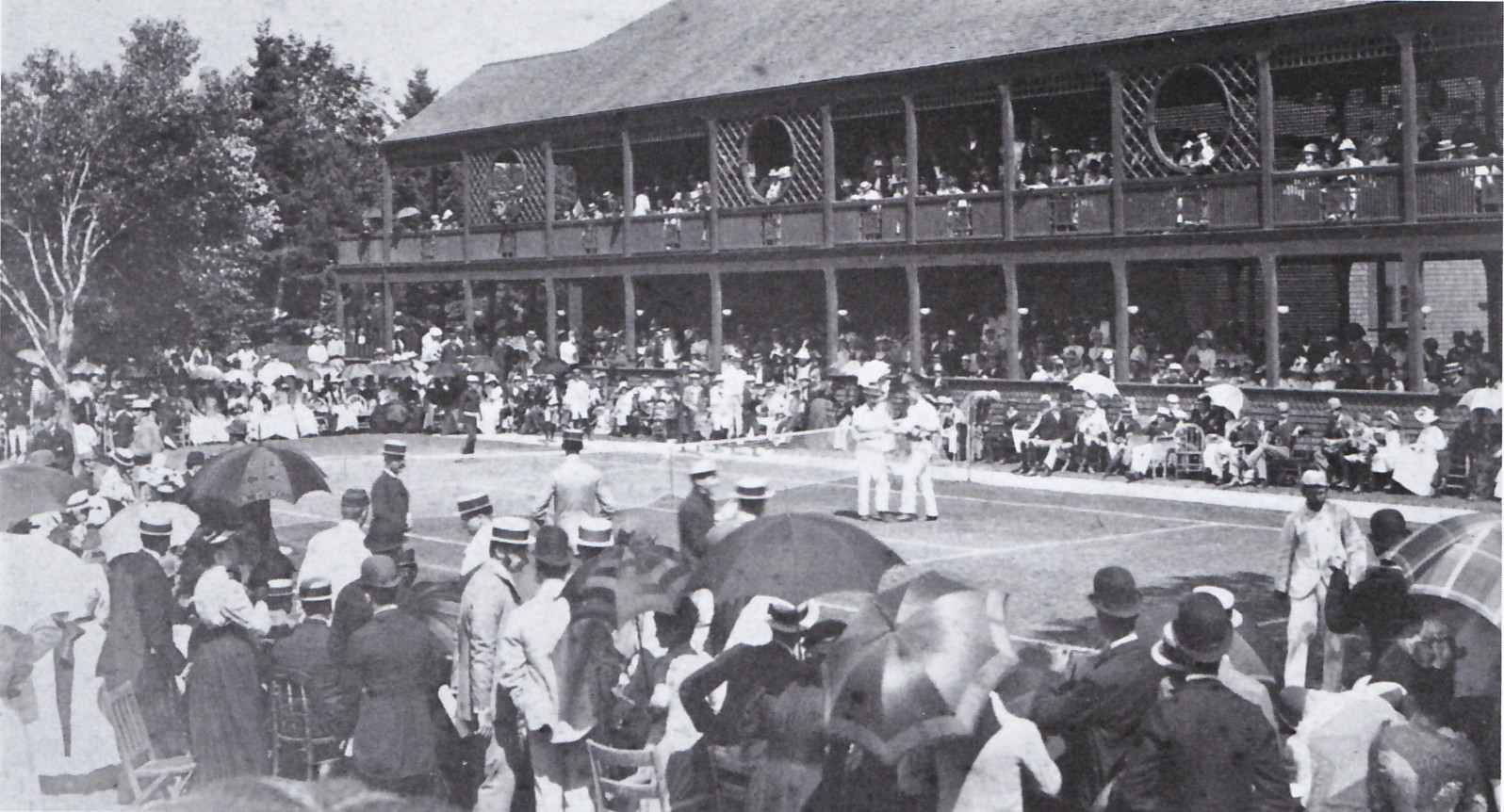
Semifinal at the 1890 U.S. Tennis Championships at Newport, Rhode Island. Match between Oliver Campbell and Bob Huntington

The women's tournament used a challenge system from 1888 through 1918, except in 1917. Between 1890 and 1906, sectional tournaments were held in the east and the west of the country to determine the best two doubles teams, which competed in a play-off for the right to compete against the defending champions in the challenge round.

The 1888 and the 1889 men's doubles events were played at the Staten Island Cricket Club in Livingston, Staten Island, New York. In the 1893 Championships, the men's doubles event was played at the St. George Cricket Club in Chicago. In 1892, the US Mixed Doubles Championship was introduced and, in 1899, the US Women's National Doubles Championship.

In 1915, the national championships was relocated to the West Side Tennis Club in Forest Hills, Queens, New York City. The effort to relocate it to New York City began as early as 1911 when a group of tennis players, headed by New Yorker Karl Behr, started working on it.

=== 1915–1977: West Side Tennis Club ===
In early 1915, a group of about 100 tennis players signed a petition in favor of moving the tournament. They argued that most tennis clubs, players, and fans were located in the New York City area and that it would therefore be beneficial for the development of the sport to host the national championships there. This view was opposed by another group of players that included eight former national singles champions. This contentious issue was brought to a vote at the annual USNLTA meeting on February 5, 1915, with 128 votes in favor of and 119 against relocation. In August 1915, the men's singles tournament was held at the West Side Tennis Club, Forest Hills in New York City for the first time, while the women's tournament was held at the Philadelphia Cricket Club in Chestnut Hill, Philadelphia (the women's singles event was not moved until 1921). From 1917 to 1933, the men's doubles event was held at the Longwood Cricket Club in Chestnut Hill, Massachusetts. In 1934, both men's and women's doubles events were held at Longwood Cricket Club.

From 1921 through 1923, the men's singles tournament was played at the Germantown Cricket Club in Philadelphia. It returned to the West Side Tennis Club in 1924 following the completion of the 14,000-seat Forest Hills Stadium. Although many already regarded it as a major championship, the International Lawn Tennis Federation did not officially designate it as one of the world's major tournaments until 1924. At the 1922 U.S. National Championships, the draw seeded players for the first time to prevent the leading players from playing each other in the early rounds. From 1935 to 1941 and 1946 to 1967, the men's and women's doubles were held at the Longwood Cricket Club.

=== Open Era ===
The Open Era began in 1968 when professional tennis players were allowed to compete for the first time at the Grand Slam tournament held at the West Side Tennis Club. The previous U.S. National Championships had been limited to amateur players. Except for mixed doubles, all events at the 1968 national tournament were open to professionals. That year, 96 men and 63 women entered, and prize money totaled $100,000. In 1970, the US Open became the first Grand Slam tournament to use a tiebreaker to decide a set that reached a 6–6 score in games. From 1970 through 1974, the US Open used a best-of-nine-point sudden-death tiebreaker before moving to the International Tennis Federation's (ITF) best-of-twelve points system. In 1973, the US Open became the first Grand Slam tournament to award equal prize money to men and women, with that year's singles champions, John Newcombe and Margaret Court, receiving $25,000 each. Beginning in 1975, following complaints about the surface and its impact on the ball's bounce, the tournament was played on clay courts instead of grass. This was also an experiment to make it more "TV friendly". The addition of floodlights allowed matches to be played at night.

=== Since 1978: USTA National Tennis Center ===
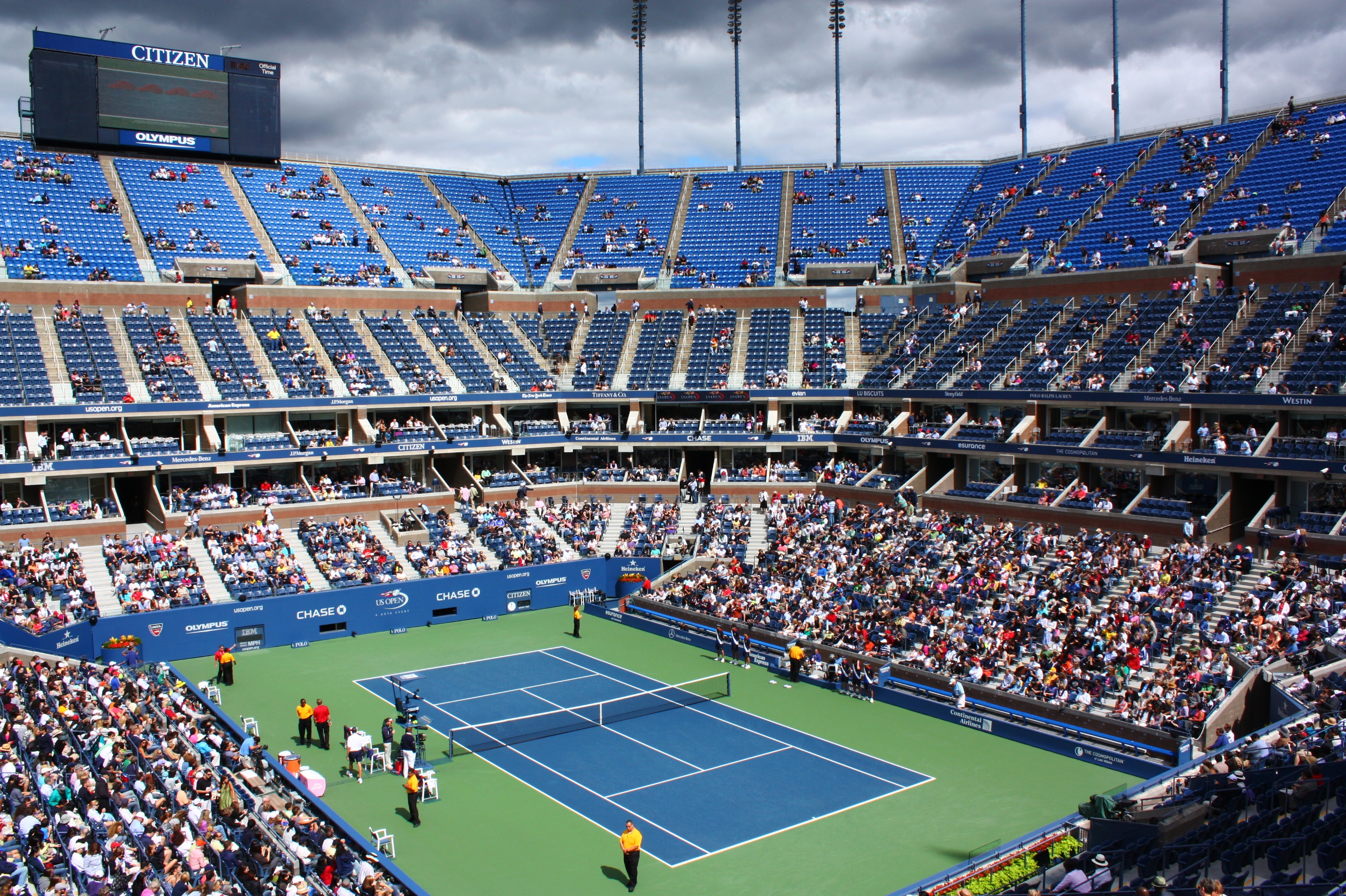
Arthur Ashe stadium in 2010, before the retractable roof was added.

In 1978, the tournament moved from the West Side Tennis Club to the larger and newly constructed USTA National Tennis Center in Flushing Meadows, Queens, 3 miles (4.8 km) to the north. The tournament's court surface also switched from clay to hardcourt. Jimmy Connors is the only individual to have won US Open singles titles on all three surfaces (grass, clay, and hardcourt), while Chris Evert is the only woman to have won US Open singles titles on two surfaces (clay and hardcourt).

The US Open is the only Grand Slam tournament that has been played every year since its inception.

In 2005 the US Open added Wheelchair singles and Wheelchair doubles tournament, while in 2006 the US Open added the Quad singles and Quad doubles tournament. During the 2006 US Open, the complex was renamed to "USTA Billie Jean King National Tennis Center" in honor of Billie Jean King, a four-time US Open singles champion and one of women's tennis's early pioneers.

With the move to Flushing, the women's final was played between the two men's semi-finals on Saturday, creating a block that came to be known as "Super Saturday". While fan-friendly, the concept proved divisive among players because it gave them less than a day's rest between the semifinal and championship matches. A number of spectators also tended to leave after the women's final, and not stay for the second men's semifinal.

This ended in 2001, when the women's final was moved to prime time to encourage television viewership, citing a major growth in popularity for women's tennis among viewers. This practice was eventually discontinued, and the women's final is currently played in the late afternoon.

For five consecutive tournaments between 2008 through 2012, the men's final was postponed to Monday due to weather. In 2013 and 2014, the USTA intentionally scheduled the men's final on a Monday—a move praised for allowing the men's players an extra day's rest following the semifinals, but which drew the ire of the ATP for further deviating from the structure of the other Grand Slams.

In 2015, the US Open returned to a format similar to the other Grand Slams, with women's and men's finals on Saturday and Sunday, and players having an extra day of rest. However, weather delays forced both sets of semifinals to be held on Friday of that year. The men's finals are once again held on Sunday.

In 2018, the tournament was the first Grand Slam tournament that introduced the shot clock to keep a check on the time consumed by players between points. (Note: Once the chair umpire has announced the score following the previous point, the countdown starts and players have 25 seconds to begin their service motion. However, the chair umpire has the ability and discretion to pause or reset the clock to 25 seconds the clock if a point with a particularly long rally merits a pause for the players to recover their breath. In normal circumstances during the game, if the player has not started the service motion at the completion of the 25-second countdown, the chair umpire issues a time violation. The server will receive a warning and for each subsequent violation, the player loses a first serve (second serves are supposed to happen without delay, so the clock won't be used). In the case of the receiver, if it isn't ready at the end of 25 seconds, the chair umpire first issues a warning, then the loss of a point with every other violation. After even-numbered games, the chair umpire will start the clock when the balls are all in place on the server's end of the court.) The reason for this change was to increase the pace of play. The clock is placed in a position visible to players, the chair umpire and fans. Since 2020, all Grand Slams, ATP, and WTA tournaments apply this technology.

In 2019, the tournament marked the last time that five-time champion Roger Federer participated. Rafael Nadal won men's singles defeating Daniil Medvedev.

In 2020, the event was held without spectators due to the COVID-19 pandemic; the Western & Southern Open was also re-located from Cincinnati in order to create a bio-secure bubble for both events due to their proximity. An announcement that the wheelchair tennis competition would not be held caused controversy, because the USTA did not consult with athletes prior to it, as it had with the players' organizations for the able-bodied competitions. After accusations of discrimination, the USTA was forced to backtrack, admitting that it should have discussed the decision with the wheelchair competitors and offering them either $150,000 to be split between them (compared with $3.3m to be split between the players affected by the cancellation of each of the men's and women's qualifying competition and reductions in the mixed-doubles pool), a competition as part of the Open with 95% of the 2019 prize fund, or a competition to be held at the USTA base in Florida.

In 2023, the tournament became the first grand slam tournament to introduce the Video Review system in which players could challenge specific judgement calls made by a chair umpire in a match, such as if a ball bounced twice.

In January 2025, it was announced that the US Open would switch to a Sunday start, leaving Wimbledon as the only Major to begin on a Monday.

== Grounds ==
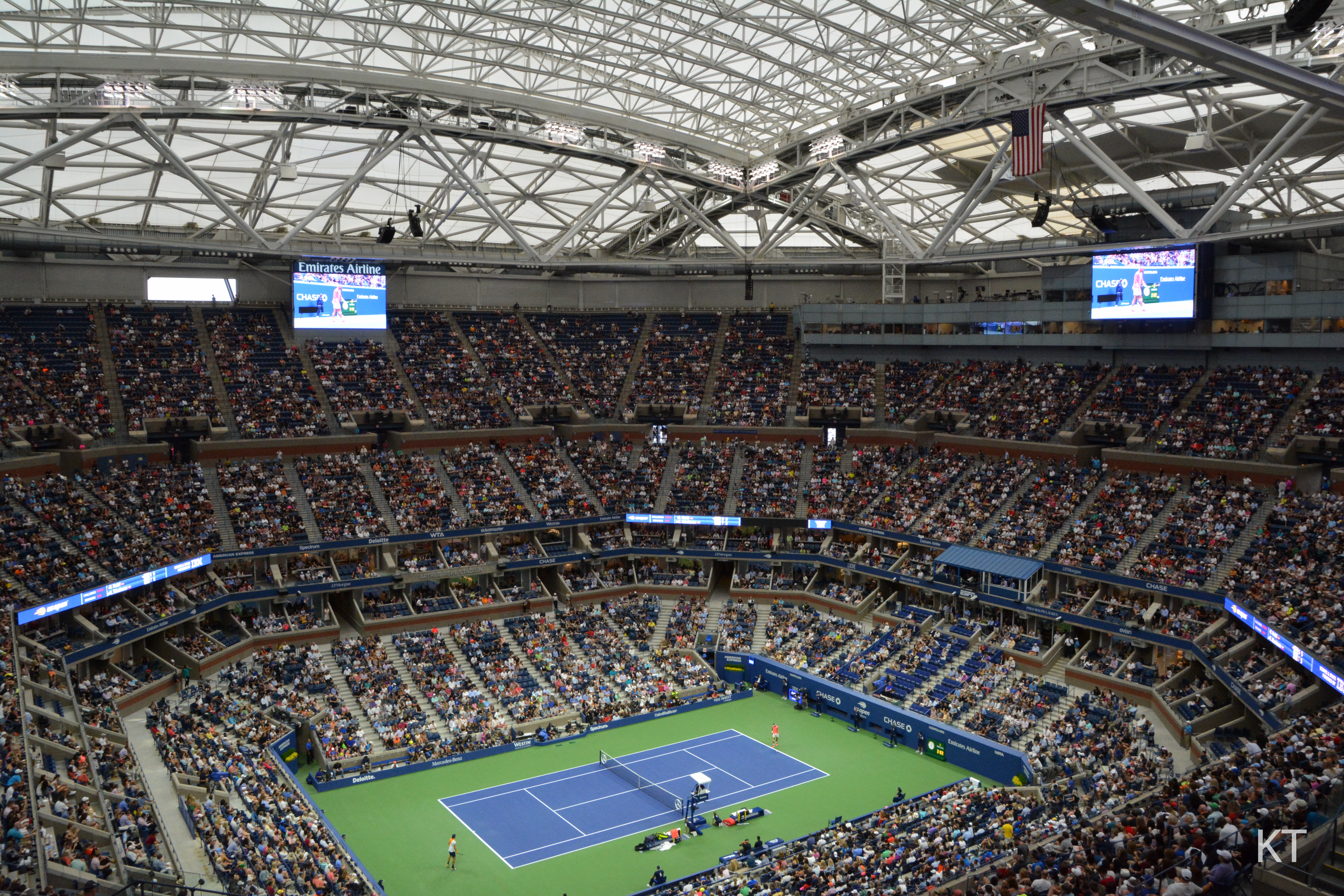
Arthur Ashe Stadium with the roof closed in 2018.

The grounds of the US Open have 22 outdoor courts (plus 12 practice courts just outside the East Gate) consisting of four "show courts" (Arthur Ashe Stadium, Louis Armstrong Stadium, the Grandstand, and Court 17), 13 field courts, and 5 practice courts.

The main court is the 23,771-seat Arthur Ashe Stadium, which opened in 1997. A US$180 million retractable roof was added in 2016. The stadium is named after Arthur Ashe, who won the men's singles title at the inaugural US Open in 1968, and was inducted into the International Tennis Hall of Fame in 1985. The next largest court is the 14,061-seat Louis Armstrong Stadium, which cost US$200 million to build and opened in 2018. The 6,400-seat lower tier of this stadium is separately ticketed, reserved seating while the 7,661-seat upper tier is general admission and not separately ticketed. The third largest court is the 8,125-seat Grandstand in the southwest corner of the grounds, which opened in 2016. Court 17 in the southeast corner of the grounds is the fourth largest stadium. It opened with temporary seating in 2011 and received its permanent seating the following year. It has a seating capacity of 2,800, all of which is general admission and not separately ticketed. It is nicknamed "The Pit", partly because the playing surface is sunk 8 feet into the ground. The total seating capacity for practice courts P1-P5 is 672 and for competition Courts 4–16 is 12,656, itemized as follows:

- Courts 11 & 12: 1,704 each
- Court 7: 1,494
- Court 5: 1,148
- Courts 10 & 13: 1,104 each
- Court 4: 1,066
- Court 6: 1,032
- Court 9: 624
- Courts 14 & 15: 502 each
- Courts 8 & 16: 336 each

All the courts used by the US Open are illuminated, allowing matches and television coverage to extend into the evening.

=== Surface ===
From 1978 to 2019, the US Open was played on a hardcourt surface called Pro DecoTurf. It is a multi-layer cushioned surface and classified by the International Tennis Federation as medium-fast. Each August before the start of the tournament, the courts are resurfaced. In March 2020, the USTA announced that Laykold would become the new court surface supplier beginning with the 2020 tournament.

Since 2005, all US Open and US Open Series tennis courts have been painted a shade of blue (trademarked as "US Open Blue") inside the lines to make it easier for players, spectators, and television viewers to see the ball. The area outside the lines is still painted "US Open Green".

=== Player line call challenges ===
In 2006, the US Open introduced instant replay reviews of line calls, using the Hawk-Eye computer system. It was the first Grand Slam tournament to use the system. The Open felt the need to implement the system because of the controversial quarterfinal match at the 2004 US Open between Serena Williams and Jennifer Capriati, where a number of important line calls went against Williams. Replays on TV showed these calls were incorrect, including one critical point in the match that was incorrectly overruled by the chair umpire. Instant replay was available only on the Arthur Ashe Stadium and Louis Armstrong Stadium courts through the 2008 tournament. In 2009, it became available on the Grandstand court. In 2018, all competition courts were outfitted with Hawk-Eye, and all matches in the main draws (Men's and Women's Singles and Doubles) followed the same procedure, whereby each player was allowed three incorrect challenges per set, with one more given in a tiebreak. Player challenges were eliminated in 2021, when the tournament became the second Grand Slam to fully incorporate Hawk-Eye Live, where all line calls are made electronically; the previous year's tournament had also incorporated Hawk-Eye Live on all courts except for Arthur Ashe and Louis Armstrong stadiums to reduce personnel during the COVID-19 pandemic.

In 2007, JPMorgan Chase renewed its sponsorship of the US Open and, as part of the arrangement, the replay system was renamed to "Chase Review" on in-stadium video and television. Although the challenge system was eliminated in 2021 in favor of Hawk-Eye Live, shots that land marginally "in" or "out" are still shown, now branded as "Chase Close Call".

== Point and prize money distribution ==
Ranking points for the men (ATP) and women (WTA) have varied at the US Open through the years. Below is a series of tables for each of the competitions showing the ranking points on offer for each event:

=== Seniors ===
Event	W	F	SF	QF	R4	R3	R2	R1	Q	Q3	Q2	Q1
Men's singles	2000	1300	800	400	200	100	50	10	30	16	8	0
Men's doubles	2000	1300	800	400	200	100	0	—	—	—	—	—
Women's singles	2000	1300	780	430	240	130	70	10	40	30	20	2
Women's doubles	2000	1300	780	430	240	130	10	—	—	—	—	—

=== Wheelchair ===
Event	W	F	SF	QF	Round of 16
Singles	800	500	375	200	100
Doubles	800	500	375	100	N/A
Quad singles	800	500	375	200	100
Quad doubles	800	500	375	100	N/A

=== Juniors ===
Event	W	F	SF	QF	Round of 16	Round of 32	Q	Q3
Boys' singles	1000	600	370	200	100	45	30	20
Girls' singles	1000	600	370	200	100	45	30	20
Boys' doubles	750	450	275	150	75	—N/a	—N/a	—N/a
Girls' doubles	750	450	275	150	75	—N/a	—N/a	—N/a

=== Prize money ===
The 2026 US Open offered a record $108 million in total player compensation, a 20% increase from the previous record of $90 million in 2025 and the largest player compensation package in professional tennis history.

Of the $108 million total commitment, $101 million was allocated to prize money, with a further $5 million in player stipends and $2 million allocated to a new Player Support Program, split equally between the men's and women's tours. Overall spending on players increased by more than 40% from 2024.

The men's and women's singles champions each received a record $5.5 million, with the runners-up receiving $2.8 million. First-round singles prize money increased by 27% to $140,000, while first-round qualifying prize money increased by 16% to $32,000. The men's and women's doubles champions and mixed doubles champions each received $1 million per team.

Event	W	F	SF	QF	Round of 16	Round of 32	Round of 64	Round of 128	Q3	Q2	Q1
Singles	$5,500,000	$2,800,000	$1,450,000	$780,000	$480,000	$290,000	$190,000	$140,000	$66,000	$48,000	$32,000
Doubles	$1,000,000	$500,000	$250,000	$125,000	$80,000	$50,000	$35,000	N/A			
Mixed doubles	$1,000,000	$500,000	$250,000	$120,000	$40,000	N/A			N/A	$20,000	$10,000

All prize money for the doubles competitions is distributed per team.

In 2012, the USTA agreed to increase the US Open prize money to $50.4 million by 2017. As a result, the prize money for the 2013 tournament was $33.6 million, a record $8.1 million increase from 2012. The champions of the 2013 US Open Series also had the opportunity to add $2.6 million in bonus prize money, potentially bringing the total 2013 US Open purse to more than $36 million. In 2014, the prize money was $38.3 million. In 2015, the prize money was increased to $42.3 million. In 2021, the USTA set a new record for the highest prize money and total player compensation in the tournament's history with $57,462,000 and also boosted the prize money for the qualifying tournament to $6 million, a 66% increase over the package in 2019.

The 2023 tournament saw another record, with total prize money reaching $65 million. Efforts were also undertaken to enhance support for participants across all events by implementing expanded player expense assistance measures. This iteration of the tournament introduced substantial changes in player per diem allowances, extending to all competitors. Travel vouchers worth $1,000 have been newly introduced. Moreover, players can receive an additional hotel room or witness a twofold increase in their daily hotel allowance, which has been raised from $300 to $600, provided they choose alternate lodging. Additionally, an elevation in meal allowances and provision of racquet stringing services are also in effect for all participating players.

In 2026, total player compensation reached a record $108 million, a 20% increase from the $90 million offered in 2025 and a 44% increase over two years. It marked the second consecutive year in which the US Open increased its total player compensation by 20%. The tournament also introduced a new Player Support Program with an initial commitment of $2 million, divided equally between male and female players. The program was designed to complement existing end-of-career pension funds and provide support for mid-career life events and retirement transitions. Eligibility was extended to US Open main-draw singles and doubles competitors without reliance on ranking tiers.

The introduction of the Player Support Program coincided with the formation of a new Grand Slam Player Council by the US Open, Australian Open, Roland-Garros and Wimbledon. The council was established to give players a voice on on-court and in-tournament matters and to provide recommendations to the US Open on how the Player Support Program should be implemented.

== Champions ==
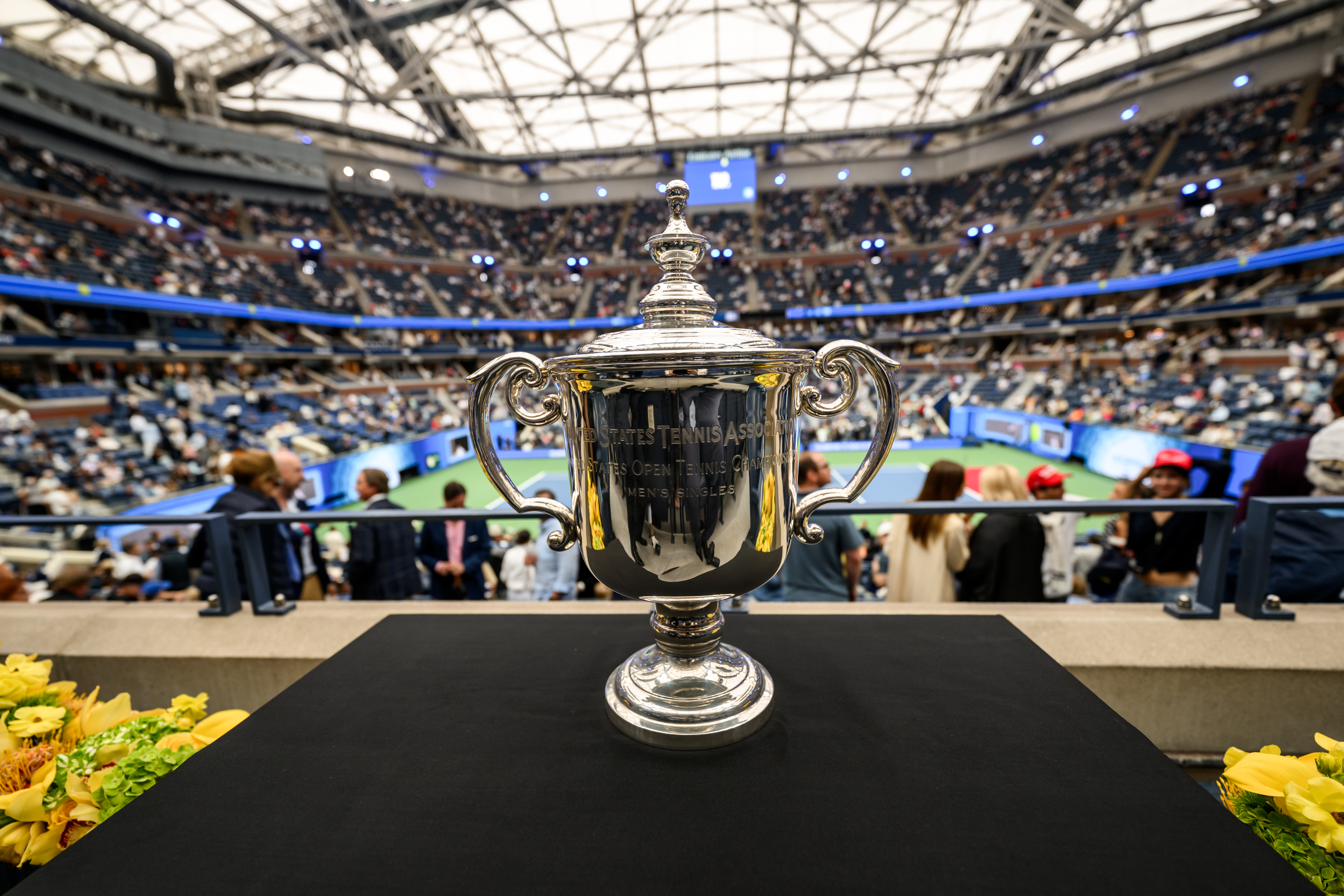
Current Men's singles trophy

=== Former champions ===
- Men's singles
- Women's singles
- Men's doubles
- Women's doubles
- Mixed doubles
- All champions

=== Current champions ===
2025/2026 US Open Championships
Alexander Zverev, the 2026 men's singles champion.

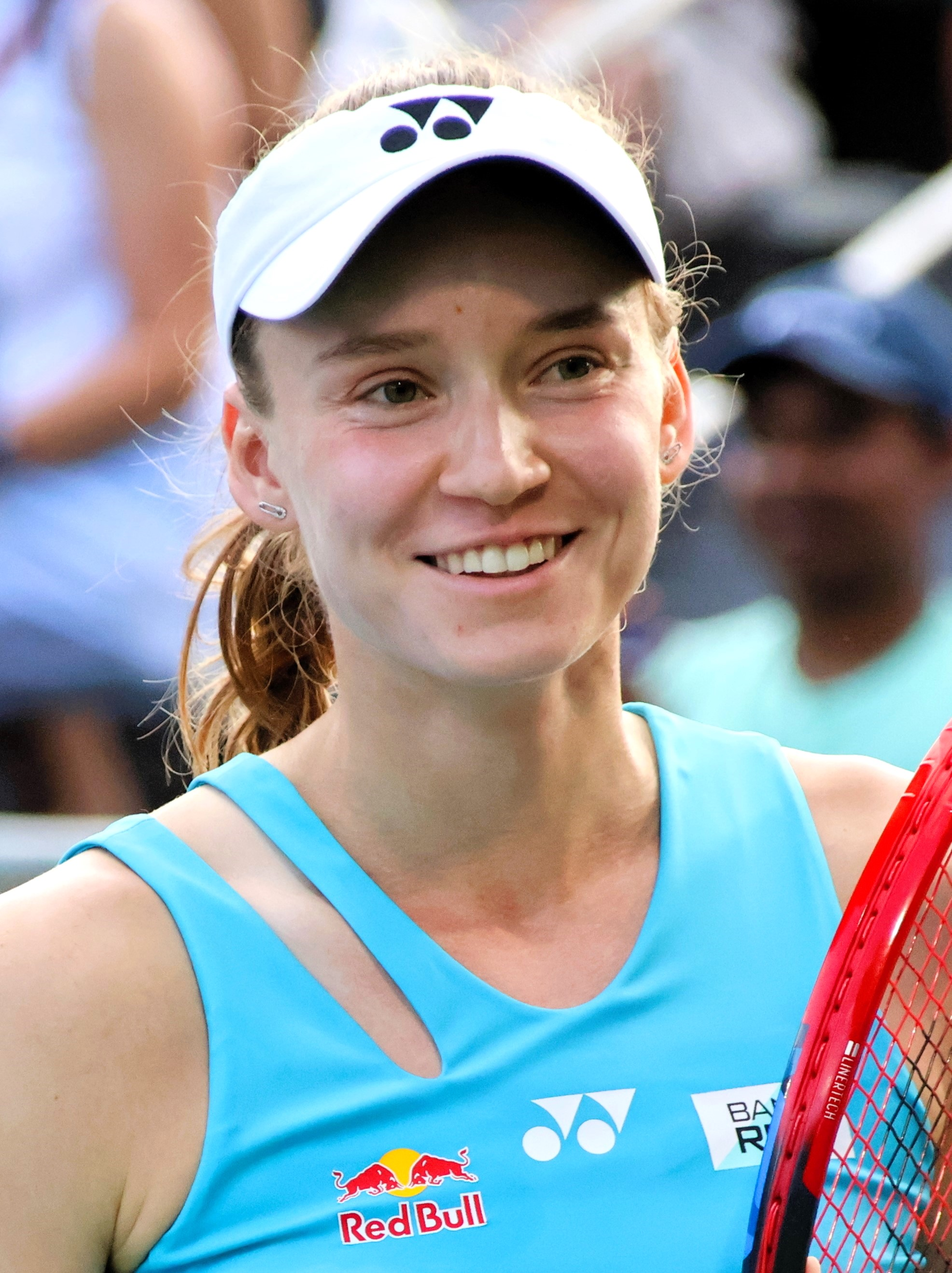
Elena Rybakina, 2026 women's singles champion.

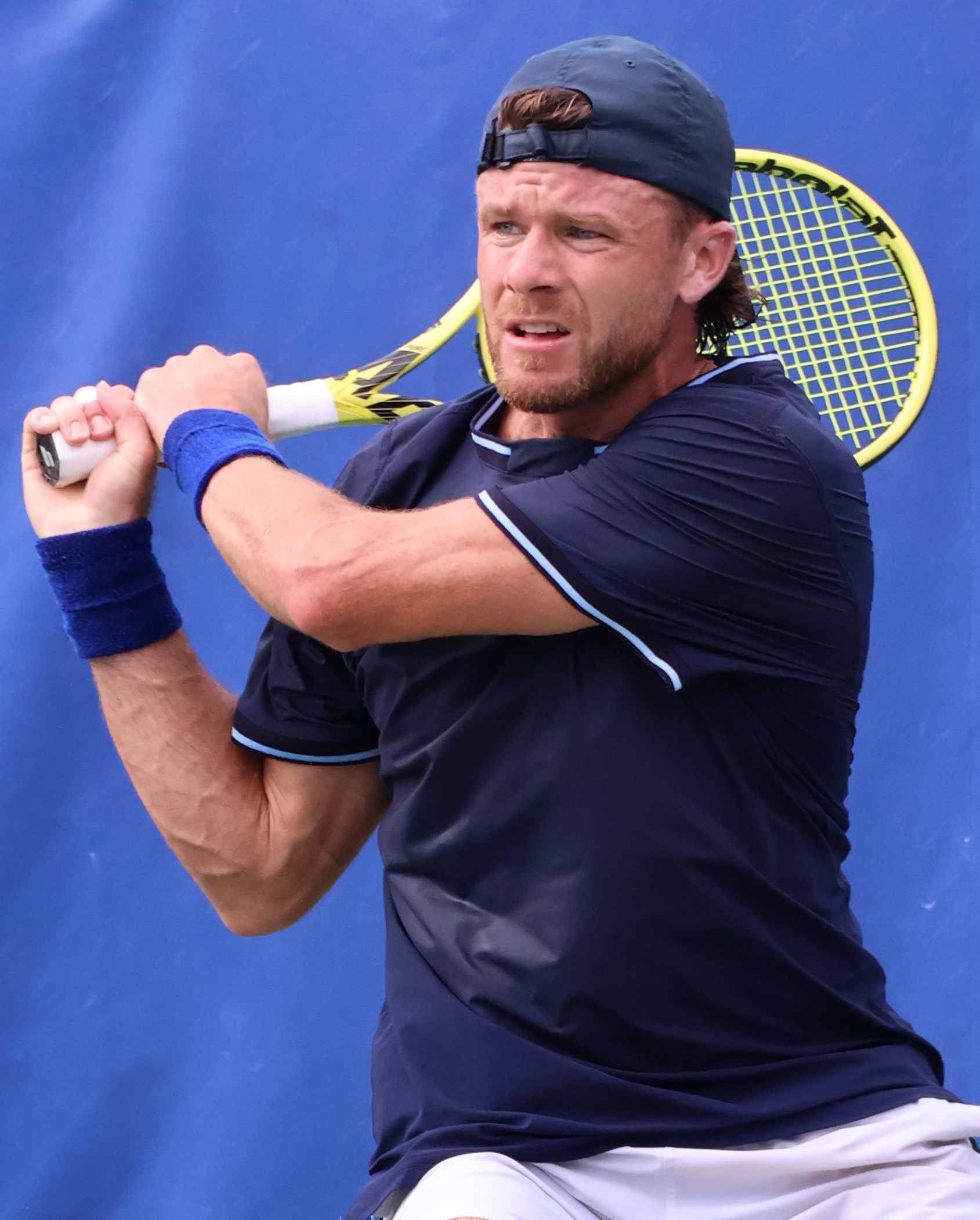
Christian Harrison was part of the 2026 winning men's doubles team.

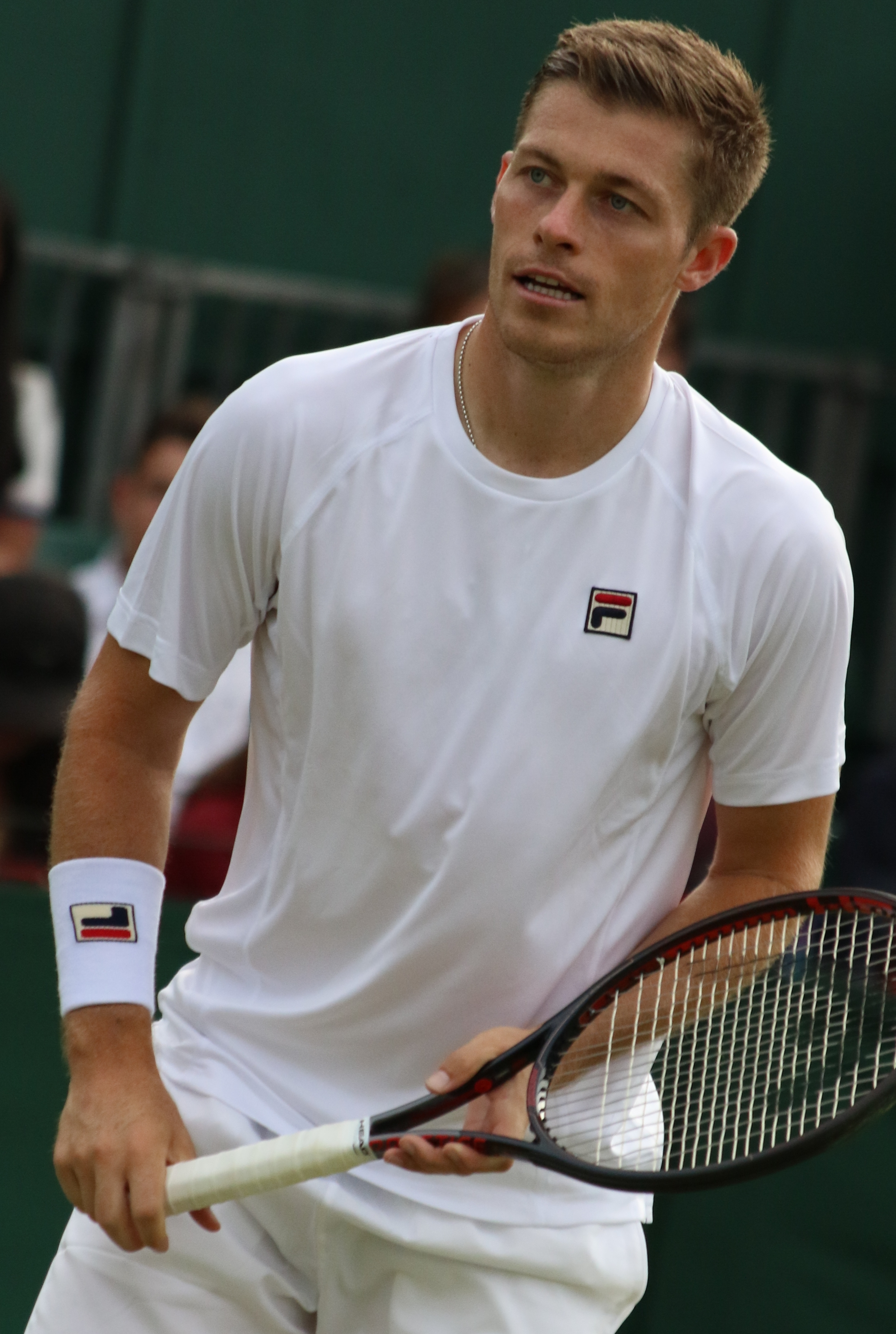
Neal Skupski was part of the 2026 winning men's doubles team.

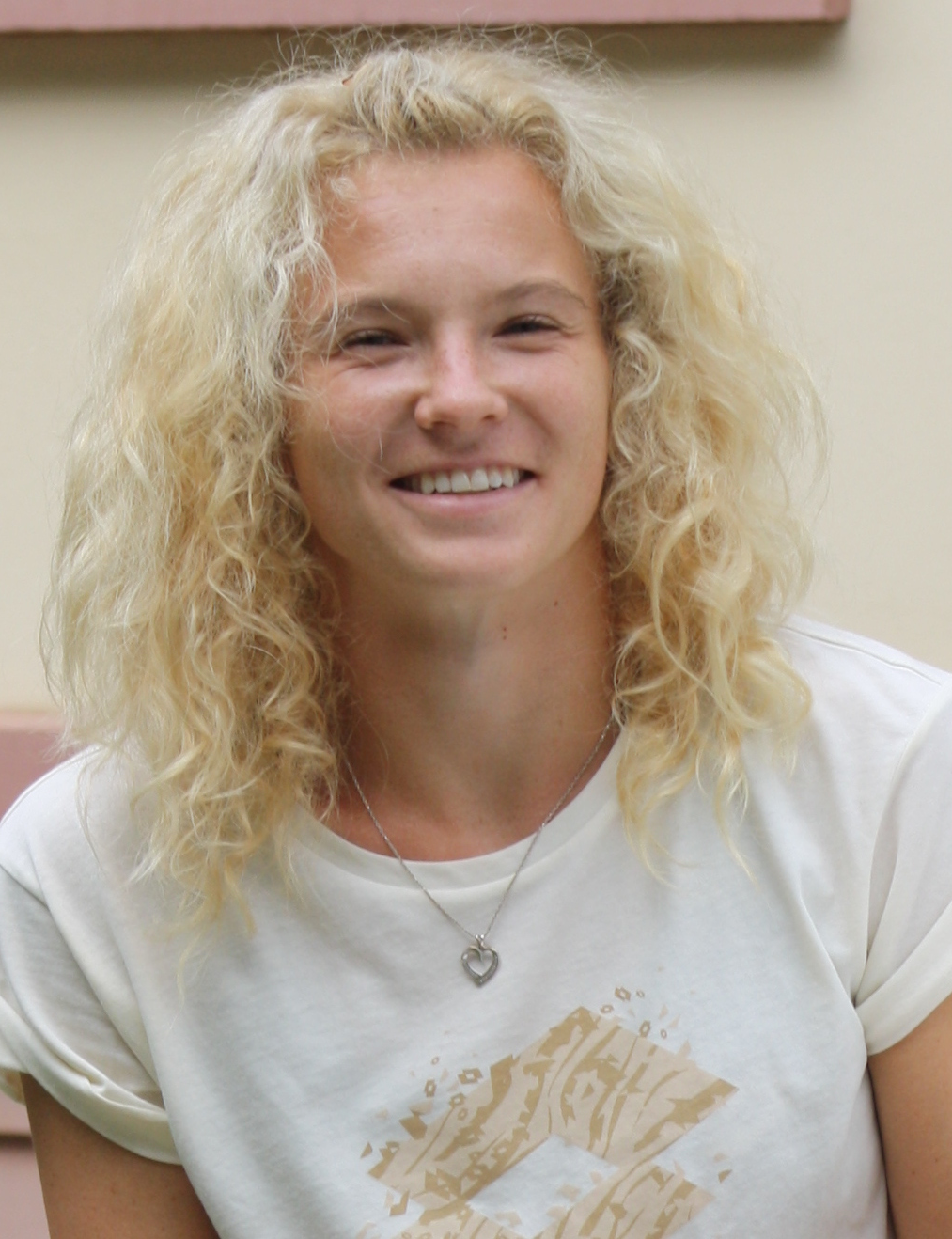
Kateřina Siniaková was part of the 2026 winning women's doubles team.

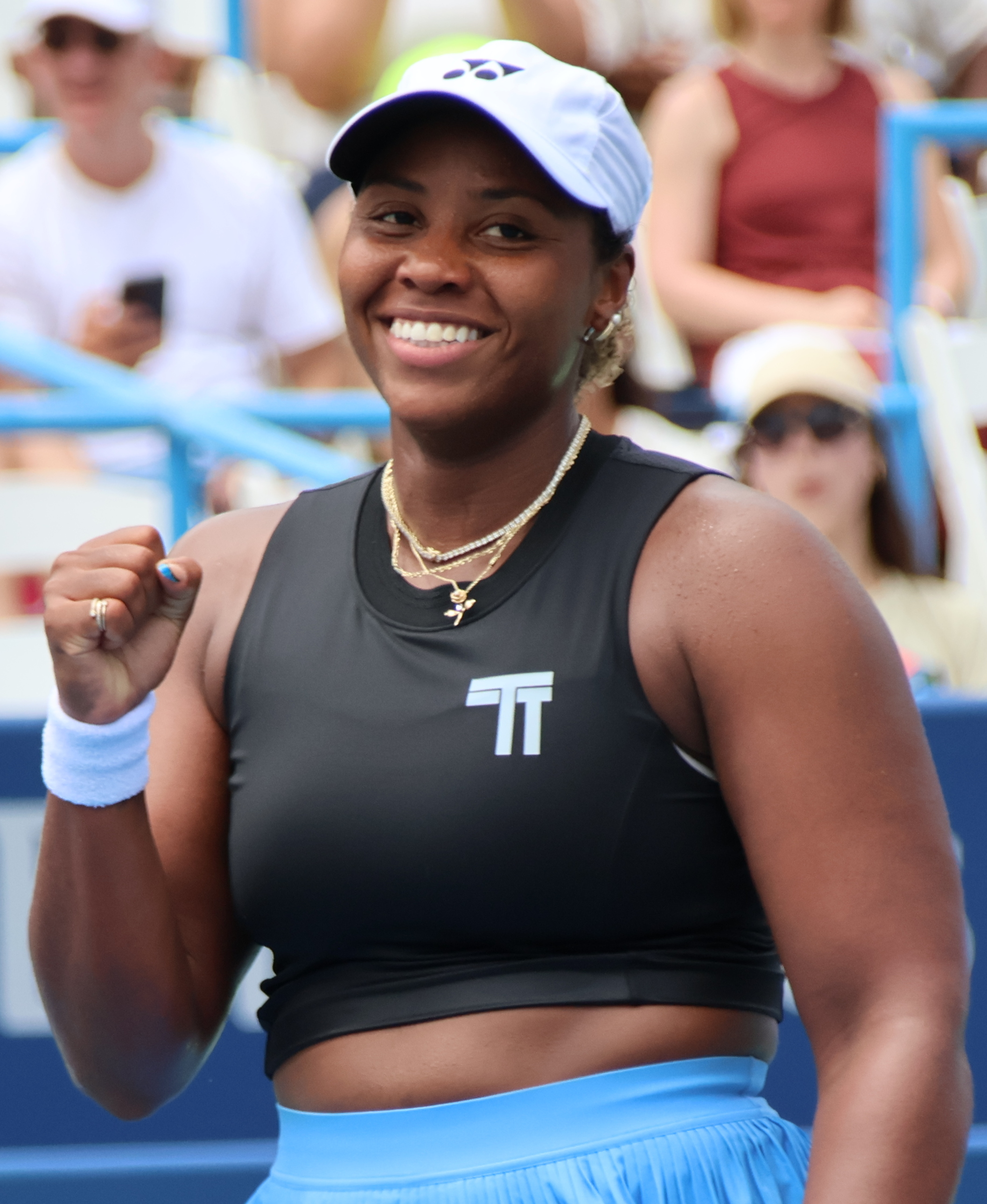
Taylor Townsend was part of the 2026 winning women's doubles team.

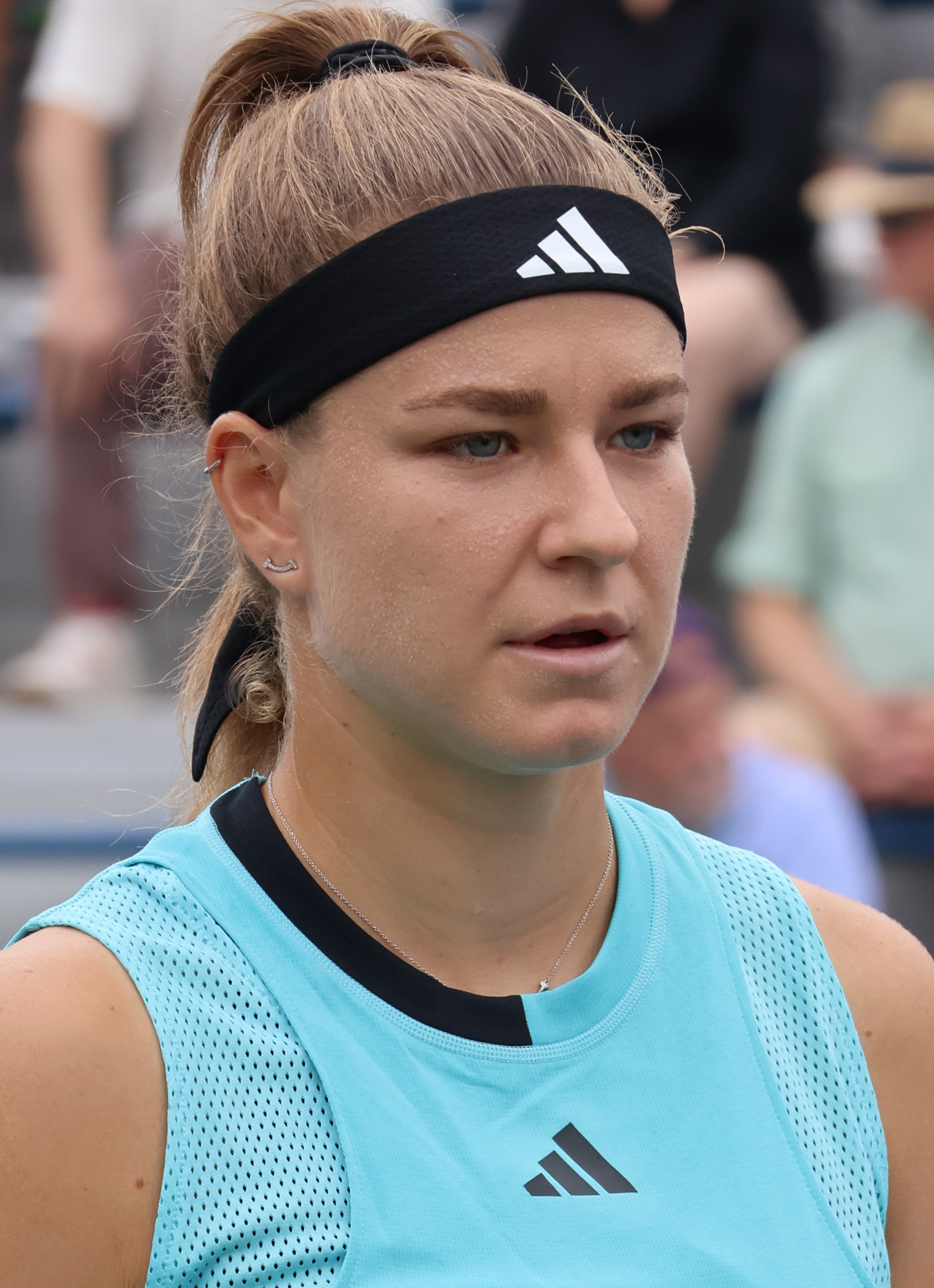
Karolína Muchová was part of the 2026 winning mixed doubles team.

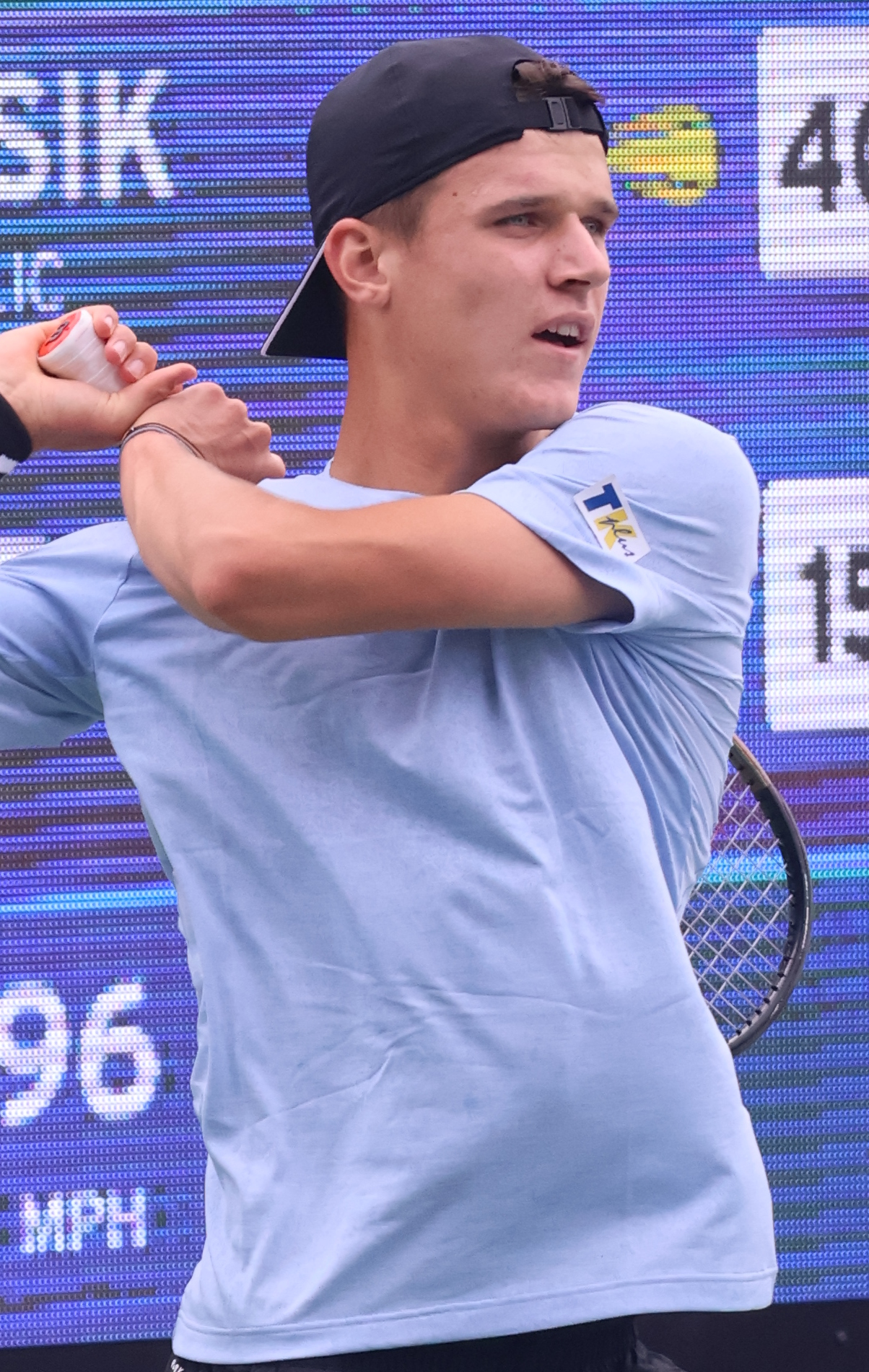
Jakub Menšík was part of the 2026 winning mixed doubles team.

=== Most recent finals ===
2026 Event	Champion	Runner-up	Score
Men's singles	(Germany) Alexander Zverev	(United States) Ben Shelton	6–3, 7–6^{(7–2)}, 5–7, 6–2
Women's singles	(Kazakhstan) Elena Rybakina	(Belarus) Aryna Sabalenka	6–4, 5–7, 6–2
Men's doubles	(United States) Christian Harrison (United Kingdom) Neal Skupski	(Germany) Kevin Krawietz (Germany) Tim Pütz	6–4, 7–6^{(8–6)}
Women's doubles	(Czech Republic) Kateřina Siniaková (United States) Taylor Townsend	(United States) Ashlyn Krueger (United States) Robin Montgomery	5–7, 6–0, 6–2
Mixed doubles	(Czech Republic) Karolína Muchová (Czech Republic) Jakub Menšík	(Switzerland) Belinda Bencic (Italy) Flavio Cobolli	6–3, 1–6, [10–6]

== Records ==
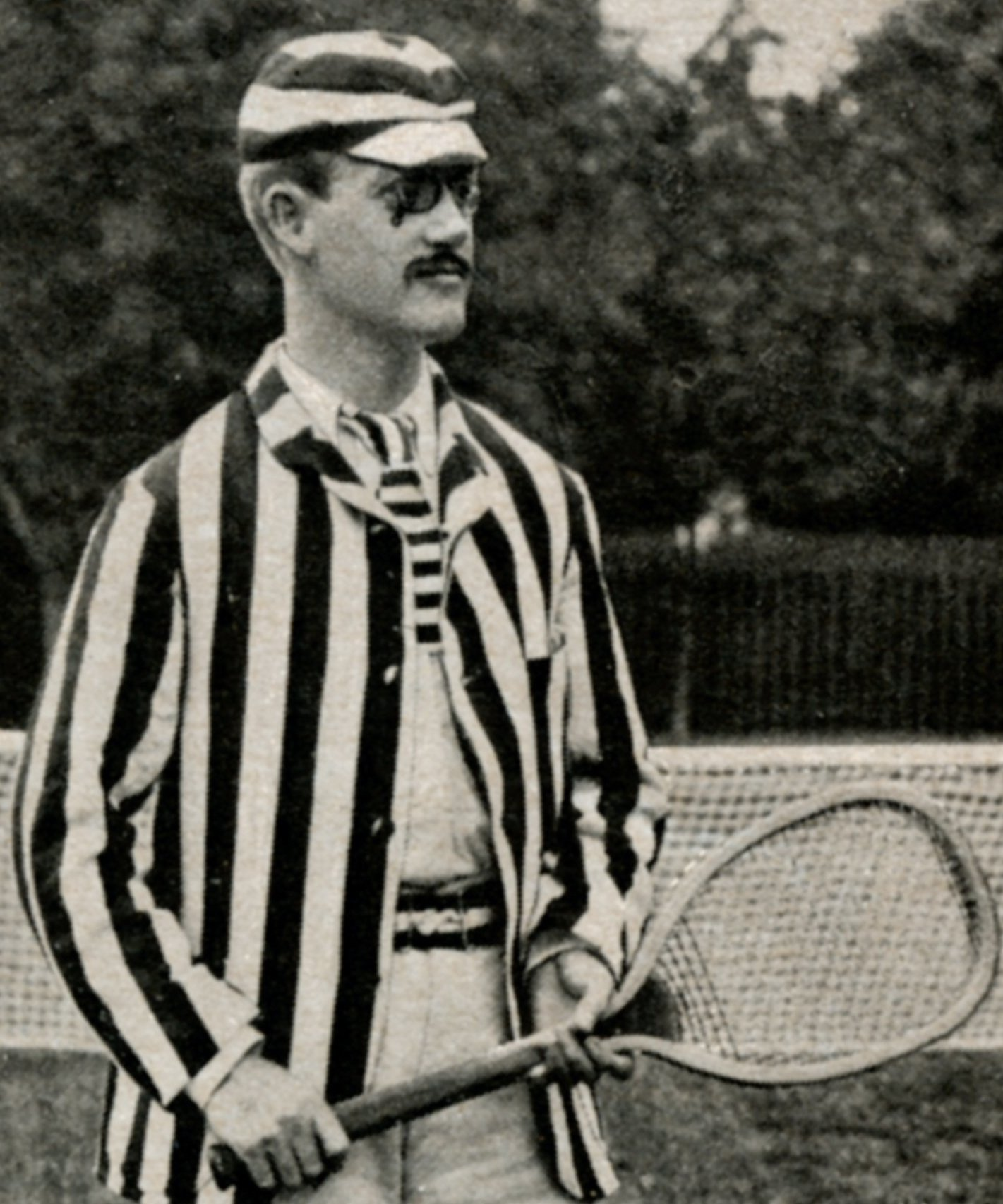
Richard Sears, a joint all-time record-holder in men's singles

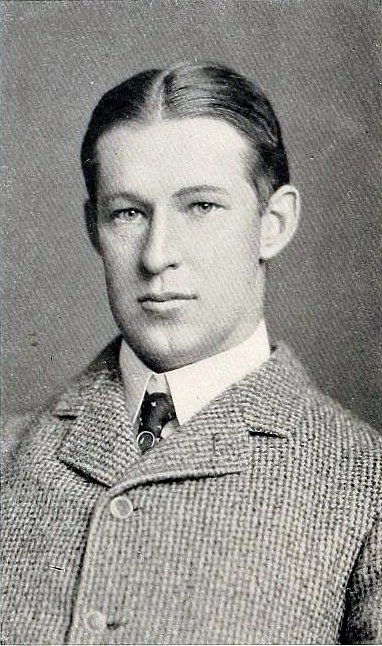
Bill Larned, a joint all-time record holder in men's singles

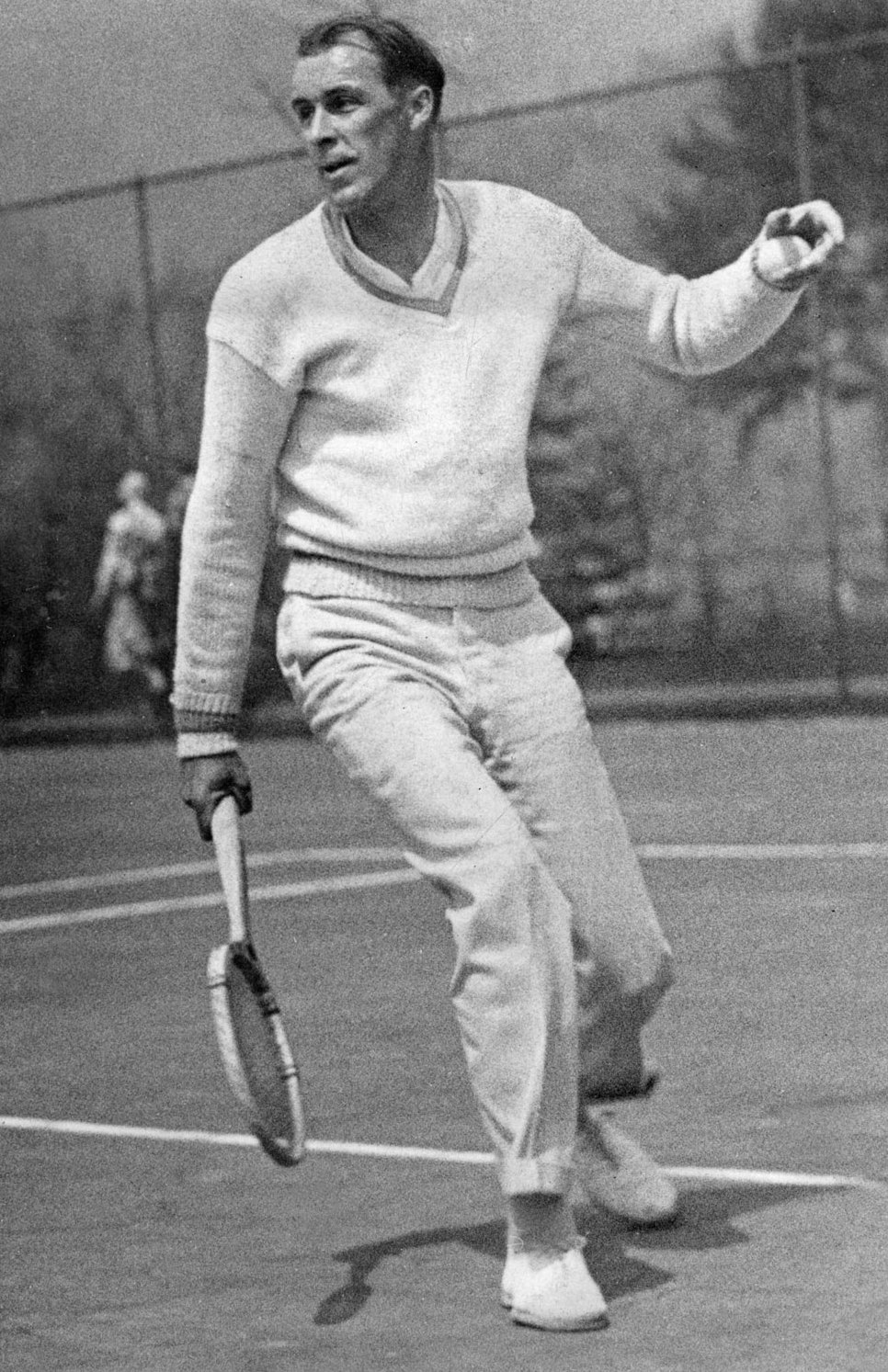
Bill Tilden, a joint all-time record holder in men's singles

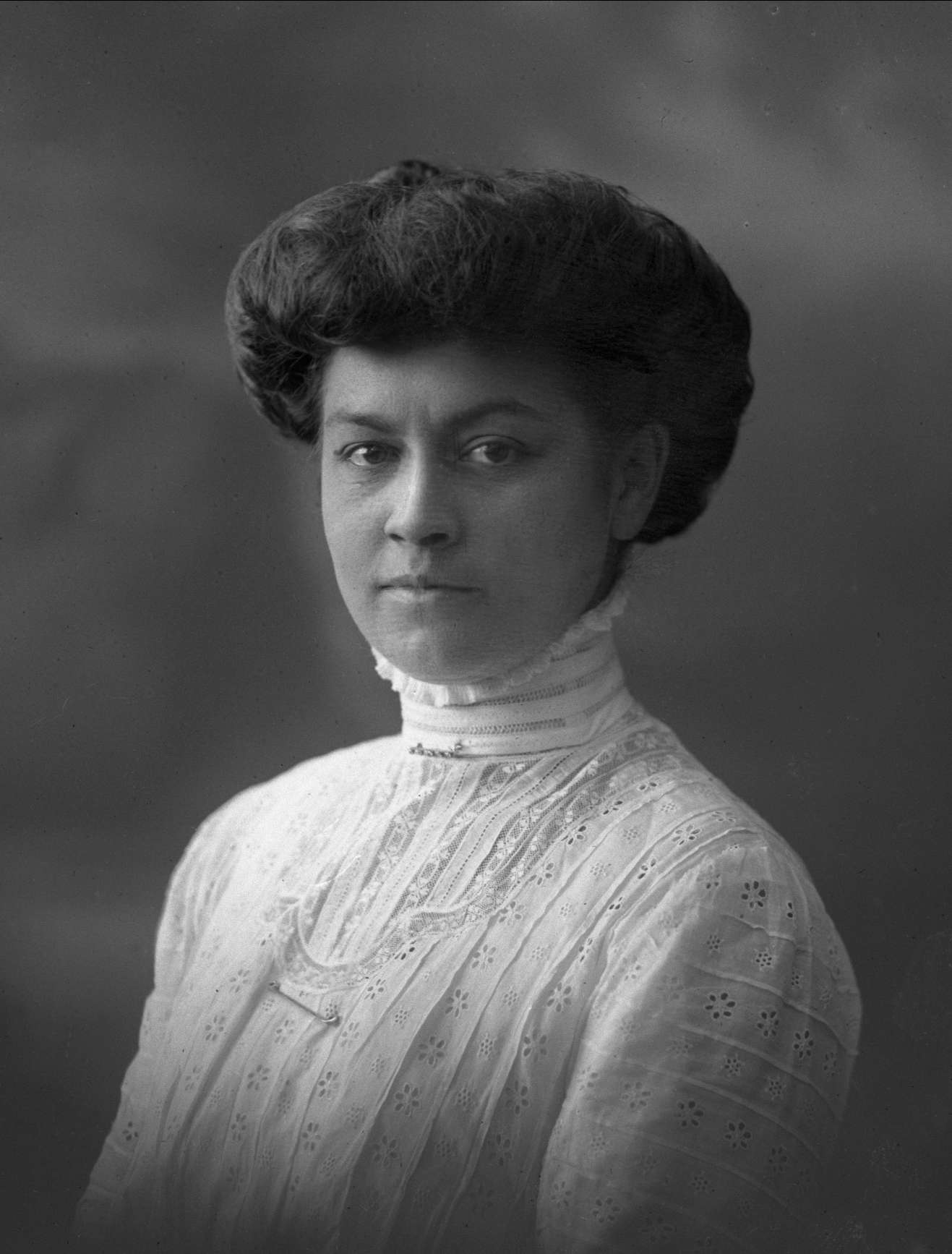
Molla Mallory, the all-time record holder in women's singles

Record	Era	Player(s)	Count	Years
Men since 1881
Most singles titles	Amateur Era	(United States) Richard Sears	7	1881–87
Most singles titles	Amateur Era	(United States) William Larned	7	1901–02, 1907–11
Most singles titles	Amateur Era	(United States) Bill Tilden	7	1920–25, 1929
Most singles titles	Open Era	(United States) Jimmy Connors	5	1974, 1976, 1978, 1982–83
Most singles titles	Open Era	(United States) Pete Sampras	5	1990, 1993, 1995–96, 2002
Most singles titles	Open Era	(Switzerland) Roger Federer	5	2004–08
Most consecutive singles titles	Amateur Era	(United States) Richard Sears	7	1881–87
Most consecutive singles titles	Open Era	(Switzerland) Roger Federer	5	2004–08
Most doubles titles	Amateur Era	(United States) Richard Sears	6	1882–84, 1886–87 with James Dwight; 1885 with Joseph Clark
Most doubles titles	Amateur Era	(United States) Holcombe Ward	6	1899–1901 with Dwight F. Davis; 1904–06 with Beals Wright
Most doubles titles	Open Era	(United States) Mike Bryan	6	2005, 2008, 2010, 2012, 2014 with Bob Bryan; 2018 with Jack Sock
Most consecutive doubles titles	Amateur Era	(United States) Richard Sears	6	1882–87
Most consecutive doubles titles	Open Era	(United States) Rajeev Ram	3	2021–23
Most consecutive doubles titles	Open Era	(United Kingdom) Joe Salisbury	3	2021–23
Most mixed doubles titles	Amateur Era	(United States) Edwin P. Fischer	4	1894–96 with Juliette Atkinson; 1898 with Carrie Neely
Most mixed doubles titles	Amateur Era	(United States) Wallace F. Johnson	4	1907 with May Sayers; 1909, 1911, 1915 with Hazel Hotchkiss Wightman
Most mixed doubles titles	Amateur Era	(United States) Bill Tilden	4	1913–14 with Mary Browne; 1922–23 with Molla Mallory
Most mixed doubles titles	Amateur Era	(United States) Bill Talbert	4	1943–46 with Margaret Osborne duPont
Most mixed doubles titles	Open Era	(Australia) Owen Davidson	4	1966 with Donna Floyd; 1967, 1971, 1973 with Billie Jean King
Most mixed doubles titles	Open Era	(United States) Marty Riessen	4	1969–70, 1972 with Margaret Court; 1980 with Wendy Turnbull
Most mixed doubles titles	Open Era	(United States) Bob Bryan	4	2003 with Katarina Srebotnik; 2004 with Vera Zvonareva; 2006 with Martina Navratilova; 2010 with Liezel Huber
Most Championships (singles, doubles & mixed doubles)	Amateur Era	(United States) Bill Tilden	16	1913–29 (7 singles, 5 doubles, 4 mixed doubles)
Most Championships (singles, doubles & mixed doubles)	Open Era	(United States) Bob Bryan	9	2003–14 (5 doubles, 4 mixed doubles)
Women since 1887
Most singles titles	Amateur Era	(Norway) / (United States) Molla Mallory	8	1915–18, 1920–22, 1926
Most singles titles	Open Era	(United States) Chris Evert	6	1975–78, 1980, 1982
Most singles titles	Open Era	(United States) Serena Williams	6	1999, 2002, 2008, 2012–14
Most consecutive singles titles	Amateur Era	(Norway) / (United States) Molla Mallory	4	1915–18
Most consecutive singles titles	Amateur Era	(United States) Helen Jacobs	4	1932–35
Most consecutive singles titles	Open Era	(United States) Chris Evert	4	1975–78
Most doubles titles	Amateur Era	(United States) Margaret Osborne duPont	13	1941 with Sarah Palfrey Cooke; 1942–50, 1955–57 with Louise Brough
Most doubles titles	Open Era	(United States) Martina Navratilova	9	1977 with Betty Stöve; 1978, 1980 with Billie Jean King; 1983–84, 1986–87 with Pam Shriver; 1989 with Hana Mandlíková; 1990 with Gigi Fernández
Most consecutive doubles titles	Amateur Era	(United States) Margaret Osborne duPont	10	1941 with Sarah Palfrey Cooke; 1942–50 with Louise Brough
Most consecutive doubles titles	Open Era	(Spain) Virginia Ruano Pascual	3	2002–04
Most consecutive doubles titles	Open Era	(Argentina) Paola Suárez	3	2002–04
Most mixed doubles titles	Amateur Era	(United States) Margaret Osborne duPont	9	1943–46 with Bill Talbert; 1950 with Ken McGregor; 1956 with Ken Rosewall; 1958–60 with Neale Fraser
Most mixed doubles titles	Open Era	(Australia) Margaret Court	3	1969–70, 1972 with Marty Riessen
Most mixed doubles titles	Open Era	(United States) Billie Jean King	3	1971, 1973 with Owen Davidson; 1976 with Phil Dent
Most mixed doubles titles	Open Era	(United States) Martina Navratilova	3	1985 with Heinz Günthardt; 1987 with Emilio Sánchez; 2006 with Bob Bryan
Most Championships (singles, doubles & mixed doubles)	Amateur Era	(United States) Margaret Osborne duPont	25	1941–60 (3 singles, 13 doubles, 9 mixed doubles)
Most Championships (singles, doubles & mixed doubles)	Open Era	(United States) Martina Navratilova	16	1977–2006 (4 singles, 9 doubles, 3 mixed doubles)
Wheelchair: singles and doubles since 2005, quads since 2007
Most singles titles	Men	(Japan) Shingo Kunieda	8	2007, 2009–2011, 2014, 2015, 2020, 2021
Most singles titles	Women	(Netherlands) Esther Vergeer (Netherlands) Diede de Groot	6	2005–2007, 2009–2011; 2018–2023
Most singles titles	Quads	(United States) David Wagner (Australia) Dylan Alcott (Netherlands) Niels Vink	3	2010, 2011, 2017; 2015, 2018, 2021; 2022, 2025, 2026
Most consecutive singles titles	Men	(Japan) Shingo Kunieda	4	2007, 2009–2011 (Note: This tournament was not held in 2008 and 2012 due to a clash with the Paralympics. This means that the most years in a row Kunieda has won it is 3 but has won 4 editions of this tournament in a row.)
Most consecutive singles titles	Women	(Netherlands) Esther Vergeer (Netherlands) Diede de Groot	6	2005–2007, 2009–2011 (Note: This tournament was not held in 2008 and 2012 due to a clash with the Paralympics. This means that the most years in a row Vergeer has won it is 3 but has won 6 editions of this tournament in a row.); 2018–2023
Most consecutive singles titles	Quads	(United Kingdom) Peter Norfolk (United States) David Wagner	2	2007, 2009 (Note: This tournament was not held in 2008 due to a clash with the Paralympics. This meant that Norfolk has won 2 editions of this tournament in a row.); 2010, 2011
Most doubles titles	Men	(United Kingdom) Gordon Reid	7	2015, 2017–2021, 2026
Most doubles titles	Women	(Netherlands) Esther Vergeer	6	2005–2007, 2009–2011
Most doubles titles	Quads	(United States) David Wagner	9	2007, 2009–2011, 2013–2015, 2017, 2018
Most consecutive doubles titles	Men	(United Kingdom) Gordon Reid	6	2015, 2017–2021 (Note: This tournament was not held in 2016 due to a clash with the Paralympics. This meant that Reid has won 6 editions of this tournament in a row.)
Most consecutive doubles titles	Women	(Netherlands) Esther Vergeer	6	2005–2007, 2009–2011
Most consecutive doubles titles	Quads	(United States) David Wagner	9	2007, 2009–2011, 2013–2015, 2017, 2018 (Note: This tournament was not held in 2008, 2012 and 2016 due to a clash with the Paralympics. This means that the most years in a row Wagner has won it is 3 but has won 9 editions of this tournament in a row.)
Miscellaneous
		Mal Anderson	1957	
		Fred Stolle	1966	
Unseeded champions	Men	(United States) Andre Agassi	1994	
Unseeded champions	Women	(Belgium) Kim Clijsters (United States) Sloane Stephens (United Kingdom) Emma Raducanu	2009; 2017 (the only Protected ranking to win a major title); 2021 (the only qualifier to win a major title)	
Youngest singles champion	Men	(United States) Pete Sampras	19 years and 1 month (1990)	
Youngest singles champion	Women	(United States) Tracy Austin	16 years and 8 months (1979)	
Oldest singles champion	Men	(United States) William Larned	38 years and 8 months (1911)	
Oldest singles champion	Women	(Norway) / (United States) Molla Mallory	42 years and 5 months (1926)	

== Media and attendance ==
=== Media coverage ===
The US Open's website allows viewing of live streaming video, but unlike other Grand Slam tournaments, does not allow watching video on demand. The site also offers live radio coverage.

==== United States ====
Since 2015, ESPN has served as the exclusive broadcaster of the US Open in the United States, initially under an eleven-year deal; the contract ended 47 years of coverage produced and aired by CBS.

In 2024, ESPN reached a $2.04 billion extension of its contract from 2026 to 2037, granting the network additional digital rights to the tournament, and rights to air a whiparound show during the early rounds. Under the new contract, ESPN also transitioned away from serving as global host broadcaster of the US Open, with the USTA itself now controlling production via partnerships with HBS and NEP Group.

==== Other regions ====
- Continental Europe – Eurosport
- Latin America & Caribbean – ESPN International
- Middle East & North Africa – beIN Sports
- Southern Africa – SuperSport
- Indian Subcontinent – Star Sports
- Southeast Asia – SPOTV
- Oceania – ESPN International

Exceptions

- UK and Ireland – Prime Video (2022), Sky Sports (from 2023)
- Australia – Nine Network and Stan Sport
- Canada – TSN and RDS (ABC is available in selected areas closer to the border)
- China – CCTV and iQIYI
- Japan – Wowow
- Pakistan – PTV Sports
- South Korea – JTBC

=== Recent attendance ===
Season	Total	Ref.
2005	659,538	
2006	640,000	
2007	715,587	
2008	720,227	
2009	721,059	
2010	712,976	
2011	658,664	
2012	710,803	
2013	713,026	
2014	713,642	
2015	691,280	
2016	688,542	
2017	691,143	
2018	732,663	
2019	737,872	
2020	0	(Note: The 2020 US Open was played without an audience due to the COVID-19 pandemic in New York.)
2021	631,134	
2022	776,120	
2023	957,387	
2024	1,048,669	
2025	1,144,562	
2026	TBD	

Sources: US Open, City University of New York (CUNY)

== See also ==
- List of US Open men's singles champions
- List of US Open women's singles champions
- List of US Open men's doubles champions
- List of US Open women's doubles champions
- List of US Open singles finalists during the Open Era

== Notes ==
Preceded by Wimbledon	Grand Slam Tournament; August–September	Succeeded by Australian Open
